= 1991 Portuguese presidential election =

- 13 January 1991
- Turnout: 62.16% (▼13.23pp)
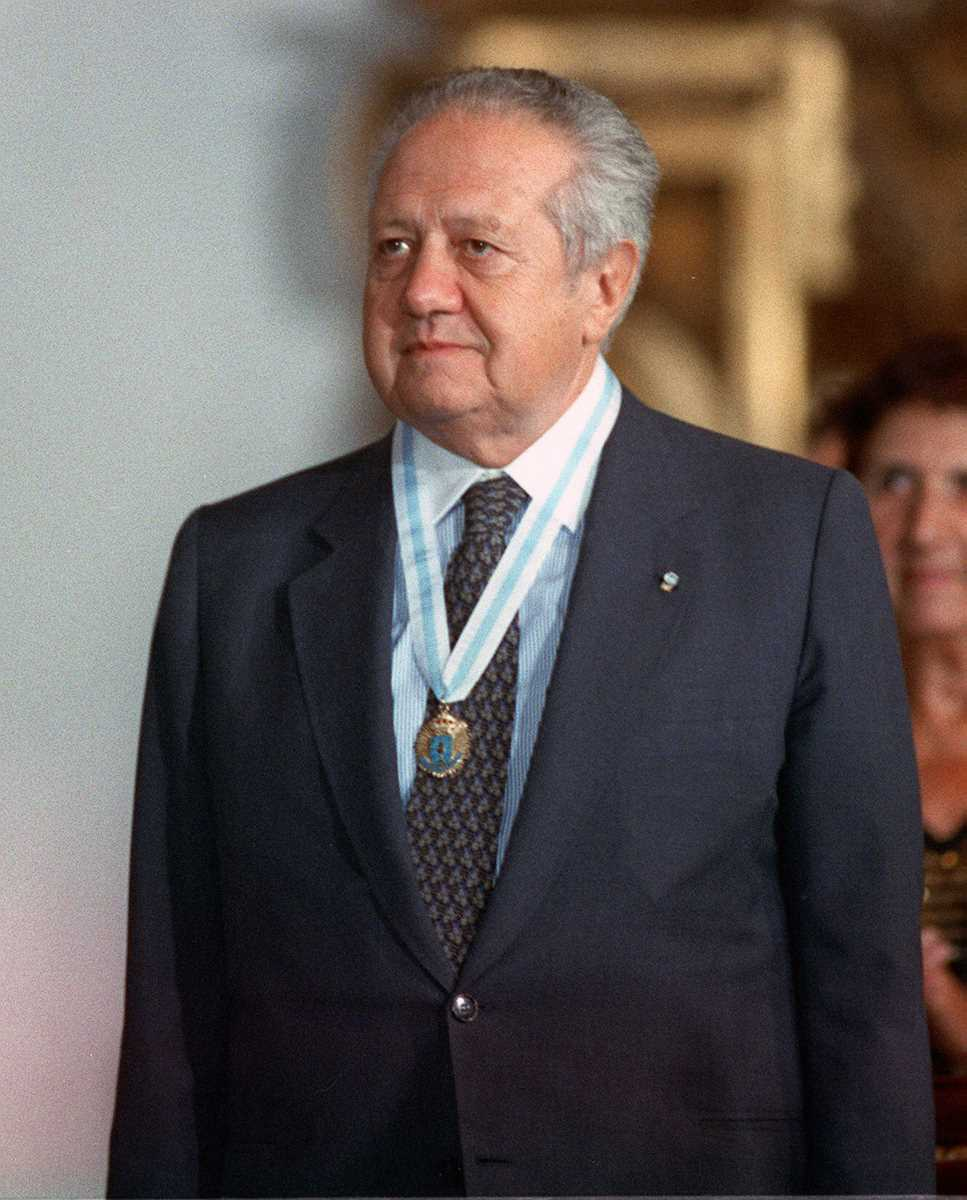

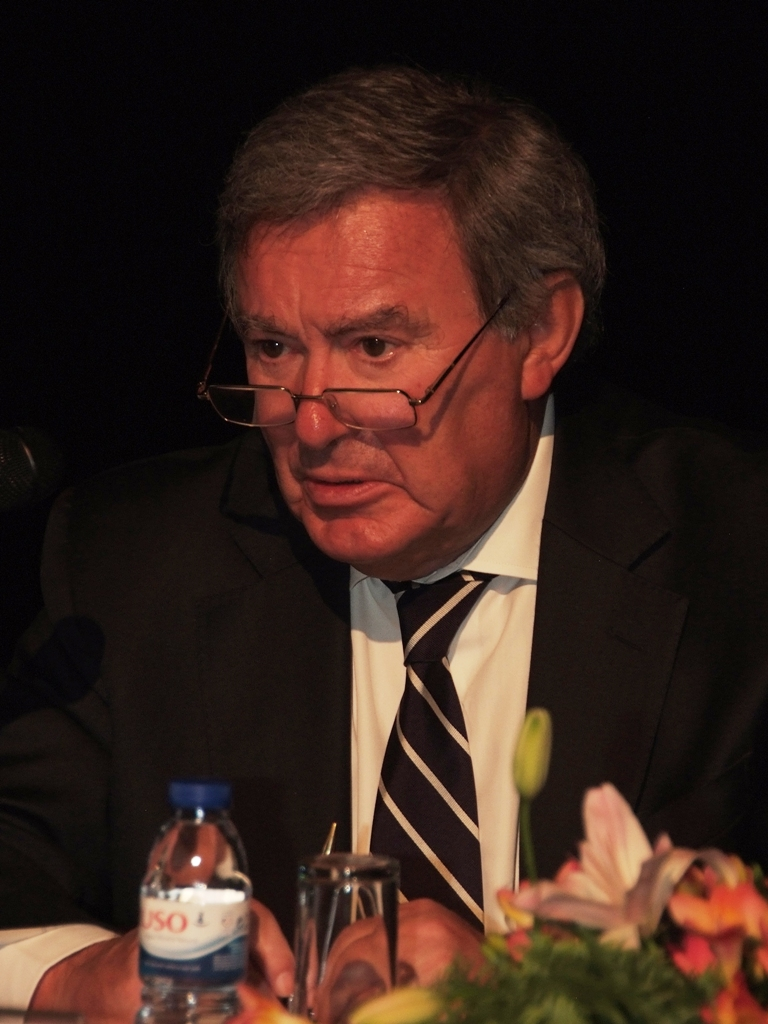

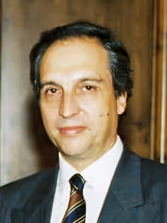
Candidate	Mário Soares	Basílio Horta	Carlos Carvalhas
Party	PS Supported by: PSD	CDS Supported by: PPM	PCP Supported by: PEV
Popular vote	3,459,521	696,379	635,373
Percentage	70.35%	14.16%	12.92%

Soares
40-50%
50-60%
60-70%
70-80%
80-90%
Carvalhas
40-50%
50-60%
President before election
Mário Soares
PS
Elected President
Mário Soares
PS

A presidential election was held in Portugal on 13 January 1991.

Incumbent president Mário Soares was eliglbe to run for a second consecutive term, and was a candidate for re-election. Soares was easily re-elected as head of state, achieving more than 70% of the votes, the highest percentage of votes ever recorded for a presidential candidate in Portuguese democracy. Mário Soares gained a majority of the votes in every district of the country, and in 295 out of the then 305 municipalities.

As the election of a center-left candidate was assured, other left-wing parties, the Portuguese Communist Party and the People's Democratic Union, presented their own candidates. The communists presented Carlos Carvalhas, who had been Assistant General Secretary of the Party a year before (Álvaro Cunhal was the secretary-general), which polled third with 13% of the votes. Carvalhas would later be elected secretary-general of the party in 1992. Mário Soares achieved the majority of the votes in every district of the country, and 295 of the then 305 municipalities. On the right, the Social Democratic Party supported Soares, while the Democratic and Social Centre supported the candidacy of Basílio Horta, who finished second with 14% of the votes. Voter turnout had a significant drop compared with the previous election, with 62% of voters casting a ballot. Soares was sworn in for a second term as President on 9 March 1991.

== Background ==
Mário Soares was elected president, on the second round in February 1986, with 51% of the votes. Soares' first term was marked by the calm cohabitation with PSD prime minister Aníbal Cavaco Silva, with Soares rejecting an alternative PS-PCP-PRD government after the approval of a motion of no confidence against Cavaco's minority government in April 1987, and calling an election that would result in a landslide absolute majority for the PSD. Major economic and constitutional reforms, along with modernization driven by the arrival of European funds, and strong economic growth, also characterized Soares' first term as head of state.

=== Pre-campaign ===
In the follow-up for the presidential election, divisions on the right-wing emerged, mainly in the Democratic and Social Center (CDS), regarding a candidate to face Soares. Former party leader Francisco Lucas Pires considered a run, but withdrew during the summer of 1990 due to lack of support and Soares' strong popularity, while others, namely party leader and 1986 candidate, Diogo Freitas do Amaral, rejected a "rematch" against Soares. In the end, the party gave its support to the candidacy of Basílio Horta. On the Social Democrats (PSD), the issue of the presidential elections was not seen as very important, despite Madeiran president Alberto João Jardim proposing that the party abstained from supporting any candidate, being quite critical of Soares and with some even considering his name as a possible candidate. Former president António Ramalho Eanes, another strong critic of president Soares, also rejected any idea of running again for office, especially after leading his party, the Democratic Renewal Party (PRD), to a massive defeat in the 1987 legislative election.

== Electoral system ==
Any Portuguese citizen over 35 years old has the opportunity to run for president. In order to do so it is necessary to gather between 7,500 and 15,000 signatures and submit them to the Portuguese Constitutional Court.

According to the Portuguese Constitution, to be elected, a candidate needs a majority of votes. If no candidate gets this majority there will take place a second round between the two most voted candidates.

== Candidates ==
=== Official candidates ===
Candidate	Party support	Political office(s)	Details
Mário Soares (66)	Socialist Party Social Democratic Party	President of the Republic (1986–1996); Prime Minister (1976–1978; 1983–1985); Secretary-general of the Socialist Party (1973–1985); Minister without portfolio (1975); Minister of Foreign Affairs (1974–1975); Member of the Assembly of the Republic (1975–1986)	Incumbent President, after winning the 1986 presidential election in the second round with 51.2% of the votes; eligible for a second term.
Basílio Horta (47)	Democratic and Social Center People's Monarchist Party	Member of the Assembly of the Republic (1976–1991); Minister of Agriculture (1981–1983); Minister in the Cabinet of the Prime Minister (1981); Minister of Commerce and Tourism (1978; 1980–1981)	Democratic and Social Center (CDS) member; CDS Secretary-general.
Carlos Carvalhas (49)	Portuguese Communist Party Ecologist Party "The Greens"	Deputy Secretary-general of the Portuguese Communist Party (1990–1992); Member of the Assembly of the Republic (1976–1980; 1983–2005); Member of the European Parliament (1989–1990); Secretary of State for Labour (1974–1975)	Portuguese Communist Party (PCP) member; syndicalist.
Carlos Manuel Marques (42)	Popular Democratic Union	None	Popular Democratic Union (UDP) founding member; engineer.

=== Decided not to run ===
- Adriano Moreira – former President of the Democratic and Social Centre (1986–1988);
- Alberto João Jardim – incumbent President of the Regional Government of Madeira (1976–2015);
- António Ramalho Eanes – former President of the Republic (1976–1986); former President of the Democratic Renewal Party (1986–1988);
- Diogo Freitas do Amaral – incumbent President of the Democratic and Social Centre (1988–1992; 1974–1983); candidate in the previous presidential election;
- Francisco Lucas Pires – former President of the Democratic and Social Centre (1983–1986);
- Hermínio Martinho – former President of the Democratic Renewal Party (1985–1986; 1988–1990);
- Nuno Krus Abecasis – former Mayor of Lisbon (1979–1989).

== Campaign period ==
=== Issues ===
With forecasts suggesting an easy reelection for Soares, plus with Prime Minister Cavaco Silva's endorsement of the incumbent President's bid, the campaign was mostly stirred by the Macau Fax case. The case involved the then-governor of Macau, Carlos Melancia, a close friend of Mário Soares, who was accused of corruption and of receiving bribes to benefit a company in the construction of the territory's new airport, with copies of the faxes from the proceedings being leaked to the press. During a debate on RTP1, CDS candidate Basílio Horta used the case to attack Soares' integrity and accuse him of being involved, while Soares vehemently denied any involvement.

=== Party slogans ===
Candidate	Original slogan	English translation	Refs
Mário Soares	« Soares é fixe »	"Soares is cool"	
Basílio Horta	« Um Homem às direitas »	"An upright man"	
Carlos Carvalhas	« Portugal pode ser melhor »	"Portugal can be better"	
Carlos Manuel Marques	« A coragem de ser solidário »	"The courage to be supportive"	

=== Candidates' debates ===
1991 Portuguese presidential election debates
Date	Organisers	Moderator(s)	P Present A Absent invitee N Non-invitee				
Date	Organisers	Moderator(s)	Soares	Horta	Carvalhas	Marques	Refs
21 Nov 1990	RTP1	Vicente Jorge Silva; Maria Elisa Domingues	P	A	P	P	
4 Dec 1990	RTP1	-	N	N	P	P	
6 Dec 1990	RTP1	Mário Crespo	P	P	N	N	
11 Dec 1990	RTP1	-	P	N	P	N	
13 Dec 1990	RTP1	-	N	P	N	P	
19 Dec 1990	RTP1	-	P	N	N	P	
20 Dec 1990	RTP1	-	N	P	P	N	
21 Dec 1990	RTP2	Joaquim Furtado	P	P	P	P	

== Opinion polls ==
Exit poll

Polling firm	Fieldwork date	Sample size	Mário Soares	Basílio Horta	Carlos Carvalhas	Carlos Marques	Oth/ Und	Lead
Polling firm	Fieldwork date	Sample size	PS	CDS	PCP	UDP	Oth/ Und	Lead
Election results	13 Jan 1991	—N/a	70.4	14.2	12.9	2.6	—N/a	56.2
Euroexpansão	13 Jan 1991	—N/a	69.5–73.4	14.1–17.2	9.3–12.6	1.6–2.9	—N/a	55.8
Euroexpansão	5–6 Jan 1991	634	60.0	12.4	9.0	2.2	16.4	47.6

== Results ==
=== National summary ===
Candidate	Party	Votes	%
Mário Soares	Socialist Party (Note: Also supported tacitly by the Social Democratic Party.)	3,459,521	70.35
Basílio Horta	Democratic Social Center (Note: Also supported by the People's Monarchist Party.)	696,379	14.16
Carlos Carvalhas	Portuguese Communist Party (Note: Also supported by the Ecologist Party "The Greens".)	635,373	12.92
Carlos Manuel Marques	Popular Democratic Union	126,581	2.57
Total		4,917,854	100.00
Valid votes		4,917,854	96.45
Invalid votes		68,037	1.33
Blank votes		112,877	2.21
Total votes		5,098,768	100.00
Registered voters/turnout		8,202,212	62.16
Source: Comissão Nacional de Eleições

=== Results by district ===
District	Soares		Horta		Carvalhas		Marques		Turnout
District	Votes	%	Votes	%	Votes	%	Votes	%	Turnout
Aveiro	250,336	77.27%	49,675	15.33%	17,894	5.52%	6,065	1.87%	64.36%
Azores	75,530	80.66%	12,192	13.02%	3,652	3.49%	6,685	6.39%	51.79%
Beja	48,694	54.06%	5,293	5.88%	33,796	37.52%	2,294	2.55%	60.34%
Braga	287,287	77.49%	50,991	13.75%	26,230	7.08%	6,210	1.68%	66.41%
Bragança	51,571	67.48%	19,373	25.35%	3,869	5.06%	1,615	2.11%	53.18%
Castelo Branco	82,470	71.63%	18,627	16.18%	10,593	9.20%	3,443	2.99%	60.29%
Coimbra	166,041	76.86%	26,416	12.23%	19,084	8.83%	4,498	2.08%	61.08%
Évora	50,805	53.99%	7,710	8.19%	33,313	35.40%	2,281	2.42%	64.94%
Faro	123,550	72.40%	21,332	12.50%	20,481	12.00%	5,280	3.09%	60.92%
Guarda	69,632	71.33%	19,874	20.36%	5,815	5.96%	2,293	2.35%	58.23%
Leiria	150,993	72.41%	38,014	18.23%	14,969	7.18%	4,535	2.17%	60.93%
Lisbon	675,760	64.89%	156,424	15.02%	177,275	17.02%	31,860	3.06%	61.73%
Madeira	70,632	67.22%	23,981	22.91%	3,652	3.49%	6,685	6.39%	57.98%
Portalegre	48,170	64.25%	7,693	10.26%	17,271	23.03%	1,844	2.46%	66.26%
Porto	627,195	76.50%	101,665	12.40%	75,517	9.21%	15,536	1.89%	65.39%
Santarém	161,301	68.96%	30,938	13.23%	34,996	14.96%	6,662	2.85%	63.33%
Setúbal	198,977	55.83%	29,955	8.40%	113,232	31.77%	14,248	4.00%	62.93%
Viana do Castelo	92,312	75.26%	18,397	15.00%	9,263	7.55%	2,693	2.20%	59.35%
Vila Real	84,358	75.05%	20,139	17.92%	5,738	5.10%	2,174	1.93%	54.63%
Viseu	145,010	75.41%	33,945	17.65%	9,869	5.13%	3,480	1.81%	57.96%
Source: SGMAI Presidential Election Results

=== Maps ===
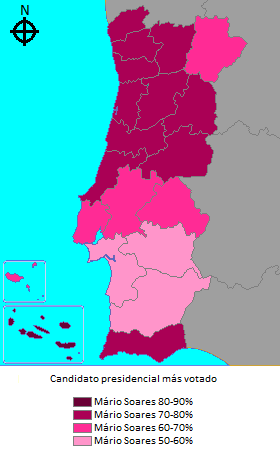
Strongest candidate by electoral district.

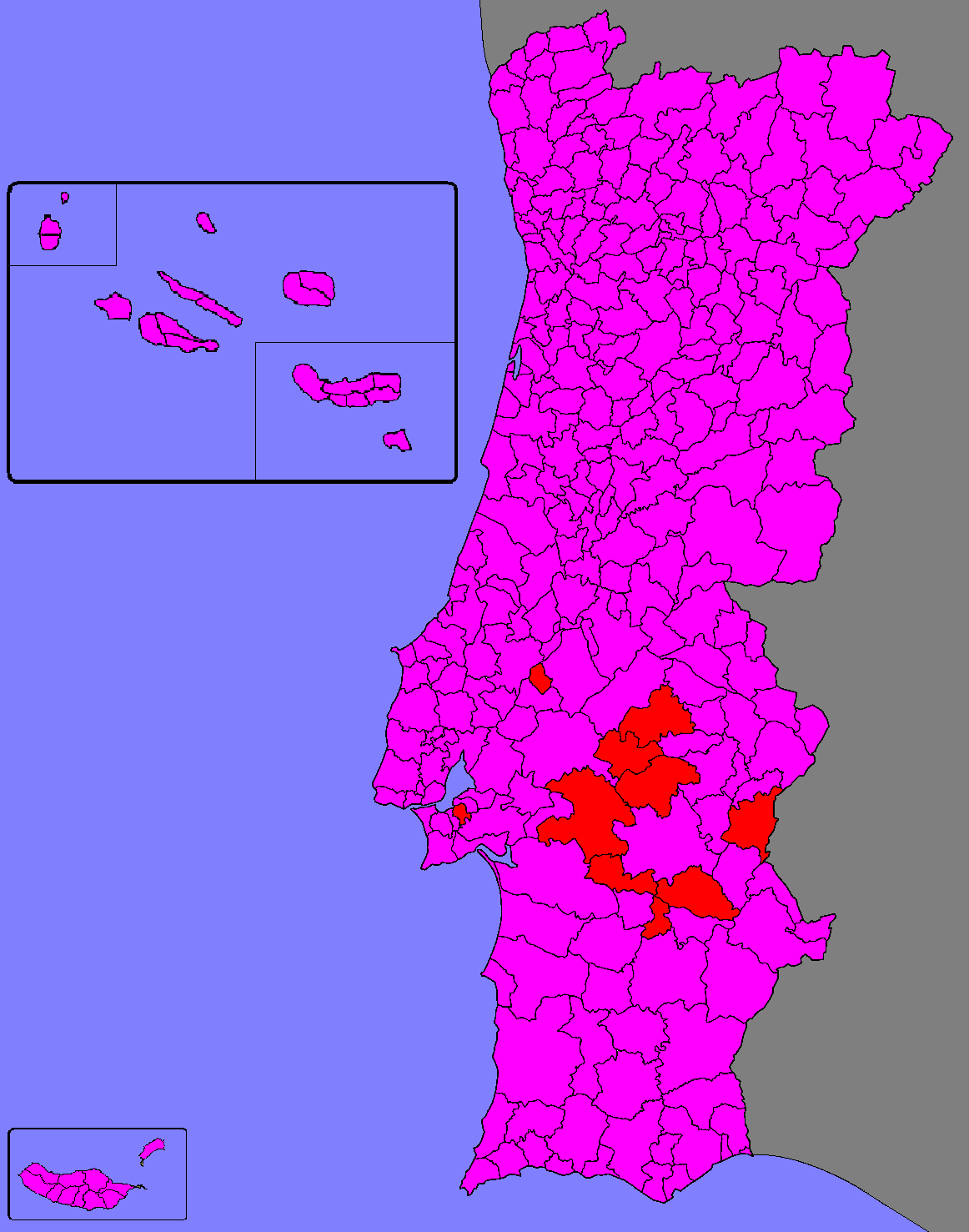
Strongest candidate by municipality.
