= 1985 Portuguese legislative election =

- 6 October 1985

All 250 seats in the Assembly of the Republic 126 seats needed for a majority
- Registered: 7,818,981 ▲6.6%
- Turnout: 5,798,929 (74.2%) ▼3.6 pp
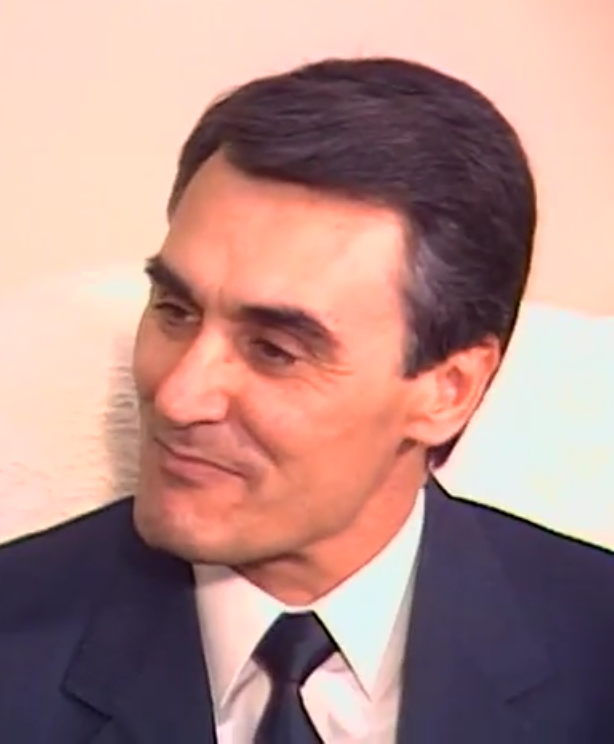

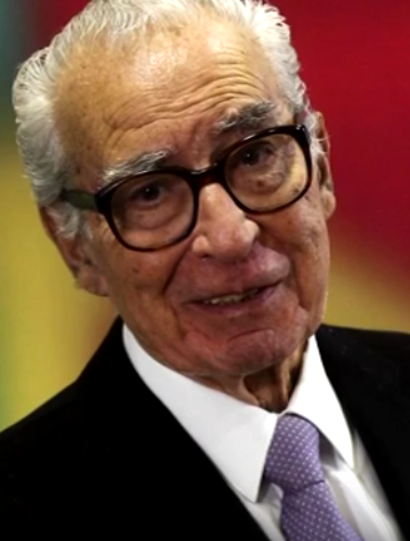

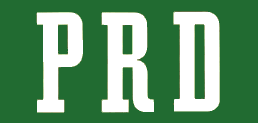

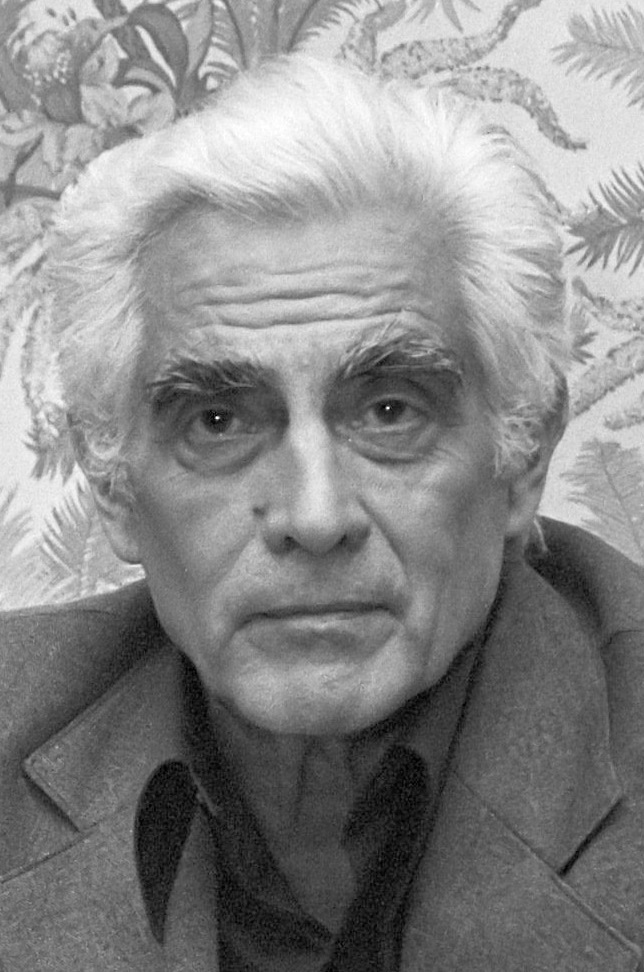

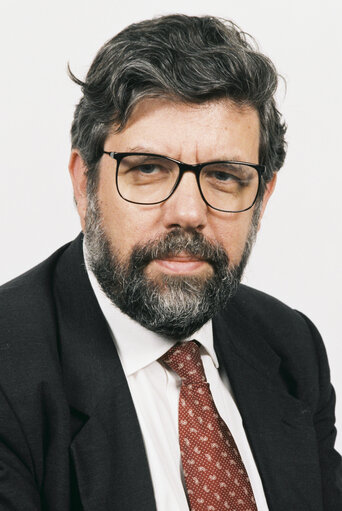
	First party	Second party	Third party
Leader	Aníbal Cavaco Silva	Almeida Santos	Hermínio Martinho
Party	PSD	PS	PRD
Leader since	2 June 1985	13 July 1985 (designated candidate)	10 July 1985
Leader's seat	Lisbon	Porto	Santarém
Last election	75 seats, 27.2%	101 seats, 36.1%	Did not contest
Seats won	88	57	45
Seat change	▲13	▼44	▲45
Popular vote	1,732,288	1,204,321	1,038,893
Percentage	29.9%	20.8%	17.9%
Swing	▲2.7 pp	▼15.3 pp	New party
	Fourth party	Fifth party
Leader	Álvaro Cunhal	Francisco Lucas Pires
Party	PCP	CDS
Alliance	APU
Leader since	14 April 1978	20 February 1983
Leader's seat	Lisbon	Lisbon
Last election	44 seats, 18.1%	30 seats, 12.6%
Seats won	38	22
Seat change	▼6	▼8
Popular vote	898,281	577,580
Percentage	15.5%	10.0%
Swing	▼2.6 pp	▼2.6 pp
Prime Minister before election
Mário Soares
PS
Prime Minister after election
Aníbal Cavaco Silva
PSD

The 1985 Portuguese legislative election took place on 6 October. The election renewed all 250 members of the Assembly of the Republic.

The election was called after the resignation, in June 1985, of Socialist Party (PS) Prime Minister Mário Soares, following the withdrawal of the center-right Social Democratic Party (PSD) from the Central Bloc government. Soares didn't contest the election, deciding to run for the January 1986 Presidential elections instead.

On election day, the Social Democrats came in first place with nearly 30% of the votes and Cavaco became Prime Minister, while the Socialists achieved their worst result ever, less than 21% of the votes and 57 seats. The election was the first of three consecutive election victories for the Social Democratic Party. The Communists also lost votes and MPs, and the left would only return to the government ten years later, in 1995. CDS as well had a drop in support, following their rejection of a PSD/CDS joint list for the election.

The election results were also prominent because a new party had been formed by supporters of the then-incumbent President Ramalho Eanes, the Democratic Renewal Party (PRD). The party's results were a surprise, gaining more than one million votes and electing 45 MPs, becoming the parliamentary support of Cavaco's government until 1987, when it withdrew its support, causing the government to fall. Compared with the previous election, voter turnout fell, with just over 74% of voters casting a ballot.

== Background ==
Following the 1983 election, the Socialist Party (PS) and the Social Democratic Party (PSD) formed a coalition, the Central Bloc government, which implemented a severe bailout package to rescue the country's economy and public finances.

=== Government fall ===
Two years after being formed, the Central Bloc government (PS+PSD) became very unpopular, with deep divisions forming both between the two coalition parties and within them, as growing poverty, budget cuts and unemployment, due to the International Monetary Fund bailout policies, were leading to massive protests. After February 1985, internal problems within the PSD, coupled with unexpected events, led to a leadership dispute that culminated in the election of a new leader, resulting in the party's withdrawal from the government and Soares' resignation as prime minister. President Eanes dissolved the Assembly and called a new election for 6 October.

=== Leadership changes and challenges ===
==== Social Democratic Party ====
By 1985, deep divisions were consuming the PSD regarding their role in the Central Bloc government with the PS and the party's strategy for the 1986 presidential election. Then deputy prime minister and PSD leader Carlos Mota Pinto, resigned from both the government and the party's leadership, and a snap party congress was called. But, Mota Pinto, who was expected to run for the leadership in the snap congress, died suddenly just 10 days before the start of the congress in Figueira da Foz. João Salgueiro, the candidate from "Mota Pinto's wing" was expected to win easily, but former finance minister Aníbal Cavaco Silva surprised the party by announcing a late candidacy, in what is now known as the "testing of Cavaco's new Citroën". Cavaco Silva had the support of the wings against the Central Bloc, also proposing the party's support for Diogo Freitas do Amaral in the 1986 presidential election, and against all odds he defeated Salgueiro by 57 votes. The results were the following:

Ballot: 19 May 1985
Candidate	Votes	%
Aníbal Cavaco Silva	422	53.6
João Salgueiro	365	46.4
Turnout	787	
Source: Results

==== Socialist Party ====
After the fall of the Central Bloc government, Mário Soares was acclaimed as the PS candidate for the 1986 Presidential election, and shortly thereafter, António Almeida Santos was selected as the party's candidate for Prime Minister in the 1985 legislative election, defeating a last minute candidacy from Jaime Gama.

Ballot: 13 July 1985
Candidate	Votes	%
António Almeida Santos	30	61.2
Jaime Gama	14	28.6
Abstention	5	10.2
Turnout	49	100.0

== Electoral system ==
The Assembly of the Republic has 250 members elected to four-year terms. Governments do not require absolute majority support of the Assembly to hold office, as even if the number of opposers of government is larger than that of the supporters, the number of opposers still needs to be equal or greater than 126 (absolute majority) for both the Government's Programme to be rejected or for a motion of no confidence to be approved.

The number of seats assigned to each district depends on the district magnitude. The use of the d'Hondt method makes for a higher effective threshold than certain other allocation methods such as the Hare quota or Sainte-Laguë method, which are more generous to small parties.

For these elections, and compared with the 1983 elections, the MPs distributed by districts were the following:

District	Number of MPs	Map
Lisbon	56	
Porto^{(+1)}	39	
Setúbal	17	
Braga	16	
Aveiro	15	
Santarém	12	
Leiria and Coimbra	11	
Viseu	10	
Faro	9	
Castelo Branco, Viana do Castelo and Vila Real	6	
Azores, Beja, Évora, Guarda and Madeira	5	
Bragança	4	
Portalegre^{(–1)}	3	
Europe and Outside Europe	2	

== Parties ==
Before the election, the Social Democratic Party (PSD) and the Democratic and Social Centre (CDS) considered running in a joint coalition for the elections, with the PSD "offering" 25 safe seats to CDS on the lists, but this proposal was rejected by CDS and the two parties decided to contest the election separately. The table below lists the parties represented in the Assembly of the Republic during the 3rd legislature (1983–1985) and that also partook in the election:

Name		Ideology	Political position	Leader	1983 result	
Name		Ideology	Political position	Leader	%	Seats
PS	Socialist Party; Partido Socialista	Social democracy	Centre-left	Almeida Santos	36.1%	94 / 250
UEDS	Left-wing Union for the Socialist Democracy; União da Esquerda para a Democracia Socialista	Democratic Socialism; Workers' self-management	Left-wing	António Lopes Cardoso	36.1%	4 / 250
ASDI	Independent Social-Democratic Action; Acção Social Democrata Independente	Democratic Socialism; Social democracy	Centre-left	António de Sousa Franco	36.1%	3 / 250
PPD/PSD	Social Democratic Party; Partido Social Democrata	Liberal conservatism	Centre-right	Aníbal Cavaco Silva	27.2%	75 / 250
PCP	Portuguese Communist Party; Partido Comunista Português	Communism; Marxism–Leninism	Far-left	Álvaro Cunhal	18.1% (Note: The Portuguese Communist Party (PCP) and the Portuguese Democratic Movement (MDP/CDE) contested the 1983 election in a coalition called United People Alliance (APU) and won a combined 18.1% of the vote and elected 44 MPs to parliament.)	41 / 250
MDP/CDE	Portuguese Democratic Movement; Movimento Democrático Português	Left-wing nationalism Democratic socialism	Left-wing	José Manuel Tengarrinha	18.1%	3 / 250
CDS	Democratic and Social Centre; Centro Democrático e Social	Christian democracy	Centre-right to right-wing	Francisco Lucas Pires	12.6%	30 / 250

== Campaign period ==
=== Issues ===
Following two years of strong austerity and political instability, voter apathy was a concern during the campaign. The Socialist Party (PS), under a new leader, Almeida Santos, blamed the instability on the PSD and sought a majority of its own, with banners asking voters "43% for the PS", but the party was damaged by high unemployment and the IMF bailout measures. On the other hand, the Social Democratic Party (PSD), also under a new leader, Aníbal Cavaco Silva, personalized its campaign around the leader, portraying Cavaco as a strong and stable figure. The campaign was also marked by the "eruption" of the Democratic Renewal Party (PRD), which ran under a populist message, aligned with the popular incumbent President António Ramalho Eanes, and although it was officially led by Hermínio Martinho, the main figure of the party's campaign was first lady Manuela Ramalho Eanes, who campaigned on behalf of her husband.

=== Party slogans ===
Party or alliance	Original slogan	English translation	Refs
PS	« O que prometo, faço. Vamos a isto. »	"What I promise, I do. Let's do this."	
PSD	« Retomar a esperança »	"Resuming hope"	
APU	« Vitória da APU para salvar o país »	"Victory for APU to save the country"	
CDS	« Confiança, razão, força para Portugal »	"Trust, reason, strength for Portugal"	
PRD	« Mais Portugal »	"More Portugal"	

=== Candidates' debates ===
1985 Portuguese legislative election debates
Date	Organisers	Moderator(s)	P Present A Absent invitee N Non-invitee				
Date	Organisers	Moderator(s)	PS Santos	PSD Cavaco	APU Cunhal	CDS Pires	Refs
3 Sep	RTP1	Mário Crespo	P	A (Note: Aníbal Cavaco Silva, PSD leader, refused to participate in the debate.)	P	P	
5 Sep	RTP1	Mário Crespo	N	A (Note: Aníbal Cavaco Silva, PSD leader, refused to participate in the debate, being replaced by Eurico de Melo, however, the latter was forbidden from participating.Fundação Mário Soares 1985)	P	P	
10 Sep	RTP1	Mário Crespo	P	P	N	P	
12 Sep	RTP1	Mário Crespo	P	P	P	N	
Candidate viewed as "most convincing" in each debate
Date	Organisers	Polling firm/Link					
Date	Organisers	Polling firm/Link	PS	PSD	APU	CDS	Notes
3 Sep	RTP1	Expresso	36	—N/a	23	25	16% Neither

== Opinion polling ==
The following table shows the opinion polls of voting intention of the Portuguese voters before the election. Included is also the result of the Portuguese general elections in 1983 and 1985 for reference.

Exit poll / Forecast

Polling firm/Link	Date Released	PS	PSD	APU	CDS	PRD	O	Lead
1985 legislative election	6 Oct 1985	20.8; 57	29.9; 88	15.5; 38	10.0; 22	17.9; 45	5.9; 0	9.1
RTP1	6 Oct 1985 (22:50)	22.0– 26.9	26.8– 29.7	15.0– 18.1	9.3– 10.8	14.5– 16.5	–	2.8; 4.8
RTP1	6 Oct 1985 (21:10)	23.8– 26.9	28.0– 29.8	17.3– 18.1	9.8– 10.7	11.1– 14.9	–	2.9; 6.0
Rádio Comercial	6 Oct 1985	19– 22	29– 31	14– 16	8–16	18– 22	–	9–10
Expresso	4 Oct 1985	28– 32	27– 31	15– 17	9–12	8–11	–	1
Norma	29 Apr 1985	24.7	16.4	18.4	17.1	8.4	15.0	6.3
Norma	Mar 1985	21.1	18.4	20.0	19.2	5.5	15.8	1.1
Marktest	Feb 1985	15.0	21.3	15.0	17.1	28.6	3.0	7.3
Norma	25 Feb 1985	20.7	21.6	17.8	17.6	10.0	12.3	0.9
Norma	21 Jan 1985	21.3	22.9	20.3	16.2	—N/a	19.3	1.6
Marktest	Dec 1984	18.6	23.0	14.3	16.2	25.4	2.5	2.4
Norma	Dec 1984	23.5	25.2	23.4	13.2	—N/a	14.7	1.7
Marktest	Nov 1984	19.8	24.0	15.5	14.9	23.3	2.5	0.7
Norma	Nov 1984	20.7	22.7	22.4	17.5	—N/a	16.7	0.3
Marktest	Oct 1984	20.6	23.4	15.8	13.4	25.0	1.8	4.0
Norma	15 Oct 1984	23.9	24.8	23.1	14.7	—N/a	13.5	0.9
Marktest	Sep 1984	18.8	22.6	15.2	15.7	26.6	1.1	4.0
Marktest	Aug 1984	19.2	22.8	13.8	15.6	26.9	1.7	4.1
Marktest	Jul 1984	17.9	20.6	16.9	13.4	29.0	2.2	7.7
Norma	Jul 1984	21.5	23.6	20.3	15.4	—N/a	19.2	2.1
Marktest	Jun 1984	19.8	16.7	16.6	16.9	27.5	2.5	7.7
Norma	Jun 1984	24.2	21.5	22.1	17.0	—N/a	15.2	2.1
Marktest	May 1984	25.4	19.8	13.9	14.6	24.6	1.7	0.8
Marktest	Apr 1984	28.7	19.5	15.2	10.8	17.7	8.1	9.2
Norma	Apr 1984	21.9	26.0	21.4	15.7	—N/a	15.0	4.1
Marktest	Mar 1984	22.6	16.6	14.1	12.7	15.0	19.0	6.0
Marktest	Feb 1984	18.3	15.9	12.4	10.3	20.8	22.3	2.5
Marktest	Jan 1984	19.9	15.4	12.5	7.3	22.7	22.2	2.8
Norma	Jan 1984	31.8	22.8	21.2	13.3	—N/a	10.9	9.0
1983 legislative election	25 Apr 1983	36.1; 101	27.2; 75	18.1; 44	12.6; 30	—N/a	6.0; 0	8.9

== Results ==
=== National summary ===
Party	Votes	%	+/–	Seats	+/–
Social Democratic Party	1,732,288	29.87	+2.63	88	+13
Socialist Party	1,204,321	20.77	–15.34	57	–44
Democratic Renewal Party	1,038,893	17.92	New	45	New
United People Alliance (Note: Portuguese Communist Party (35 MPs) and Portuguese Democratic Movement (3 MPs) ran in coalition.)	898,281	15.49	–2.58	38	–6
Democratic and Social Centre	577,580	9.96	–2.60	22	–8
Popular Democratic Union	73,401	1.27	+0.79	0	0
Christian Democratic Party	41,831	0.72	+0.03	0	0
Revolutionary Socialist Party	35,238	0.61	+0.38	0	0
Portuguese Workers' Communist Party	19,943	0.34	–0.03	0	0
Workers' Party of Socialist Unity	19,085	0.33	–0.01	0	0
Communist Party (Reconstructed)	12,749	0.22	+0.22	0	0
Total	5,653,610	100.00	–	250	0
Valid votes	5,653,610	97.49	+0.06		
Invalid votes	96,610	1.67	–0.16		
Blank votes	48,709	0.84	+0.10		
Total votes	5,798,929	100.00	–		
Registered voters/turnout	7,818,981	74.16	–3.63		
Source: Comissão Nacional de Eleições

Vote share
PSD	29.87%
PS	20.77%
PRD	17.92%
APU	15.49%
CDS	9.96%
UDP	1.27%
PDC	0.72%
PSR	0.61%
Others	0.89%
Blank/Invalid	2.51%

Parliamentary seats
PSD	35.20%
PS	22.80%
PRD	18.00%
APU	15.20%
CDS	8.80%

=== Distribution by constituency ===
Results of the 1985 election of the Portuguese Assembly of the Republic by constituency
Constituency	%	S	%	S	%	S	%	S	%	S	Total S
Constituency	PSD		PS		PRD		APU		CDS		Total S
Azores	48.3	3	20.1	1	15.2	1	4.4	-	6.5	-	5
Aveiro	38.4	6	23.0	4	13.4	2	6.5	1	13.5	2	15
Beja	13.7	1	20.1	1	11.6	-	44.9	3	2.2	-	5
Braga	32.8	6	21.8	4	16.8	3	8.5	1	14.0	2	16
Bragança	39.2	2	22.7	1	6.9	-	5.3	-	17.1	1	4
Castelo Branco	31.2	3	18.5	1	24.4	2	8.9	-	9.6	-	6
Coimbra	29.5	4	28.5	3	16.9	2	10.1	1	8.6	1	11
Évora	19.1	1	14.3	1	15.8	1	41.2	2	3.3	-	5
Faro	28.4	3	22.3	2	20.5	2	15.4	2	6.1	-	9
Guarda	33.6	2	23.3	2	10.9	-	5.2	-	19.5	1	5
Leiria	38.6	5	19.6	2	15.3	2	7.9	1	12.2	1	11
Lisbon	25.6	15	19.8	12	21.3	13	20.1	12	8.1	4	56
Madeira	56.8	4	13.2	1	9.7	-	3.2	-	7.8	-	5
Portalegre	20.9	1	23.7	1	18.9	-	25.2	1	4.9	-	3
Porto	29.3	12	23.6	10	20.5	8	12.1	5	9.8	4	39
Santarém	27.8	4	18.6	2	23.8	3	16.4	2	7.7	1	12
Setúbal	15.4	3	16.5	3	20.4	4	38.2	7	3.8	-	17
Viana do Castelo	33.5	3	18.4	1	16.2	1	8.2	-	16.6	1	6
Vila Real	42.2	3	23.0	2	8.6	-	5.9	-	12.5	1	6
Viseu	37.7	5	20.0	2	10.9	1	5.0	-	19.9	2	10
Europe	24.3	1	24.2	1	7.1	-	18.8	-	17.3	-	2
Outside Europe	40.5	1	7.8	-	3.3	-	2.6	-	37.9	1	2
Total	29.9	88	20.8	57	17.9	45	15.5	38	10.0	22	250
Source: Comissão Nacional de Eleições

=== Maps ===
Winner and seats by constituency.

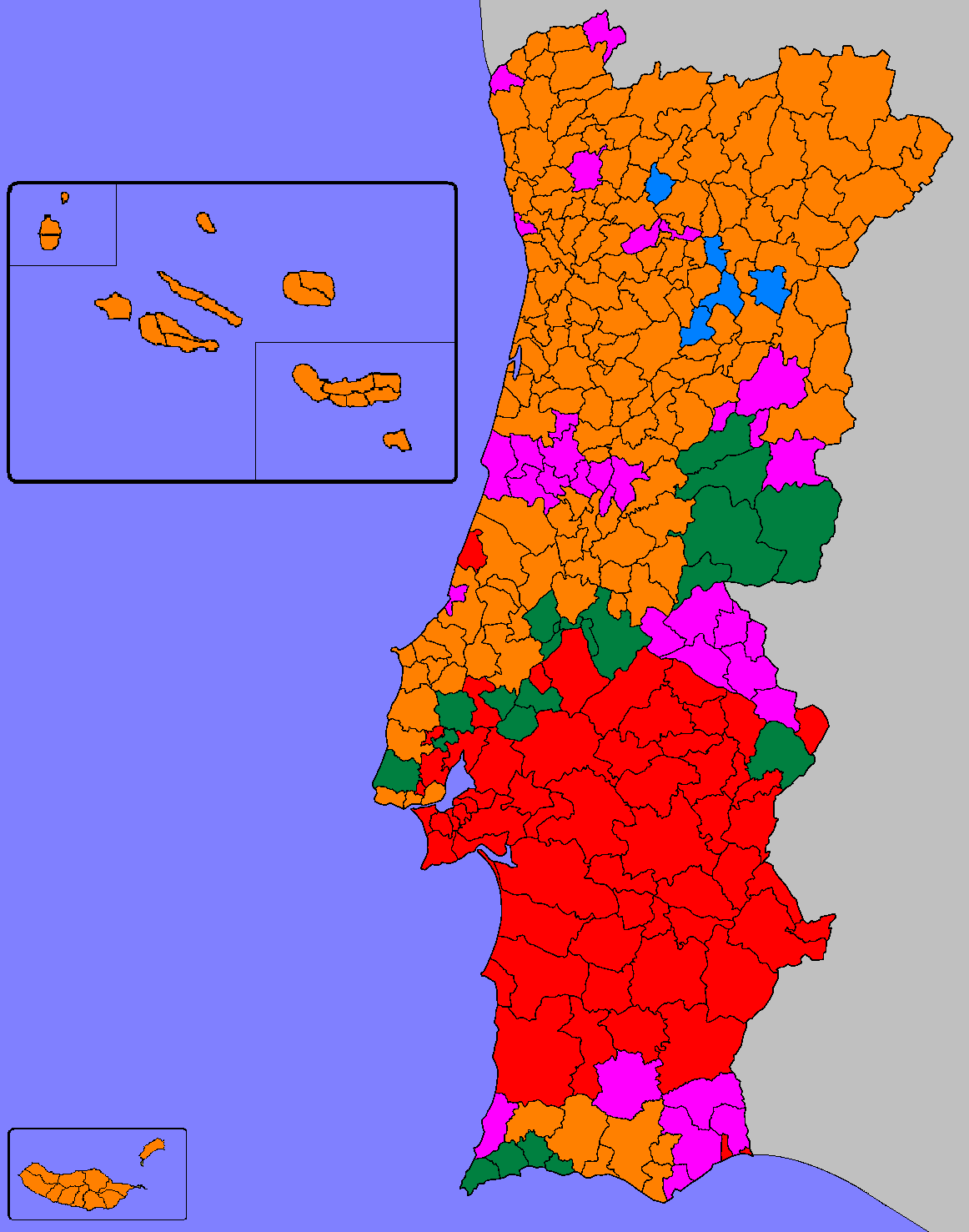
Most voted political force by municipality.

== Aftermath ==
=== Fall of the government ===
In early 1987, a trip of a Portuguese parliamentary delegation to the Soviet Union created a diplomatic issue as the delegation also traveled to Estonia, a territory that wasn't recognized by the Portuguese State as a Soviet controlled territory. Because of this incident, opposition parties accused Cavaco Silva of disallowing Parliament, and shortly afterwards, the Democratic Renewal Party (PRD) proposed a motion of no confidence against the government. At first, the Socialists (PS) weren't supportive of the PRD's motion, but last-minute negotiations led the PS to also support the motion. On 3 April 1987, the motion was approved by a 134 to 108 vote and the government fell:

Motion of no confidence Aníbal Cavaco Silva (PSD)
Ballot →	3 April 1987
Required majority →	126 out of 250
No: • PSD (86); • CDS (21); • Ind. Rui Oliveira e Costa (1)	108 / 250
Yes: • PS (55); • PRD (43); • PCP (34); • MDP/CDE (1); • Ind. Maria Santos (1)	134 / 250
Abstentions: • Ind. Gonçalo Ribeiro Telles (1)	1 / 250
Absentees: • PRD (2); • PSD (1); • PS (1); • PCP (1); • CDS (1); • MDP/CDE (1)	7 / 250
Result →	Approved

Mário Soares was on an official trip to Brazil when he was informed of the outcome of the motion, which displeased the President, returning to Lisbon to meet with the parties seated in the Assembly. The PS, PRD and PCP proposed an alternative government to the PSD minority, but Soares rejected this and called a snap general election for 19 July 1987, which resulted in a landslide PSD majority government.

== See also ==
- Politics of Portugal
- List of political parties in Portugal
- Elections in Portugal

=== Sources ===
- Fundação Mário Soares (1985). "Eurico de Melo parte loiça nos estúdios de televisão" (in Portuguese).
