= 1987 European Parliament election in Portugal =

- 19 July 1987

24 seats to the European Parliament
- Turnout: 72.4%
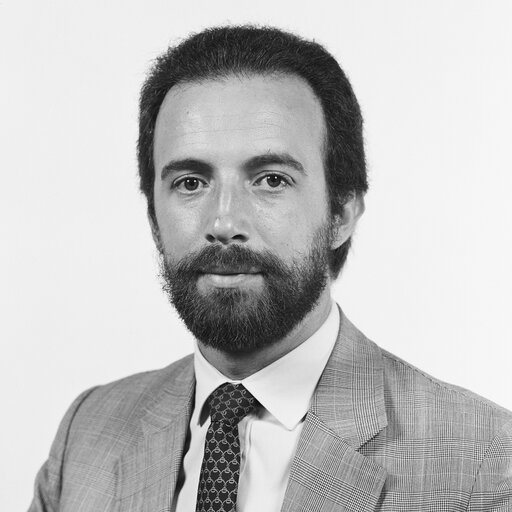

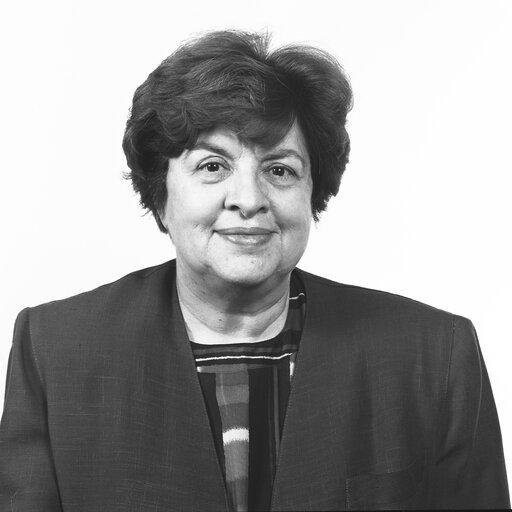

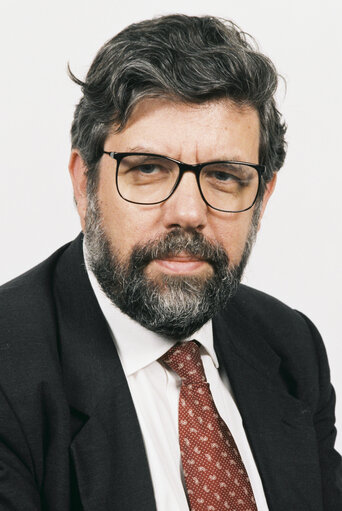

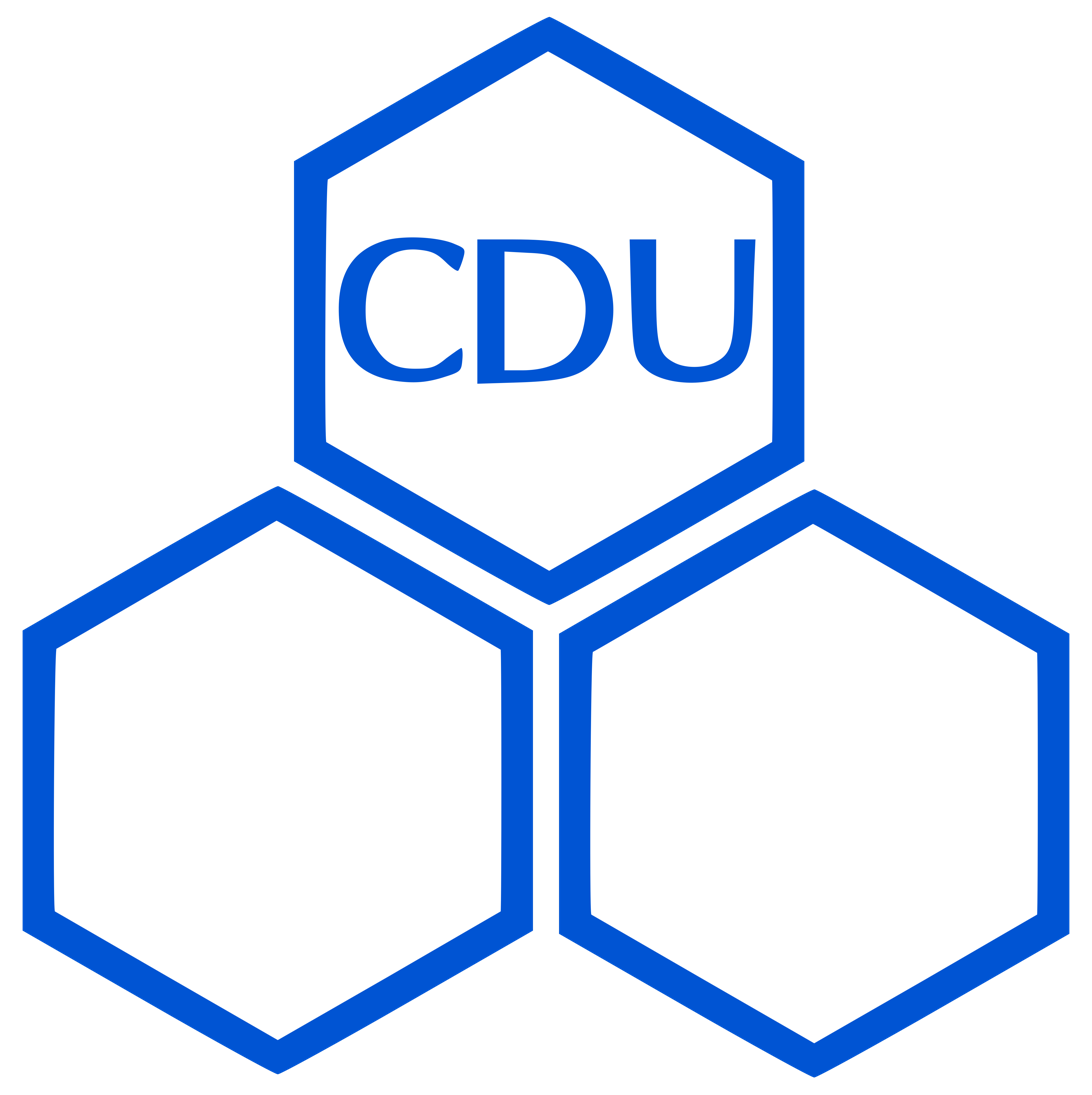

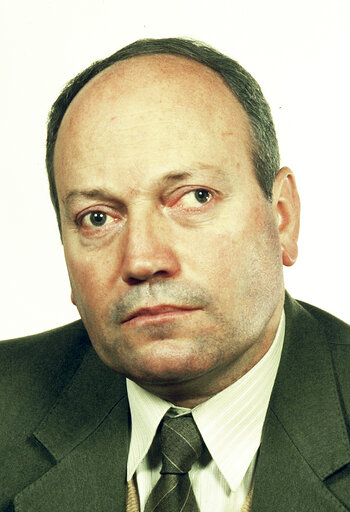

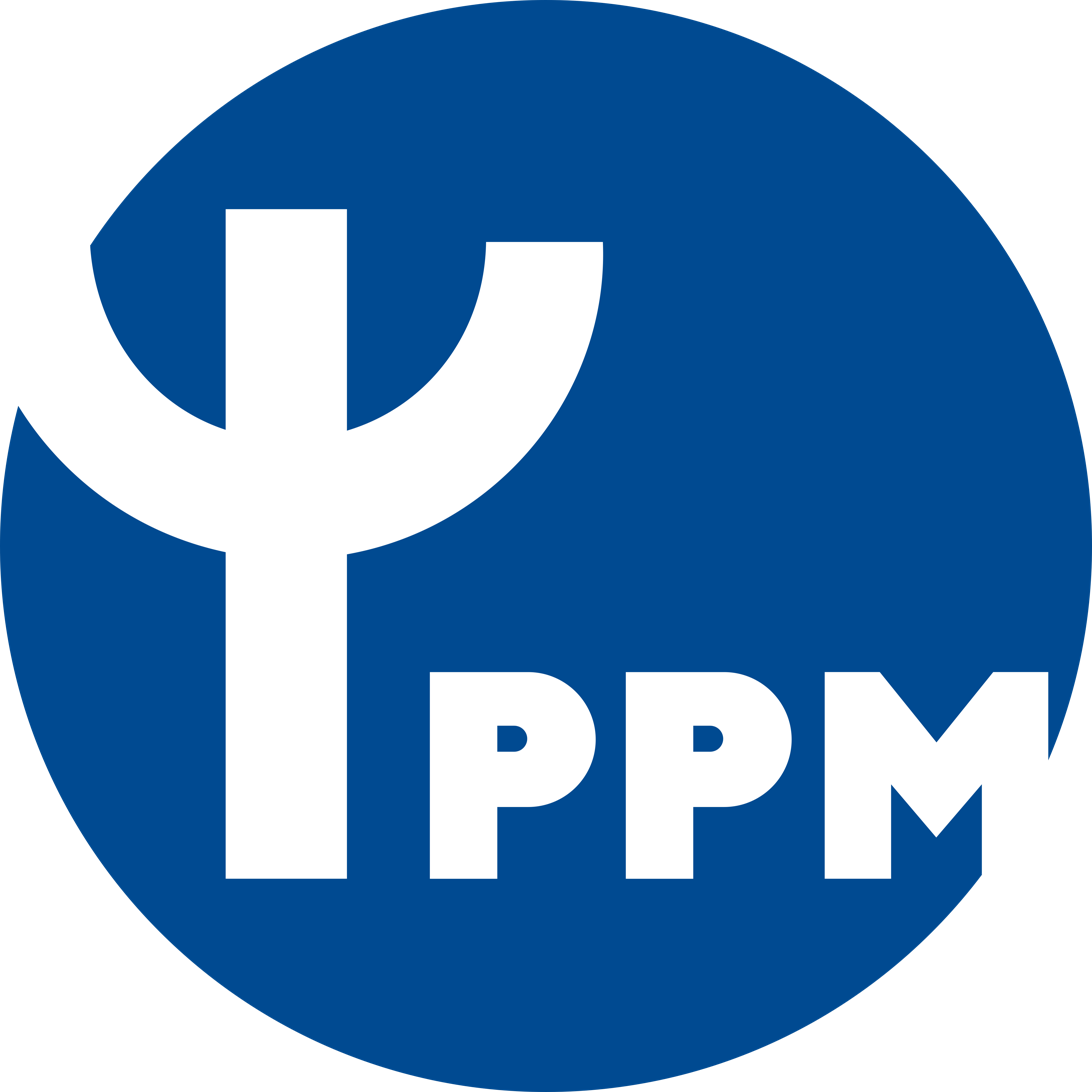
	First party	Second party	Third party
Leader	Pedro Santana Lopes	Maria de Lourdes Pintasilgo	Francisco Lucas Pires
Party	PSD	PS	CDS
Alliance	ALDE	PES	EPP
Seats won	10	6	4
Popular vote	2,111,828	1,267,672	868,718
Percentage	37.5%	22.5%	15.4%
	Fourth party	Fifth party	Sixth party
Leader	Ângelo Veloso	José Medeiros Ferreira	Miguel Esteves Cardoso
Party	CDU	PRD	PPM
Alliance	COM	EDA	None
Seats won	3	1	0
Popular vote	648,700	250,158	155,990
Percentage	11.5%	4.4%	2.8%

A European Parliament election was held in Portugal on 19 July 1987. It was the election of all 24 MEPs representing the Portugal constituency for the remainder of the 1984–1989 term of the European Parliament. Portugal had acceded to the European Community on 1 January 1986 and had been represented in the European Parliament by 24 appointed delegates until elections could be held. These elections took place on the same day of the legislative elections of 1987.

The Social Democrats (PSD) won the first European election by a landslide over the Socialists. The PSD won more than 37 percent of the votes, 15 points ahead of the PS. Note that a large chunk of the PSD vote in the 1987 legislative elections, held simultaneously with the European election, was from CDS voters that voted PSD in the general election and CDS in the EU elections, as CDS won 15 percent of the votes, compared with the 4 percent in the general election ballot. Together, the center-right parties won 53 percent of the votes.

The Socialists, headed by former PM Maria de Lourdes Pintasilgo, suffered a heavy defeat, polling at just 22 percent, matching their legislative election score. The Communist/Green alliance, Democratic Unity Coalition, polled 4th place and won 11.5 percent of the votes. Finally, the Democratic Renewal Party (PRD), also suffered a very heavy defeat, winning just 4 percent of the votes and electing a sole member for the EU Parliament.

Turnout in these elections was quite high, with 72.4 percent of voters casting a ballot.

== Electoral System ==
The voting method used, for the election of European members of parliament, is by proportional representation using the d'Hondt method, which is known to benefit leading parties. In the 1987 EU election, Portugal had 24 seats to be filled. Deputies are elected in a single constituency, corresponding to the entire national territory.

== Parties and candidates ==
The major parties that partook in the election, and their EP list leaders, were:

- Democratic Unity Coalition (CDU), Ângelo Veloso
- Socialist Party (PS), Maria de Lourdes Pintasilgo
- Democratic Renewal Party (PRD), José Medeiros Ferreira
- Social Democratic Party (PSD), Pedro Santana Lopes
- Democratic and Social Centre (CDS), Francisco Lucas Pires
- People's Monarchist Party (PPM), Miguel Esteves Cardoso

== Campaign period ==
=== Party slogans ===
Party or alliance	Original slogan	English translation	Refs
PSD	« Juntos vamos ganhar »	"Together we will win"	
PS	« Portugal para todos »	"Portugal for all"	
CDS	« Na hora Europeia »	"In European time"	
CDU	« Para defender Portugal »	"To defend Portugal"	
PRD	« Mais Portugal »	"More Portugal"	

== Results ==
Party and European Parliament group		Votes	%	Seats
Social Democratic Party	LDR	2,111,828	37.45	10
Socialist Party	SOC	1,267,672	22.48	6
Democratic and Social Centre	EPP	868,718	15.40	4
Unitary Democratic Coalition	COM	648,700	11.50	3
Democratic Renewal Party	EDA	250,158	4.44	1
People's Monarchist Party	NI	155,990	2.77	0
Popular Democratic Union	NI	52,835	0.94	0
Christian Democratic Party	NI	40,812	0.72	0
Revolutionary Socialist Party	NI	29,009	0.51	0
Portuguese Democratic Movement	NI	27,678	0.49	0
Communist Party (Reconstructed)	NI	24,060	0.43	0
Portuguese Workers' Communist Party	NI	19,475	0.35	0
Total		5,496,935	100.00	24
Valid votes		5,496,935	97.47	
Invalid votes		74,240	1.32	
Blank votes		68,475	1.21	
Total votes		5,639,650	100.00	
Registered voters/turnout		7,787,603	72.42	
Source: Comissão Nacional de Eleições

Vote share
PSD	37.45%
PS	22.48%
CDS	15.40%
CDU	11.50%
PRD	4.44%
PPM	2.77%
UDP	0.92%
PDC	0.72%
PSR	0.51%
Others	1.29%
Blank/Invalid	2.53%

Seats
PSD	41.67%
PS	25.00%
CDS	16.67%
CDU	12.50%
PRD	4.17%

=== Distribution by European group ===
Summary of political group distribution in the 2nd European Parliament (1984–1989)
Groups	Parties	Seats	Total	%
Liberal Democrat and Reform Party (LDR)	Social Democratic Party (PSD)	10	10	41.67
Socialist Group (SOC)	Socialist Party (PS)	6	6	25.00
European People's Party (EPP)	Democratic and Social Centre (CDS)	4	4	16.67
Communists and Allies (COM)	Portuguese Communist Party (PCP)	3	3	12.50
European Democratic Alliance (EDA)	Democratic Renewal Party (PRD)	1	1	4.17
Total		24	24	100.00

=== Maps ===
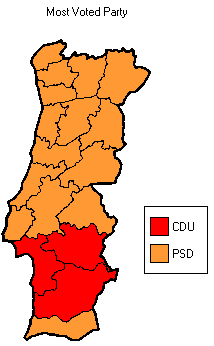
Most voted political force by district. (Azores and Madeira not shown)

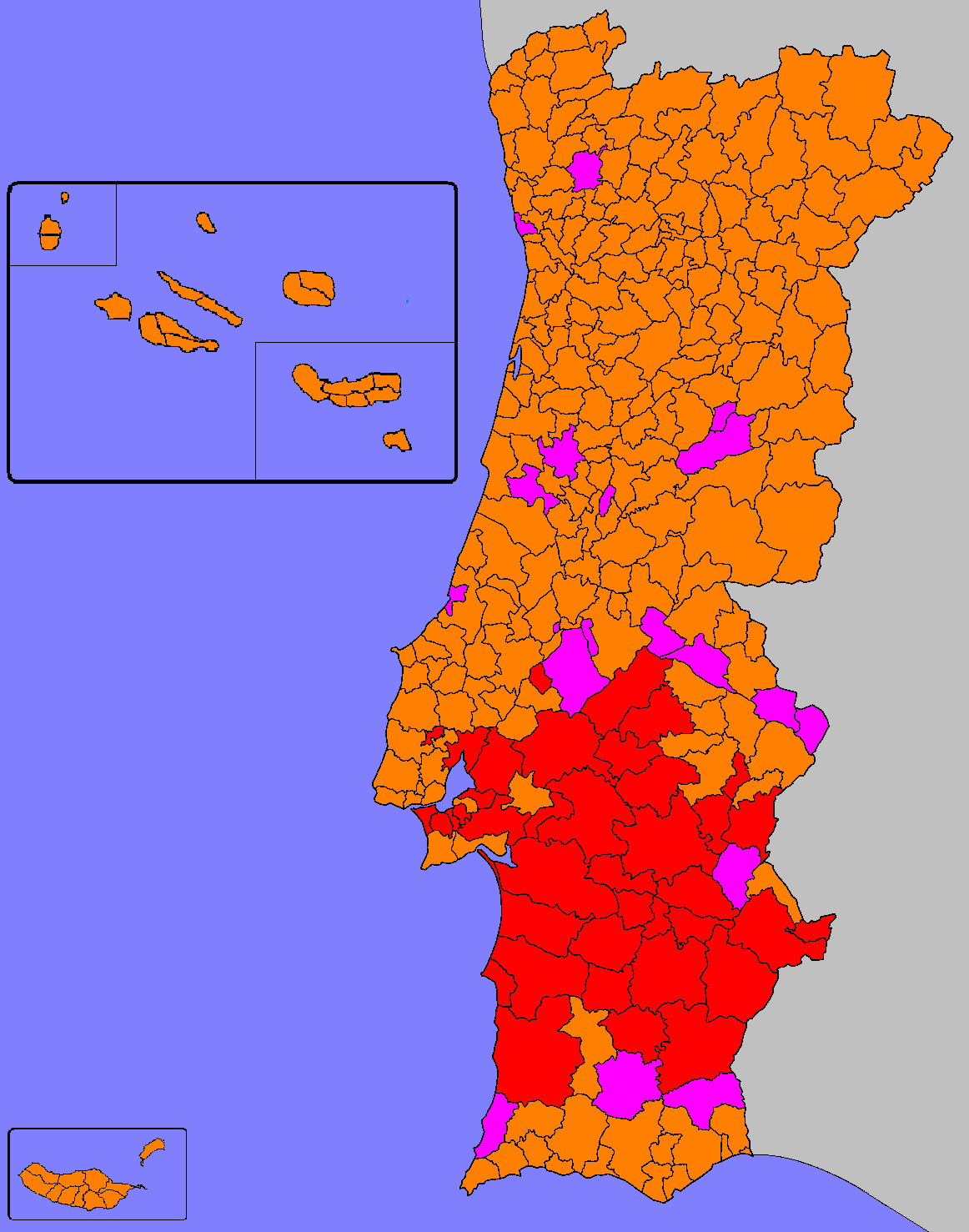
Most voted political force by municipality.

== See also ==
- Politics of Portugal
- List of political parties in Portugal
- Elections in Portugal
- European Parliament
