= Hermínio Martinho =

Portuguese politician

Hermínio Martinho ComMA

President of PRD
- In office 10 July 1985 – 19 October 1986
- Preceded by: Party established
- Succeeded by: Ramalho Eanes
- In office 29 May 1988 – 18 February 1990
- Preceded by: Ramalho Eanes
- Succeeded by: Pedro Canavarro

Personal details
- Born: 23 March 1946 (age 80) Tancos, Vila Nova da Barquinha, Portugal
- Party: PS (1979–1982) PRD (1985–1990) PSD (1997–2001)

Hermínio Paiva Fernandes Martinho ComMA (born 23 March 1946) is a Portuguese agricultural engineer and politician, who was the first president of the Democratic Renewal Party (PRD).

== Early life ==
Hermínio Martinho was born on 23 March 1946 in Tancos, Vila Nova da Barquinha, in the district of Santarém. He studied and did his military service in Santarém.

== Political career ==
Between 1979 and 1982, Martinho was an alderman in the Municipality of Santarém for the Socialist Party. In July 1985, Martinho was elected the first President of newly formed Democratic Renewal Party (PRD), a party that had the political support and mentoring of António Ramalho Eanes, then President of Portugal. In the 1985 Portuguese legislative election, under Martinho's leadership, the PRD achieved more than a million votes and won 45 seats in the Assembly of the Republic, making PRD the third political force in Portugal. Martinho was a deputy in the Assembly of the Republic between 1985 and 1991.

In 1986, after Ramalho Eanes ended his term as President of Portugal, Martinho formally invited Ramalho Eanes to be the President of the PRD, giving up his position. Following the disastrous results in the 1987 Portuguese legislative election, Ramalho Eanes resigned and Martinho was again elected President of the PRD in May 1988. In 1990 he resigned from his position after the party's bad results in the local election in 1989.

Between 1997 and 2001, Martinho was again elected alderman in the Municipality of Santarém, this time for the Social Democratic Party.

== Electoral history ==
=== Legislative election, 1985 ===
Ballot: 6 October 1985
Party	Candidate	Votes	%	Seats	+/−
PSD	Aníbal Cavaco Silva	1,732,288	29.9	88	+13
PS	Almeida Santos	1,204,321	20.8	57	–44
PRD	Hermínio Martinho	1,038,893	17.9	45	new
APU	Álvaro Cunhal	898,281	15.5	38	–6
CDS	Lucas Pires	577,580	10.0	22	–8
UDP	Mário Tomé	73,401	1.3	0	±0
Other parties		128,846	2.2	0	±0
Blank/Invalid ballots		145,319	2.5	–	–
Turnout		5,798,929	74.16	250	±0
Source: Comissão Nacional de Eleições

=== Lisbon City Council election, 1989 ===
Ballot: 17 December 1989
Party	Candidate	Votes	%	Seats	+/−
PS/CDU/MDP/CDE	Jorge Sampaio	180,635	49.1	9	+1
PSD/CDS/PPM	Marcelo Rebelo de Sousa	154,888	42.1	8	–1
PRD	Hermínio Martinho	11,453	3.1	0	new
PCTP/MRPP	Garcia Pereira	6,390	1.7	0	±0
FER	Gil Garcia	1,326	0.4	0	new
Blank/Invalid ballots		13,433	3.7	–	–
Turnout		368,125	54.76	17	±0
Source: Autárquicas 1989

== Awards and honors ==
- Portugal: Commander of the Order of Entrepreneurial Merit (Agricultural Merit) (1983)
- Italy: Commander of the Order of Merit of the Italian Republic (1990)
- Morocco: Commander of the Order of Ouissam Alaouite (1992)
