= Adriano Moreira =

Portuguese politician (1922–2022)

Adriano Moreira ComC GCC GOIH GCSE
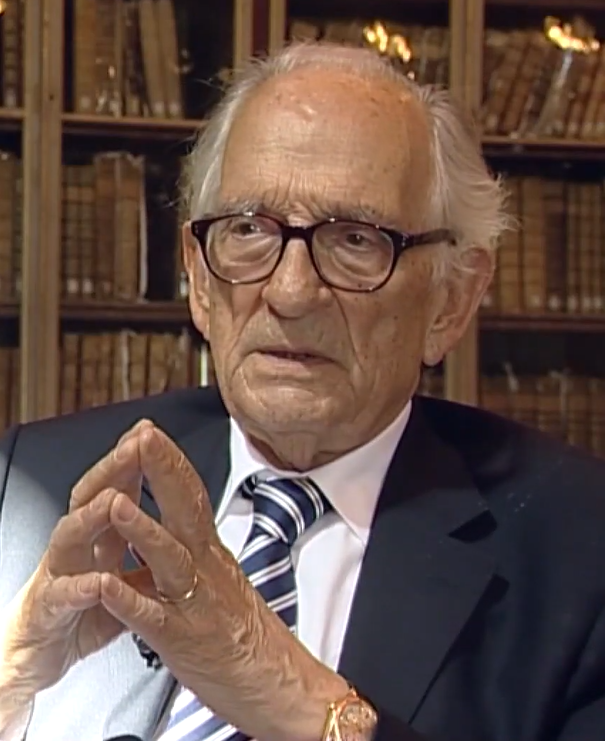

Member of the Council of State
- In office 12 January 2016 – 2019
- Appointed by: Assembly of the Republic
- President: Aníbal Cavaco Silva; Marcelo Rebelo de Sousa

President of the Democratic and Social Centre
- In office 13 April 1986 – 31 January 1988
- Preceded by: Francisco Lucas Pires
- Succeeded by: Diogo Freitas do Amaral

Member of the Assembly of the Republic Elections: 1980, 1983, 1985, 1987, 1991
- In office 13 August 1987 – 26 October 1995
- Constituency: Lisbon
- In office 31 May 1983 – 12 August 1987
- Constituency: Porto
- In office 13 November 1980 – 30 May 1983
- Constituency: Bragança

Minister of the Overseas Provinces
- In office 13 April 1961 – 4 December 1962
- Prime Minister: António de Oliveira Salazar
- Preceded by: Vasco Lopes Alves
- Succeeded by: António Augusto Peixoto Correia

Personal details
- Born: Adriano José Alves Moreira; 6 September 1922 Grijó de Vale Benfeito, Macedo de Cavaleiros, Portugal
- Died: 23 October 2022 (aged 100)
- Party: CDS – People's Party (1979–2022)
- Spouse: Mónica Isabel Maia de Lima Mayer
- Children: 6, including Isabel Moreira
- Education: University of Lisbon; Complutense University of Madrid
- Profession: Lawyer; Professor

Adriano José Alves Moreira, ComC GCC GOIH GCSE (6 September 1922 – 23 October 2022) was a Portuguese lawyer, professor and a leading political figure in Portugal throughout the second half of the 20th century.

== Education ==
Adriano Moreira was born in Macedo de Cavaleiros, Northern Portugal, son of António José Moreira and wife Leopoldina do Céu Alves, and graduated in Law from the Faculty of Law of the University of Lisbon in 1944. Later he would be awarded a doctorate from the Universidad Complutense de Madrid.

Moreira started as a sympathizer of the Portuguese Democratic Opposition movement; his name appeared on a list of signantes of the MUD in 1945. He was the lawyer of the family of General José Marques Godinho, who had been arrested (and who later died in prison) because of his attempt to overthrow the Salazar regime in 1947. The family of the general sued the minister at the time, Fernando Santos Costa, for his alleged responsibility in the death; several members of the family were themselves arrested, as, briefly, was Moreira himself.

With time, Moreira became closer to the Estado Novo. He was chosen to be the Portuguese minister for Overseas Territories in Salazar's cabinet. Noted for the legislative reforms that he introduced during his two years (1961–1963) in this role, he also played a vital part in founding two African institutions of higher education: the Estudos Gerais Universitários de Moçambique and the Estudos Gerais Universitários de Angola. From the 1974 Carnation Revolution until 1976 Moreira lived in Brazil.

Nevertheless, Moreira's influence over the CDS – People's Party, the conservative party of which he was president from 1986 to 1988 and which he represented as a deputy in the Portuguese Parliament between 1980 and 1995, was to be long-lasting. It enabled him to occupy an important place in the development of post-1974 politics. He was Vice-President of the Assembly of the Republic between 1991 and 1995. Meanwhile, he served as a professor at the Instituto Superior de Ciências Sociais e Políticas of the Universidade Técnica de Lisboa (Technical University of Lisbon). His published works include A Europa em Formação (Lisbon, 1974), Ciência Política (Lisbon, 1979), and Teoria das Relações Internacionais (Coimbra, 1996).

Moreira married Isabel Mónica Maia de Lima Mayer (born at Mercês, Lisbon, on 2 August 1945) on 30 August 1968 at São Martinho, Sintra. Her paternal grandfather had distant Ashkenazi Jewish and Sephardic Jewish ancestry and her paternal grandmother was Irish. The couple had six children. His daughter, Isabel Moreira, is a Deputy in the Assembly of the Republic, representing the Portuguese Socialist Party (PS).

Following his retirement, Moreira was still an influential voice in the country. He was one of the five personalities elected by the Assembly of the Republic to the Council of State on 18 December 2015, and he took office on 12 January 2016, his term having ended after the following election, in 2019.

Moreira turned 100 on 6 September 2022, and died on 23 October. He was the longest lived politician in the history of Portuguese democracy.

== Electoral history ==
=== CDS leadership election, 1986 ===
Ballot: 13 April 1986
Candidate	Votes	%
Adriano Moreira	533	54.2
João Morais Leitão	451	45.8
Turnout	984	
Source: CDS Congress

=== Legislative election, 1987 ===
Ballot: 19 July 1987
Party	Candidate	Votes	%	Seats	+/−
PSD	Aníbal Cavaco Silva	2,850,784	50.2	148	+60
PS	Vítor Constâncio	1,262,506	22.2	60	+3
CDU	Álvaro Cunhal	689,137	12.1	31	–7
PRD	António Ramalho Eanes	278,561	4.9	7	–38
CDS	Adriano Moreira	251,987	4.4	4	–18
Other parties		219,715	3.9	0	±0
Blank/Invalid ballots		123,668	2.2	–	–
Turnout		5,676,358	71.57	250	±0
Source: Comissão Nacional de Eleições

== Affiliations, awards, decorations ==
=== Affiliations ===
- Member of the Academia Brasileira de Letras, Academia das Ciências de Lisboa, Academia de Marinha, Academia de Ciencias Morales y Politicas de Madrid and Academia Portuguesa da História.

=== Awards ===
- Doctor Honoris Causa by the Aberta University, University of Beira Interior, and University of Aveiro in Portugal; and by the Universities of Manaus, Brasília, São Paulo, and Rio de Janeiro, in Brazil.

=== Decorations ===
- Commander of the Order of Christ, Portugal (5 September 1957)
- Grand-Officer of the Order of Prince Henry, Portugal (3 January 1951)
- Grand-Cross of the Order of Christ, Portugal (19 December 1962)
- Commander of the Order of Ouissam Alaouite, Morocco (6 February 1992)
- Grand-Cross of the Military Order of Saint James of the Sword, Portugal (10 June 1992)
