= European Parliament election, 1987 =

European Parliament election, 1987 may refer to:

- European Parliament election, 1987 (Spain)
- European Parliament election, 1987 (Portugal)
