= 1989 Portuguese local elections =

- 17 December 1989

All 305 Portuguese municipalities and 4,260 Portuguese Parishes All 1,997 local government councils
- Turnout: 60.9% ▼3.0 pp
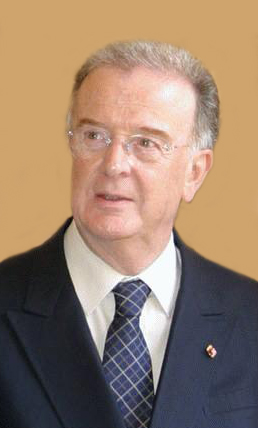

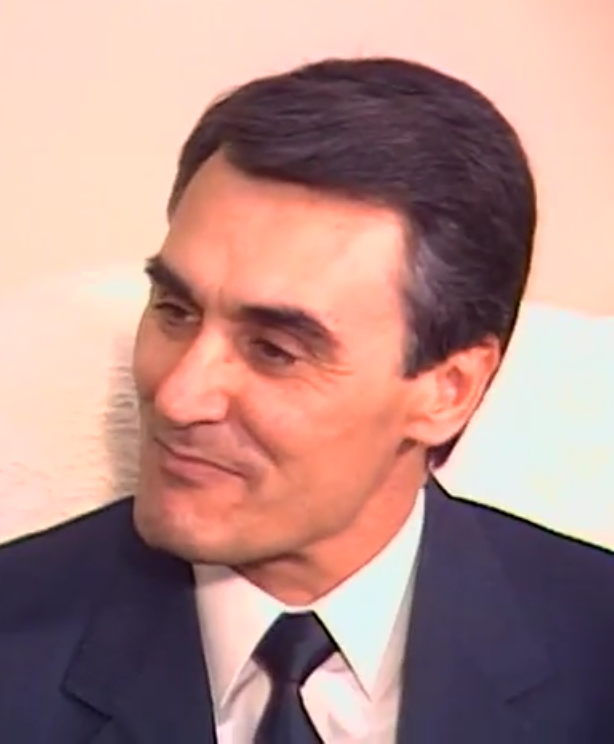

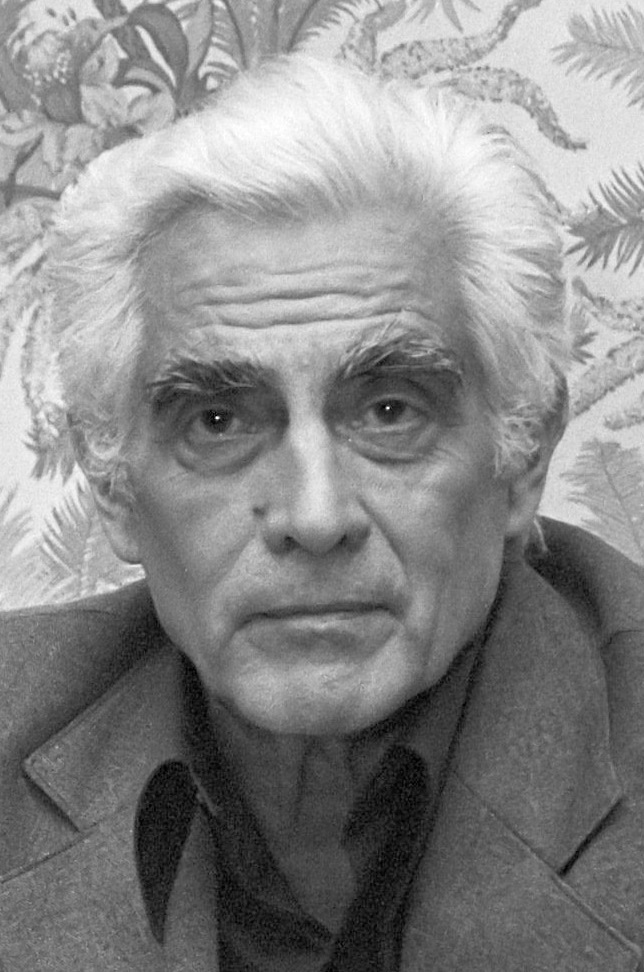

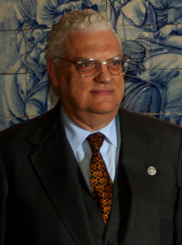
	First party	Second party
Leader	Jorge Sampaio	Aníbal Cavaco Silva
Party	PS	PSD
Last election	79 mayors, 27.4%	149 mayors, 34.0%
Popular vote	1,814,105	1,745,814
Percentage	36.7%	35.3%
Swing	▲9.3 pp	▲1.3 pp
Mayors	120	114
Mayors +/–	▲41	▼35
Councillors	752	794
Councillors +/–	▲181	▼28
	Third party	Fourth party
Leader	Álvaro Cunhal	Diogo Freitas do Amaral
Party	PCP	CDS
Alliance	CDU
Last election	47 mayors, 19.4%	27 mayors, 9.7%
Popular vote	656,654	452,110
Percentage	13.3%	9.1%
Swing	▼6.1 pp	▼0.6 pp
Mayors	50	20
Mayors +/–	▲3	▼7
Councillors	257	179
Councillors +/–	▼48	▼45

Local elections were held in Portugal on 17 December 1989. The elections consisted of three separate elections in the 305 Portuguese municipalities, the election for the Municipal Chambers, another election for the Municipal Assembly and a last one for the lower-level Parish Assembly, whose winner is elected parish president. This last was held separately in the more than 4,200 parishes around the country.

For the first time since democracy was restored, the center-left to left-wing parties won a nationwide local election. The Socialist Party won the status of largest local party, a title the Socialists would hold on until 2001, and gained control of many big cities across the country, like Lisbon and Porto. In Lisbon, the PS leader, Jorge Sampaio, in a coalition with CDU, defeated the PSD/CDS candidate, Marcelo Rebelo de Sousa, by a 49 to 42 percent margin. The Socialists had a net gain of 41 cities, winning important cities like Guimarães, Coimbra, Faro and Vila Nova de Gaia.

The Social Democrats (PSD), were the big losers of the elections. The party lost its status as the largest local party and suffered heavy losses across the country, particularly in the big cities. The PSD lost a total of 35 cities, although was able to increase its vote share to 35 percent. The results contrasted with the landslide election victory of the PSD in the 1987 general elections. Many of Cavaco Silva's government policies such as privatizations, which was creating some unemployment, or the tensions with some workers unions, like the Police protests in April 1989, may have had a negative effect on the PSD's results.

The Democratic Unity Coalition (CDU) gained 3 cities, compared with 1985, and maintained their control of the Alentejo region. Nonetheless, the Communist/Green coalition suffered a big drop in its vote share, dropping 6 points to around 13 percent. The CDU was able to hold on to their bastions of Beja, Évora and Almada.

The Democratic and Social Centre (CDS), just like the PSD, had a very poor showing, winning 20 cities, a drop of 7 cities. The party lost some important cities to either the PS or PSD, such as Póvoa de Varzim, Leiria and Viseu. At the same time, CDS made several coalitions with the PS in Azores and Madeira, and, together, the PS/CDS coalitions won a combined total of 3 cities. Other smaller parties also made gains, like the UDP which gained Machico, Madeira islands, from the PSD

Turnout in these elections was lower compared with 4 years ago, with 60.9 percent of the electorate casting a ballot.

== Background ==
=== Electoral system ===
All 305 municipalities are allocated a certain number of councilors to elect corresponding to the number of registered voters in a given municipality. Each party or coalition must present a list of candidates. The winner of the most voted list for the municipal council is automatically elected mayor, similar to first-past-the-post (FPTP). The lists are closed and the seats in each municipality are apportioned according to the D'Hondt method.

=== By-elections (1985–1989) ===
During the normal four-year term of local governments, one municipal council by-election was held in the municipality of Fundão on 18 October 1987, adding to this, one hundred and fifty-nine parishes also held a by-election for parish assemblies.

City control in by-elections (1985–1989)
Date	Municipality	Population	Previous control	New control
18 October 1987	Fundão	32,089	Social Democratic Party (PSD)	Socialist Party (PS)

== Parties ==
The main political forces involved in the election were:

- Democratic and Social Centre (CDS)^{1}, ^{2}
- Unitary Democratic Coalition (CDU)^{1}
- Socialist Party (PS)^{1}
- Social Democratic Party (PSD) ^{2}

^{1} The PS formed coalitions with CDS, CDU and MDP/CDE in several municipalities.
^{2} The PS formed coalitions with CDS and PPM in some municipalities.

== Results ==
=== Municipal Councils ===
==== National summary of votes and seats ====
Summary of the 17 December 1989 Municipal Councils elections results
Parties	Votes	%	±pp swing	Candidacies	Councillors		Mayors	
Parties	Votes	%	±pp swing	Candidacies	Total	±	Total	±
Socialist	1,598,571	32.32	▲4.9	296	728	▲157	116	▲37
Social Democratic	1,552,846	31.39	▼2.6	299	781	▼41	113	▼36
Democratic Unity Coalition	633,682	12.81	▼6.6	302	252	▼53	50	▲3
Democratic and Social Centre	451,163	9.12	▼0.6	182	179	▼45	20	▼7
PS / CDU / MDP/CDE	180,635	3.65	—	1	9	—	1	—
PSD / CDS / PPM	161,420	3.26	—	2	9	—	0	—
Democratic Renewal	38,452	0.78	▼4.0	32	4	▼47	0	▼3
PS / CDS	34,899	0.71	—	4	15	—	3	—
PSD / CDS	31,548	0.64	—	1	4	—	1	—
CDU / PRD	22,972	0.46	—	2	5	—	0	—
Portuguese Workers' Communist	21,979	0.44	▲0.2	20	0	0	0	0
Popular Democratic Union	16,093	0.33	▼0.3	30	4	▲1	1	▲1
Portuguese Democratic Movement	11,354	0.23	—	6	1	—	0	—
Christian Democratic	5,662	0.11	▼0.1	4	1	▼1	0	0
MDP/CDE / PRD	3,585	0.07	—	2	2	—	0	—
People's Monarchist	2,765	0.06	▼0.4	6	1	▼2	0	0
Left Revolutionary Front	2,390	0.05	—	5	0	—	0	—
CDS / PS	947	0.02	—	1	1	—	0	—
PRD / MDP/CDE	710	0.01	—	1	1	—	0	—
Democratic Party of the Atlantic	348	0.01	—	3	0	—	0	—
**Total valid**	**4,772,021**	**96.48**	**▼0.3**	—	**1,997**	**▲16**	**305**	**0**
Blank ballots	91,248	1.84	▲0.2					
Invalid ballots	82,927	1.68	▲0.1					
**Total**	**4,946,196**	**100.00**						
Registered voters/turnout	8,121,045	60.91	▼3.0					

==== Municipality map ====
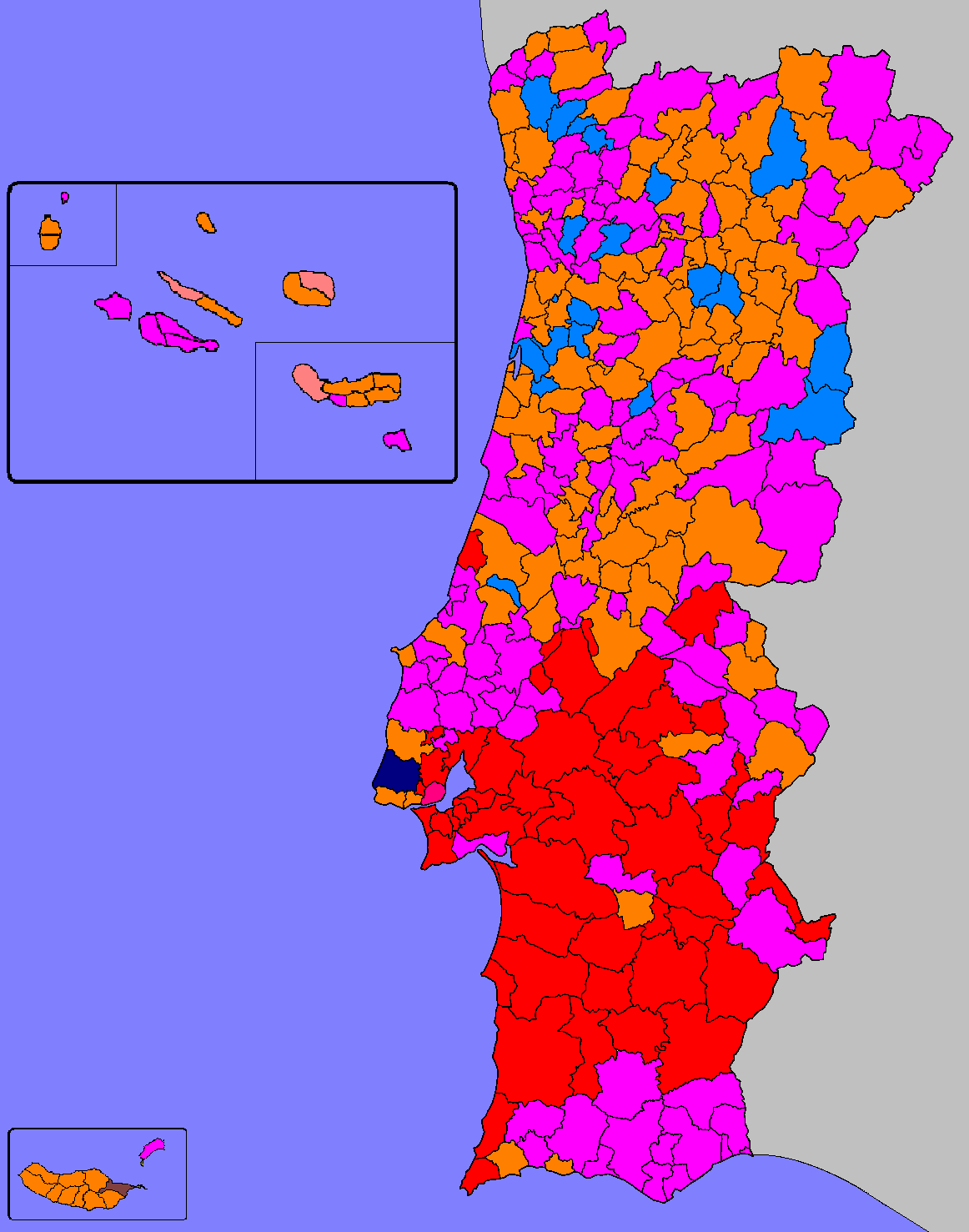
Most voted parties or coalitions in each Municipality. Municipalities won by: ■ - PSD: 113 ■ - PS: 116 ■ - CDU: 50 ■ - CDS: 20 ■ - UDP: 1 ■ - PSD coalitions: 1 ■ - PS coalitions: 4

==== City control ====
The following table lists party control in all district capitals, highlighted in bold, as well as in municipalities above 100,000 inhabitants. Population estimates from the 1981 Census.

Municipality	Population	Previous control	New control
Almada	147,690	Unitary Democratic Coalition (CDU)	Unitary Democratic Coalition (CDU)
Amadora	163,878	Unitary Democratic Coalition (CDU)	Unitary Democratic Coalition (CDU)
**Aveiro**	60,284	Democratic and Social Centre (CDS)	Democratic and Social Centre (CDS)
Barcelos	103,773	Social Democratic Party (PSD)	Social Democratic Party (PSD)
**Beja**	38,246	Unitary Democratic Coalition (CDU)	Unitary Democratic Coalition (CDU)
**Braga**	125,472	Socialist Party (PS)	Socialist Party (PS)
**Bragança**	35,380	Democratic and Social Centre (CDS)	Socialist Party (PS)
Cascais	141,498	Social Democratic Party (PSD)	Social Democratic Party (PSD)
**Castelo Branco**	54,908	Social Democratic Party (PSD)	Social Democratic Party (PSD)
**Coimbra**	138,930	Social Democratic Party (PSD)	Socialist Party (PS)
**Évora**	51,572	Unitary Democratic Coalition (CDU)	Unitary Democratic Coalition (CDU)
**Faro**	45,109	Social Democratic Party (PSD)	Socialist Party (PS)
**Funchal**	112,746	Social Democratic Party (PSD)	Social Democratic Party (PSD)
Gondomar	130,751	Socialist Party (PS)	Socialist Party (PS)
**Guarda**	40,360	Socialist Party (PS)	Socialist Party (PS)
Guimarães	146,959	Social Democratic Party (PSD)	Socialist Party (PS)
**Leiria**	96,517	Democratic and Social Centre (CDS)	Social Democratic Party (PSD)
**Lisbon** (details)	807,937	Social Democratic Party (PSD)	PS / CDU / MDP/CDE
Loures	276,467	Unitary Democratic Coalition (CDU)	Unitary Democratic Coalition (CDU)
Matosinhos	136,498	Socialist Party (PS)	Socialist Party (PS)
Oeiras	149,328	Social Democratic Party (PSD)	Social Democratic Party (PSD)
**Ponta Delgada**	63,804	Social Democratic Party (PSD)	PS / CDS
**Portalegre**	27,313	Socialist Party (PS)	Social Democratic Party (PSD)
**Porto**	327,368	Social Democratic Party (PSD)	Socialist Party (PS)
**Santarém**	62,896	Socialist Party (PS)	Socialist Party (PS)
Santa Maria da Feira	109,531	Social Democratic Party (PSD)	Social Democratic Party (PSD)
**Setúbal**	98,366	Socialist Party (PS)	Socialist Party (PS)
Sintra	226,428	Social Democratic Party (PSD)	PSD / CDS
**Viana do Castelo**	81,009	Social Democratic Party (PSD)	Social Democratic Party (PSD)
Vila Nova de Famalicão	106,508	Socialist Party (PS)	Socialist Party (PS)
Vila Nova de Gaia	226,331	Social Democratic Party (PSD)	Socialist Party (PS)
**Vila Real**	47,020	Social Democratic Party (PSD)	Social Democratic Party (PSD)
**Viseu**	83,261	Democratic and Social Centre (CDS)	Social Democratic Party (PSD)

=== Municipal Assemblies ===
==== National summary of votes and seats ====
Summary of the 17 December 1989 Municipal Assemblies elections results
Parties	Votes	%	±pp swing	Candidacies	Mandates	
Parties	Votes	%	±pp swing	Candidacies	Total	±
Socialist	1,586,289	32.08	▲8.0		2,445	▲628
Social Democratic	1,547,663	31.30	▲1.7		2,582	▲43
Democratic Unity Coalition	656,056	13.27	▼6.7		848	▼214
Democratic and Social Centre	440,521	8.91	▼7.2		698	▼321
PS / CDU / MDP/CDE	182,140	3.68	—		28	—
PSD / CDS / PPM	163,502	3.31	—		29	—
Democratic Renewal	40,942	0.83	▼4.5		25	▼245
PS / CDS	33,795	0.68	—		41	—
PSD / CDS	31,537	0.64	—		12	—
CDU / PRD	23,416	0.47	—		18	—
Popular Democratic Union	17,732	0.36	▼0.3		14	0
Portuguese Workers' Communist	10,864	0.22	▲0.1		0	0
Portuguese Democratic Movement	9,305	0.19	—		6	—
Christian Democratic	4,932	0.10	▲0.0		3	▲1
MDP/CDE / PRD	2,782	0.06	—		4	—
People's Monarchist	1,857	0.04	▼0.3		2	▼5
Democratic Party of the Atlantic	1,347	0.03	—		1	—
CDS / PS	981	0.02	—		4	—
PRD / MDP/CDE	505	0.01	—		2	—
**Total valid**	**4,756,166**	**96.19**	**▼0.3**	—	**6,763**	**▲33**
Blank ballots	104,452	2.11	▲0.2			
Invalid ballots	84,079	1.70	▲0.1			
**Total**	**4,944,697**	**100.00**				
Registered voters/turnout	8,121,045	60.89	▼3.0			

=== Parish Assemblies ===
==== National summary of votes and seats ====
Summary of the 17 December 1989 Parish Assemblies elections results
Parties	Votes	%	±pp swing	Candidacies	Mandates		Presidents	
Parties	Votes	%	±pp swing	Candidacies	Total	±	Total	±
Social Democratic	1,560,061	31.70	▼1.1		13,261	▲144	1,692	▼149
Socialist	1,525,363	30.99	▲4.0		11,201	▲2,157	1,358	▲357
Democratic Unity Coalition	669,170	13.60	▼7.0		2,929	▼746	339	▼16
Democratic and Social Centre	396,979	8.07	▼2.4		3,434	▼1,098	348	▼170
PS / CDU / MDP/CDE	183,027	3.72	—		390	—	37	—
PSD / CDS / PPM	166,180	3.38	—		347	—	16	—
Independents	94,274	1.92	▲0.5		1,018	▲225	141	▲34
PS / CDS	31,714	0.64	—		177	—	13	—
Democratic Renewal	29,811	0.61	▼2.8		59	▼667	2	▼38
Popular Democratic Union	24,245	0.49	▼0.1		30	▲4	2	▲1
CDU / PRD	22,710	0.46	—		94	—	10	—
PSD / CDS	22,358	0.45	—		59	—	8	—
Portuguese Democratic Movement	7,625	0.15	—		13	—	0	—
Portuguese Workers' Communist	4,514	0.09	0.0		0	0	0	0
People's Monarchist	1,248	0.03	▼0.0		9	▼15	0	▼2
Democratic Party of the Atlantic	1,153	0.02	—		3	—	0	—
Christian Democratic	1,066	0.02	0.0		6	▲2	1	▲1
CDS / PS	955	0.02	—		8	—	0	—
MDP/CDE / PRD	952	0.02	—		5	—	0	—
PRD / MDP/CDE	213	0.00	—		1	—	0	—
**Total valid**	**4,743,618**	**96.37**	**▼0.2**	—	**33,044**	**▲1,103**	**3,967**	**▲102**
Blank ballots	90,645	1.84	▲0.1					
Invalid ballots	87,840	1.78	▲0.1					
**Total**	**4,922,103**	**100.00**						
Registered voters/turnout	8,086,572	60.87	▼3.0					

== See also ==
- Politics of Portugal
- List of political parties in Portugal
- Elections in Portugal
