= 1987 Portuguese legislative election =

- 19 July 1987

All 250 seats in the Assembly of the Republic 126 seats needed for a majority
- Registered: 7,930,668 ▲1.4%
- Turnout: 5,676,358 (71.6%) ▼2.6 pp
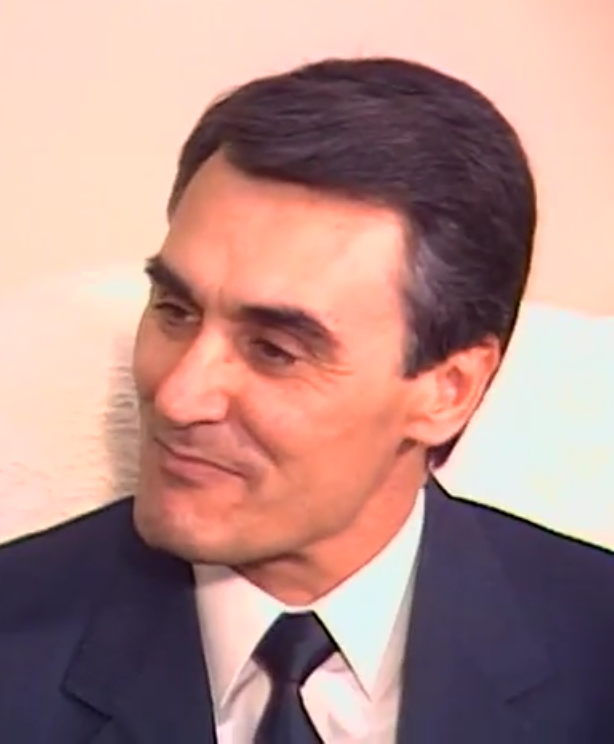

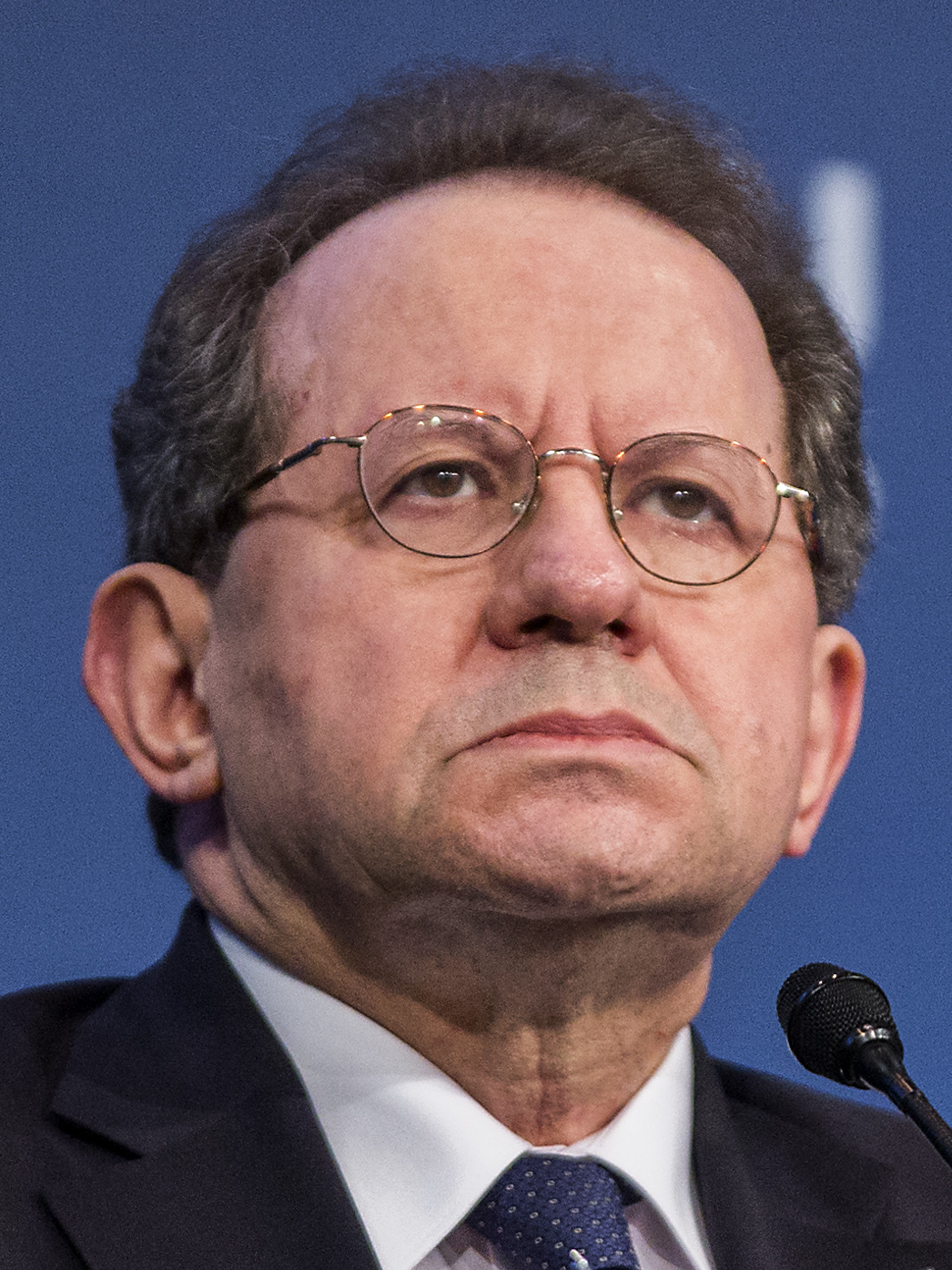

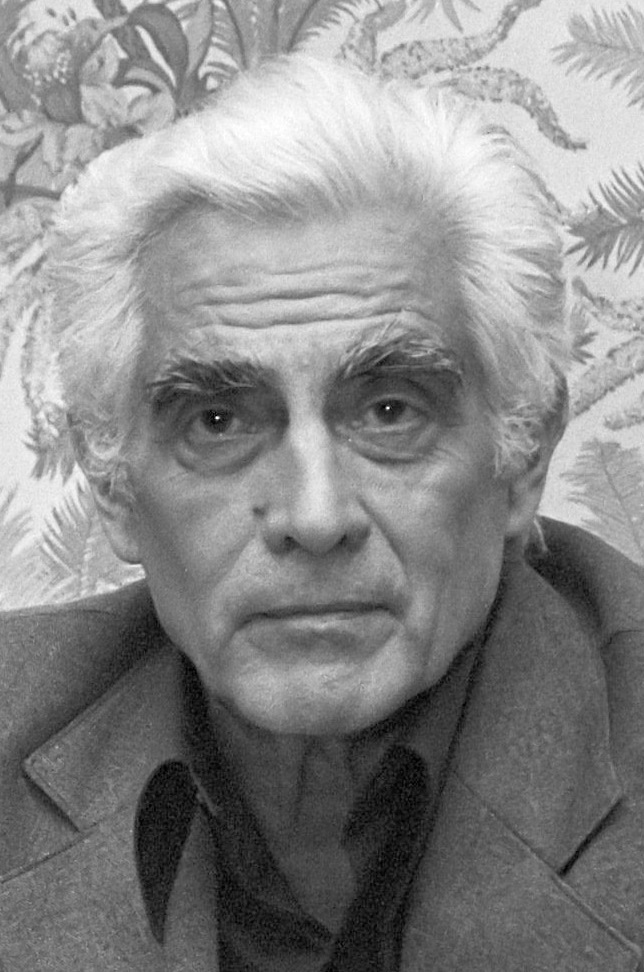

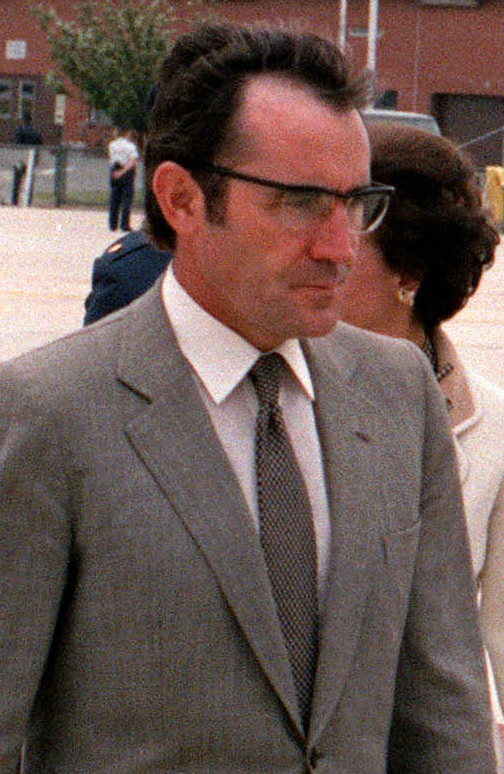

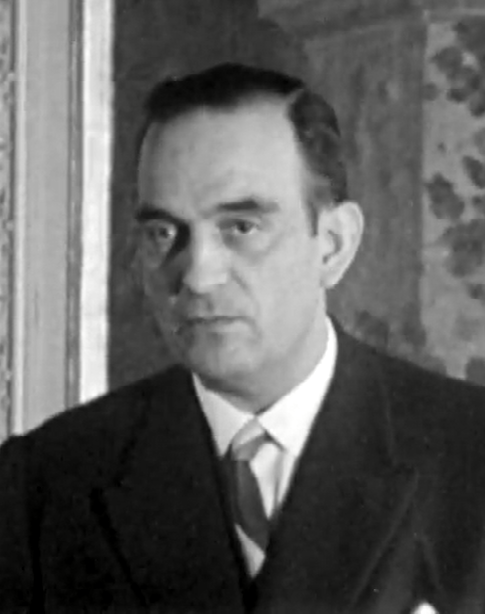
	First party	Second party	Third party
Leader	Aníbal Cavaco Silva	Vítor Constâncio	Álvaro Cunhal
Party	PSD	PS	PCP
Alliance			CDU
Leader since	2 June 1985	29 June 1986	30 September 1987
Leader's seat	Lisbon	Lisbon	Lisbon
Last election	88 seats, 29.9%	57 seats, 20.8%	38 seats, 15.5%
Seats won	148	60	31
Seat change	▲60	▲3	▼7
Popular vote	2,850,784	1,262,506	689,137
Percentage	50.2%	22.2%	12.1%
Swing	▲20.3 pp	▲1.4 pp	▼3.4 pp
	Fourth party	Fifth party
Leader	Ramalho Eanes	Adriano Moreira
Party	PRD	CDS
Leader since	19 October 1986	13 April 1986
Leader's seat	Lisbon	Lisbon
Last election	45 seats, 17.9%	22 seats, 10.0%
Seats won	7	4
Seat change	▼38	▼18
Popular vote	278,561	251,987
Percentage	4.9%	4.4%
Swing	▼13.0 pp	▼5.6 pp
Prime Minister before election
Aníbal Cavaco Silva
PSD
Prime Minister after election
Aníbal Cavaco Silva
PSD

The 1987 Portuguese legislative election took place on 19 July. The election renewed all 250 members of the Assembly of the Republic.

In the previous election, in 1985, the Social Democratic Party (PSD) received the most votes and managed to form a minority government, remaining in power thanks to the confidence and supply of the Democratic and Social Center (CDS) and the Democratic Renewal Party (PRD), but after a motion of no confidence presented by left-wing parties was approved, the government fell and a new election was called.

The PSD was reelected in a landslide, winning a majority government with just over 50 percent of the votes and 148 of the 250 seats, a majority of 46. Not only was this the most seats that a Portuguese party had ever won in a free election, but it was the first time since the Carnation Revolution that a single party won an absolute majority. Although the PSD was leading in voting intentions going into the election, the size of its victory far exceeded the party's most optimistic expectations. The PSD won every district with the exception of Setúbal, Évora and Beja, which voted for the CDU.

The Socialist Party (PS) gained a few seats and got a slightly higher share of the vote, 22 percent compared with the almost 21 percent in 1985, but the scale of the PSD victory made the party lose most of its influence. Like in 1979, 1980 and 1985, the PS failed to win a single district. The left-wing Unitary Democratic Coalition (CDU) lost some ground, minus seven MPs and a drop to 12 percent, while the Democratic Renewal Party (PRD), now led by former President António Ramalho Eanes, lost all of its influence, mainly due to its responsibility in the fall of the PSD minority government. The right-wing Democratic and Social Center (CDS) lost almost half of its vote share, due to the effect of tactical voting for the also right-wing Social Democratic Party.

European elections were held on the same day.

== Background ==
Despite being able to form a minority government after the 1985 election, Cavaco's term was quite tense, with many conflicts between the government and the opposition in Parliament, and notwithstanding the approval of two state budgets, several of the policy reforms proposed by the government were rejected. Just a few weeks after Cavaco took office, Portugal officially became a member state of the European Economic Community, spurring a major transformation of the country's economy.

=== Fall of the government ===
In the first months of 1987, a trip of a Portuguese parliamentary delegation to the Soviet Union, which also passed by Estonia, a territory that wasn't recognized by Portugal as under Soviet control, created a diplomatic issue that was used by the Opposition to bring down Cavaco Silva's minority government. In April, Parliament approved, by 134 votes to 108, a motion of no confidence proposed by PRD, and the government fell. President Mário Soares rejected the opposition's proposal for an alternative PS-PRD-CDU government, deciding instead to dissolve Parliament and call a snap election.

=== Leadership changes and challenges ===
==== Democratic and Social Center ====
The 1985 general election results were quite disappointing for CDS, and then party leader Francisco Lucas Pires resigned from the leadership. Adriano Moreira, supported by the more conservative wings, and João Morais Leitão, supported by the more "centrist" wings of the party, were the two candidates running for the leadership in the April 1986 congress. Adriano Moreira was elected new party leader by an 82-vote difference. The results were the following:

Ballot: 13 April 1986
Candidate	Votes	%
Adriano Moreira	533	54.2
João Morais Leitão	451	45.8
Turnout	984	
Source: Results

==== Socialist Party ====
For the 1985 general election, the PS nominated António Almeida Santos as prime ministerial candidate, while an interim leadership, headed by António Macedo, ran the party, but the Socialists achieved their worst result ever, just 20.8 percent. A few months later, the PS supported candidate for the Presidency of the Republic, Mário Soares, was narrowly elected to that post by a 51 to 49 percent margin against Diogo Freitas do Amaral, the candidate supported by CDS and PSD. After that victory, the party called a congress to elect a new leader for late June 1986. There were two candidates on the ballot, Vítor Constâncio and Jaime Gama. Vítor Constâncio was elected as new party leader.

Ballot: 29 June 1986
Candidate	Votes	%
Vítor Constâncio		79
Jaime Gama		21
Turnout		
Source: Acção Socialista

==== Democratic Renewal Party ====
The Democratic Renewal Party surprised with their excellent result in the 1985 election, winning almost 18 percent of the votes. António Ramalho Eanes, the main figure and inspiration for PRD, left the post of President of the Republic in March 1986, and, a few months later, in October of the same year, was unanimously elected as the new leader of the PRD, succeeding Hermínio Martinho.

Ballot: 19 October 1986
Candidate	Votes	%
António Ramalho Eanes	Voice vote	
Turnout		100.0

== Electoral system ==
The Assembly of the Republic has 250 members elected to four-year terms. Governments do not require absolute majority support of the Assembly to hold office, as even if the number of opposers of government is larger than that of the supporters, the number of opposers still needs to be equal or greater than 126 (absolute majority) for both the Government's Programme to be rejected or for a motion of no confidence to be approved.

The number of seats assigned to each district depends on the district magnitude. The use of the d'Hondt method makes for a higher effective threshold than certain other allocation methods such as the Hare quota or Sainte-Laguë method, which are more generous to small parties.

For these elections, and compared with the 1985 elections, the MPs distributed by districts were the following:

District	Number of MPs	Map
Lisbon	56	
Porto	39	
Braga^{(+1)} and Setúbal	17	
Aveiro	15	
Santarém	12	
Leiria and Coimbra	11	
Viseu	10	
Faro	9	
Castelo Branco, Viana do Castelo and Vila Real	6	
Azores, Beja, Guarda and Madeira	5	
Bragança and Évora^{(–1)}	4	
Portalegre	3	
Europe and Outside Europe	2	

== Parties ==
The table below lists the parties represented in the Assembly of the Republic during the 4th legislature (1985–1987) and that also partook in the election:

Name		Ideology	Political position	Leader	1985 result		Seats at dissolution
Name		Ideology	Political position	Leader	%	Seats	Seats at dissolution
PPD/PSD	Social Democratic Party; Partido Social Democrata	Liberal conservatism Classical liberalism	Centre-right	Aníbal Cavaco Silva	29.9%	88 / 250	87 / 250
PS	Socialist Party; Partido Socialista	Social democracy	Centre-left	Vítor Constâncio	20.8%	57 / 250	56 / 250
PRD	Democratic Renewal Party; Partido Renovador Democrático	Centrism; Third Way	Centre	António Ramalho Eanes	17.9%	45 / 250	45 / 250
PCP	Portuguese Communist Party; Partido Comunista Português	Communism; Marxism–Leninism	Far-left	Álvaro Cunhal	15.5% (Note: The Portuguese Communist Party (PCP) and the Portuguese Democratic Movement (MDP/CDE) contested the 1985 election in a coalition called United People Alliance (APU) and won a combined 15.5% of the vote and elected 39 MPs to parliament.)	35 / 250	34 / 250
MDP/CDE	Portuguese Democratic Movement; Movimento Democrático Português	Left-wing nationalism Democratic socialism	Left-wing	José Manuel Tengarrinha	15.5%	3 / 250	3 / 250
CDS	Democratic and Social Centre; Centro Democrático e Social	Christian democracy Conservatism	Centre-right to right-wing	Adriano Moreira	10.0%	22 / 250	22 / 250
Ind.	Independent; Independente	Gonçalo Ribeiro Telles (left the Socialist Party caucus); Maria Amélia Santos (left the Portuguese Communist Party caucus); Rui Oliveira e Costa (left the Social Democratic Party caucus)					3 / 250

=== Seat changes ===
- On 16 November 1985, MP Gonçalo Ribeiro Telles, elected in the Socialist Party list for Porto, left the party and became an Independent, following the agreement he made with the party in order to be elected.
- Also on 16 November 1985, MP Maria Amélia Santos, elected in the United People Alliance list for Lisbon, became an Independent representing the Ecologist Party "The Greens".
- On 24 June 1986, MP Rui Oliveira e Costa, elected in the Social Democratic Party list for Lisbon, became an Independent after leaving the PSD caucus following disagreements with the party's leadership regarding policy and the 1986 presidential election.

== Campaign period ==
=== Issues ===
The campaign was dominated by the need for stability, the country had 16 governments since 1974, a booming economy and falling inflation. The Social Democratic Party (PSD), under the leadership of Prime Minister Cavaco Silva, campaigned on the strong economy and the need for a stable government to enact reforms, warning of "hard times" if no stability was reached. The Socialist Party (PS) ran under the motto that only they could stop the "reactionary" Social Democrats, as party leader Vítor Constâncio put it, while the Democratic Renewal Party (PRD) accused Cavaco Silva of being arrogant. On the left-wing, the campaign was also marked by the dissolution of the United People Alliance (APU), following internal tensions with the Portuguese Democratic Movement (MDP) in 1986, and the formation of a new coalition, the Unitary Democratic Coalition (CDU).

=== Party slogans ===
Party or alliance	Original slogan	English translation	Refs
PSD	« Portugal não pode parar »	"Portugal cannot stop"	
PS	« A alternativa »	"The alternative"	
CDU	« CDU, É melhor para Portugal »	"CDU, It's better for Portugal"	
PRD	« Agora Portugal »	"Now Portugal"	
CDS	« Vote prá maioria »	"Vote for the majority"	

=== Candidates' debates ===
No debates between the main parties were held as the PSD leader and Prime Minister, Aníbal Cavaco Silva, refused to take part in any debate.

== Opinion polling ==
The following table shows the opinion polls of voting intention of the Portuguese voters before the election. Included is also the result of the Portuguese general elections in 1985 and 1987 for reference.

Exit poll

Polling firm/Link	Date Released	PSD	PS	PRD	CDU	CDS	O	Lead
1987 legislative election	19 Jul 1987	50.2; 148	22.2; 60	4.9; 7	12.1; 31	4.4; 4	6.2; 0	28.0
RTP1	19 Jul 1987	48–50	21–23	5–7	12.5–14.5	3–5	–	27
Antena1	19 Jul 1987	45–47	24–25	–	–	–	–	21–22
Rádio Comercial	19 Jul 1987	50.1	21.9	5.7	12.1	4.0	6.2	28.2
Euroexpansão	17 Jul 1987	41–44	22–25	11–14	13–15	4–6	–	19
Euroexpansão	12 Jun 1987	37	28	–	–	–	–	9
O Semanário	12 Jun 1987	39–41	21–23	–	–	–	–	18
IEP	29 Apr 1987	38.5	21.7	11.5	12.3	5.6	10.6	16.8
Unknown	16 Apr 1987	37–39	27–29	8	12–13	7	–	10
Unknown	16 Apr 1987	38	28	8	14	8	4	10
Unknown	16 Apr 1987	41–44	22	7	15	8	–	19–22
Euroexpansão	14 Mar 1987	41.3	27.2	11.1	8.8	7.5	4.1	14.1
Euroexpansão	Feb 1987	41.7	28.8	11.5	8.6	5.5	3.9	12.9
Euroexpansão	Jun 1986	41.0	?	?	?	?	?	?
Tempo	9 Oct 1986	35.6	24.8	9.2	—N/a	9.8	–	10.8
1985 local elections	15 Dec 1985	34.0	27.4	4.7	19.4	9.7	4.8	6.6
1985 legislative election	6 Oct 1985	29.9; 88	20.8; 57	17.9; 45	15.5; 38	10.0; 22	5.9; 0	9.1

== Results ==
=== National summary ===
Party	Votes	%	+/–	Seats	+/–
Social Democratic Party	2,850,784	50.22	+20.35	148	+60
Socialist Party	1,262,506	22.24	+1.47	60	+3
Unitary Democratic Coalition (Note: Portuguese Communist Party (29 MPs) and "The Greens" (2 MPs) ran in coalition.) (Note: In 1985, as United People Alliance.)	689,137	12.14	–3.35	31	–7
Democratic Renewal Party	278,561	4.91	–13.01	7	–38
Democratic and Social Centre	251,987	4.44	–5.52	4	–18
Popular Democratic Union	50,717	0.89	–0.38	0	0
Revolutionary Socialist Party	32,977	0.58	–0.03	0	0
Portuguese Democratic Movement	32,607	0.57	–	0	–
Christian Democratic Party	31,667	0.56	–0.16	0	0
People's Monarchist Party	23,218	0.41	New	0	New
Portuguese Workers' Communist Party	20,800	0.37	+0.03	0	0
Communist Party (Reconstructed)	18,544	0.33	+0.11	0	0
Workers' Party of Socialist Unity	9,185	0.16	–0.17	0	0
Total	5,552,690	100.00	–	250	0
Valid votes	5,552,690	97.82	+0.33		
Invalid votes	73,533	1.30	–0.37		
Blank votes	50,135	0.88	+0.04		
Total votes	5,676,358	100.00	–		
Registered voters/turnout	7,930,668	71.57	–2.59		
Source: Comissão Nacional de Eleições

Vote share
PSD	50.22%
PS	22.24%
CDU	12.14%
PRD	4.91%
CDS	4.44%
UDP	0.89%
PSR	0.58%
MDP	0.57%
PDC	0.56%
Others	1.27%
Blank/Invalid	2.18%

Parliamentary seats
PSD	59.20%
PS	24.00%
CDU	12.40%
PRD	2.80%
CDS	1.60%

=== Distribution by constituency ===
Results of the 1987 election of the Portuguese Assembly of the Republic by constituency
Constituency	%	S	%	S	%	S	%	S	%	S	Total S
Constituency	PSD		PS		CDU		PRD		CDS		Total S
Azores	66.7	4	20.0	1	2.3	-	3.0	-	3.3	-	5
Aveiro	60.4	11	22.9	4	4.4	-	2.7	-	5.3	-	15
Beja	24.5	1	20.3	1	38.7	3	5.7	-	2.0	-	5
Braga	53.4	10	25.9	5	6.1	1	3.3	-	5.9	1	17
Bragança	60.8	3	19.2	1	3.2	-	1.3	-	7.6	-	4
Castelo Branco	52.1	4	22.4	2	7.1	-	6.0	-	4.7	-	6
Coimbra	50.0	6	28.7	4	7.2	1	3.5	-	4.5	-	11
Évora	32.1	2	15.4	-	36.2	2	7.7	-	2.1	-	4
Faro	46.7	5	24.9	3	10.9	1	6.3	-	3.1	-	9
Guarda	60.0	4	21.8	1	3.3	-	2.0	-	6.6	-	5
Leiria	60.8	9	18.7	2	5.9	-	3.0	-	6.0	-	11
Lisbon	45.8	28	21.2	12	16.5	10	6.9	4	3.7	2	56
Madeira	65.5	4	16.2	1	1.9	-	3.3	-	5.2	-	5
Portalegre	37.4	1	25.1	1	20.9	1	6.3	-	3.1	-	3
Porto	50.9	22	26.7	11	9.4	4	4.0	1	4.0	1	39
Santarém	47.9	7	21.7	3	12.6	1	7.3	1	3.6	-	12
Setúbal	32.6	6	17.6	3	32.7	7	8.7	1	1.9	-	17
Viana do Castelo	54.5	5	20.3	1	6.3	-	4.8	-	7.7	-	6
Vila Real	62.5	5	20.3	1	4.1	-	1.4	-	5.0	-	6
Viseu	64.1	8	17.9	2	2.9	-	1.7	-	7.0	-	10
Europe	37.0	1	28.4	1	15.9	-	4.9	-	6.6	-	2
Outside Europe	63.2	2	7.3	-	1.4	-	1.7	-	19.9	-	2
Total	50.2	148	22.2	60	12.1	31	4.9	7	4.4	4	250
Source: Comissão Nacional de Eleições

=== Maps ===
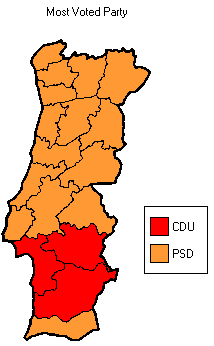
Most voted political force by district (Azores and Madeira not shown).

Winner and seats by constituency.

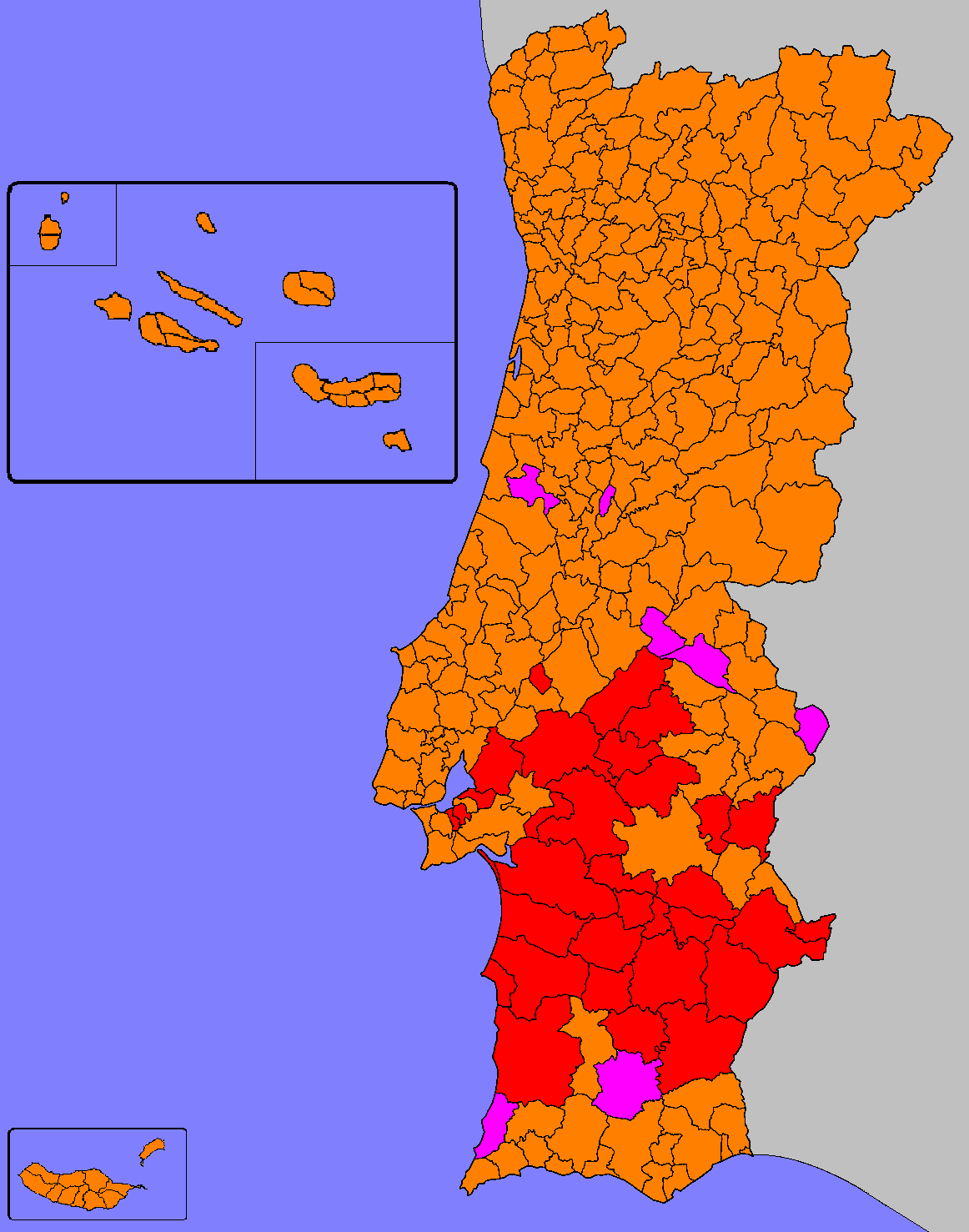
Most voted political force by municipality.

== See also ==
- Politics of Portugal
- List of political parties in Portugal
- Elections in Portugal
