= Christian Democratic Party (Portugal) =

Christian Democratic Party Partido da Democracia Cristã
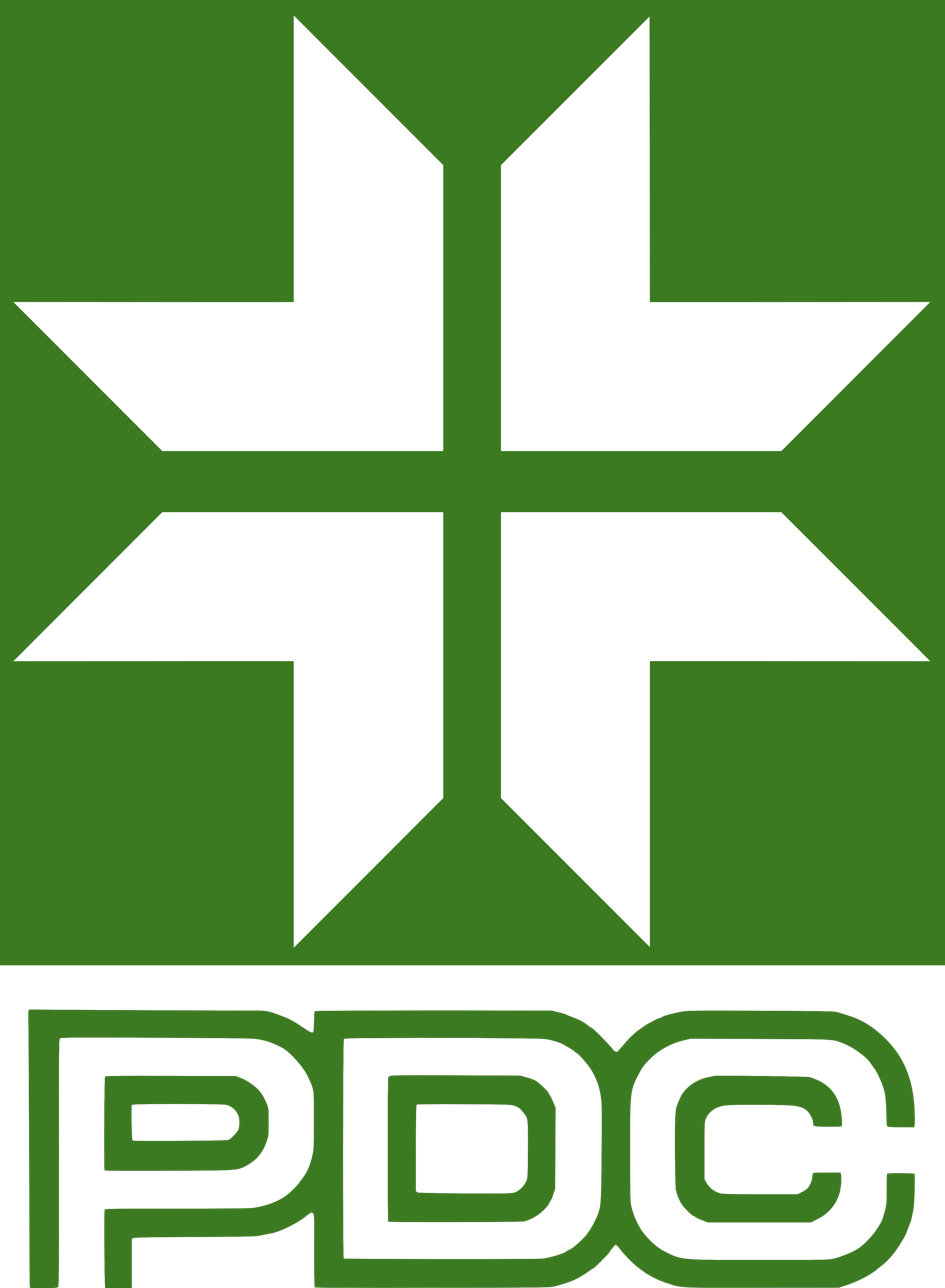
- Leader: Major José Sanches Osório
- Founded: 13 February 1975
- Dissolved: 20 August 2004
- Newspaper: Presença Democrática
- Ideology: National conservatism Christian democracy
- Political position: Right-wing

The Christian Democratic Party (in Portuguese: Partido da Democracia Cristã, PDC) was a political party in Portugal officially founded on 13 February 1975 and extinguished on 20 August 2004. The party never made it to parliament. The weekly publication Presença Democrática (Democratic Presence) was published by the party.

== History ==
After Pope Leo XIII's encyclical Rerum Novarum, Europe saw the emergence of many Christian political parties. The PDC is founded on 10 May 1974, from a schism within the Christian Social-Democratic Party, a party founded on 5 May 1974. The PDC's aim, according its leader Nuno Calvet, was to unite both liberal and conservative Christian democrats, in anti-salazarist tradition. In September 1974, major José Sanches Osório, one of the leading figures of the Carnation Revolution and member of the first provisional government, is invited to become the party's general secretary. The first congress of the party is held on the 1st and 2 February 1975 in Figueira da Foz.

Osório met with the leaders of the European Union of Christian Democrats on 12 February 1975 and gained observer membership status. On the same date, the party submitted 8,500 signatures to the Constitutional Court, aiming to be legally recognized in time to participate in the 1975 legislative election. The party was officially recognized on 13 February 1975. Soon after it became a legal party, the PDC merged with the People's Christian Democratic Party, led by Nuno Calvet Magalhães.

In 1975, CDS and PDC formed a coalition named the Center and Christian Democracy Union (União do Centro e Democracia Cristã). Osório also signed the "MFA/parties agreement", against the will of many of the party's militants, who rejected any agreement with the communist faction of the military.

Osório joined the António de Spínola faction and participated in the 11 of March 1975 failed counter-coup, after which Osório fled to Spain. The party was suspended from participating in the 1975 Portuguese legislative election, due to its "disturbing and undemocratic actions" during the counter-coup. The Center and Christian Democracy Union coalition with CDS was also dissolved. The PDC returns to legality after the coup of 25 November 1975.

During the elections of 1976, PDC ran alone, as CDS refused to form a coalition.

During the spring of 1979, the PDC experienced internal contentions, as Osório competed against Pinheiro de Azevedo for the leadership of the party, but in June 1979, Osório left the PDC for CDS. Indeed, the infighting and the creation of the Democratic Alliance, which did not include the PDC, led 84 of the 137 members to leave the PDC and join CDS. A number of independent right-wing candidates joined PDC for the 1979 Portuguese legislative election, and the party improved its electoral performance.

In 1980, before the 1980 Portuguese legislative election, the party tried to join the Democratic Alliance coalition, but was rejected. It instead joined a coalition with Independent Movement for National Reconciliation and the Frente Nacional (National Front), but failed to achieve its objective of surpassing the 1979 results and winning parliamentary seats. Of the three members of the coalition, PDC was the last one to be extinguished (FN was extinguished in that same year, MIRN in 1984, PDC only in 2004), but without ever achieving electoral significance.

The party became inactive starting with the 1991 legislative elections. The party was extinguished in 2004, after failing to present financial information on three consecutive years (1998-2000).

== Election results ==
=== Assembly of the Republic ===
Election	Assembly of the Republic			Government	Size
Election	Votes	%	Seats won	Government	Size
1976	29,874	0.54%	0 / 263	No seats	9th
1979	72,514	1.21%	0 / 250	No seats	5th
1980 PDC-MIRN-FN coalition	23,819	0.40%	0 / 250	No seats	9th
1983	39,180	0.69%	0 / 250	No seats	5th
1985	41,831	0.72%	0 / 250	No seats	7th
1987	31,667	0.56%	0 / 250	No seats	9th

=== European Parliament ===
Election	European Parliament			Size
Election	Votes	%	Seats won	Size
1987	40,812	0.72%	0 / 24	8th
1989	29,745	0.72%	0 / 24	9th

== See also ==
- Catholic Centre Party
- Citizenship and Christian Democracy
