= Democratic Renewal Party (Portugal) =

Democratic Renewal Party Partido Renovador Democrático
- Founder: Ramalho Eanes
- Founded: 10 July 1985
- Dissolved: 12 April 2000
- Merged into: National Renovator Party
- Ideology: Centrism; Third Way; Social democracy Populism
- Political position: Centre to centre-left
- European Parliament group: European Democratic Alliance (1986–89); Socialist Group (1989–1991); Rainbow Group (1991–1994) (had one MEP, Pedro Canavarro, elected as part of the Socialist Party lists. In 1991 he crossed the floor to join the Rainbow Group)
- Colours: Green

The Democratic Renewal Party (Portuguese: Partido Renovador Democrático, pronounced [pɐɾˈtiðu ʁɨnuvɐˈðoɾ ðɨmuˈkɾatiku], PRD; also Democratic Renovator Party) was a political party in Portugal, founded in 1985 with the political support of the then independent President of the Republic, Ramalho Eanes, and lasting until 2000. At the time of its foundation, it was meant to "moralize Portuguese political life" and the party positioned itself in the political centre. Its first leader was Hermínio Martinho.

== History ==
A short time after its foundation, the PRD profited from the dissolution of the Portuguese parliament, occupied at the time by a grand coalition between the Socialist Party (PS) and the Social Democratic Party (PSD), from both of which the PRD included dissidents (for example, on the PS side, José Medeiros Ferreira, former foreign Minister in a Mário Soares government and also a supporter of the centre-right Democratic Alliance as a dissident of the PS, and on the Social Democratic side, Joaquim Magalhães Mota, a co-founder of the PSD). Due to a disastrous economic policy, Ramalho Eanes dissolved the parliament and called for a new election where the newly founded PRD surprisingly won 18% of the vote and got 45 MPs, becoming the third major party. The election did not give the majority of the seats to any party, so the party with the most votes, the Social Democratic Party, formed a minority government with PRD tactical support, sending the PSD's Socialist former coalition partners into opposition.

In the local elections of 1985, however, the party began to have difficulties, achieving only 5% of the vote and few seats. In the following presidential election in 1986, the party supported Salgado Zenha along with the Portuguese Communist Party, but its candidate did not manage to reach the second round.

In 1987, the party made a decision that would lead to its dissolution, supporting a censure motion, along with the Communists and the Socialists, that led to the fall of the first government of Aníbal Cavaco Silva, which took office after the legislative elections of 1985. In the subsequent legislative election, the party lost most of its support, almost disappearing from parliament, losing 38 of its 45 MPs. Meanwhile, Ramalho Eanes had replaced Hermínio Martinho as leader of the party, a post he too left after the electoral disaster.

In the 1989 European elections, the party made a pact with the Socialist Party and elected one MEP on the Socialist electoral lists, Pedro Canavarro. In the legislative election of 1991, the party, at the time led by Canavarro, lost all of its parliamentary representation and never regained it, nor reached its previous position. Canavarro left the leadership of the party and was replaced by Manuel Vargas Loureiro, who led it until its de facto extinction. In the late 1990s, the weakened and disjointed party was taken over by extreme right-wing elements and the party became the National Renovator Party.

== Election results ==
=== Assembly of the Republic ===
Election	Leader	Votes	%	Seats	+/-	Government
1985	Hermínio Martinho	1,038,893	17.9 (#3)	45 / 250		Confidence and supply
1987	António Ramalho Eanes	278,561	4.9 (#4)	7 / 250	▼38	Opposition
1991	Pedro Canavarro	35,077	0.6 (#8)	0 / 230	▼7	No seats

=== Local elections ===
Election year	# of overall votes	% of overall vote	# of overall councillors won	+/-	# of overall mayors elected	+/-	Notes
1985	224,161	4.7 (#5)	49 / 1,975		3 / 305		
1989	38,565	0.8 (#7)	4 / 1,997	▼45	0 / 305	▼3	
1993	1,456	0.0 (#12)	0 / 2,015	▼4	0 / 305	0	
1997	1,487	0.0 (#17)	0 / 2,021	0	0 / 305	0	

=== European Parliament ===
Election	Leader	Votes	%	Seats	+/-
1987	José Medeiros Ferreira	250,158	4.4 (#5)	1 / 24	
1989	Pedro Canavarro	with PS		1 / 24	0
1994	Manuel Vargas Loureiro	5,941	0.2 (#13)	0 / 25	▼1
