= José Medeiros Ferreira =

Portuguese politician, historian, and political scientist

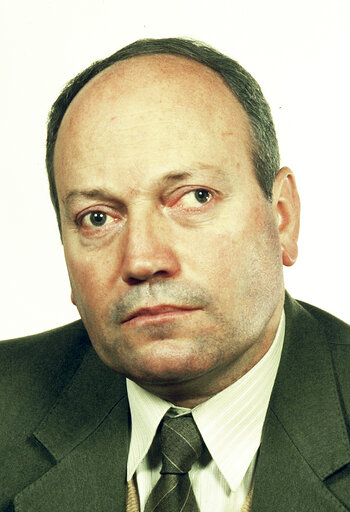
- Official portrait as an MEP, 1987

Minister of Foreign Affairs
- In office 23 July 1976 – 12 October 1977
- Preceded by: Ernesto Melo Antunes
- Succeeded by: Mário Soares

Member of the Assembly of the Republic
- In office 2 June 1975 – 12 November 1980
- Constituency: Lisbon
- In office 4 November 1985 – 1 January 1986
- Constituency: Lisbon
- In office 27 October 1995 – 9 March 2005
- Constituency: Azores

Member of the European Parliament
- In office 1 January 1986 – 24 June 1989

Personal details
- Born: 20 February 1942 Ponta Delgada or Funchal, Portugal
- Died: 18 March 2014 (aged 72) Lisbon, Portugal
- Party: Socialist Party, Democratic Renewal Party, Socialist Party
- Education: University of Geneva
- Occupation: Politician, historian, political scientist
- Awards: Order of Prince Henry (1981), Order of Liberty (1989)

José Manuel de Medeiros Ferreira (20 February 1942 – 18 March 2014) was a Portuguese politician, historian, and political scientist. He served as Minister of International Negotiations from 1976 to 1977 and was a long-time member of the Portuguese parliament. He also served as a Member of the European Parliament for the second term from 1986 to 1989.

== Biography ==
He was born in Ponta Delgada or Funchal, Portugal. He studied history at the University of Lisbon. In the 1960s, he participated in student protests and opposition activities, which led to his expulsion from the university with a ban on studying in Portugal. In 1968, he emigrated to Switzerland. He eventually completed his studies at the University of Geneva in 1972 and obtained a doctorate in political and institutional history from the Universidade Nova de Lisboa in 1991. From 1972 to 1974, he taught at the University of Geneva and later became a professor at the Universidade Nova de Lisboa, specializing in contemporary history and international relations. He also taught at the University of the Azores. He authored scientific publications and other books and appeared as a television commentator.

He became involved in the activities of the Socialist Party. He was elected to the Constitutional Assembly in 1975, 1976, and 1979, and subsequently to the Assembly of the Republic for several terms. From September 1975 to July 1976, he served as Secretary of State for Foreign Affairs in the government of Jose Batista Pinheiro de Azevedo, and then as Minister of International Negotiations in the first government of Mario Soares, leaving office after a conflict with the Prime Minister. In 1979, he belonged to the right-wing faction of the PS called Reformadores, dissolved in 1985. In the same year, he joined the Democratic Renewal Party and returned to the Assembly of the Republic for its fourth term.

From January 1986 to September 1987, he served as a Member of the European Parliament. He was re-elected in the general elections in 1987 as the only representative of PRD, but soon left the party. From January 1986 to November 1987, he was vice-president of the European Democratic Alliance, then joined the Socialist faction. He later rejoined the Socialist Party and served in the parliament from 1995 to 2005. Additionally, from 1996 to 2005, he was a member of the Parliamentary Assembly of the Council of Europe. In 2006, he stepped down from leadership positions in the Socialist Party.

== Personal life ==
He was married to Maria Emília Brederode Santos since 1973, the daughter of politician Nuno Rodrigues dos Santos, with whom he had a son. In 1980, he participated in a meeting of the Bilderberg Group.

== Awards ==
He was awarded the Grand Cross of the Order of Prince Henry in 1981 and the Grand Cross of the Order of Liberty in 1989.
