= Central Bloc =

Central Bloc (Portuguese: Bloco Central) is the name given in Portugal to the grand coalition of the Socialist Party and the Social Democratic Party which ruled from 1983 to 1985, and to any potential coalition between those two parties.
