= Francisco Lucas Pires =

Portuguese politician (1944–1998)

Francisco Lucas Pires GCC
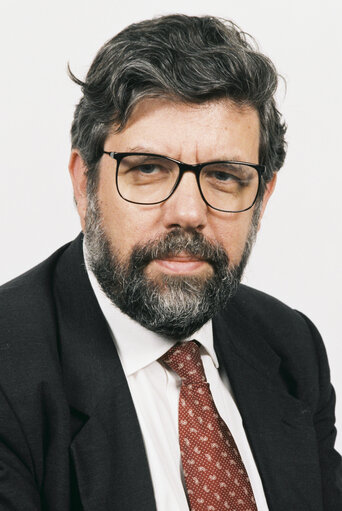
- Official portrait as an MEP, 1989

President of the Democratic and Social Centre
- In office 20 February 1983 – 13 April 1986
- Preceded by: Diogo Freitas do Amaral
- Succeeded by: Adriano Moreira

Ministry of Culture and Scientific Coordination
- In office 4 September 1981 – 9 June 1983
- Prime Minister: Francisco Pinto Balsemão
- Preceded by: Office established
- Succeeded by: António Coimbra Martins

Member of the Assembly of the Republic
- In office 25 April 1976 – 13 April 1986
- Constituency: Porto (1976–1979); Coimbra (1979–1983); Lisbon (1983–1986)

Member of the European Parliament
- In office 19 June 1987 – 22 May 1998
- Constituency: Portugal

Personal details
- Born: Francisco António Lucas Pires; 19 October 1944 Coimbra, Portugal
- Died: 22 May 1998 (aged 53) Pombal, Portugal
- Party: CDS (1976–1991); PSD (1997–1998)
- Spouse: Teresa Almeida Garrett
- Children: 4
- Education: University of Coimbra
- Occupation: Lawyer • Professor • Politician

Francisco António Lucas Pires GCC (19 October 1944 – 22 May 1998) was a Portuguese professor, lawyer, and politician.

== Biography ==
Pires was married to Maria Teresa Bahia de Almeida Garrett, and was the father of four children.

He graduated from law school at the University of Coimbra in 1966 and then began complementary course on political science and economics, which he completed in 1968. He completed his PhD in legal and political science in 1989 before starting an academic career as a professor at the Faculty of Law of Coimbra.

== Politics ==
Pires joined the CDS in 1974 and became a deputy to the Assembly of the Republic. He served as the Minister of Culture and Scientific Coordination in the VIII Constitutional Government. He was a member of the Council of State from 1983 to 1985.

Between February 1983 and October 1985 Pires led Partido Popular, having left the presidency due to the poor results in the parliamentary elections in October 1985. Pires was elected to the European Parliament in 1987. In the following elections to the European Parliament, Pires joined the ranks of the CDS. He was the first Portuguese Vice-President of the European Parliament from 1987 to 1988 (and again in 1998), and was the first vice president of the European Christian Democratic Foundation for Cooperation. Pires formally joined the PSD in 1997.

== Selected works ==
Title	Date
The Problem of the Constitution	1970
Sovereignty and Autonomy	1974
A Constitution for Portugal	1975
In the European Time	1986
Constitution Theory 1976: the Dualistic Transition	1988
Treaties establishing the Community and the European Union	1994
The New Rights of Portuguese	1994
What is Europe	1994
Portugal and the Future of the European Union	1995
Regionalisation and Europe	1996
Schengen and the Community of Portuguese Language Countries	1997
Introduction to the European Constitutional Law	1997

== Death ==
Pires died of a heart attack on 22 May 1998 while traveling from Lisbon to Coimbra.
