= 1983 Portuguese legislative election =

- 25 April 1983

All 250 seats in the Assembly of the Republic 126 seats needed for a majority
- Registered: 7,337,064 ▲2.2%
- Turnout: 5,707,695 (77.8%) ▼6.1 pp
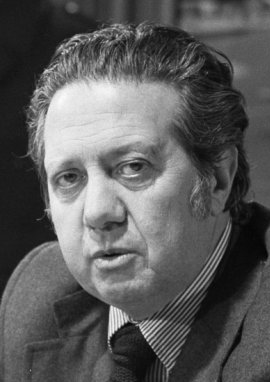

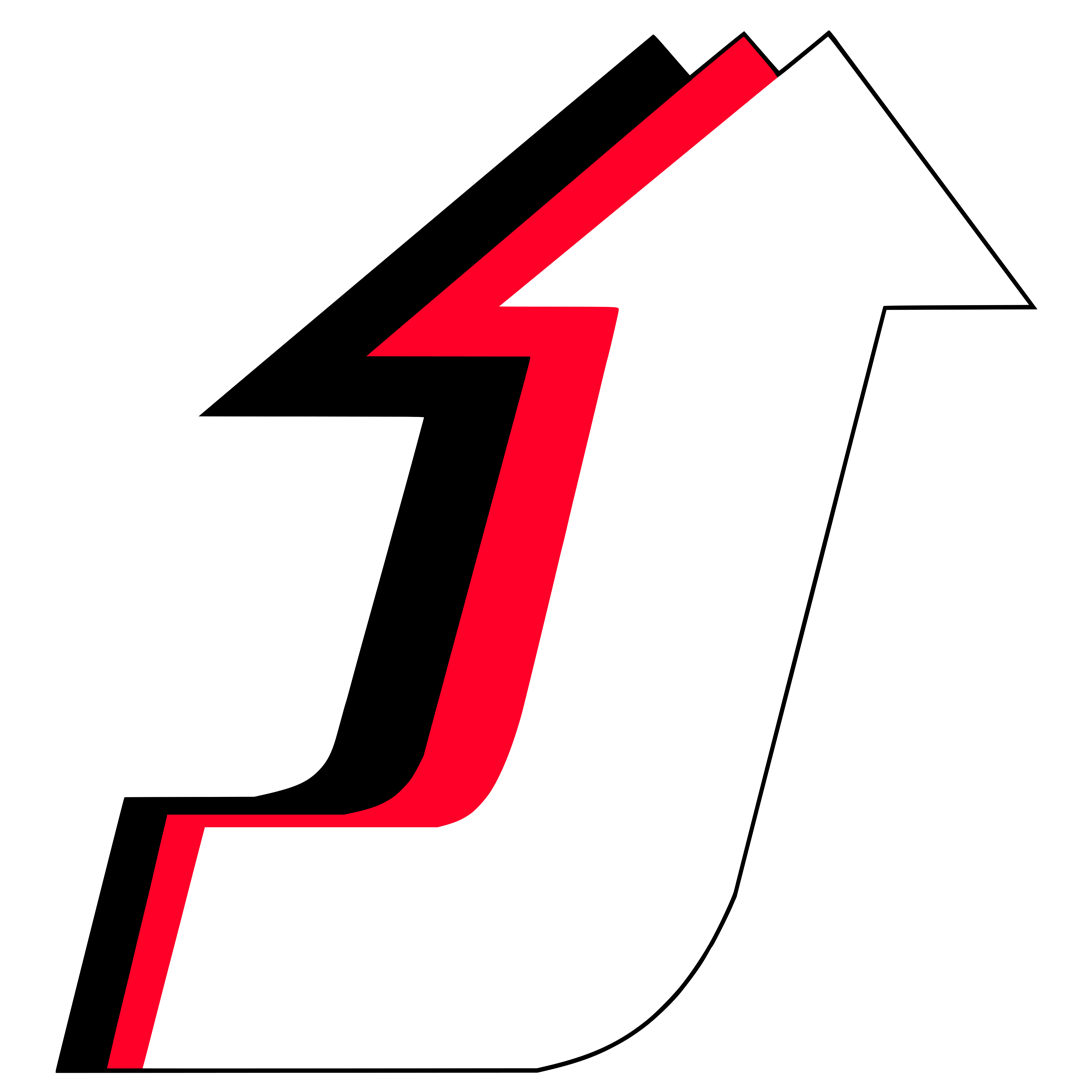

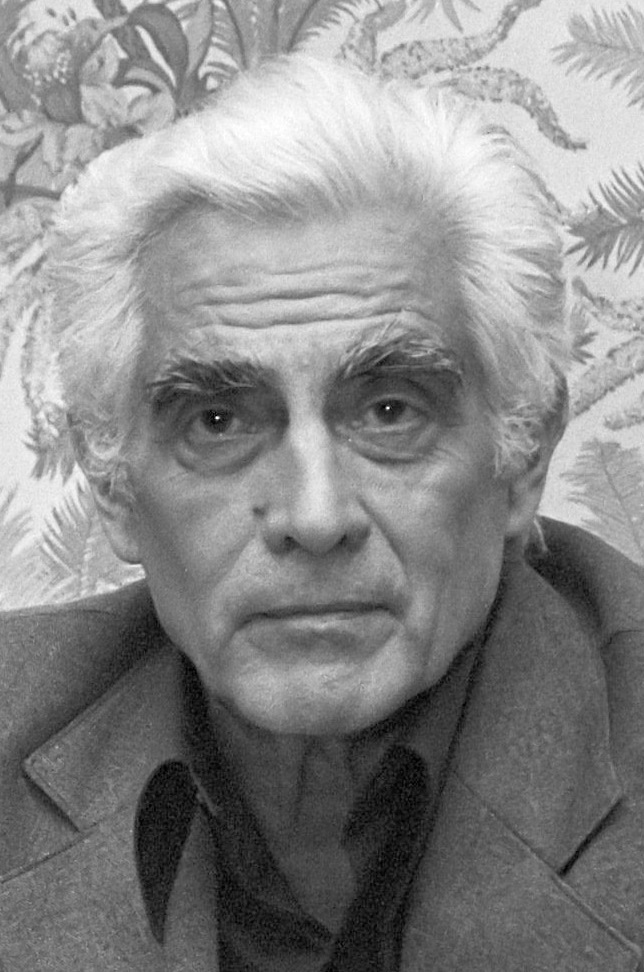

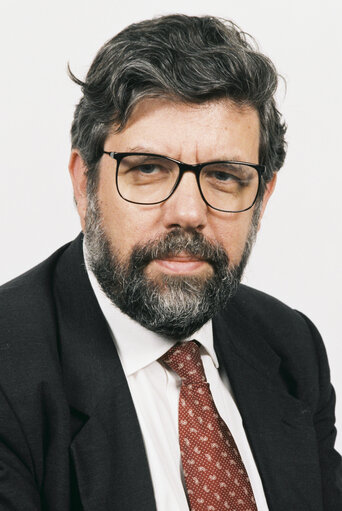
	First party	Second party
Leader	Mário Soares	Carlos Mota Pinto
Party	PS	PSD
Leader since	19 April 1973	27 February 1983 (designated candidate)
Leader's seat	Lisbon	Coimbra
Last election	66 seats, 27.8% (Note: The Socialist Party (PS), the Left-wing Union for the Socialist Democracy (UEDS) and the Independent Social-Democratic Action (ASDI) contested the 1980 election in a coalition called Republican and Socialist Front (FRS) and won a combined 27.8% of the vote and elected 74 MPs to parliament.)	82 seats (AD)
Seats won	101	75
Seat change	▲35	▼7
Popular vote	2,061,309	1,554,804
Percentage	36.1%	27.2%
Swing	▲8.3 pp	(Note: The Social Democratic Party (PSD), the Democratic Social Center (CDS) and the People's Monarchist Party (PPM) contested the 1980 election in a coalition called Democratic Alliance (AD) and won a combined 47.6% of the vote and elected 134 MPs to parliament.)
	Third party	Fourth party
Leader	Álvaro Cunhal	Francisco Lucas Pires
Party	PCP	CDS
Alliance	APU
Leader since	14 April 1978	20 February 1983
Leader's seat	Lisbon	Lisbon
Last election	41 seats, 16.8%	46 seats (AD)
Seats won	44	30
Seat change	▲3	▼16
Popular vote	1,031,609	716,705
Percentage	18.1%	12.6%
Swing	▲1.3 pp
Prime Minister before election
Francisco Pinto Balsemão
PSD
Prime Minister after election
Mário Soares
PS

The 1983 Portuguese legislative election took place on 25 April. The election renewed all 250 members of the Assembly of the Republic.

The election was called after two and a half years of significant instability, from the dead of Francisco Sá Carneiro in an aircrash in December 1980, to deep internal divisions within the Democratic Alliance (AD) under the leadership of Francisco Pinto Balsemão.

The Socialist Party (PS) emerged victorious with 36 percent, and Mário Soares was nominated Prime Minister. However, the Socialists lacked a majority in the Assembly of the Republic and were forced to form a coalition with the Social Democrats, which achieved 27 percent, in what was called the "Central Bloc". Although this coalition allowed Soares to govern, several members of both parties were against it, and internal attacks led to the collapse of the coalition after less than two years.

Besides the two main parties, the Communist-dominated United People Alliance (APU) gained 3 MPs and 18 percent of the votes, while the Democratic and Social Center (CDS), after the dissolution of the Democratic Alliance, garnered 30 MPs, a loss of 16, and 12 percent of the votes. On the other hand, the Popular Democratic Union (UDP) lost its sole seat that it had since 1975.

This would the last legislative election to be won by the Socialist Party until 1995.

== Background ==
In October 1980, the Democratic Alliance (AD), led by Francisco Sá Carneiro, was reelected with a reinforced majority, but it was cut short with his death, his partner Snu Abecassis, his Defense minister Adelino Amaro da Costa and wife, plus other crew members, in a tragic plane crash in Camarate, Loures, shortly after taking off from Lisbon Airport. This tragic air crash sparked a series of conspirancy theories, mainly because of Portugal's involvement in the Iran–Iraq War and the supply of weapons to both Iraq and Iran.

Following the death of Sá Carneiro, Diogo Freitas do Amaral, CDS leader, became interim Prime Minister until the election of a new PSD leader. Days later, Francisco Pinto Balsemão was elected PSD leader and sworn in as Prime Minister. During Balsemão's term in office, a significant revision of the Constitution in 1982, approved by the AD and the Socialists (PS), dissolved the Revolutionary Council, created the Constitutional Court (thus putting an end to military dominance over elected civilian power), removed some of the left-leaning ideological tone from the supreme law, and aimed to reduce the powers of the President of the Republic. At the same time, Balsemão's government faced a deterioration in the country's economic conditions, resulting from the adverse external situation, but mostly from the expansionary fiscal policies during the early days of the AD government, which severely damaged public finances.

=== Government fall ===
Pinto Balsemão had a lot of problems in leading the government, as he lacked support from many senior members of his party, such as Aníbal Cavaco Silva, former Finance minister under Sá Carneiro, and several of his cabinet ministers kept resigning, like Marcelo Rebelo de Sousa, not to mention the very tense and fraught relationship with President Ramalho Eanes. Moreover, the right-wing policies were criticized by the left-wing and by trade unions, culminating in the General Confederation of the Portuguese Workers, with the support of the Communists, calling a general strike in February 1982 that shook the government. The wave of resignations among Balsemão's ministers continued and by the end of 1982, and also influenced by the AD's weak results in the 1982 local elections, Balsemão himself also resigned.

The Social Democratic Party proposed, to President Ramalho Eanes, a government led by Vítor Crespo, and despite this name being narrowly approved by the Council of State, President Eanes rejected the proposal citing that the political conditions were just too deteriorated, and instead decided to dissolve Parliament and call an election for April. Shortly after, the AD was dissolved as PSD, CDS and PPM decided to contest by their own the April snap election.

=== Leadership changes and challenges ===
==== Social Democratic Party ====
On 13 December 1980, just a few days after Sá Carneiro's death, the PSD national party council elected Francisco Pinto Balsemão as party leader and nominated him to became Prime Minister. Balsemão was sworn in as Prime Minister on 9 January 1981.

Ballot: 13 December 1980
Candidate	Votes	%
Francisco Pinto Balsemão	59	96.7
Against	1	1.6
Blank/Invalid ballots	1	1.6
Turnout	61	
Source: Público

In early 1983, after the collapse of the AD coalition, the then PSD leader Francisco Pinto Balsemão announced he would not run again for the leadership of the party nor be the party's candidate for the early legislative election. Carlos Mota Pinto, former Prime Minister, supported Nuno Rodrigues dos Santos' candidacy for President of the party, in order for him to be the party's candidate for Prime Minister, while Pinto Balsemão's wing supported João Bosco Mota Amaral, President of the Regional Government of the Azores, who ended up dropping out. In a deeply divided Congress, Nuno Rodrigues dos Santos won the presidency, while Mota Pinto was selected by the PSD as the party's candidate for Prime Minister.

Ballot: 27 February 1983
Candidate	Votes	%
Nuno Rodrigues dos Santos	596	73.3
João Bosco Mota Amaral	withdrew	
Against	118	14.5
Blank/Invalid ballots	99	12.2
Turnout	813	
Source: Diário de Lisboa

==== Democratic and Social Center ====
Just like in the PSD, after the dissolution of the Democratic Alliance (AD), Diogo Freitas do Amaral also resigned from his party's leadership, and a snap congress to elect a new leader was called. Two candidates were on the ballot, Francisco Lucas Pires and Luís Barbosa, with Lucas Pires being elected as new party leader.

Ballot: 20 February 1983
Candidate	Votes	%
Francisco Lucas Pires		58.2
Luís Barbosa		41.8
Turnout		
Source: Diário de Lisboa

== Electoral system ==
The Assembly of the Republic has 250 members elected to four-year terms. Governments do not require absolute majority support of the Assembly to hold office, as even if the number of opposers of government is larger than that of the supporters, the number of opposers still needs to be equal or greater than 126 (absolute majority) for both the Government's Programme to be rejected or for a motion of no confidence to be approved.

The number of seats assigned to each district depends on the district magnitude. The use of the d'Hondt method makes for a higher effective threshold than certain other allocation methods such as the Hare quota or Sainte-Laguë method, which are more generous to small parties.

For these elections, and compared with the 1980 elections, the MPs distributed by districts were the following:

District	Number of MPs	Map
Lisbon	56	
Porto	38	
Setúbal	17	
Braga^{(+1)}	16	
Aveiro	15	
Santarém	12	
Leiria and Coimbra^{(–1)}	11	
Viseu	10	
Faro	9	
Castelo Branco, Viana do Castelo and Vila Real	6	
Azores, Beja, Évora, Guarda and Madeira	5	
Bragança and Portalegre	4	
Europe and Outside Europe	2	

== Parties ==
The table below lists the parties represented in the Assembly of the Republic during the 2nd legislature (1980–1983) and that also contested the elections:

Name		Ideology	Political position	Leader	1980 result	
Name		Ideology	Political position	Leader	%	Seats
PPD/PSD	Social Democratic Party; Partido Social Democrata	Liberal conservatism	Centre-right	Carlos Mota Pinto	47.6%	82 / 250
CDS	Democratic and Social Center; Centro Democrático e Social	Christian democracy	Centre-right to right-wing	Francisco Lucas Pires	47.6%	46 / 250
PPM	People's Monarchist Party; Partido Popular Monárquico	Monarchism; Green conservatism	Right-wing	Gonçalo Ribeiro Telles	47.6%	6 / 250
PS	Socialist Party; Partido Socialista	Social democracy	Centre-left	Mário Soares	27.8%	66 / 250
UEDS	Left-wing Union for the Socialist Democracy; União da Esquerda para a Democracia Socialista	Democratic Socialism; Workers' self-management	Left-wing	António Lopes Cardoso	27.8%	4 / 250
ASDI	Independent Social-Democratic Action; Acção Social Democrata Independente	Democratic Socialism; Social democracy	Centre-left	António de Sousa Franco	27.8%	4 / 250
PCP	Portuguese Communist Party; Partido Comunista Português	Communism; Marxism–Leninism	Far-left	Álvaro Cunhal	16.8% (Note: The Portuguese Communist Party (41 MPs) and Portuguese Democratic Movement (3 MPs) ran in coalition.)	39 / 250
MDP/CDE	Portuguese Democratic Movement; Movimento Democrático Português	Left-wing nationalism Democratic socialism	Left-wing	José Manuel Tengarrinha	16.8%	2 / 250
UDP	Popular Democratic Union; União Democrática Popular	Marxism; Socialism	Left-wing	Mário Tomé	1.4%	1 / 250

== Campaign period ==
=== Issues ===
The country's very difficult economic situation, with the need for austerity measures, dominated the campaign. The campaign itself was rather low-key, sign of the country's problematic economic situation and a gloomy electorate. The Socialist Party (PS), under the leadership of Mário Soares, envisioned a comeback, with Soares pointing to the need for a "clear majority" due to the country's bad shape, while the Social Democrats (PSD), led by a new leader, Carlos Mota Pinto, warned of the dangers of instability. Álvaro Cunhal's communist APU coalition ran under the motto of "defeating the reactionary parties", whereas the Democratic Social Center (CDS) campaigned on the basis of national liberalism.

=== Party slogans ===
Party or alliance	Original slogan	English translation	Refs
PSD	« Firmeza na decisão. Competência na acção. »	"Firmness in the decision. Competence in action."	
PS	« Juntos vamos conseguir »	"Together we will do it"	
CDS	« O nosso caminho é Portugal »	"Our path is Portugal"	
APU	« Vota APU, A solução! »	"Vote APU, The Solution!"	

=== Candidates' debates ===
1983 Portuguese legislative election debates
Date	Organisers	Moderator(s)	P Present A Absent invitee N Non-invitee				
Date	Organisers	Moderator(s)	PSD Pinto	PS Soares	CDS Pires	APU Cunhal	Refs
23 Mar	Antena 1		P	P	P	P	
31 Mar	RTP1		P	P	P	P	

== Opinion polling ==
Exit poll / Forecast

Polling firm/Link	Date Released	PSD	CDS	PS	APU	O	Lead
1983 legislative election	25 Apr 1983	27.2; 75	12.6; 30	36.1; 101	18.1; 44	6.0; 0	8.9
RTP (23:15)	25 Apr 1983	25.4– 27.7; 69/72	11.5– 12.0; 27/30	36.0– 39.1; 98/104	17.2– 18.5; 42/46	–	10.6; 11.4
RTP (20:30)	25 Apr 1983	22.0– 25.5; 65/72	12.0– 14.5; 35/40	36.0– 38.5; 94/102	16.5– 19.0; 42/46	–	13.0; 14.0
Tempo	Apr 1983	24	12.5	38	17	8.5	14
Euroexpansão	29 Jan 1983	24	12	33	19	12	9
1982 local elections	12 Dec 1982	42.5		31.8	20.7	5.0	10.7
Euroexpansão	Sep 1982	22	19	28	18	13	6
Antropos (Note: AD coalition poll - Results presented here exclude undecideds (10.4%), abstention (2.6%) and doesn't answer (6.6%). With their inclusion results are: AD: 33.8%; PS: 29.0%; APU: 11.2%; Others/Invalid: 6.4%. PSD and CDS separate lists poll - Results presented here exclude undecideds (10.4%), abstention (2.2%) and doesn't answer (6.2%). With their inclusion results are: PS: 34.4%; PSD: 20.4%; APU: 11.4%; CDS: 8.0%; Others/Invalid: 7.0%.)	27 Jul 1981	42.0		36.1	13.9	8.0	5.9
Antropos	27 Jul 1981	25.1	9.9	42.4	14.0	8.6	17.3
1980 legislative election	5 Oct 1980	47.6; 134		27.8; 74	16.8; 41	7.8; 1	19.8

== Results ==
=== National summary ===
Party	Votes	%	+/–	Seats	+/–
Socialist Party (Note: The Socialist Party (PS) results are compared to the combined total share of the vote from the Republican and Socialist Front and from the 66 seats elected by the PS, within the coalition, in the 1980 election.)	2,061,309	36.11	+8.34	101	+35
Social Democratic Party	1,554,804	27.24	—	75	–7
United People Alliance	1,031,609	18.07	+1.32	44	+3
Democratic and Social Centre	716,705	12.56	—	30	–16
Christian Democratic Party	39,180	0.69	+0.29	0	0
People's Monarchist Party	27,635	0.48	—	0	–6
Popular Democratic Union	27,260	0.48	–0.90	0	–1
Popular Democratic Union–Revolutionary Socialist Party	25,222	0.44	—	0	—
Portuguese Workers' Communist Party	20,995	0.37	–0.22	0	0
Workers' Party of Socialist Unity	19,657	0.34	–1.04	0	0
Revolutionary Socialist Party	13,327	0.23	–0.73	0	0
Socialist Workers League	11,500	0.20	New	0	New
Portuguese Marxist–Leninist Communist Organization	6,113	0.11	+0.05	0	0
Democratic Party of the Atlantic	5,523	0.10	–0.04	0	0
Communist Party (Reconstructed) (Note: The Communist Party (Reconstructed) list only in Europe and Rest of the World.)	86	0.00	New	0	New
Total	5,560,925	100.00	–	250	0
Valid votes	5,560,925	97.43	–0.29		
Invalid votes	104,276	1.83	+0.12		
Blank votes	42,494	0.74	+0.17		
Total votes	5,707,695	100.00	–		
Registered voters/turnout	7,337,064	77.79	–6.15		
Source: Comissão Nacional de Eleições

Vote share
PS	36.11%
PSD	27.24%
APU	18.07%
CDS	12.56%
PDC	0.69%
Others	2.75%
Blank/Invalid	2.57%

Parliamentary seats
PS	40.40%
PSD	30.00%
APU	17.60%
CDS	12.00%

=== Distribution by constituency ===
Results of the 1983 election of the Portuguese Assembly of the Republic by constituency
Constituency	%	S	%	S	%	S	%	S	Total S
Constituency	PS		PSD		APU		CDS		Total S
Azores	31.1	2	54.4	3	3.1	-	4.7	-	5
Aveiro	36.6	6	34.8	6	7.0	1	16.4	2	15
Beja	28.0	2	11.8	-	49.4	3	4.1	-	5
Braga	39.7	7	27.0	5	8.8	1	18.3	3	16
Bragança	30.4	1	35.8	2	4.8	-	20.9	1	4
Castelo Branco	37.1	3	30.6	2	11.3	-	13.2	1	6
Coimbra	45.3	6	27.8	3	10.7	1	10.2	1	11
Évora	23.9	1	18.6	1	47.6	3	4.5	-	5
Faro	43.2	5	23.1	2	18.6	2	7.4	-	9
Guarda	33.5	2	31.5	2	4.9	-	23.8	1	5
Leiria	32.7	4	35.6	4	9.5	1	16.2	2	11
Lisbon	35.8	21	21.8	13	25.3	15	11.7	7	56
Madeira	24.4	1	56.2	4	2.8	-	8.2	-	5
Portalegre	38.5	2	19.1	1	28.7	1	7.5	-	4
Porto	43.0	18	26.2	10	13.6	5	12.5	5	38
Santarém	38.4	5	24.7	3	20.0	3	10.0	1	12
Setúbal	30.6	6	12.7	2	45.8	8	5.1	1	17
Viana do Castelo	32.5	2	32.6	3	9.9	-	18.4	1	6
Vila Real	32.3	2	42.0	3	5.4	-	12.7	1	6
Viseu	30.9	4	36.6	4	4.6	-	20.7	2	10
Europe	33.6	1	31.2	1	17.1	-	11.1	-	2
Outside Europe	7.0	-	48.2	1	2.8	-	34.1	1	2
Total	36.1	101	27.2	75	18.1	44	12.6	30	250
Source: Comissão Nacional de Eleições

=== Maps ===
Winner and seats by constituency.

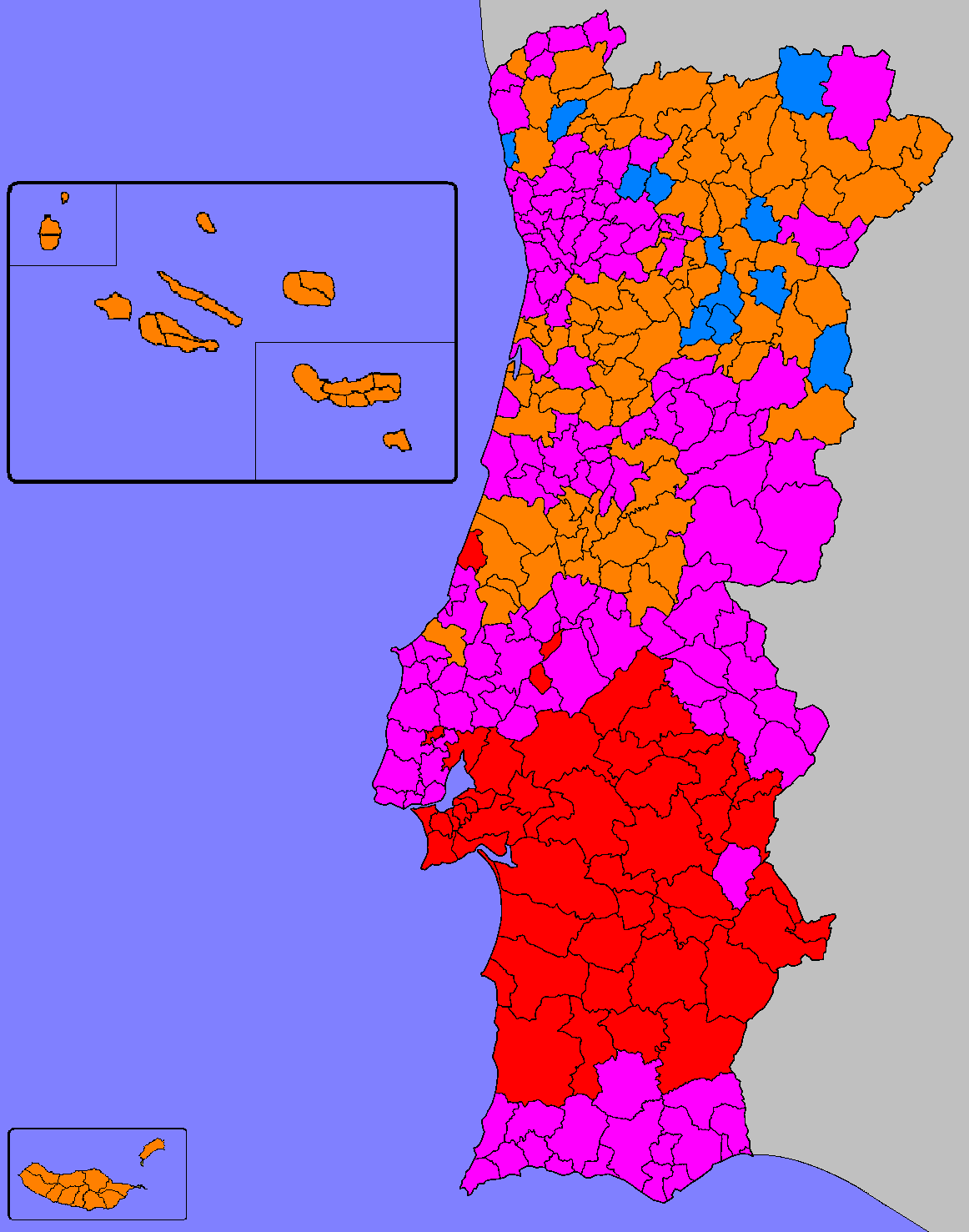
Most voted political force by municipality.

== Aftermath ==
=== Fall of the government ===
The Central Bloc government had become deeply unpopular by 1984, with the consequences of the International Monetary Fund (IMF) bailout to save public finances and the economy hitting hard on the population. The budget cuts and increasing poverty were creating deep disagreements between PS and PSD, but also within both parties rifts were being formed, in addition to conflicting strategies for the 1986 presidential election. In the Social Democrats, these rifts came to a breaking point in February 1985 with party leader Carlos Mota Pinto resigning and announcing he would contest the next leadership ballot. But, Mota Pinto died unexpectedly just days prior to the party’s May congress and Aníbal Cavaco Silva, which was against the Central Bloc, was elected as leader. Shortly after his election as party leader, Cavaco Silva withdrew the PSD support to the Central Bloc, and the government fell with Soares announcing his resignation as prime minister on 13 June 1985, one day after he signed Portugal's entry into the European Economic Community. President Ramalho Eanes decided to dissolve Parliament and call a snap election for 6 October 1985.

== See also ==
- Politics of Portugal
- List of political parties in Portugal
- Elections in Portugal
