= Elections in Portugal =

Elections in Portugal are free, fair, and regularly held, in accordance with election law.

Only the elections since the Carnation Revolution of 1974 are listed here. During the period encompassing the Constitutional Monarchy and the First Republic there were also elections, but only for a limited universe of voters. During the Estado Novo regime, from 1926 to 1974, the few elections held were not up to the democratic standards of their time and never resulted in power transfer.

Portugal elects on a national level the President and the national Parliament, the Assembly of the Republic. The President is elected for a five-year term by the people while the Parliament has 230 members, elected for a four-year term by proportional representation in multi-seat constituencies, the districts. Also on a national level, Portugal elects 21 members of the European Parliament.

The Autonomous Regions of Azores and Madeira elect their own regional government for a four-year term, usually on the same day. The first regional elections were held in 1976.

On a local level, 308 Municipal Chambers and Municipal Assemblies and 3,259 Parish Assemblies are elected for a four-year term in separate elections that usually occur on the same day.

== Legislative elections ==
=== Electoral system ===
The Assembly of the Republic has 230 members elected to four-year terms. Governments do not require absolute majority support of the Assembly to hold office, as even if the number of opposers of government is larger than that of the supporters, the number of opposers still needs to be equal or greater than 116 (absolute majority) for both the Government's Programme to be rejected or for a motion of no confidence to be approved.

The number of seats assigned to each district depends on the district magnitude. The use of the d'Hondt method makes for a higher effective threshold than certain other allocation methods such as the Hare quota or Sainte-Laguë method, which are more generous to small parties.

For the 2025 legislative elections, the MPs were distributed by districts as follows:

District	Number of MPs	Map
Lisbon	48	
Porto	40	
Braga and Setúbal	19	
Aveiro	16	
Leiria	10	
Coimbra, Faro and Santarém	9	
Viseu	8	
Madeira	6	
Azores, Viana do Castelo and Vila Real	5	
Castelo Branco	4	
Beja, Bragança, Évora and Guarda	3	
Portalegre, Europe and Outside Europe	2	

=== Election results 1975–2025 ===
Parties are listed from left-wing to right-wing.

Summary of Portuguese elections for the Assembly of the Republic, 1975–2025
Election	UDP	BE	MDP	PCP	PEV	L	PS	PAN	JPP	PRD	PSD	CDS	PPM	ADIM	PSN	IL	CH	O/I	Turnout
1975*	0.8		4.1	12.5			37.9				26.4	7.6	0.6	0.0				10.1	91.7
1976	1.7			14.4			34.9				24.4	16.0	0.5					8.1	83.5
1979 (Note: In the 1979 and 1980 elections, the Social Democratic Party (PSD), the Democratic Social Center (CDS) and the People's Monarchist Party (PPM) ran in a joint coalition called Democratic Alliance (AD). In the Madeira and Azores islands, however, the parties ran in separate lists but are added in total sum of the coalition.) (Note: In the 1979 and 1980 elections, the Communist Party (PCP) and the Portuguese Democratic Movement (MDP) ran in a joint coalition called United People Alliance (APU).)	2.2		18.8				27.3				45.3							6.2	82.9
1980 (Note: In the 1980 election, the Socialist Party (PS), the Leftwing Union for the Socialist Democracy (UEDS) and the Independent Social Democratic Action (ASDI) ran in a joint coalition called Republican and Socialist Front (FRS). In the Madeira and Azores islands, plus the foreign electoral constituencies, however, the parties ran in separate lists but are added in total sum of the coalition.)	1.4		16.8				27.8				47.6							6.4	83.9
1983 (Note: In the 1983 and 1985 elections, the Communist Party (PCP), Portuguese Democratic Movement (MDP) and the Ecologist Party "The Greens" (PEV) ran in a joint coalition called United People Alliance (APU).)	0.5		18.1				36.1				27.2	12.6	0.5					5.0	77.8
1985	1.3		15.5				20.8			17.9	29.9	10.0						4.6	74.2
1987 (Note: After the 1987 elections, and still today, the Communist Party (PCP) and the Ecologist Party "The Greens" (PEV) run in a joint coalition called Unitary Democratic Coalition (CDU).)	0.9		0.6	12.1			22.2			4.9	50.2	4.4	0.4					4.3	71.6
1991	0.1			8.8			29.1			0.6	50.6	4.4	0.4		1.7			4.3	67.8
1995	0.6			8.6			43.8				34.1	9.1	0.1		0.2			3.5	66.3
1999		2.4		9.0			44.1				32.3	8.3	0.3		0.2			3.4	61.1
2002		2.7		6.9			37.8				40.2	8.7	0.2		0.0			3.5	61.5
2005		6.4		7.5			45.0				28.8	7.2						5.1	64.3
2009		9.8		7.9			36.6				29.1	10.4	0.3					5.9	59.7
2011		5.2		7.9			28.0	1.0			38.7	11.7	0.3					7.2	58.0
2015 (Note: The Social Democratic Party (PSD) and the People's Party (CDS–PP) contested the 2015 election in a coalition called Portugal Ahead (PàF) and won a combined 38.6% of the vote and elected 107 MP's to parliament.)		10.2		8.3		0.7	32.3	1.4	0.3		38.6		0.3					8.2	55.8
2019		9.5		6.3		1.1	36.3	3.3	0.2		27.8	4.2	0.2			1.3	1.3	8.7	48.6
2022		4.4		4.3		1.3	41.4	1.6	0.2		29.1	1.6	0.0			4.9	7.2	4.2	51.5
2024 (Note: In the 2024 election, the Social Democratic Party (PSD), the People's Party (CDS–PP) and the People's Monarchist Party (PPM) ran in a joint coalition called Democratic Alliance (AD). In Madeira, the PSD and CDS–PP ran in a coalition without PPM, but the results are added in total sum of the coalition.)		4.4		3.2		3.2	28.0	1.9	0.3		28.8					4.9	18.1	7.5	59.9
2025 (Note: In the 2025 election, the Social Democratic Party (PSD) and the People's Party (CDS–PP) ran in a joint coalition called AD – PSD/CDS Coalition. In Azores, the PSD and CDS–PP ran in a coalition with PPM, but the results are added in total sum of the coalition.)		2.0		2.9		4.1	22.8	1.4	0.3		31.8		0.1			5.4	22.8	6.4	58.3
*The 1975 election was for the Constituent Assembly.
Source: Comissão Nacional de Eleições

=== Latest election ===
==== 2025 legislative election ====
Party or alliance		Votes	%	+/–	Seats	+/–
AD – PSD/CDS Coalition	AD – PSD/CDS Coalition (Note: Compared with the 2024 Democratic Alliance (PSD/CDS/PPM))	1,971,602	31.20	+3.02	88	+10
AD – PSD/CDS Coalition	Coalition PSD/CDS/PPM (Note: Only in Azores.)	36,886	0.58	–0.07	3	+1
AD – PSD/CDS Coalition	Total	2,008,488	31.78	+2.95	91	+11
Socialist Party		1,442,546	22.83	–5.15	58	–20
Chega		1,438,554	22.76	+4.73	60	+10
Liberal Initiative		338,974	5.36	+0.42	9	+1
LIVRE		257,291	4.07	+0.91	6	+2
Unitary Democratic Coalition		183,686	2.91	–0.26	3	–1
Left Bloc		125,808	1.99	–2.37	1	–4
People Animals Nature		86,930	1.38	–0.57	1	0
National Democratic Alternative		81,660	1.29	–0.29	0	0
Together for the People		20,900	0.33	+0.03	1	+1
React, Include, Recycle		14,021	0.22	–0.18	0	0
Volt Portugal		12,150	0.19	+0.01	0	0
Portuguese Workers' Communist Party		11,896	0.19	–0.05	0	0
Nova Direita		10,216	0.16	–0.09	0	0
Ergue-te		9,046	0.14	+0.05	0	0
Liberal Social Party		7,332	0.12	New	0	New
People's Monarchist Party		5,616	0.09	+0.08	0	0
We, the Citizens!		3,304	0.05	+0.01	0	0
Earth Party (Note: Compared with the 2024 Alternative 21 coalition (MPT/Alliance).)		478	0.01	–0.06	0	0
Portuguese Labour Party		425	0.01	–0.03	0	0
Total		6,059,321	100.00	–	230	0
Valid votes		6,059,321	95.88	+0.24		
Invalid votes		172,994	2.74	–0.23		
Blank votes		87,654	1.39	–0.00		
Total votes		6,319,969	100.00	–		
Registered voters/turnout		10,848,816	58.25	–1.65		
Source: Comissão Nacional de Eleições

== Presidential elections ==
Under the Constitution of Portugal adopted in 1976, in the wake of the 1974 Carnation Revolution, the President is elected to a five-year term; there is no limit to the number of terms a president may serve, but a president who serves two consecutive terms may not serve again in the next five years after the second term finishes or in the following five years after his resignation. The official residence of the Portuguese President is the Belém Palace.

The President is elected in a two-round system: if no candidate reaches 50% of the votes during the first round, the two candidates with the most votes face each other in a second round held two weeks later. The 2026 presidential election was decided in a second round, 40 years after the 1986 presidential election, when a Portuguese presidential election was taken into a second round for the first time.

The most recent election was held in 2026 and the next is expected to be in 2031.

=== Latest election ===
==== 2026 presidential election ====
Candidate	Party	First round		Second round	
Candidate	Party	Votes	%	Votes	%
António José Seguro	Socialist Party (Note: Also supported by Volt Portugal.)	1,755,563	31.11	3,502,613	66.84
André Ventura	Chega	1,327,021	23.52	1,737,950	33.16
João Cotrim de Figueiredo	Liberal Initiative	903,057	16.00		
Henrique Gouveia e Melo	Independent (Note: Supported by the People's Monarchist Party.)	695,377	12.32		
Luís Marques Mendes	Social Democratic Party (Note: Also supported by CDS – People's Party.)	637,442	11.30		
Catarina Martins	Left Bloc	116,407	2.06		
António Filipe	Portuguese Communist Party (Note: Also supported by the Ecologist Party "The Greens".)	92,644	1.64		
Manuel João Vieira	Independent	60,927	1.08		
Jorge Pinto	LIVRE	38,588	0.68		
André Pestana	Independent (Note: Supported by the Socialist Alternative Movement.)	10,897	0.19		
Humberto Correia	Independent	4,773	0.08		
Total		5,642,696	100.00	5,240,563	100.00
Valid votes		5,642,696	97.82	5,240,563	95.01
Invalid votes		64,565	1.12	98,342	1.78
Blank votes		61,275	1.06	177,072	3.21
Total votes		5,768,536	100.00	5,515,977	100.00
Registered voters/turnout		11,009,803	52.39	11,025,823	50.03
Source: Comissão Nacional de Eleições

== Local elections ==
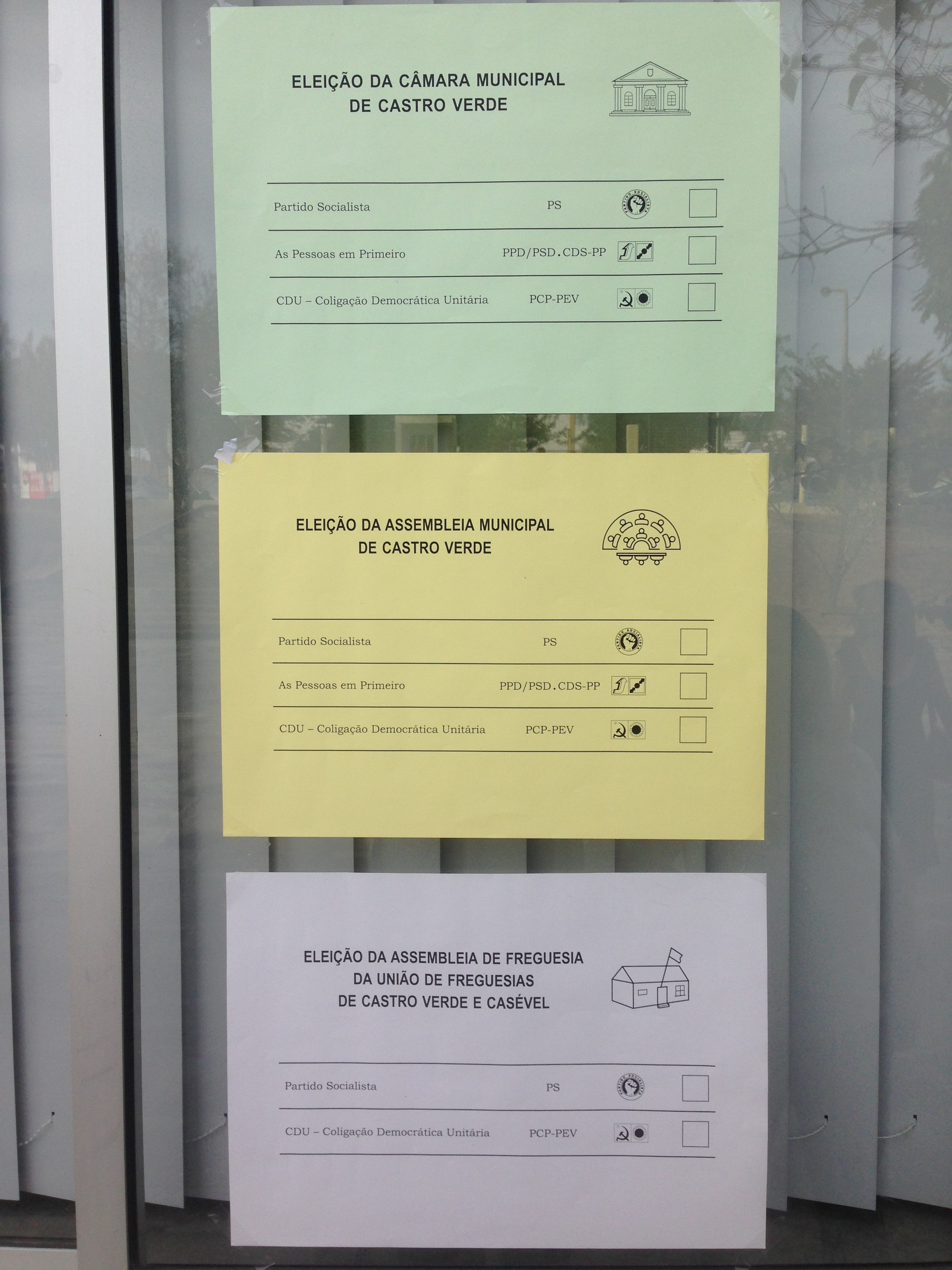
Ballots for the 2017 local elections in Castro Verde.

Since 1974, fourteen nationwide local elections were held:

- 1976 Portuguese local elections
- 1979 Portuguese local elections
- 1982 Portuguese local elections
- 1985 Portuguese local elections
- 1989 Portuguese local elections
- 1993 Portuguese local elections
- 1997 Portuguese local elections
- 2001 Portuguese local elections
- 2005 Portuguese local elections
- 2009 Portuguese local elections
- 2013 Portuguese local elections
- 2017 Portuguese local elections
- 2021 Portuguese local elections
- 2025 Portuguese local elections

== Autonomous Regions elections ==
Portugal has two autonomous regions, Azores and Madeira, that elect their own representatives for the regional parliaments every 4 years. The first elections were in 1976 and usually they were both held in the same day until 2007 when Madeira held an early election and Azores held its election the next year. The last election in Azores was on 4 February 2024, and Madeira was on 23 March 2025.

- Elections in Azores
- Elections in Madeira

== European Parliament elections ==
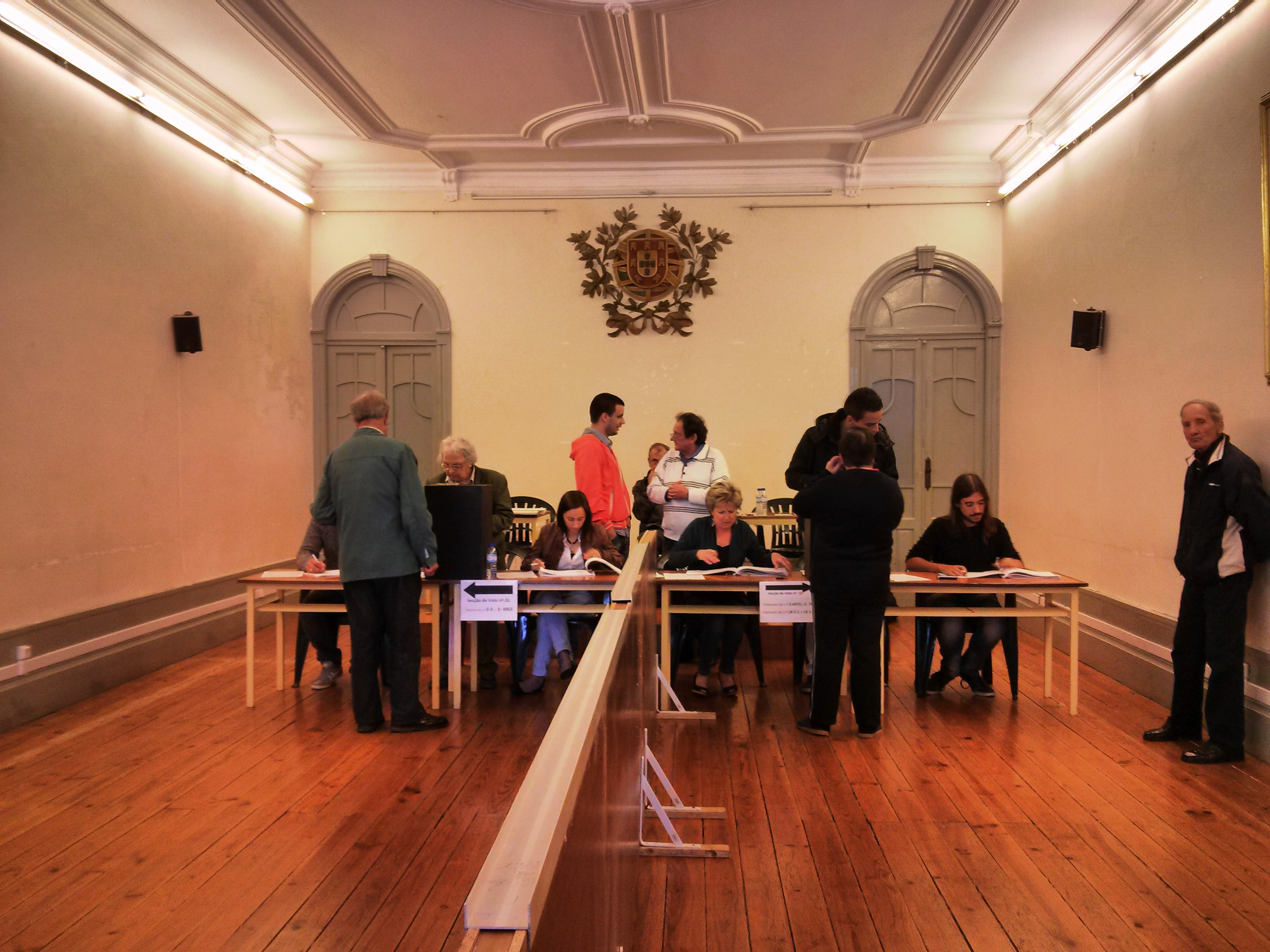
Polling station in Porto for the 2014 European Parliament election.

=== Election results 1987–2024 ===
Parties are listed from left-wing to right-wing.

Summary of Portuguese elections for the European Parliament, 1987–2024
Election	BE	CDU	L	PS	PAN	PRD	MPT	PSD	CDS	PPM	IL	CH	O/I	Turnout
1987		11.5		22.5		4.4		37.5	15.4	2.8			6.0	72.4
1989		14.4		28.5		w.PS		32.8	14.2	2.0			8.1	51.1
1994		11.2		34.9		0.2	0.4	34.4	12.5	0.3			6.2	35.5
1999	1.8	10.3		43.1			0.4	31.1	8.2	0.5			4.7	39.9
2004	4.9	9.1		44.5			0.4	33.3		0.5			7.4	38.6
2009	10.7	10.6		26.5			0.7	31.7	8.4	0.4			11.0	36.8
2014	4.6	12.7	2.2	31.5	1.7		7.2	27.7		0.5			12.0	33.7
2019	9.8	6.9	1.8	33.4	5.1			21.9	6.2	w.CH	0.9	1.5	12.5	30.7
2024	4.3	4.1	3.8	32.1	1.2		0.1	31.1			9.1	9.8	4.4	36.6
Source: Comissão Nacional de Eleições

== Referendums ==
The Constitution of Portugal defines referendum in Article 115. The referendum is called by the President of Portugal, on a proposal submitted by the Assembly or the Government. The President can refuse a proposal for referendum submitted to him by the Assembly or the Government if it is found to be unconstitutional or illegal. Referendums are binding if turnout is higher than 50% of registered voters.

Citizens of Portugal have the right to submit to the Assembly an initiative for a referendum.

The referendum can be held only on "important issues concerning the national interest which the Assembly of the Republic or the Government must decide by approving an international convention or passing a legislative act" (paragraph 3). The referendum cannot be held on amendments to the Constitution, budget, taxes, finances and competences of the Assembly, except when issue is the object of an international convention, except when the international convention concerns peace or the rectification of borders.

There have been four nationwide referendums in the History of Portugal:

- Constitutional referendum, in 1933
- First abortion referendum, in 1998
- Regionalization referendum, in 1998
- Second abortion referendum, in 2007

The Constitutional referendum of 1933 did not comply with the standards of a democratic suffrage, as, for example, abstentions were counted as supportive votes. It resulted in the establishing of the Estado Novo regime.

The later three referendums, held in the context of a Western-style liberal democracy had turnout less than 50%, so they were not binding. Nonetheless, decisions of all three referendums were honoured.

== See also ==
- Electoral calendar
- Electoral system
- List of political parties in Portugal
