= 1980 Portuguese legislative election =

- 5 October 1980

All 250 seats in the Assembly of the Republic 126 seats needed for a majority
- Registered: 7,179,023 ▼1.0%
- Turnout: 6,026,395 (83.9%) ▲1.0 pp
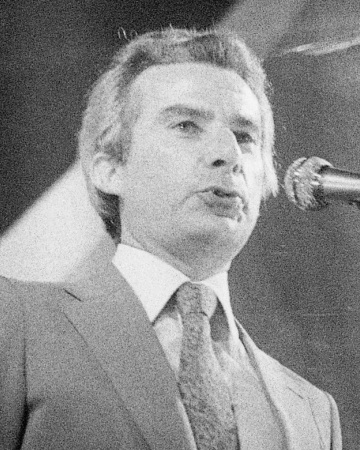

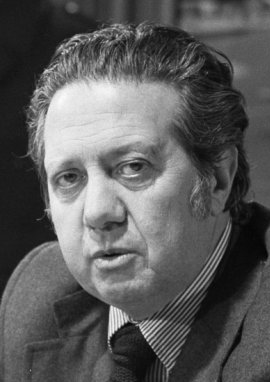

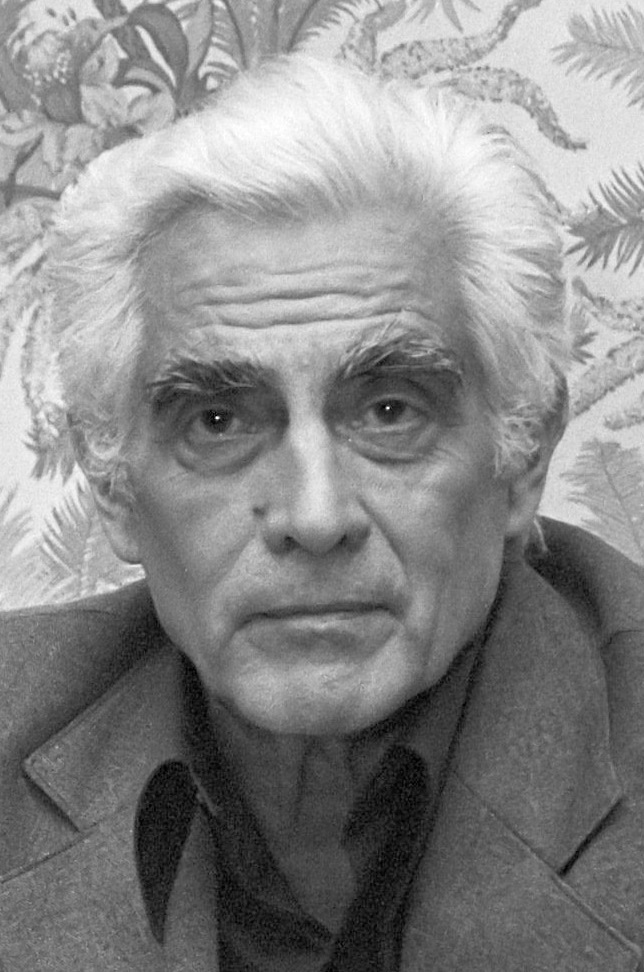

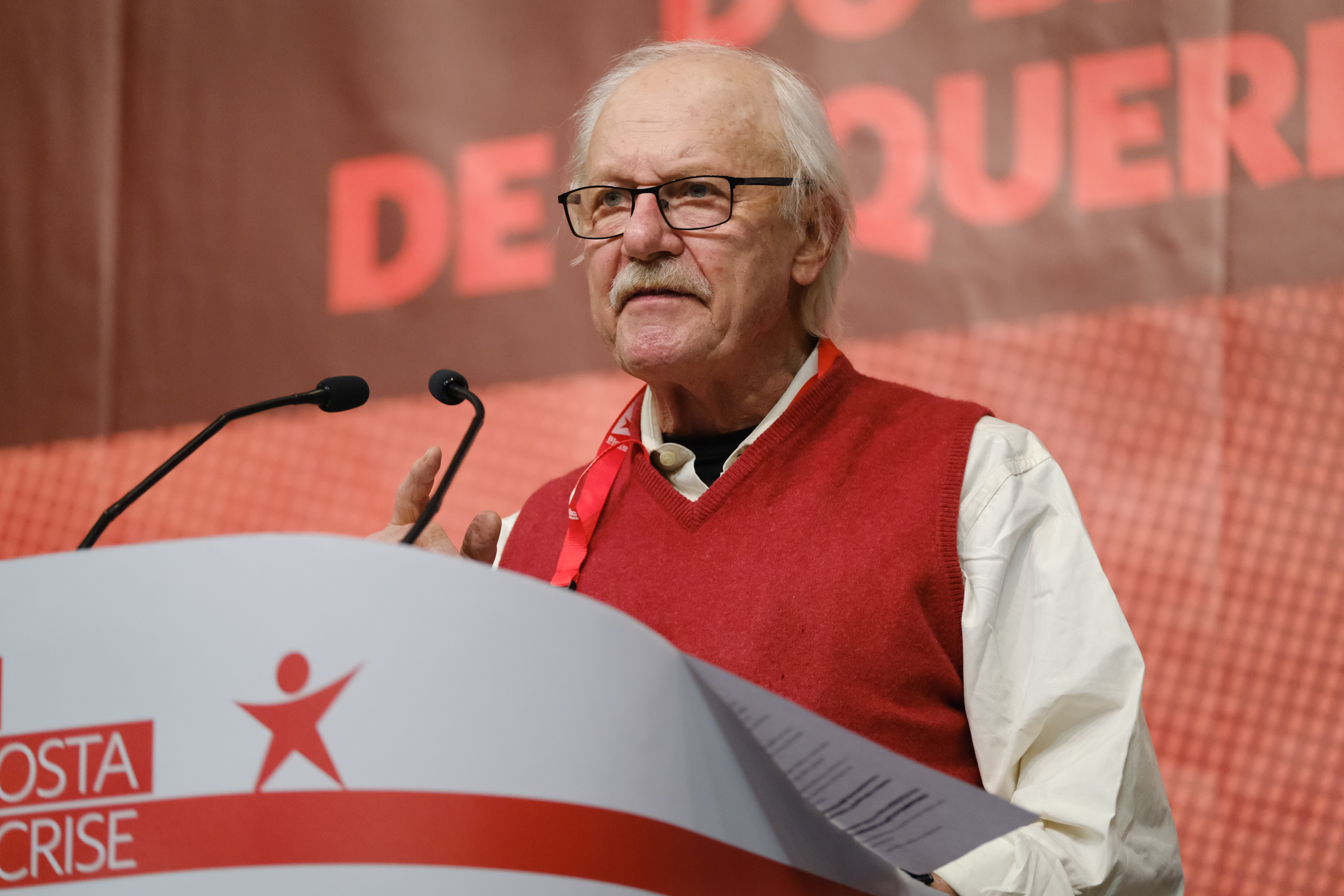
	First party	Second party
Leader	Francisco Sá Carneiro	Mário Soares
Party	PSD	PS
Alliance	AD	FRS
Leader since	2 July 1978 (Note: As leader of the Social Democratic Party (PSD).)	19 April 1973 (Note: As leader of the Socialist Party (PS).)
Leader's seat	Lisbon	Lisbon
Last election	128 seats, 45.3%	74 seats, 28.1% (Note: Republican and Socialist Front results are compared to the combined totals of the Socialist Party and the Left-wing Union for the Socialist Democracy in the 1979 election.)
Seats won	134	74
Seat change	▲6	0
Popular vote	2,868,076	1,673,279
Percentage	47.6%	27.8%
Swing	▲2.3 pp	▼0.3 pp
	Third party	Fourth party
Leader	Álvaro Cunhal	Mário Tomé
Party	PCP	UDP
Alliance	APU
Leader since	14 April 1978	1979
Leader's seat	Lisbon	Lisbon
Last election	47 seats, 18.8%	1 seat, 2.2%
Seats won	41	1
Seat change	▼6	0
Popular vote	1,009,505	83,204
Percentage	16.8%	1.4%
Swing	▼2.0 pp	▼0.8 pp
Prime Minister before election
Francisco Sá Carneiro
PSD
Prime Minister after election
Francisco Sá Carneiro
PSD

The 1980 Portuguese legislative election took place on 5 October. The election renewed all 250 members of the Assembly of the Republic.

Following the victory of the Democratic Alliance (AD) in the previous election, on 2 December 1979, Francisco Sá Carneiro was sworn in as Prime Minister in January 1980. However, since this was a special election and due to the decree that approved the Constitution, which stipulated that the first legislature had a fixed date of completion on 14 October 1980, another election had to be held.

The Democratic Alliance (AD) was again the winner and increased its majority from 10 months before, in December 1979. The AD won almost 48 percent of the votes and gathered 134 seats, an increase of six seats. The Socialist Party (PS), now leading a broad coalition called Republican and Socialist Front (FRS), got basically the same vote share and seats the PS alone obtained in 1979. The Communist led alliance, United People Alliance (APU) lost some ground, gathering almost 17 percent of the votes, 2 percentage points lower than 10 months earlier. The Popular Democratic Union (UDP) was again able to hold its sole seat, while the far-right neo-salazarist PDC–MIRN/PDP–FN coalition, failed to make any breakthrough.

Turnout was one of the highest ever, almost 84 percent, and in terms of ballots cast, the more than 6 million votes cast was a record in Portuguese elections for 44 years after being surpassed in the 2024 legislative election.

== Background ==
After taking office as prime minister in early 1980, marking the first peaceful transfer of power after the revolution, and with only a few months left to govern before a new election, Francisco Sá Carneiro's AD government initiated a series of policies, such as dismantling the post-revolution agrarian reforms by giving back illegally occupied lands to their legitimate owners and distribute plots of land to farmers, expansive economic policies to stimulate private investment, price controls and increase in social benefits, while on the other hand, a strong control of the media. The process of Portugal's accession to the European Economic Community was also relaunched after being frozen due to the political instability of the two years prior. The short government term would also be marked by the terrible relationship between President Ramalho Eanes and the prime minister.

On the opposition side, and in order to respond to the success of the AD, the Socialist Party (PS) decided to form a left-wing coalition called the Republican and Socialist Front (FRS), which also included the Left-wing Union for the Socialist Democracy (UEDS) and the Independent Social Democratic Action (ASDI).

== Electoral system ==
The Assembly of the Republic has 250 members elected to four-year terms. Governments do not require absolute majority support of the Assembly to hold office, as even if the number of opposers of government is larger than that of the supporters, the number of opposers still needs to be equal or greater than 126 (absolute majority) for both the Government's Programme to be rejected or for a motion of no confidence to be approved.

The number of seats assigned to each district depends on the district magnitude. The use of the d'Hondt method makes for a higher effective threshold than certain other allocation methods such as the Hare quota or Sainte-Laguë method, which are more generous to small parties.

For these elections, and compared with the 1979 elections, the MPs distributed by districts were the following:

District	Number of MPs	Map
Lisbon	56	
Porto	38	
Setúbal	17	
Aveiro and Braga	15	
Santarém and Coimbra	12	
Leiria	11	
Viseu	10	
Faro	9	
Castelo Branco, Viana do Castelo and Vila Real	6	
Azores, Beja, Évora, Guarda and Madeira	5	
Bragança and Portalegre	4	
Europe and Outside Europe	2	

== Parties ==
The table below lists the parties represented in the Assembly of the Republic during the second half of the 1st legislature (1976–1980), as the 1979 election was a national by-election, and that also contested the elections:

Name		Ideology	Political position	Leader	1979 result		Seats at dissolution
Name		Ideology	Political position	Leader	%	Seats	Seats at dissolution
PPD/PSD	Social Democratic Party; Partido Social Democrata	Liberal conservatism	Centre-right	Francisco Sá Carneiro	45.3% (Note: The Social Democratic Party (PSD), the Democratic Social Center (CDS) and the People's Monarchist Party (PPM) contested the 1979 election in a coalition called Democratic Alliance (AD) and won a combined 45.3% of the vote and elected 128 MP's to parliament.)	80 / 250	75 / 250
CDS	Democratic and Social Center; Centro Democrático e Social	Christian democracy	Centre-right to right-wing	Diogo Freitas do Amaral	45.3%	43 / 250	43 / 250
PPM	People's Monarchist Party; Partido Popular Monárquico	Monarchism; Green conservatism	Right-wing	Gonçalo Ribeiro Telles	45.3%	5 / 250	5 / 250
PS	Socialist Party; Partido Socialista	Social democracy	Centre-left	Mário Soares	27.3% (Note: The Socialist Party (PS), Left-wing Union for the Socialist Democracy (UEDS) and the Independent Social-Democratic Action (ASDI) would contest the 1980 election in a coalition called Republican and Socialist Front (FRS).)	74 / 250	74 / 250
PCP	Portuguese Communist Party; Partido Comunista Português	Communism; Marxism–Leninism	Far-left	Álvaro Cunhal	18.8% (Note: The Portuguese Communist Party (PCP) and the Portuguese Democratic Movement (MDP/CDE) contested the 1979 election in a coalition called United People Alliance (APU) and won a combined 18.8% of the vote and elected 47 MPs to parliament.)	44 / 250	44 / 250
MDP/CDE	Portuguese Democratic Movement; Movimento Democrático Português	Left-wing nationalism Democratic socialism	Left-wing	José Manuel Tengarrinha	18.8%	3 / 250	3 / 250
UDP	Popular Democratic Union; União Democrática Popular	Marxism; Socialism	Left-wing	Mário Tomé	2.2%	1 / 250	1 / 250
MR	The Reformers; Os Reformadores	Francisco Sousa Tavares (left the Social Democratic Party caucus); José Medeiros Ferreira (left the Social Democratic Party caucus); Armando Adão Silva (left the Social Democratic Party caucus); Nuno Maria Matos (left the Social Democratic Party caucus); Pelágio Madureira (left the Social Democratic Party caucus)					5 / 250

=== Seat changes ===
- In January 1980, MPs Francisco Sousa Tavares, José Medeiros Ferreira, Armando Adão Silva, Nuno Maria Matos and Pelágio Madureira, elected in the Democratic Alliance lists, left the Social Democratic Party caucus and formed their own parliamentary group, the Reformers, following the agreement made with AD in order for them to be elected.

== Campaign period ==
=== Issues ===
The campaign was dominated by deep political and personal divisions. The Socialist Party (PS)-led coalition, the Republican and Socialist Front (FRS), campaigned against Prime Minister Francisco Sá Carneiro mostly on personal issues, criticizing his marital situation of living with another woman, Snu Abecassis, while still remaining married to his first wife, in addition to the accusation that Sá Carneiro owed money to the banks, an issue also raised by the Communists. The Democratic Alliance (AD) campaign responded with the accusation that Soares' father was a defrocked priest. The clash between Sá Carneiro and President Ramalho Eanes was also center stage during the campaign, with the AD blaming the political stalemate on the President, in addition to the Alliance wanting to modify the constitution by a simple majority, via referendum, a move that was rejected by Eanes.

=== Party slogans ===
Party or alliance	Original slogan	English translation	Refs
AD	« Garantir o progresso. »	"Ensure progress."	
FRS	« Um governo para todos. A sua segurança. »	"A government for all. Your safety."	
APU	« Vota APU, para a vitória de Abril »	"Vote APU, for the victory of April"	
UDP	« Abril de novo pela força do povo »	"April again by the strength of the people"	

== Opinion polling ==
Polling firm/Link	Date Released	AD	FRS	APU	UDP	O	Lead
1980 legislative election	5 Oct 1980	47.6; 134	27.8; 74	16.8; 41	1.4; 1	6.4; 0	19.8
Antropos (Note: Results presented here exclude undecideds (17.6%) and doesn't answer (16.4%). With their inclusion results are: AD: 34.4%; FRS: 21.4%; APU: 9.1%; Others/Invalid: 1.2%.)	Sep 1980	52.0	32.4	13.8	—N/a	1.8	19.6
Norma/Expresso	12 Jul 1980	43.1	22.5	8.9	1.5	24.0	20.6
Antropos (Note: Results presented here exclude undecideds (15.1%) and doesn't answer (8.2%). With their inclusion results are: AD: 37.9%; FRS: 26.8%; APU: 9.1%; Others/Invalid: 2.9%.)	Jul 1980	49.4	34.9	11.9	—N/a	3.8	14.5
1979 local elections	16 Dec 1979	47.2	27.7	20.5	1.3	3.3	19.5
1979 legislative election	2 Dec 1979	45.3; 128	27.3; 74	18.8; 47	2.2; 1	6.4; 0	17.5

== Results ==
=== National summary ===
Party or alliance		Votes	%	+/–	Seats	+/–
Democratic Alliance	Democratic Alliance (Note: Alliance formed by the Social Democratic Party (74 seats), the Democratic and Social Centre (46 seats) and the People's Monarchist Party (6 seats).)	2,706,667	44.91	+2.39	126	+5
Democratic Alliance	Social Democratic Party (Note: Social Democratic Party and Democratic and Social Centre electoral list only in Azores and Madeira.)	147,644	2.45	+0.10	8	+1
Democratic Alliance	Democratic and Social Centre	13,765	0.23	–0.16	0	0
Democratic Alliance	Total	2,868,076	47.59	+3.44	134	+6
Republican and Socialist Front	Republican and Socialist Front (Note: Alliance formed by the Socialist Party (63 seats), the Leftwing Union for the Socialist Democracy (4 seats) and the Independent Social-Democratic Action (4 seats).)	1,606,198	26.65	—	71	—
Republican and Socialist Front	Socialist Party (Note: Socialist Party electoral list only in Azores and Madeira.)	67,081	1.11	—	3	—
Republican and Socialist Front	Total	1,673,279	27.77	+0.36	74	0
United People Alliance (Note: Portuguese Communist Party (39 MPs) and Portuguese Democratic Movement (2 MPs) ran in coalition.)		1,009,505	16.75	–2.05	41	–6
Popular Democratic Union		83,204	1.38	–0.80	1	0
Workers' Party of Socialist Unity		83,095	1.38	+1.17	0	0
Revolutionary Socialist		60,496	1.00	+0.38	0	0
Labour Party		39,408	0.65	New	0	New
Portuguese Workers' Communist Party		35,409	0.59	–0.30	0	0
PDC–MIRN/PDP–FN		23,819	0.40	–0.81	0	0
Democratic Party of the Atlantic		8,529	0.14	New	0	New
Portuguese Marxist–Leninist Communist Organization		3,913	0.06	+0.00	0	0
Total		5,888,733	100.00	–	250	0
Valid votes		5,888,733	97.72	+0.45		
Invalid votes		103,140	1.71	–0.30		
Blank votes		34,522	0.57	–0.14		
Total votes		6,026,395	100.00	–		
Registered voters/turnout		7,179,023	83.94	+1.07		
Source: Comissão Nacional de Eleições

Vote share
AD	44.91%
FRS	26.65%
APU	16.75%
PSD	2.45%
UDP	1.38%
POUS	1.38%
PS	1.11%
PSR	1.00%
AOC	0.65%
PCTP/MRPP	0.59%
Others	0.83%
Blank/Invalid	2.28%

Parliamentary seats
AD	50.40%
FRS	28.40%
APU	16.40%
PSD	3.20%
PS	1.20%
UDP	0.40%

=== Distribution by constituency ===
Results of the 1980 election of the Portuguese Assembly of the Republic by constituency
Constituency	%	S	%	S	%	S	%	S	%	S	%	S	Total S
Constituency	AD		FRS		APU		PSD		PS		UDP		Total S
Azores					3.1	-	57.0	4	27.3	1	1.3	-	5
Aveiro	58.8	10	27.1	4	6.8	1							15
Beja	22.4	1	21.1	1	47.1	3					1.3	-	5
Braga	54.9	9	29.3	5	8.4	1					0.9	-	15
Bragança	65.3	3	21.3	1	4.8	-					1.0	-	4
Castelo Branco	51.0	4	30.3	2	10.5	-					0.7	-	6
Coimbra	46.1	6	35.9	5	9.9	1					0.8	-	12
Évora	29.2	1	18.7	1	45.7	3					0.9	-	5
Faro	37.2	4	34.7	4	16.7	1					1.9	-	9
Guarda	60.6	4	26.3	1	5.0	-					0.7	-	5
Leiria	59.8	7	22.7	3	9.7	1					1.0	-	11
Lisbon	41.6	25	28.1	17	23.1	13					1.7	1	56
Madeira					2.9	-	63.6	4	16.5	1	4.5	-	5
Portalegre	33.4	2	32.4	1	26.1	1					0.7	-	4
Porto	46.6	19	34.3	14	11.9	5					1.4	-	38
Santarém	42.1	6	30.4	4	19.0	2					1.2	-	12
Setúbal	24.1	4	23.5	4	44.0	9					2.8	-	17
Viana do Castelo	59.2	5	22.8	1	10.0	-					0.7	-	6
Vila Real	62.1	5	22.8	1	5.1	-					0.8	-	6
Viseu	66.8	8	20.9	2	5.0	-					0.6	-	10
Europe	49.6	1			15.2	-			25.4	1	1.4	-	2
Outside Europe	85.5	2			2.6	-			4.0	-	0.4	-	2
Total	44.9	126	26.7	71	16.8	41	2.5	8	1.1	3	1.4	1	250
Source: Comissão Nacional de Eleições

=== Maps ===
Winner and seats by constituency.

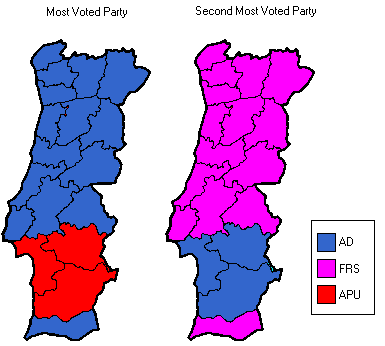
First and second most voted political force by constituency.

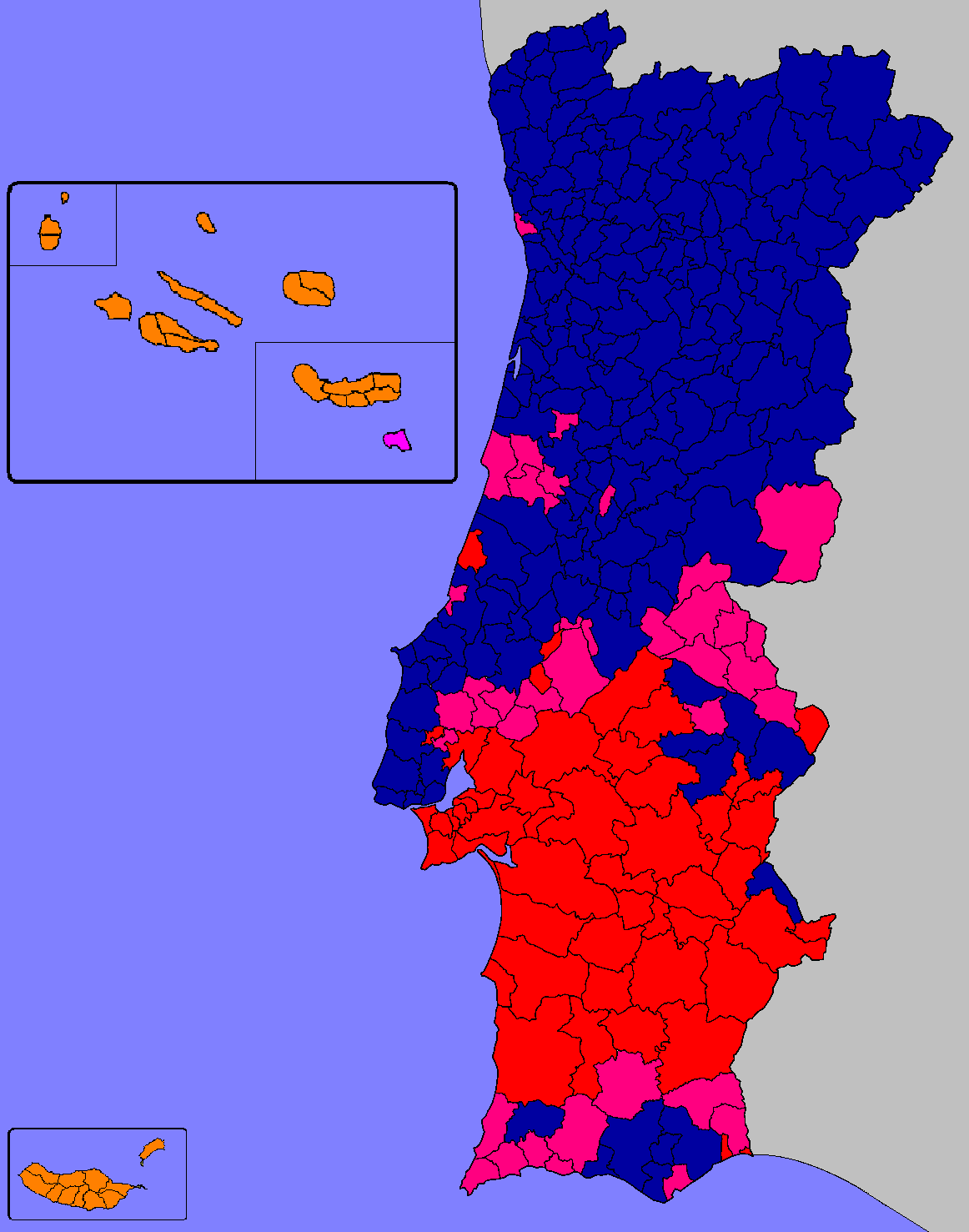
Most voted political force by municipality.

== Aftermath ==
=== Death of Francisco Sá Carneiro ===
Just two months after winning the 1980 election, and while campaigning for the Democratic Alliance's candidate for the December 1980 Presidential election, Prime Minister Francisco Sá Carneiro and his Defense minister Adelino Amaro da Costa, along with their spouses Snu Abecassis and Maria Vaz Pires, respectively, plus the plane's pilot, died in tragic air crash when the small aircraft they were on board crashed and burned in Camarate, Loures, shortly after taking off from Lisbon Airport. This tragic air crash sparked a series of conspirancy theories, mainly because of Portugal's involvement in the Iran–Iraq War and the supply of weapons to both Iraq and Iran. Several investigations surrounding the crash were conducted and the official cause of the crash is still a matter of intense debate. Diogo Freitas do Amaral was appointed as interim Prime Minister until the election of Francisco Pinto Balsemão as PSD leader and subsequent nomination as Prime Minister.

=== Fall of the government ===
Balsemão's governments were very unstable due to lack of leadership and deep disagreements between the three parties that composed the Democratic Alliance (AD). In the 1982 local elections, the AD was able to gather 42 percent of the votes, against the 31 percent of the PS and 20.5 percent of APU, but suffered loses and many within the coalition, mainly Diogo Freitas do Amaral, labeled the results as a disaster. With this background, Pinto Balsemão resigned as Prime Minister and the PSD proposed an alternative name for Prime Minister to President António Ramalho Eanes. However, President Eanes refused to swear in a new AD government and dissolved Parliament by calling an election for 25 April 1983.

== See also ==
- Politics of Portugal
- List of political parties in Portugal
- Elections in Portugal
