= 1982 Portuguese local elections =

- 12 December 1982

All 305 Portuguese municipalities and 4,260 Portuguese Parishes All 1,949 local government councils
- Turnout: 71.4% ▼2.3 pp
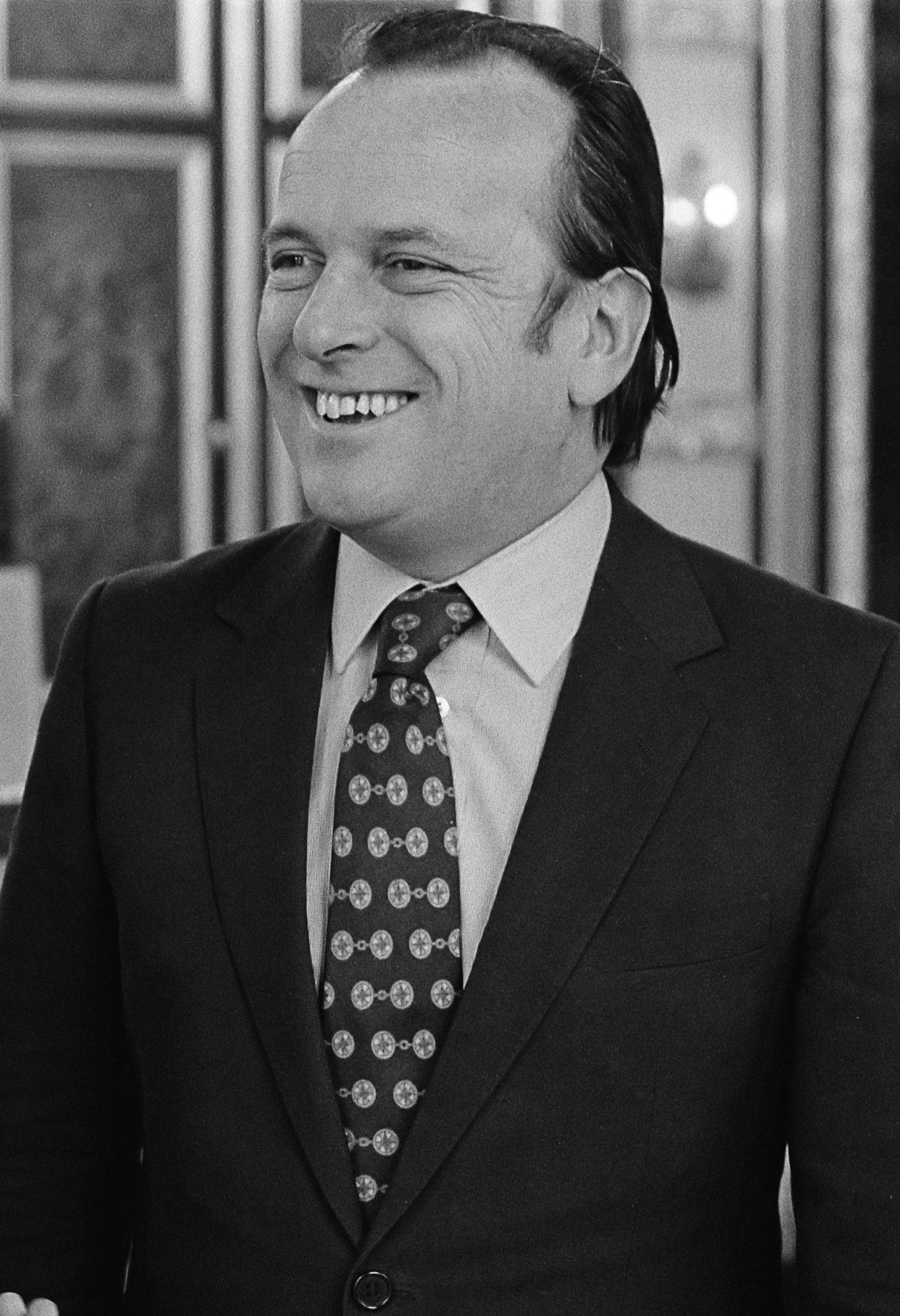

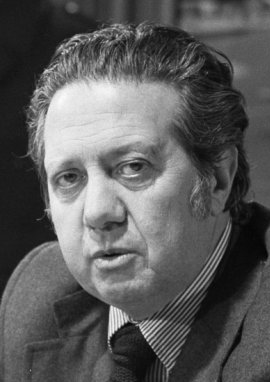

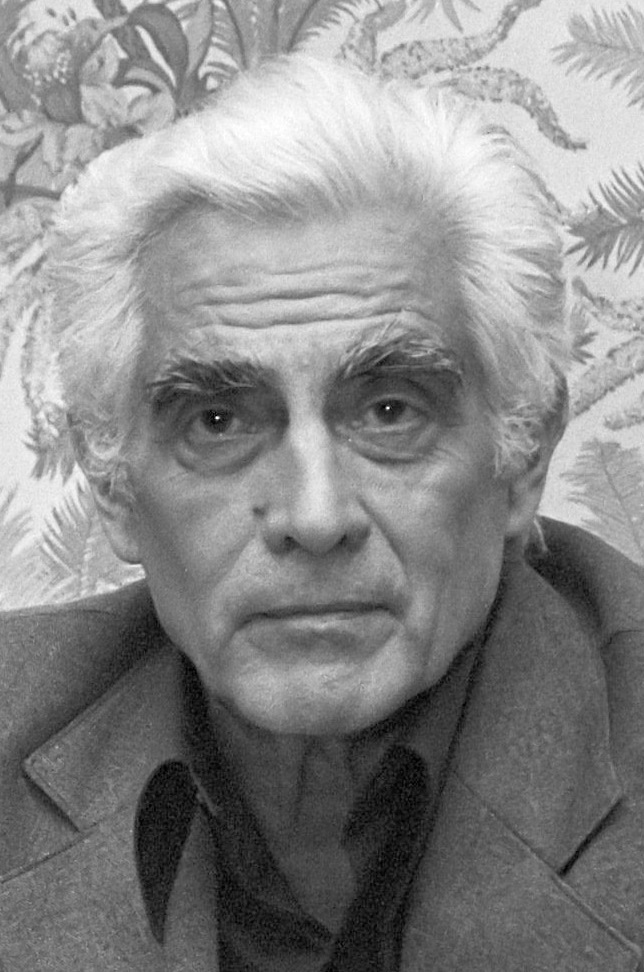
	First party	Second party	Third party
Leader	Francisco Pinto Balsemão	Mário Soares	Álvaro Cunhal
Party	PSD	PS	PCP
Alliance	AD		APU
Last election	195 mayors, 47.2%	60 mayors, 27.7%	50 mayors, 19.9%
Popular vote	2,183,122	1,632,825	1,061,492
Percentage	42.5%	31.8%	20.7%
Swing	▼4.7 pp	▲4.1 pp	▲0.2 pp
Mayors	165	84	55
Mayors +/–	▼30	▲24	▲5
Councillors	973	642	325
Councillors +/–	▼114	▲119	▲3

Local elections were held in Portugal on 12 December 1982. They were the third local elections in Portugal since the 1976 Constitution introduced the concept of democratic local power.

The elections consisted of three separate elections in the 305 Portuguese municipalities that existed at the time, the election for the Municipal Chambers, another election for the Municipal Assembly and a last one for the lower-level Parish Assembly, whose winner is elected parish president, this last was held separately in the more than 4,000 parishes around the country.

Once again, the Socialist Party finished on the top of the results table, increasing its share by 4 points, however, the total aggregate of the Democratic Alliance (AD), between the Democratic and Social Center, the Social Democratic Party and the People's Monarchist Party, stood at 42 percent of the votes and elected 165 mayors. The Alliance, however, lost some ground compared with the previous election, with the then PSD leader and Prime Minister Francisco Pinto Balsemão considering the results a disappointment, citing divisions within both his own party and the alliance, and resigning from both posts. This decision led to a snap general election in April 1983.

The left-wing United People Alliance dominated the election in the municipalities of the South of the country, gathering more than 60 percent of the votes and achieving its best result ever with 20.7 percent and 55 mayors. These would be the last elections in which local members would be elected for a 3-year term.

== Background ==
=== Electoral system ===
All 305 municipalities are allocated a certain number of councilors to elect corresponding to the number of registered voters in a given municipality. Each party or coalition must present a list of candidates. The winner of the most voted list for the municipal council is automatically elected mayor, similar to first-past-the-post (FPTP). The lists are closed and the seats in each municipality are apportioned according to the D'Hondt method.

=== By-elections (1979–1982) ===
During the normal three-year term of local governments, nine municipal council by-elections were held: In the municipality of Corvo on 18 May 1980; In the municipality of Vila do Porto on 20 July 1980; In the municipality of Aguiar da Beira on 27 July 1980; In the municipality of Mealhada on 23 November 1980; In the municipality of Murça on 31 May 1981; In the municipality of Nazaré on 14 June 1981; In the municipality of Valpaços on 13 September 1981; In the municipality of Loures on 11 October 1981; In the municipality of Praia da Vitória on 14 February 1982, adding to this, ninety-seven parishes also held a by-election for parish assemblies.

City control in by-elections (1979–1982)
Date	Municipality	Population	Previous control	New control
18 May 1980	Corvo	470	Social Democratic Party (PSD)	Socialist Party (PS)
20 July 1980	Vila do Porto	9,765	Social Democratic Party (PSD)	Socialist Party (PS)
27 July 1980	Aguiar da Beira	8,464	Democratic Alliance (AD)	Democratic and Social Center (CDS)
23 November 1980	Mealhada	16,669	Democratic Alliance (AD)	Socialist Party (PS)
31 May 1981	Murça	8,518	Social Democratic Party (PSD)	Democratic and Social Center (CDS)
14 June 1981	Nazaré	15,436	Socialist Party (PS)	Socialist Party (PS)
13 September 1981	Valpaços	26,066	Democratic Alliance (AD)	Social Democratic Party (PSD)
11 October 1981	Loures	276,467	United People Alliance (APU)	United People Alliance (APU)
14 February 1982	Praia da Vitória	20,762	Social Democratic Party (PSD)	Social Democratic Party (PSD)

== Parties ==
The main political forces involved in the election were:

- Democratic Alliance (AD) (only in some municipalities)
- Democratic and Social Center (CDS) (only in some municipalities)
- Socialist Party (PS)
- Social Democratic Party (PSD) (only in some municipalities)
- United People Alliance (APU)

== Results ==
=== Municipal Councils ===
==== National summary of votes and seats ====
Summary of the 12 December 1982 Municipal Councils elections results
Parties	Votes	%	±pp swing	Candidacies	Councillors		Mayors	
Parties	Votes	%	±pp swing	Candidacies	Total	±	Total	±
Socialist	1,595,723	31.10	▲3.4	294	628	▲105	83	▲23
United People Alliance	1,061,492	20.69	▲0.2	300	325	▲3	55	▲5
Democratic Alliance	1,004,065	19.57	▼5.9	124	329	▼107	49	▼24
Social Democratic	750,296	14.62	▼0.1	170	442	▼38	88	▼13
Democratic and Social Centre	386,527	7.53	▼0.1	134	191	▲26	27	▲7
Socialist / UEDS	37,102	0.72	—	5	14	—	1	—
Popular Democratic Union	31,973	0.62	▼0.7	72	3	0	0	0
Democratic Union	30,941	0.60	—	2	6	—	0	—
Portuguese Workers' Communist	16,263	0.32	▼0.2	36	0	0	0	0
People's Monarchist	11,293	0.22	▲0.1	10	5	▼1	1	0
Independent Social Democratic Action	7,156	0.14	—	7	7	—	1	—
Workers Party of Socialist Unity	5,519	0.11	▲0.1	5	0	0	0	0
OCMLP	1,450	0.03	—	6	0	—	0	—
Christian Democratic	849	0.02	▼0.1	1	0	0	0	▼2
**Total valid**	**4,940,649**	**96.28**	**▼1.1**	—	**1,949**	**▲12**	**305**	**0**
Blank ballots	90,037	1.75	▲0.7					
Invalid ballots	100,797	1.96	▲0.4					
**Total**	**5,131,483**	**100.00**						
Registered voters/turnout	7,185,284	71.42	▼2.3					

==== Municipality map ====
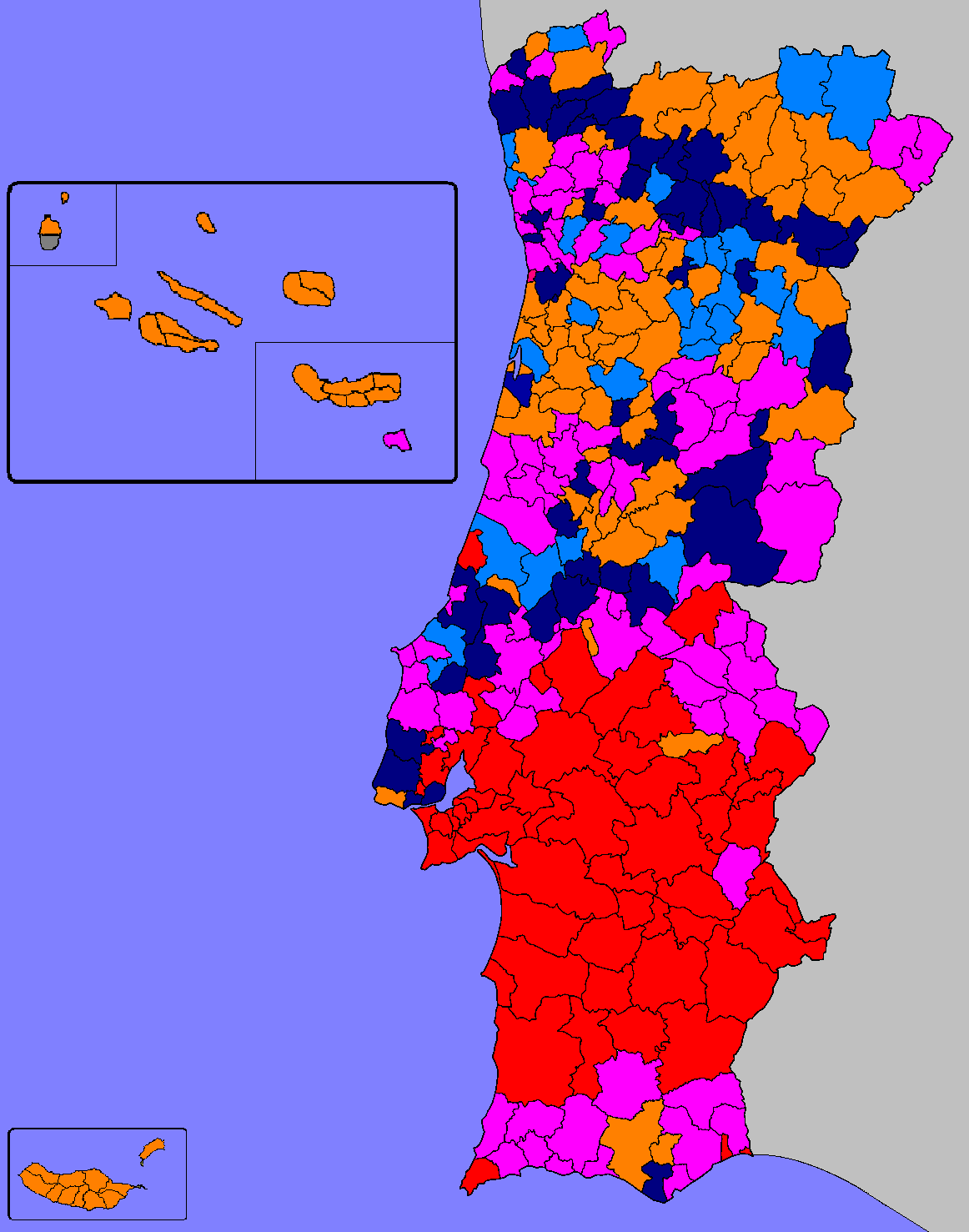
Most voted parties or coalitions in each Municipality. Municipalities won by: ■ - PS: 84 ■ - APU: 55 ■ - AD: 49 ■ - PSD: 88 ■ - CDS: 27 ■ - PPM: 1 ■ - ASDI: 1

==== City control ====
The following table lists party control in all district capitals, highlighted in bold, as well as in municipalities above 100,000 inhabitants. Population estimates from the 1981 Census.

Municipality	Population	Previous control	New control
Almada	147,690	United People Alliance (APU)	United People Alliance (APU)
Amadora	163,878	United People Alliance (APU)	United People Alliance (APU)
**Aveiro**	60,284	Democratic and Social Centre (CDS)	Democratic and Social Centre (CDS)
Barcelos	103,773	Social Democratic Party (PSD)	Social Democratic Party (PSD)
**Beja**	38,246	United People Alliance (APU)	United People Alliance (APU)
**Braga**	125,472	Socialist Party (PS)	Socialist Party (PS)
**Bragança**	35,380	Social Democratic Party (PSD)	Democratic and Social Centre (CDS)
Cascais	141,498	Democratic and Social Centre (CDS)	Social Democratic Party (PSD)
**Castelo Branco**	54,908	Democratic Alliance (AD)	Democratic Alliance (AD)
**Coimbra**	138,930	Democratic Alliance (AD)	Socialist Party (PS)
**Évora**	51,572	United People Alliance (APU)	United People Alliance (APU)
**Faro**	45,109	Democratic Alliance (AD)	Democratic Alliance (AD)
**Funchal**	112,746	Social Democratic Party (PSD)	Social Democratic Party (PSD)
Gondomar	130,751	Democratic Alliance (AD)	Socialist Party (PS)
**Guarda**	40,360	Socialist Party (PS)	Socialist Party (PS)
Guimarães	146,959	Democratic Alliance (AD)	Socialist Party (PS)
**Leiria**	96,517	Social Democratic Party (PSD)	Democratic and Social Centre (CDS)
**Lisbon**	807,937	Democratic Alliance (AD)	Democratic Alliance (AD)
Loures	276,467	United People Alliance (APU)	United People Alliance (APU)
Matosinhos	136,498	Socialist Party (PS)	Socialist Party (PS)
Oeiras	149,328	Democratic Alliance (AD)	Democratic Alliance (AD)
**Ponta Delgada**	63,804	Social Democratic Party (PSD)	Social Democratic Party (PSD)
**Portalegre**	27,313	Democratic Alliance (AD)	Socialist Party (PS)
**Porto**	327,368	Democratic Alliance (AD)	Democratic Alliance (AD)
**Santarém**	62,896	Socialist Party (PS)	Socialist Party (PS)
Santa Maria da Feira	109,531	Social Democratic Party (PSD)	Democratic Alliance (AD)
**Setúbal**	98,366	United People Alliance (APU)	United People Alliance (APU)
Sintra	226,428	Democratic Alliance (AD)	Democratic Alliance (AD)
**Viana do Castelo**	81,009	Democratic Alliance (AD)	Democratic Alliance (AD)
Vila Nova de Famalicão	106,508	Democratic Alliance (AD)	Socialist Party (PS)
Vila Nova de Gaia	226,331	Democratic Alliance (AD)	Socialist Party (PS)
**Vila Real**	47,020	Social Democratic Party (PSD)	Democratic Alliance (AD)
**Viseu**	83,261	Democratic and Social Centre (CDS)	Social Democratic Party (PSD)

=== Municipal Assemblies ===
==== National summary of votes and seats ====
Summary of the 12 December 1982 Municipal Assemblies elections results
Parties	Votes	%	±pp swing	Candidacies	Mandates	
Parties	Votes	%	±pp swing	Candidacies	Total	±
Socialist	1,583,544	31.06	▲3.8		3,203	▲455
United People Alliance	1,076,742	20.98	▲0.1		1,781	▼4
Democratic Alliance	995,108	19.39	▼6.4		1,656	▼530
Social Democratic	725,203	14.13	▼1.0		2,159	▼97
Democratic and Social Centre	395,648	7.71	▲1.4		1,014	▲151
Socialist / UEDS	37,409	0.73	—		65	—
Popular Democratic Union	34,788	0.68	▼0.7		20	▼39
Democratic Union	30,675	0.60	—		40	—
People's Monarchist	10,553	0.21	▲0.1		28	▲2
Portuguese Workers' Communist	7,126	0.14	▼0.1		1	▲1
Independent Social Democratic Action	6,783	0.13	—		32	—
Workers Party of Socialist Unity	2,463	0.05	—		0	—
Christian Democratic	851	0.02	▲0.0		2	▲2
OCMLP	520	0.01	—		0	—
**Total valid**	**4,917,413**	**95.83**	**▼1.4**	—	**10,001**	**▲75**
Blank ballots	112,966	2.20	▲0.9			
Invalid ballots	100,848	1.97	▲0.5			
**Total**	**5,131,227**	**100.00**				
Registered voters/turnout	7,185,284	71.41	▼2.4			

=== Parish Assemblies ===
==== National summary of votes and seats ====
Summary of the 12 December 1982 Parish Assemblies elections results
Parties	Votes	%	±pp swing	Candidacies	Mandates		Presidents	
Parties	Votes	%	±pp swing	Candidacies	Total	±	Total	±
Socialist	1,551,888	30.43	▲3.2		12,848	▲1,900	1,025	▲212
United People Alliance	1,085,127	21.28	▲0.4		5,099	▲27	334	▲35
Democratic Alliance	925,065	18.14	▼6.9		7,863	▼2,508	754	▼290
Social Democratic	775,353	15.21	▼0.1		9,585	▼46	1,042	▼20
Democratic and Social Centre	400,306	7.85	▲1.4		4,944	▲684	413	▲23
Independents	60,209	1.18	▲0.2		999	▲302	113	▲38
Socialist / UEDS	30,820	0.60	—		281	—	18	—
Democratic Union	29,470	0.58	—		340	—	34	—
Popular Democratic Union	25,264	0.50	▼0.5		31	▼25	1	0
People's Monarchist	6,341	0.12	▲0.0		103	▲25	9	▲1
Independent Social Democratic Action	4,534	0.09	—		50	—	2	—
Portuguese Workers' Communist	4,390	0.09	▼0.1		0	▼3	0	0
Workers Party of Socialist Unity	809	0.02	0.0		0	▼1	0	0
Christian Democratic	503	0.01	▼0.0		0	▼24	0	▼1
OCMLP	452	0.01	—		0	—	0	—
**Total valid**	**4,900,531**	**96.11**	**▼1.1**	—	**42,143**	**▲999**	**3,745**	**▲52**
Blank ballots	92,462	1.81	▲0.6					
Invalid ballots	106,117	2.08	▲0.5					
**Total**	**5,099,110**	**100.00**						
Registered voters/turnout	7,139,401	71,42	▼2.4					

=== Maps ===
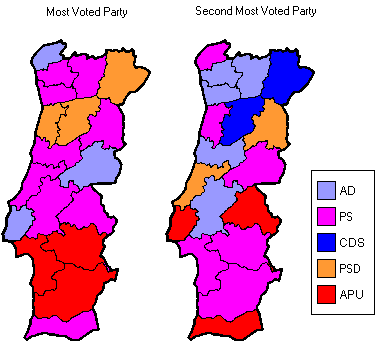
The first and the second most voted parties in Municipal Councils in each district. (Azores and Madeira are not shown)

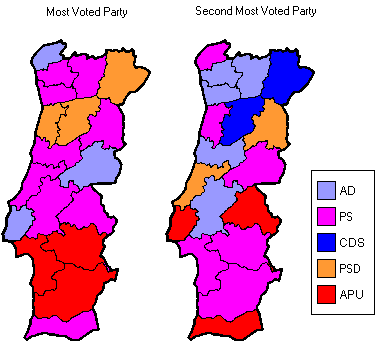
The first and the second most voted parties in Municipal Assemblies in each district. (Azores and Madeira are not shown)

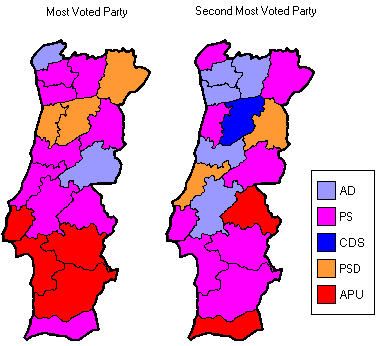
The first and the second most voted parties in Parish Assemblies in each district. (Azores and Madeira are not shown)

== Notes ==
- The source of the voting data is the Portuguese Electoral Commission

Further Notes:

- Democratic Alliance (AD) was composed by the Democratic Social Center (CDS), the Social Democratic Party (PSD) and the People's Monarchist Party (PPM).
- Although the PSD, the CDS and the PPM were united in the Democratic Alliance, they appear in the scorecard because they ran separated in several municipalities.
- The Democratic Union (UD) was composed only by the Democratic Social Center (CDS) and the Social Democratic Party (PSD)
- United People Alliance (APU) was composed by the Portuguese Communist Party (PCP) and the Portuguese Democratic Movement (MDP/CDE).
- The number of candidacies expresses the number of municipalities or parishes in which the party or coalition presented lists.
- The number of mandates expresses the number of municipal deputies in the Municipal Assembly election and the number of parish deputies in the Parish Assembly election.
- The turnout varies because one may choose not to vote for all the organs.

== See also ==
- Politics of Portugal
- List of political parties in Portugal
- Elections in Portugal
