= 1979 Portuguese local elections =

- 16 December 1979

All 305 Portuguese municipalities and 4,260 Portuguese Parishes All 1,937 local government councils
- Turnout: 73.8% ▲9.2 pp
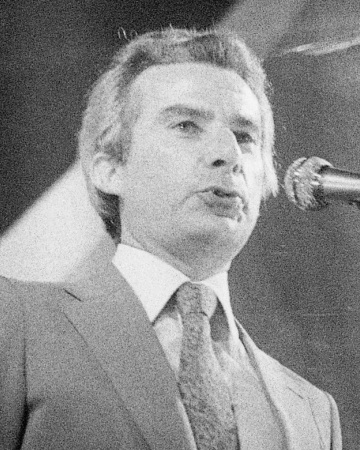

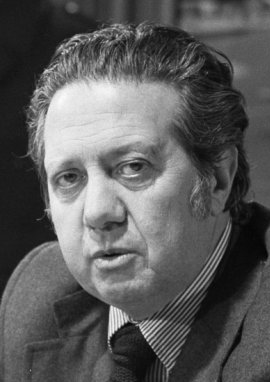

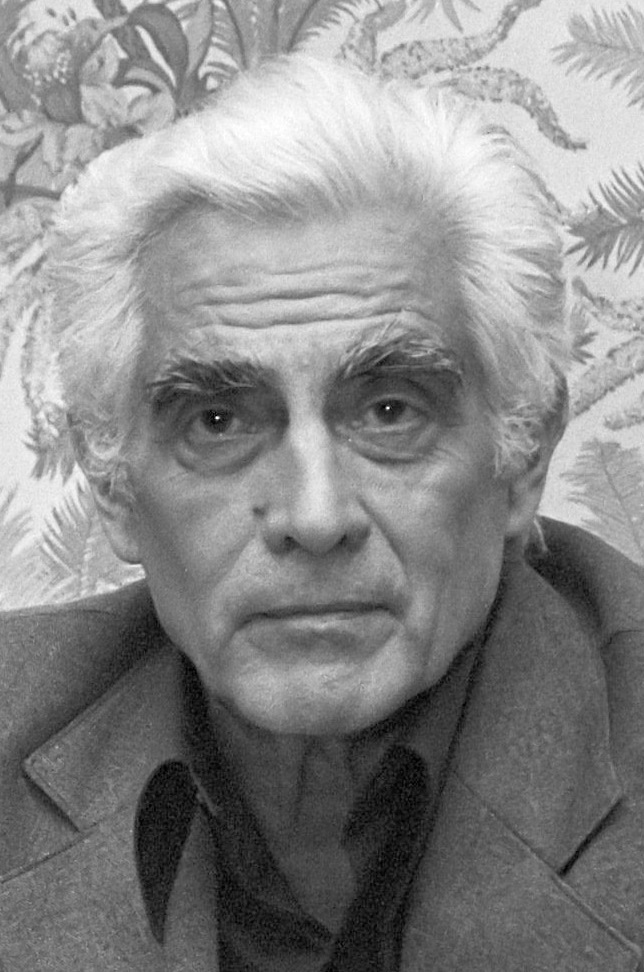
	First party	Second party	Third party
Leader	Francisco Sá Carneiro	Mário Soares	Álvaro Cunhal
Party	PSD	PS	PCP
Alliance	AD		APU
Last election	152 mayors, 41.1%	115 mayors, 33.0%	37 mayors, 17.3%
Popular vote	2,356,506	1,380,134	1,021,486
Percentage	47.2%	27.7%	20.5%
Swing	▲6.1 pp	▼5.3 pp	▲2.8 pp
Mayors	195	60	50
Mayors +/–	▲43	▼55	▲13
Councillors	1,087	523	322
Councillors +/–	▲144	▼168	▲55

Local elections were held in Portugal on 16 December 1979. They were the 2nd local elections in Portugal since the 1976 Constitution introduced the concept of democratic local power. The elections took place just two weeks after the 1979 legislative election.

The elections consisted of three separate elections in the 305 Portuguese municipalities, the election for the Municipal Chambers, another election for the Municipal Assembly and a last one for the lower-level Parish Assembly, whose winner is elected parish president, this last was held separately in the more than 4,000 parishes around the country.

Despite the Socialist Party finished on the top of the results table, the big winner was the Democratic Alliance, winning altogether 47 percent of the votes and electing 195 mayors, as the parties that composed it, the Democratic and Social Center, the Social Democratic Party and the People's Monarchist Party, presented individual lists in several municipalities.

The left-wing United People Alliance dominated the election in the municipalities of the South of the country, gathering more than 60 percent of the votes.

Turnout in these elections increased compared with the 1976 election, as 71.7 percent of the electorate cast a ballot, the highest turnout recorded in a nationwide local election.

== Background ==
=== Electoral system ===
All 305 municipalities are allocated a certain number of councilors to elect corresponding to the number of registered voters in a given municipality. Each party or coalition must present a list of candidates. The winner of the most voted list for the municipal council is automatically elected mayor, similar to first-past-the-post (FPTP). The lists are closed and the seats in each municipality are apportioned according to the D'Hondt method.

=== By-elections (1976–1979) ===
During the normal three-year term of local governments, three municipal council by-elections were held: In the municipality of Mirandela on 10 September 1978; In the municipalities of Valença and Belmonte both on 29 April 1979, adding to this, thirty-three parishes also held a by-election for parish assemblies.

City control in by-elections (1976–1979)
Date	Municipality	Population	Previous control	New control
10 September 1978	Mirandela	24,139	Democratic and Social Center (CDS)	Social Democratic Party (PSD)
29 April 1979	Belmonte	6,522	Socialist Party (PS)	Socialist Party (PS)
29 April 1979	Valença	12,850	Socialist Party (PS)	Democratic Union (UD)

== Parties ==
The main political forces involved in the election were:

- Democratic Alliance (AD) (only in some municipalities)
- Democratic and Social Center (CDS) (only in some municipalities)
- Socialist Party (PS)
- Social Democratic Party (PSD) (only in some municipalities)
- United People Alliance (APU)

== Results ==
=== Municipal Councils ===
==== National summary of votes and seats ====
Summary of the 16 December 1979 Municipal Councils elections results
Parties	Votes	%	±pp swing	Candidacies	Councillors		Mayors	
Parties	Votes	%	±pp swing	Candidacies	Total	±	Total	±
Socialist	1,380,134	27.67	▼5.3	297	523	▼168	60	▼55
Democratic Alliance	1,272,058	25.50	—	138	436	—	73	—
United People Alliance^{[A]}	1,021,486	20.48	▲2.8	299	322	▲55	50	▲13
Social Democratic	733,384	14.70	▼9.6	156	480	▼143	101	▼14
Democratic and Social Centre	344,902	6.92	▼9.7	103	165	▼152	20	▼16
Popular Democratic Union	64,355	1.29	—	96	3	—	0	—
Portuguese Workers' Communist	24,456	0.49	▼0.2	69	0	0	0	0
Christian Democratic	6,616	0.13	—	9	2	—	0	—
People's Monarchist	6,162	0.12	▼0.1	3	6	▲3	1	0
UEDS	1,873	0.04	—	7	0	—	0	—
Workers Party of Socialist Unity	273	0.01	—	2	0	—	0	—
**Total valid**	**4,855,699**	**97.36**	**▲1.8**	—	**1,937**	**▲31**	**305**	**▲1**
Blank ballots	51,584	1.03	▼1.1					
Invalid ballots	80,451	1.61	▼0.6					
**Total**	**4,987,734**	**100.00**						
Registered voters/turnout	6,761,751	73.76	▲9.2					
**^{A}** In 1976, as Electoral Front United People.

==== Municipality map ====
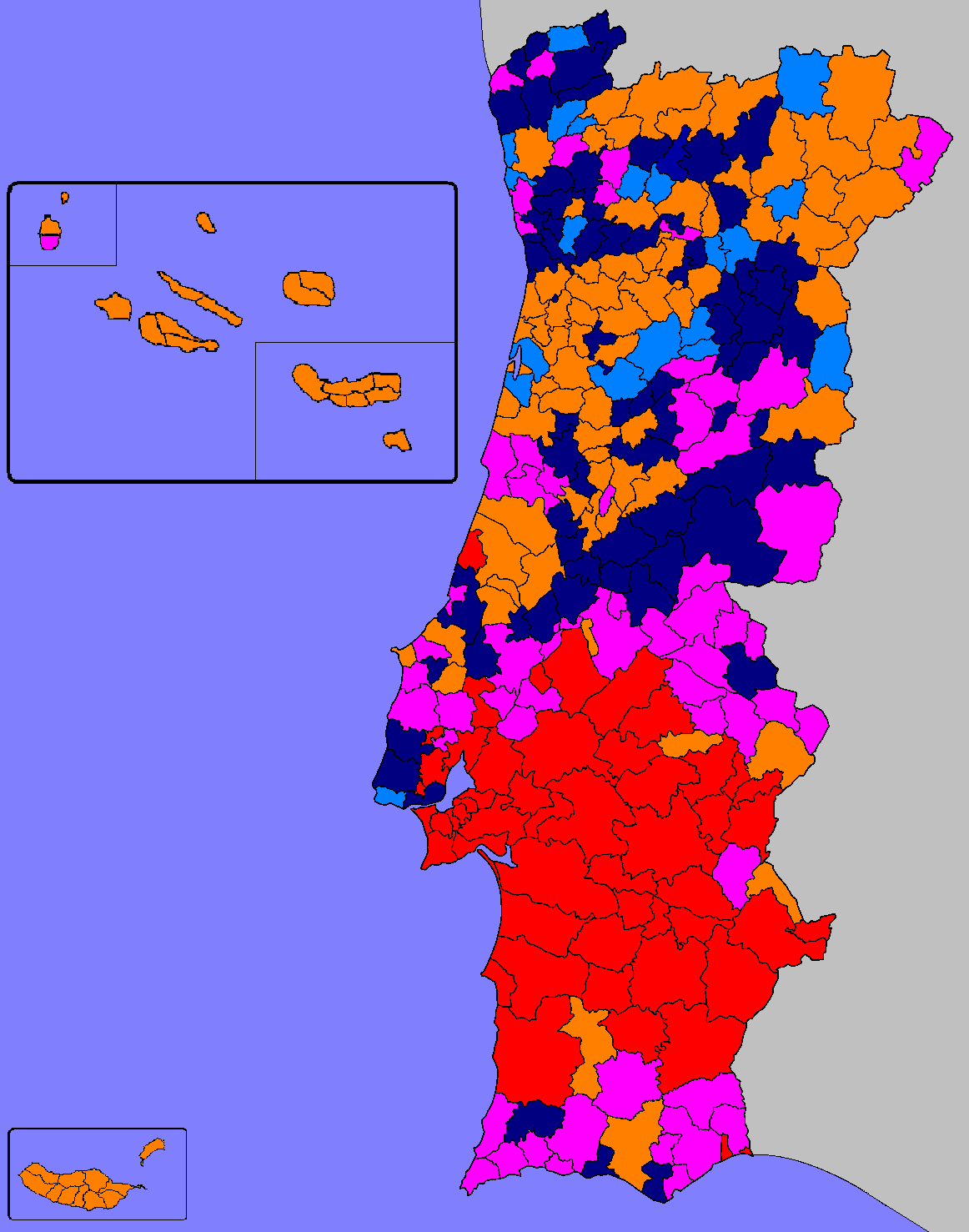
Most voted parties or coalitions in each Municipality. Municipalities won by: ■ - PS: 60 ■ - AD: 73 ■ - APU: 50 ■ - PSD: 101 ■ - CDS: 20 ■ - PPM: 1

==== City control ====
The following table lists party control in all district capitals, highlighted in bold, as well as in municipalities above 100,000 inhabitants. Population estimates from the 1970 Census.

Municipality	Population	Previous control	New control
Almada	107,575	United People Alliance (APU)	United People Alliance (APU)
Amadora	111,929	Municipality created	United People Alliance (APU)
**Aveiro**	49,808	Democratic and Social Centre (CDS)	Democratic and Social Centre (CDS)
**Beja**	36,384	United People Alliance (APU)	United People Alliance (APU)
**Braga**	96,918	Socialist Party (PS)	Socialist Party (PS)
**Bragança**	33,070	Social Democratic Party (PSD)	Social Democratic Party (PSD)
Cascais	92,907	Socialist Party (PS)	Democratic and Social Centre (CDS)
**Castelo Branco**	55,195	Socialist Party (PS)	Democratic Alliance (AD)
**Coimbra**	110,553	Socialist Party (PS)	Democratic Alliance (AD)
**Évora**	47,244	United People Alliance (APU)	United People Alliance (APU)
**Faro**	30,973	Socialist Party (PS)	Democratic Alliance (AD)
**Funchal**	101,810	Social Democratic Party (PSD)	Social Democratic Party (PSD)
Gondomar	105,075	Socialist Party (PS)	Democratic Alliance (AD)
**Guarda**	39,741	Socialist Party (PS)	Socialist Party (PS)
Guimarães	122,719	Socialist Party (PS)	Democratic Alliance (AD)
**Leiria**	80,241	Social Democratic Party (PSD)	Social Democratic Party (PSD)
**Lisbon**	769,044	Socialist Party (PS)	Democratic Alliance (AD)
Loures	166,167	Socialist Party (PS)	United People Alliance (APU)
Matosinhos	109,225	Socialist Party (PS)	Socialist Party (PS)
Oeiras	180,194	Socialist Party (PS)	Democratic Alliance (AD)
**Ponta Delgada**	67,975	Social Democratic Party (PSD)	Social Democratic Party (PSD)
**Portalegre**	25,800	Socialist Party (PS)	Democratic Alliance (AD)
**Porto**	301,655	Socialist Party (PS)	Democratic Alliance (AD)
**Santarém**	56,440	Socialist Party (PS)	Socialist Party (PS)
**Setúbal**	65,230	Socialist Party (PS)	United People Alliance (APU)
Sintra	124,893	Socialist Party (PS)	Democratic Alliance (AD)
**Viana do Castelo**	70,455	Social Democratic Party (PSD)	Democratic Alliance (AD)
Vila Nova de Gaia	180,875	Socialist Party (PS)	Democratic Alliance (AD)
**Vila Real**	44,550	Social Democratic Party (PSD)	Social Democratic Party (PSD)
**Viseu**	73,010	Democratic and Social Centre (CDS)	Democratic and Social Centre (CDS)

=== Municipal Assemblies ===
==== National summary of votes and seats ====
Summary of the 16 December 1979 Municipal Assemblies elections results
Parties	Votes	%	±pp swing	Candidacies	Mandates	
Parties	Votes	%	±pp swing	Candidacies	Total	±
Socialist	1,358,977	27.24	▼6.1		2,748	▲1,047
Democratic Alliance	1,284,634	25.75	—		2,186	—
United People Alliance^{[A]}	1,041,985	20.89	▲2.8		1,785	▲1,111
Social Democratic	754,318	15.12	▼9.4		2,256	▲597
Democratic and Social Centre	316,568	6.35	▼10.1		863	▼185
Popular Democratic Union	68,254	1.37	—		59	—
Portuguese Workers' Communist	13,490	0.27	▲0.2		0	0
People's Monarchist	5,514	0.11	▼0.0		26	▲24
UEDS	757	0.02	—		3	—
Christian Democratic	421	0.00	▼0.0		0	0
**Total valid**	**4,844,918**	**97.13**	**▲1.9**	—	**9,926**	**▲4,796**
Blank ballots	67,042	1.34	▼1.2			
Invalid ballots	76,283	1.53	▼0.7			
**Total**	**4,988,243**	**100.00**				
Registered voters/turnout	6,761,751	73.77	▲9.2			
**^{A}** In 1976, as Electoral Front United People.

=== Parish Assemblies ===
==== National summary of votes and seats ====
Summary of the 16 December 1979 Parish Assemblies elections results
Parties	Votes	%	±pp swing	Candidacies	Mandates		Presidents	
Parties	Votes	%	±pp swing	Candidacies	Total	±	Total	±
Socialist	1,345,048	27.19	▼6.0		10,948	▲2,584	813	▼291
Democratic Alliance	1,237,506	25.01	—		10,371	—	1,044	—
United People Alliance^{[A]}	1,033,733	20.90	▲5.2		5,072	▲2,744	299	▲102
Social Democratic	757,338	15.31	▼9.2		9,631	▲577	1,062	▼193
Democratic and Social Centre	318,990	6.45	▼8.8		4,260	▼826	390	▼143
Popular Democratic Union	49,595	1.00	—		56	—	1	—
Independents	48,397	0.98	▼3.0		697	▼519	75	▼55
Portuguese Workers' Communist	8,811	0.18	▼0.1		3	▲1	0	0
People's Monarchist	4,953	0.10	▲0.1		78	▲66	8	▲7
Christian Democratic	2,347	0.05	—		25	—	1	—
Workers Party of Socialist Unity	917	0.02	—		1	—	0	—
UEDS	605	0.01	—		2	—	0	—
Movement of Socialist Left	0	0.00	—		0	—	0	—
**Total valid**	**4,808,240**	**97.19**	**▲1.8**	—	**41,144**	**▲14,876**	**3,693**	**▲471**
Blank ballots	60,144	1.22	▼1.0					
Invalid ballots	78,674	1.59	▼0.8					
**Total**	**4,947,058**	**100.00**						
Registered voters/turnout	6,706,791	73.76	▲9.2					
**^{A}** In 1976, as Electoral Front United People.

=== Maps ===
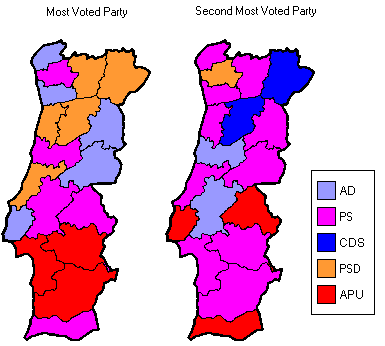
The first and the second most voted parties in Municipal Councils in each district. (Azores and Madeira are not shown)

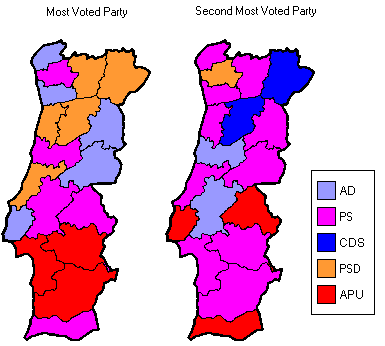
The first and the second most voted parties in Municipal Assemblies in each district. (Azores and Madeira are not shown)

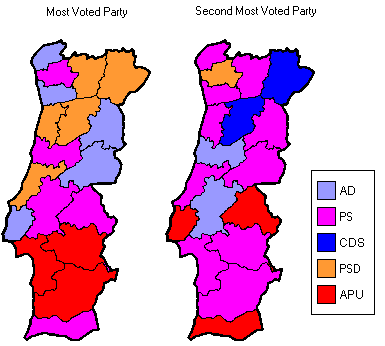
The first and the second most voted parties in Parish Assemblies in each district. (Azores and Madeira are not shown)

== Notes ==
- Democratic Alliance (AD) was composed by the Democratic Social Center (CDS), the Social Democratic Party (PSD) and the People's Monarchist Party (PPM).
- Although the PSD, the CDS and the PPM were united in the Democratic Alliance, they appear in the scorecard because they ran separated in several municipalities.
- United People Alliance (APU) was composed by the Portuguese Communist Party (PCP) and the Portuguese Democratic Movement (MDP/CDE).
- The number of candidacies expresses the number of municipalities or parishes in which the party or coalition presented lists.
- The number of mandates expresses the number of municipal deputies in the Municipal Assembly election and the number of parish deputies in the Parish Assembly election.
- The turnout varies because one may choose not to vote for all the organs.

== See also ==
- Politics of Portugal
- List of political parties in Portugal
- Elections in Portugal
