= United People Alliance =

United People Alliance Aliança Povo Unido
- Leader: Álvaro Cunhal
- Founded: 14 April 1978
- Dissolved: 1987
- Preceded by: Electoral Front United People
- Succeeded by: Unitary Democratic Coalition
- Ideology: Communism; Marxism–Leninism; Green politics Eco-socialism
- Colours: Red; Green
- Member parties: Portuguese Communist Party; Portuguese Democratic Movement; Ecologist Party "The Greens"

The United People Alliance (Portuguese: Aliança Povo Unido or APU) was an electoral and political coalition between the Portuguese Communist Party (PCP) and the Portuguese Democratic Movement (MDP-CDE). After 1983, the Ecologist Party "The Greens" also joined.

The coalition was formed in 1978 in order to run for the next legislative election and split up after the breakaway and implosion of the MDP-CDE in 1987. After that, the PCP started to run in coalition with the Ecologist Party "The Greens" in the Democratic Unity Coalition.

== Electoral results achieved by APU ==
=== Assembly of the Republic ===
Election	Assembly of the Republic					Government	Size	Notes
Election	Votes	%	±pp	Seats won	+/−	Government	Size	Notes
1979	1,121,374	19.0%	▲4.61	47 / 250	▲7	Opposition	3rd	New coalition. Variation in votes and seats from PCP.
1980	1,000,975	17.0%	▼2.0	41 / 250	▼6	Opposition	3rd	
1983	1,024,475	18.2%	▲1.2	44 / 250	▲3	Opposition	3rd	
1985	893,216	15.6%	▼2.6	38 / 250	▼6	Opposition	4th	

=== Local elections ===
Election	Local elections					Size	Notes
Election	Votes	%	±pp	Seats won	+/	Size	Notes
1979	1,021,486	20.5%	▲2.8	316 / 1,900	▲48	3rd	New coalition. Variation in votes and seats from FEPU.
1982	1,061,492	20.7%	▲0.2	316 / 1,909	0	2nd	
1985	942,147	19.4%	▼1.3	303 / 1,975	▼3	3rd	
