= Republican and Socialist Front =

Republican and Socialist Front Frente Republicana e Socialista
- Abbreviation: FRS
- Founded: 1 August 1980
- Dissolved: 1982
- Ideology: Democratic socialism Social democracy
- Political position: Left-wing
- Colours: Red, Pink
- Member parties: Socialist Party; Leftwing Union for the Socialist Democracy; Independent Social Democratic Action

Electoral poster.

Republican and Socialist Front (Portuguese: Frente Republicana e Socialista, FRS) was an electoral alliance in Portugal, consisting of the Socialist Party (PS), Leftwing Union for the Socialist Democracy (UEDS) and Independent Social Democratic Action (ASDI). FRS was officially established on 10 June 1980 and it contested the 1980 elections. It dissolved in 1982 when PS decided to form a coalition with PSD.

== Background ==
After the Carnation Revolution and the 1976 Portuguese legislative election, the Socialist Party formed two governments (the second in coalition with CDS – People's Party) that failed to reach the end of their term. President António Ramalho Eanes would then nominate various governments, the second of which was led by Carlos Mota Pinto. Mota Pinto was supported by some members of the Social Democratic Party (PSD), but their leader at the time, Francisco de Sá Carneiro, did not allow PSD to formally support Mota Pinto and would later cut ties with PS and go on to form the Democratic Alliance (AD). The PSD members that were not satisfied with Sá Carneiro's decision to go forward with this right-wing coalition would, in January 1978, leave and form the Independent Social Democratic Action (ASDI).

Also in January 1978, the Socialist Culture Association "Worker's Fraternity" and some independent socialists organized the Leftwing Socialist Democracy Convention, thus creating the Leftwing Union for the Socialist Democracy (UEDS).

These two forces, together with PS, would form a coalition in August 1980 that was legally recognized on 10 June 1980.

== Members of the Republican and Socialist Front ==
- Socialist Party, (PS)
- Leftwing Union for the Socialist Democracy, (UEDS)
- Independent Social Democratic Action, (ASDI)

== Election results ==
Election	Assembly of the Republic			Government	Size	Source
Election	Votes	%	Seats won	Government	Size	Source
1980	1,606,198	26.7%	71 / 250	Opposition	2nd	
