= António de Sousa Franco =

Portuguese economist and politician

António de Sousa Franco GCC GCSE
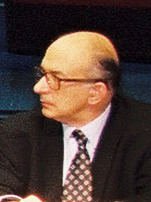
- Sousa Franco in 1998

Minister of Finance
- In office 18 October 1995 – 25 October 1999
- Prime Minister: António Guterres
- Preceded by: Eduardo Catroga
- Succeeded by: Joaquim Pina Moura
- In office 1 August 1979 – 17 December 1979
- Prime Minister: Maria de Lourdes Pintasilgo
- Preceded by: Manuel Jacinto Nunes
- Succeeded by: Aníbal Cavaco Silva

President of the Social Democratic Party
- In office 11 November 1977 – 15 April 1978
- Secretary-General: Joaquim Magalhães Mota; José Sérvulo Correia
- Preceded by: Francisco Sá Carneiro
- Succeeded by: José Menéres Pimentel

Personal details
- Born: António Luciano Pacheco de Sousa Franco; 21 September 1942 Oeiras, Portugal
- Died: 9 June 2004 (aged 61) Matosinhos, Portugal
- Party: Independent (1985–2004); Independent Social Democratic Action (1980–1985); Social Democratic Party (1974–1980)
- Spouse: Matilde Magalhães Figueiredo
- Education: University of Lisbon
- Profession: Economist

António Luciano Pacheco de Sousa Franco, GCC, GCSE (Oeiras, September 21, 1942 – Matosinhos, June 9, 2004) was a Portuguese economist and politician.

== Background ==
He was a son of António de Sousa Franco and wife Maria de Jesus Pacheco, in turn sister of Óscar Pacheco (Setúbal, São Julião, August 10, 1904 – February 17, 1970), Isabel Pacheco and Clóvis Pacheco and daughter of Joaquim Pacheco, born in Setúbal, and wife Deolinda Baptista.

== Career ==
He was a Licentiate, Doctorate and Full Professor of Law from the Faculty of Law of the University of Lisbon. He was President of the Directive Council of his Faculty.

He joined the Popular Democratic Party in 1974, who adopted the name of Social Democratic Party in 1976. Between 1977 and 1978, he was the interim leader of the party, due to Francisco Sá Carneiro's absence. He later left the party and was Minister of Finance in the government of Maria de Lourdes Pintasilgo, in 1979.

In 1986, he took office as President of the Portuguese Court of Auditors (Tribunal de Contas). In the meantime, he had come closer to the Socialist Party. He was again Minister of Finance in the first socialist government of António Guterres, from 1995 to 1999.

He was critical of the socialists in the following years, but accepted to be the top candidate of the Socialist Party's list for the 2004 European Parliament election.

== Death ==
During a campaign event for the 2004 European election in a fishing facility in Matosinhos, Sousa Franco and his entourage were engulfed by a violent clash between members of two local factions of the Socialist Party. During the incident, Sousa Franco suffered a heart attack. He was rushed to the nearby Pedro Hispano Hospital, being pronounced dead shortly after arrival.

== Honours ==
He was awarded with the Grand Crosses of the Order of Christ and the Order of Saint James of the Sword.

== Family ==
He married in Coimbra, at the Old Cathedral, Maria Matilde Pessoa de Magalhães Figueiredo (b. Lisbon, São Domingos de Benfica, July 8, 1943), a Licentiate in History, daughter of João Correia de Magalhães Figueiredo, a decorated Portuguese Army Officer, and wife Carlota Matilde Sérgio Pessoa, a maternal niece of António Sérgio, without issue. She was previously married to António Manuel Delgado Tamagnini, a lawyer, by whom she had an only daughter, Inês Pessoa de Magalhães Figueiredo Tamagnini, unmarried and without issue. She is the sister of Eduardo Sérgio Pessoa de Magalhães Figueiredo, 2nd Baron of Costeira.
