= Independent Social Democratic Action =

Defunct social democratic party in Portugal

- Founded: 1979
- Legalized: 27 June 1980; 46 years ago
- Dissolved: 1985
- Split from: Social Democratic Party
- Merged into: Socialist Party
- Ideology: Social democracy Democratic socialism
- Political position: Center-left
- National affiliation: Republican and Socialist Front (1980–1983)

The Independent Social Democratic Action (Portuguese: Ação Social Democrata Independente) was a political party in Portugal, first founded as a parliamentary group in 1979, and then officially registered as a political party in June 1980. It was founded after several members of the Social Democratic Party (PSD), among them António Sousa Franco, Joaquim Magalhães Mota, Sérvulo Correia, Guilherme d'Oliveira Martins and António Marques Mendes, left the party in total disagreement with Sá Carneiro's strategy and ideological line.

The party contested the 1980 legislative election with the Socialist Party, being a part of the Republican and Socialist Front, that also included the Left-wing Union for the Socialist Democracy.

The party ended up being dissolved in 1985 and most of its members joined to the Socialist Party.
