= Democratic Alliance (Portugal, 1979) =

Democratic Alliance Aliança Democrática
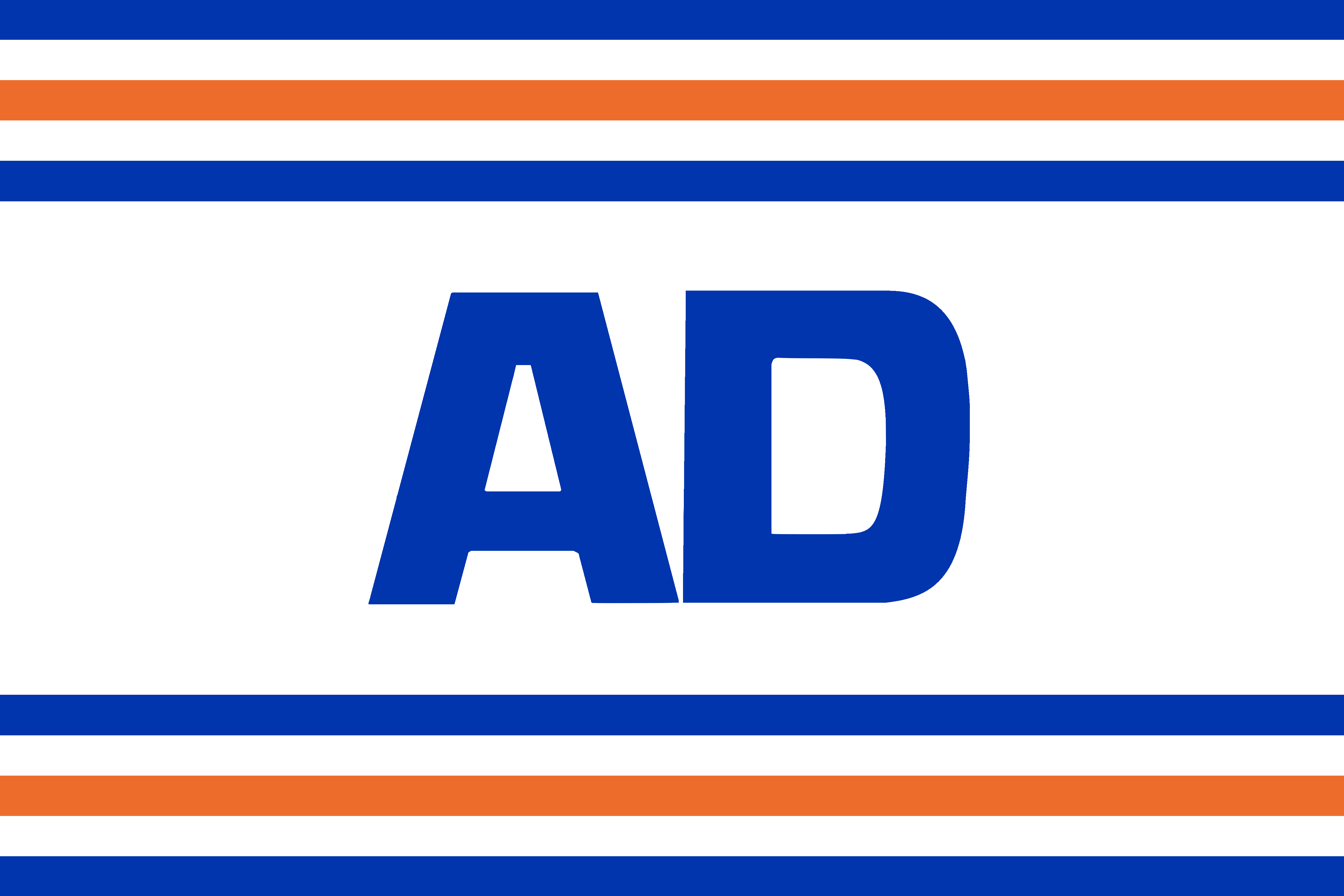
- Abbreviation: AD
- Founded: 5 July 1979
- Dissolved: 1983
- Ideology: Conservatism; Christian democracy
- Political position: Centre-right
- International affiliation: List: Iberian links to UCD ‘Mesa Iberoamericana de Partidos Democráticos’ (Note: Only PSD and CDS, 8–11 November 1979, little de facto existence) 'Reunión Iberoamericana de Partidos de Centro Derecha' (Note: 9 November 1979 to 1981, little de facto existence)
- Colours: Blue, Orange

Election symbol
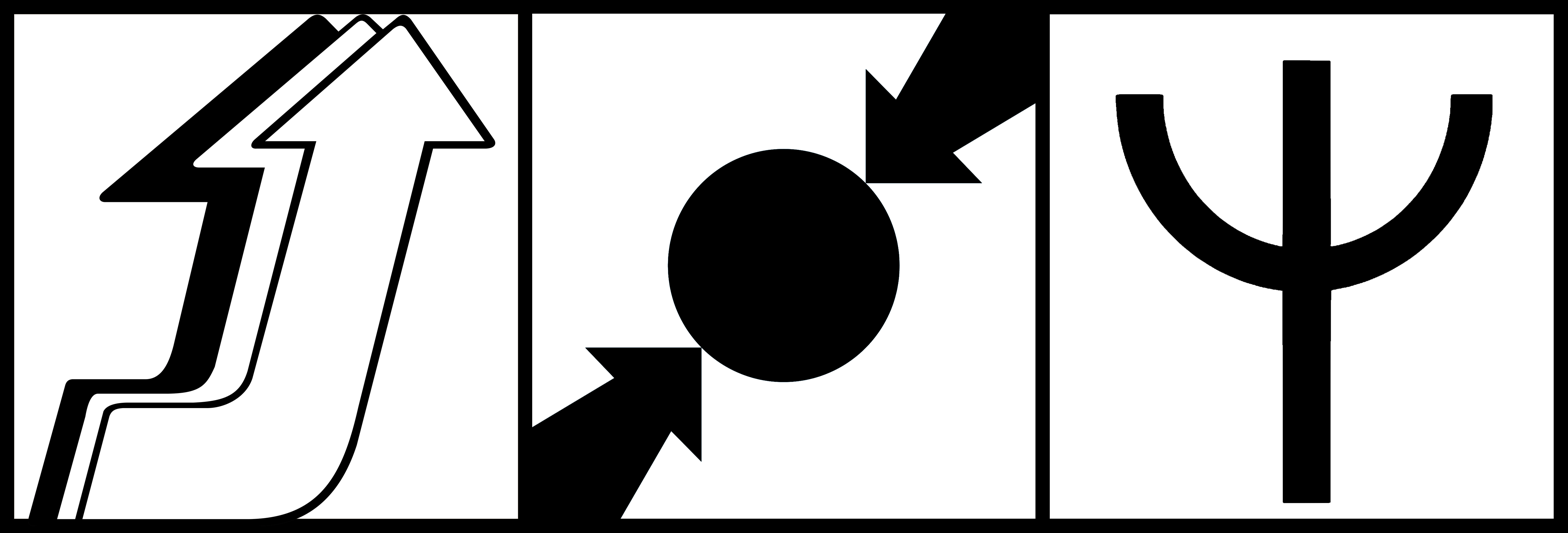

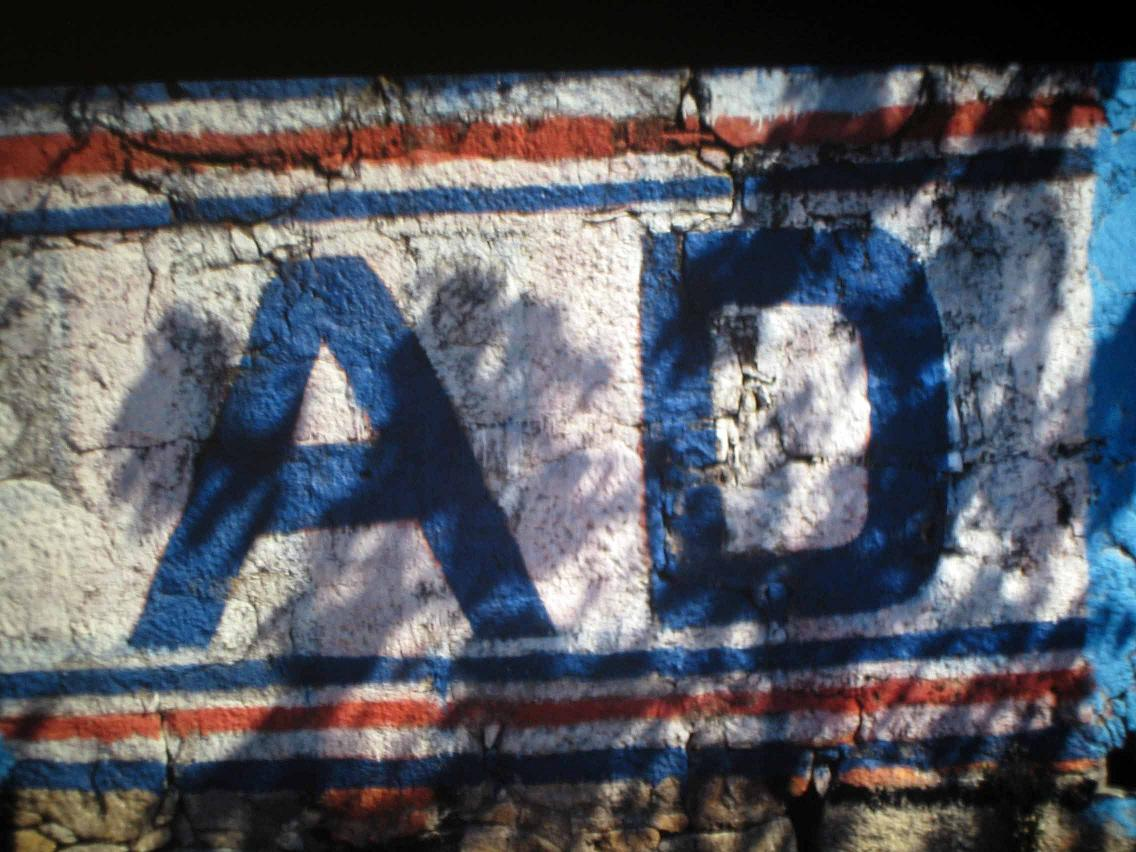
AD - Democratic Alliance, mural painting

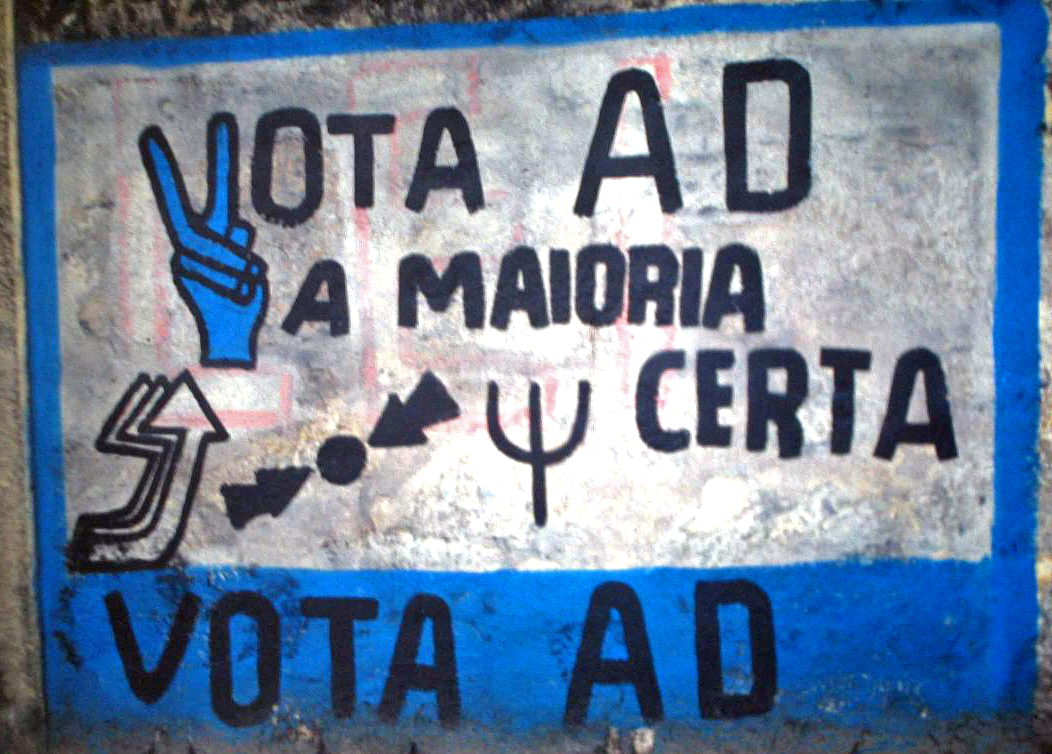
Vote AD - The Right Majority, mural painting

The Democratic Alliance (Portuguese: Aliança Democrática, AD) was a centre-right political alliance, in Portugal composed of the Social Democratic Party (PSD), CDS – People's Party (CDS–PP) and the People's Monarchist Party (PPM). It existed between 1979 and 1983, and was refounded for the 2024 legislative election. After its first official dissolution, the coalition was continued to operated in local elections after 1989 and presented lists across the country in every single local election after 2001.

In the first creation, the alliance was composed of the Social Democratic Party (PSD), the Democratic and Social Centre (CDS) and the People's Monarchist Party (PPM), including also a group of dissidents of the right wing of the Socialist Party (PS) who were disappointed by the previous Soares government, called The Reformers, including José Medeiros Ferreira (who would later rejoin the PS), António Barreto (who remained a more or less centre/rightwing aligned independent) and Francisco Sousa Tavares (who joined the Social Democratic Party afterwards). The coalition was first formed in 1979 in order to run to the December 1979 legislative election.

The alliance was led by Francisco Sá Carneiro and Freitas do Amaral, and won the 1979 and 1980 legislative elections, which led to Sá Carneiro becoming Prime Minister of Portugal, but lost the presidential election of 1980 to the independent candidate António Ramalho Eanes.

After the death of Sá Carneiro on 4 December 1980, the coalition was unable to find a leader with his charisma. Francisco Pinto Balsemão, the incoming PSD leader, became Prime Minister, but was unable to consolidate the support enjoyed by his predecessor. After its defeat in the 1982 local elections, it was disbanded in 1983.

The name was revived for a similar alliance between the PSD, CDS-PP, and PPM ahead of the 2024 legislative election.

== Members of the Democratic Alliance ==
- Social Democratic Party (PPD/PSD)
- Democratic and Social Centre (CDS)
- People's Monarchist Party (PPM)
- The Reformers

== Leaders ==
- Francisco Sá Carneiro : 1979 – 1980
- Diogo Freitas do Amaral (interim) : 1980 – 1981
- Francisco Pinto Balsemão : 1981 – 1983

== Election results ==
=== Assembly of the Republic ===
Election	Leader	Votes	%	Seats	+/−	Government
1979	Francisco Sá Carneiro	2,719,208	45.3 (#1)	128 / 250	New	Majority
1980	Francisco Sá Carneiro	2,868,076	47.6 (#1)	134 / 250	▲6	Majority

=== Presidential elections ===
Election	Candidate	1st round	
Election	Candidate	Votes	%
1980	António Soares Carneiro	2,325,481	40.2 (#2)

=== Local elections ===
Between 1979 and 1983

Election	Votes	%	Councillors	+/-	Mayors	+/-	Assemblies	+/-	Parishes	+/-
1979	1,044,642	23.5 (#2)	426 / 1,900	New	73 / 305	New	2,122 / 9,703	New	9,785 / 40,110	New
1982	988,347	19.9 (#3)	322 / 1,909	▼104	49 / 305	▼24	1,625 / 9,897	▼497	7,684 / 41,636	▼2101

== Second Democratic Alliance ==
After the 2022 legislative election and for the first time in history, CDS–PP failed to win any seats and was wiped out of parliament. In December 2023, Luís Montenegro and Nuno Melo announced a coalition for the 2024 legislative and European Parliament elections, including the Social Democratic Party (PPD/PSD), the CDS – People's Party (CDS–PP) and some independent politicians under the name Democratic Alliance (AD). At first, the People's Monarchist Party (PPM) refused to join the alliance, citing the "weakness" and "lack of vision" of its leaders, but they later went back with their position and joined the coalition. The agreement for the coalition was signed on 7 January 2024 between Luís Montenegro, Nuno Melo and Gonçalo da Câmara Pereira, with Miguel Guimarães representing the independents that are also present in the coalition.

This coalition granted CDS–PP two easily eligible seats and four potentially eligible seats, while it also granted one possibly eligible seat to the PPM. The coalition was also revived for the 2024 Azorean regional election.

=== Assembly of the Republic ===
Election	Leader	Votes	%	Seats	Government
2022 (Note: Only in the Azores.)	Paulo Moniz	28,330	33.9 (#2)	2 / 5	Opposition

=== Presidential elections ===
Election	Candidate	1st round	
Election	Candidate	Votes	%
2016	Marcelo Rebelo de Sousa	2,413,956	52.0 (#1)

=== Local elections ===
After 1983 (Only in contests where PSD, CDS-PP and PPM ran in a joint coalition.)

Election	Votes	%	Councillors	+/-	Mayors	+/-	Assemblies	+/-	Parishes	+/-
1989	193,161	3.9 (#5)	13 / 2,002	New	1 / 305	New	41 / 6,753	New	403 / 33,000	New
2001	67,094	1.3 (#9)	10 / 2,044	▼3	1 / 308	0	40 / 6,876	▼1	302 / 34,569	▼101
2005	91,455	1.7 (#8)	20 / 2,046	▲10	1 / 308	0	73 / 6,885	▲33	400 / 34,498	▲98
2009	99,811	1.8 (#9)	17 / 2,078	▼3	1 / 308	0	60 / 6,946	▼13	405 / 34,672	▲5
2013	94,015	1.9 (#9)	21 / 2,086	▲4	2 / 308	▲1	72 / 6,487	▲12	453 / 27,167	▲48
2017	75,192	1.5 (#9)	15 / 2,074	▼6	2 / 308	0	42 / 6,461	▼30	250 / 27,005	▼203
2021	70,904	1.4 (#11)	32 / 2,064	▲15	3 / 308	▲1	96 / 6,448	▲54	412 / 26,790	▲162
