= Francisco Sousa Tavares =

Portuguese lawyer, journalist and politician (1920–1993)

Francisco Sousa Tavares GCL

Minister of Quality of Life
- In office 23 June 1984 – 11 July 1985
- Prime Minister: Mário Soares
- Preceded by: António Capucho
- Succeeded by: Position abolished

Personal details
- Born: Francisco José de Sousa Tavares; 12 June 1920 Lisbon, Portugal
- Died: 25 May 1993 (aged 72) Lisbon, Portugal
- Party: Socialist Party (until 1979); Social Democratic Party (from 1981)
- Spouse(s): Sophia de Mello Breyner Andresen (m. 1946; div. 1988) Amélia Garcia Lagos (m. 1989)
- Children: 5, including Miguel Sousa Tavares
- Education: University of Lisbon

Francisco José de Sousa Tavares (12 June 1920 – 25 May 1993) was a Portuguese lawyer, journalist and politician. He served as Minister of Quality of Life in the IX Constitutional Government of Portugal, between 1984 and 1985. He is also remembered for his opposition to the Estado Novo regime, being actively involved in Humberto Delgado's 1958 campaign for the Portuguese presidency, and acting as defense lawyer for several political prisoners.
