= Left-wing Union for the Socialist Democracy =

Defunct socialist party in Portugal

Left-Wing Union for the Socialist Democracy
- Founder: António Lopes Cardoso
- Founded: 1978
- Dissolved: 1986
- Ideology: Socialism; Democratic socialism Workers' self-management
- Political position: Left-wing
- National affiliation: Republican and Socialist Front (1980–1983)

The Leftwing Union for the Socialist Democracy (Portuguese: União da Esquerda para a Democracia Socialista) was a Portuguese left-wing party founded in January 1978. The party has its origins in the Socialist Culture Association - Worker Brotherhood, a socialist organization and in groups of independent people linked to the Socialist Party.

The party participated in the legislative election of 1980 in coalition with the Socialist Party and the Independent Social Democratic Action in the Republican and Socialist Front. In the subsequent elections, the party's members integrated the lists of the Socialist Party. In the Presidential election of 1986 the UEDS members split, one part supporting Mário Soares and the other supporting Maria de Lurdes Pintasilgo.

The party was disbanded in 1986 and most of its members joined the Socialist Party, while others participated on the foundation of the Left Bloc.
