= 1997 Portuguese local elections =

- 14 December 1997

All 305 Portuguese municipalities and 4,260 Portuguese Parishes All 2,021 local government councils
- Turnout: 60.1% ▼3.3 pp
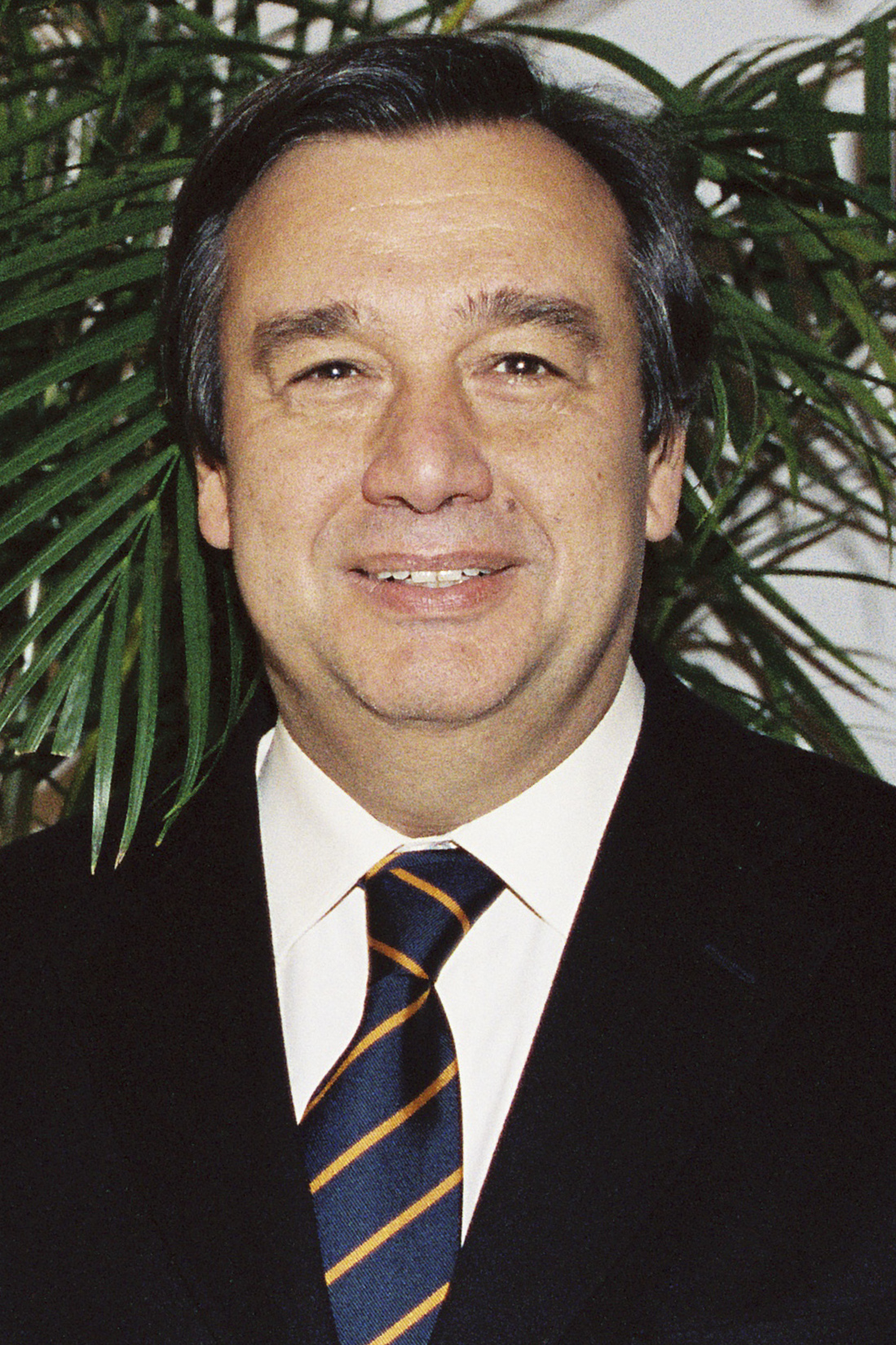

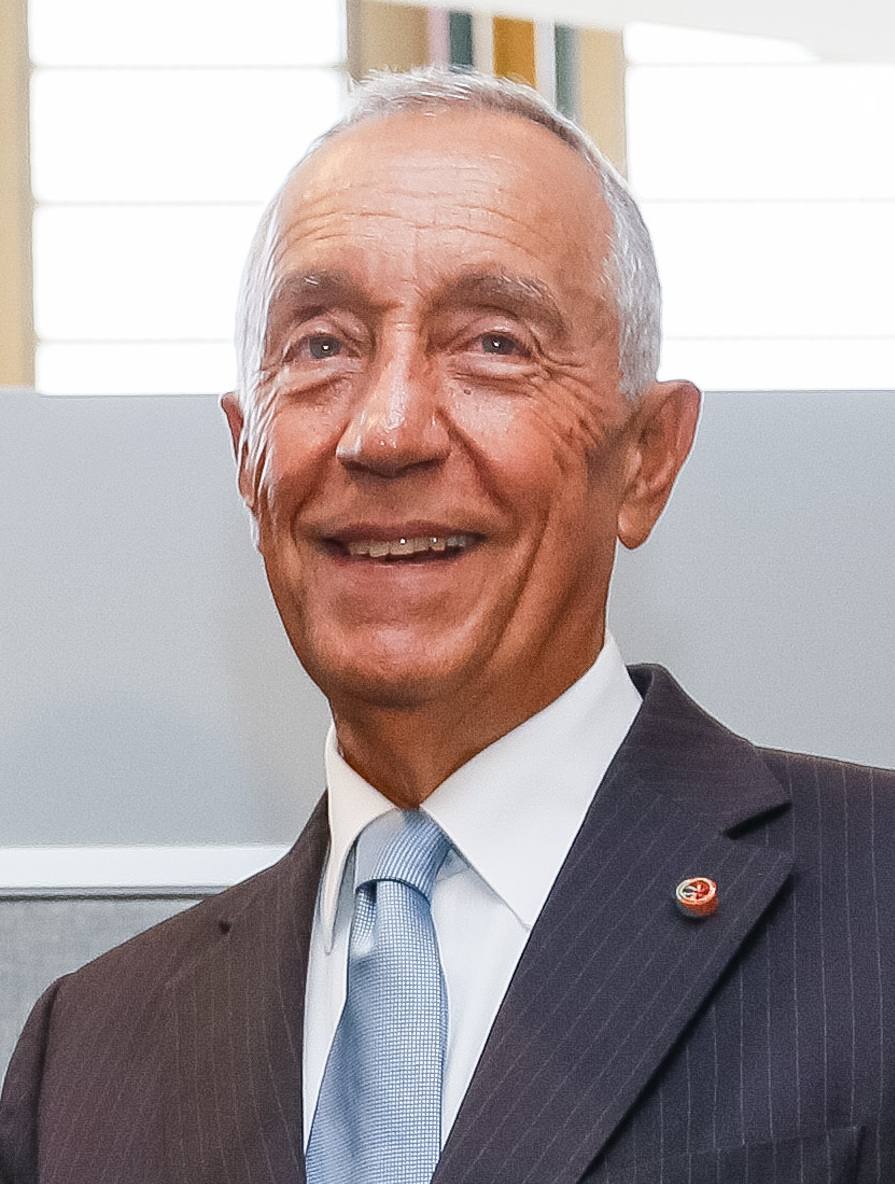

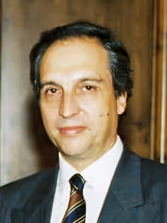

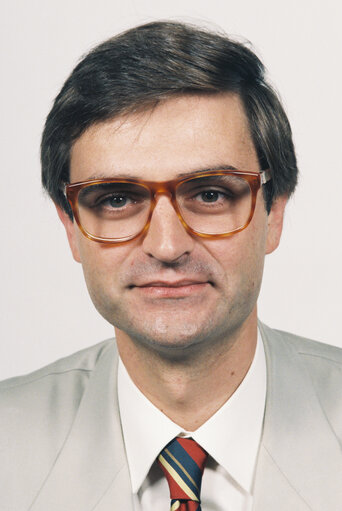
	First party	Second party
Leader	António Guterres	Marcelo Rebelo de Sousa
Party	PS	PSD
Last election	127 mayors, 40.2%	116 mayors, 33.7%
Popular vote	2,206,315	1,886,242
Percentage	41.2%	35.2%
Swing	▲1.1 pp	▲1.5 pp
Mayors	128	127
Mayors +/–	▲1	▲11
Councillors	879	810
Councillors +/–	▲57	▲3
	Third party	Fourth party
Leader	Carlos Carvalhas	Manuel Monteiro
Party	PCP	CDS
Alliance	CDU
Last election	49 mayors, 12.8%	13 mayors, 8.4%
Popular vote	643,956	302,763
Percentage	12.0%	6.3%
Swing	▼0.8 pp	▼2.1 pp
Mayors	41	8
Mayors +/–	▼8	▼5
Councillors	236	87
Councillors +/–	▼10	▼46

Local elections were held in Portugal on 14 December 1997. The elections consisted of three separate elections in the 305 Portuguese municipalities, the election for the Municipal Chambers, another election for the Municipal Assembly and a last one for the lower-level Parish Assembly, whose winner is elected parish president. This last was held separately in the more than 4,200 parishes around the country.

The Socialist Party (PS) remained the largest local political force, although only just, winning 128 cities, one more compared to 1993, and increasing their vote share to above 41 percent. In reality, PS and PSD basically tied in this elections, but the Socialists were able to hold on to big cities like Lisbon, Porto, Sintra and Coimbra. On the other hand, the PS lost some important cities to the PSD, particularly Vila Nova de Gaia and Figueira da Foz, the latter won by Pedro Santana Lopes, future Lisbon mayor and Prime Minister.

The Social Democratic Party (PSD) made some gains, winning 11 cities and basically catching up with the Socialists. They also increased their vote share to 35 percent. The PSD gained many cities from the PS, such as Bragança, Covilhã, Silves, Tavira and Alcobaça. Although the PSD didn't performed very strongly in the big urban centers, they performed extremely well in many medium and small cities across the country, but this same poor performance in large urban centers, such as Lisbon and Porto, generated criticism towards the leadership of Marcelo Rebelo de Sousa.

The election was quite bad for Democratic Unity Coalition (CDU), as they continued their fall in local politics. The Communist/Green coalition lost 8 cities and decreased their vote share to 12 percent. The CDU lost many of their bastions to the PS, such as Cuba, Amadora, Vila Franca de Xira and Sesimbra. They also saw a decrease in number of councillors, although here the fall was softer, as they lost just 10 councillors compared to 1993.

The People's Party (CDS–PP) also continued its decline in local politics. The party only won 8 cities, a fall of 5 cities, and dropped in vote share to the lowest level till that time, 5.7 percent. They lost cities like Aveiro to the PS, and Vila Verde to the PSD. One surprise in the elections was the victory of the People's Monarchist Party (PPM) in Penalva do Castelo, Viseu district, over the People's Party.

Turnout in these elections dropped in comparison with the 1993 election, as 60.1 percent of the electorate cast a ballot.

== Background ==
=== Electoral system ===
All 305 municipalities are allocated a certain number of councilors to elect corresponding to the number of registered voters in a given municipality. Each party or coalition must present a list of candidates. The winner of the most voted list for the municipal council is automatically elected mayor, similar to first-past-the-post (FPTP). The lists are closed and the seats in each municipality are apportioned according to the D'Hondt method.

=== By-elections (1993–1997) ===
During the normal four-year term of local governments, one municipal council by-election was held in the municipality of Albufeira on 21 January 1996, adding to this, fifteen parishes also held a by-election for parish assemblies.

City control in by-elections (1993–1997)
Date	Municipality	Population	Previous control	New control
21 January 1996	Albufeira	20,949	Socialist Party (PS)	Socialist Party (PS)

== Parties ==
The main political forces involved in the election were:

- CDS – People's Party (CDS–PP) (only in some municipalities)^{1},
- Unitary Democratic Coalition (CDU)^{2}
- Socialist Party (PS)^{2}
- Social Democratic Party (PSD) (only in some municipalities)^{1}
- People's Monarchist Party (PPM)

^{1} The PSD and the CDS–PP formed coalitions in some municipalities.
^{2} The PS formed a coalition with CDU and UDP in Lisbon.

== Results ==
=== Municipal Councils ===
==== National summary of votes and seats ====
Summary of the 14 December 1997 Municipal Councils elections results
Parties	Votes	%	±pp swing	Candidacies	Councillors		Mayors	
Parties	Votes	%	±pp swing	Candidacies	Total	±	Total	±
Socialist	2,041,307	38.07	▲2.0	303	869	▲74	127	▲1
Social Democratic	1,761,383	32.85	▼0.9	293	803	▼4	127	▲11
Democratic Unity Coalition	643,956	12.01	▼0.8	300	236	▼10	41	▼8
People's	302,763	5.65	▼2.8	252	83	▼50	8	▼5
PS / CDU / UDP	165,008	3.08	▼0.8	1	10	▼7	1	0
Social Democratic / People's	124,859	2.33	—	1	7	—	0	—
People's / Social Democratic	35,495	0.66	—	1	4	—	0	—
Popular Democratic Union	21,079	0.39	▲0.2	46	0	0	0	0
Portuguese Workers' Communist	18,674	0.35	▲0.1	22	0	0	0	0
PSR / Politics XXI	9,175	0.17	—	2	0	—	0	—
Revolutionary Socialist	9,126	0.17	—	16	0	—	0	—
People's Monarchist	7,129	0.13	▲0.1	5	5	▲5	1	▲1
Politics XXI	6,995	0.13	—	1	1	—	0	—
Christian Democratic	4,361	0.08	▲0.1	3	1	▲1	0	0
National Solidarity	2,301	0.04	▼0.5	12	0	▼3	0	0
Earth	1,884	0.04	▼0.4	1	2	0	0	0
Democratic Renewal	1,483	0.03	0.0	2	0	0	0	0
Democratic Party of the Atlantic	567	0.01	0.0	1	0	0	0	0
Left Revolutionary Front	120	0.00	—	1	0	—	0	—
**Total valid**	**5,157,665**	**96.18**	**▼0.4**	—	**2,021**	**▲10**	**305**	**0**
Blank ballots	117,360	2.19	▲0.3					
Invalid ballots	87,584	1.63	▲0.0					
**Total**	**5,362,609**	**100.00**						
Registered voters/turnout	8,922,182	60.10	▼3.3					

==== Municipality map ====
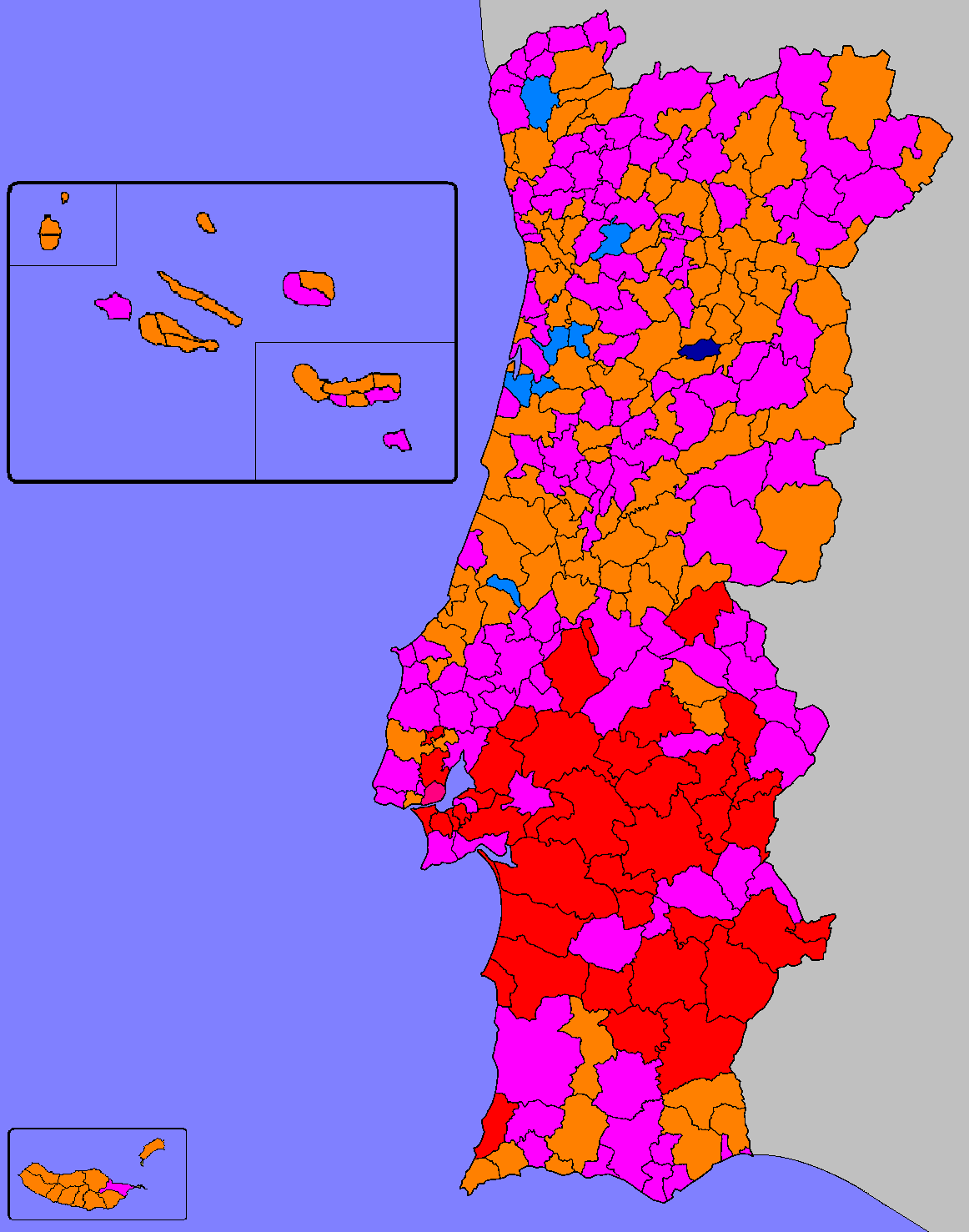
Most voted parties or coalitions in each Municipality. Municipalities won by: ■ - PSD: 127 ■ - PS: 128 ■ - CDU: 41 ■ - CDS–PP: 8 ■ - PPM: 1

==== City control ====
The following table lists party control in all district capitals, highlighted in bold, as well as in municipalities above 100,000 inhabitants. Population estimates from the 1991 Census.

Municipality	Population	Previous control	New control
Almada	151,783	Unitary Democratic Coalition (CDU)	Unitary Democratic Coalition (CDU)
Amadora	181,774	Unitary Democratic Coalition (CDU)	Socialist Party (PS)
**Aveiro**	66,444	CDS – People's Party (CDS–PP)	Socialist Party (PS)
Barcelos	111,733	Social Democratic Party (PSD)	Social Democratic Party (PSD)
**Beja**	35,827	Unitary Democratic Coalition (CDU)	Unitary Democratic Coalition (CDU)
**Braga**	141,256	Socialist Party (PS)	Socialist Party (PS)
**Bragança**	33,055	Socialist Party (PS)	Social Democratic Party (PSD)
Cascais	153,294	Socialist Party (PS)	Socialist Party (PS)
**Castelo Branco**	54,310	Social Democratic Party (PSD)	Socialist Party (PS)
**Coimbra**	139,052	Socialist Party (PS)	Socialist Party (PS)
**Évora**	53,754	Unitary Democratic Coalition (CDU)	Unitary Democratic Coalition (CDU)
**Faro**	50,761	Socialist Party (PS)	Socialist Party (PS)
**Funchal**	115,403	Social Democratic Party (PSD)	Social Democratic Party (PSD)
Gondomar	143,178	Social Democratic Party (PSD)	Social Democratic Party (PSD)
**Guarda**	38,765	Socialist Party (PS)	Socialist Party (PS)
Guimarães	157,589	Socialist Party (PS)	Socialist Party (PS)
**Leiria**	102,762	Social Democratic Party (PSD)	Social Democratic Party (PSD)
**Lisbon** (details)	663,394	PS / CDU / UDP	PS / CDU / UDP
Loures	322,158	Unitary Democratic Coalition (CDU)	Unitary Democratic Coalition (CDU)
Matosinhos	151,682	Socialist Party (PS)	Socialist Party (PS)
Oeiras	151,342	Social Democratic Party (PSD)	Social Democratic Party (PSD)
**Ponta Delgada**	61,989	Social Democratic Party (PSD)	Social Democratic Party (PSD)
**Portalegre**	26,111	Social Democratic Party (PSD)	Socialist Party (PS)
**Porto**	302,472	Socialist Party (PS)	Socialist Party (PS)
**Santarém**	62,621	Socialist Party (PS)	Socialist Party (PS)
Santa Maria da Feira	135,964	Social Democratic Party (PSD)	Social Democratic Party (PSD)
Santo Tirso	102,593	Socialist Party (PS)	Socialist Party (PS)
Seixal	116,912	Unitary Democratic Coalition (CDU)	Unitary Democratic Coalition (CDU)
**Setúbal**	103,634	Socialist Party (PS)	Socialist Party (PS)
Sintra	260,951	Socialist Party (PS)	Socialist Party (PS)
**Viana do Castelo**	83,095	Socialist Party (PS)	Socialist Party (PS)
Vila Franca de Xira	103,571	Unitary Democratic Coalition (CDU)	Socialist Party (PS)
Vila Nova de Famalicão	114,338	Socialist Party (PS)	Socialist Party (PS)
Vila Nova de Gaia	248,565	Socialist Party (PS)	Social Democratic Party (PSD)
**Vila Real**	46,300	Social Democratic Party (PSD)	Social Democratic Party (PSD)
**Viseu**	83,601	Social Democratic Party (PSD)	Social Democratic Party (PSD)

=== Municipal Assemblies ===
==== National summary of votes and seats ====
Summary of the 14 December 1997 Municipal Assemblies elections results
Parties	Votes	%	±pp swing	Candidacies	Mandates	
Parties	Votes	%	±pp swing	Candidacies	Total	±
Socialist	2,030,025	37.85	▲2.2		2,887	▲246
Social Democratic	1,633,778	30.46	▼3.4		2,579	▼102
Democratic Unity Coalition	668,896	12.47	▼0.6		798	▼5
People's	395,209	7.37	▼0.9		437	▼120
PS / CDU / UDP	163,411	3.05	▼0.7		30	▼2
Social Democratic / People's	124,472	2.32	—		22	—
People's / Social Democratic	42,321	0.79	—		13	—
Popular Democratic Union	25,552	0.48	▲0.3		2	0
Portuguese Workers' Communist	12,309	0.23	▲0.0		1	0
PSR / Politics XXI	11,150	0.21	—		1	—
Revolutionary Socialist	8,850	0.16	▼0.0		1	▲1
Politics XXI	6,483	0.12	—		8	—
People's Monarchist	6,008	0.11	▲0.1		16	▲16
Christian Democratic	4,254	0.08	—		5	—
National Solidarity	3,940	0.07	▼0.4		0	▼16
Earth	1,844	0.03	▼0.4		5	▼6
Democratic Renewal	1,341	0.03	0.0		2	0
Democratic Party of the Atlantic	576	0.01	—		0	—
**Total valid**	**5,140,419**	**95.83**	**▼0.5**	—	**6,807**	**▲15**
Blank ballots	135,738	2.53	▲0.5			
Invalid ballots	87,800	1.64	▲0.0			
**Total**	**5,363,957**	**100.00**				
Registered voters/turnout	8,921,343	60.12	▼3.3			

=== Parish Assemblies ===
==== National summary of votes and seats ====
Summary of the 14 December 1997 Parish Assemblies elections results
Parties	Votes	%	±pp swing	Candidacies	Mandates		Presidents	
Parties	Votes	%	±pp swing	Candidacies	Total	±	Total	±
Socialist	1,952,468	36.56	▲2.0		13,626	▲1,315	1,692	▲159
Social Democratic	1,615,100	30.24	▼3.4		12,960	▼719	1,597	▼64
Democratic Unity Coalition	661,254	12.38	▼0.9		2,731	▼16	280	▼36
People's	287,724	5.39	▼2.4		1,840	▼879	166	▼84
Social Democratic / People's	206,839	3.87	—		561	—	32	—
PS / CDU / UDP	169,893	3.18	▼0.7		408	▼119	40	▼18
Independents	148,097	2.77	▲0.5		1,557	▲322	196	▲47
People's / Social Democratic	43,267	0.81	—		77	—	2	—
Popular Democratic Union	16,116	0.30	▲0.2		6	▲4	0	0
People's Monarchist	5,501	0.10	▲0.1		80	▲78	10	▲10
Portuguese Workers' Communist	4,575	0.09	▲0.0		2	▲1	0	0
Politics XXI	3,958	0.07	—		37	—	3	—
Earth	3,162	0.06	▼0.2		39	▲1	2	0
Christian Democratic	2,598	0.05	—		8	—	0	—
National Solidarity	2,025	0.04	▼0.4		6	▼49	0	▼3
Democratic Renewal	1,549	0.03	0.0		9	▼1	0	▼1
Democratic Party of the Atlantic	395	0.01	—		3	—	0	—
Portuguese Party of Regions	394	0.01	—		3	—	1	—
Revolutionary Socialist	34	0.00	—		0	—	0	—
**Total valid**	**5,124,949**	**96.05**	**▼0.4**	—	**33,953**	**▲495**	**4,021**	**▲36**
Blank ballots	119,778	2.24	▲0.4					
Invalid ballots	96,014	1.80	▲0.1					
**Total**	**5,340,741**	**100.00**						
Registered voters/turnout	8,890,336	60.07	▼3.1					

== See also ==
- Politics of Portugal
- List of political parties in Portugal
- Elections in Portugal
