= Maria Amélia Santos =

Portuguese politician

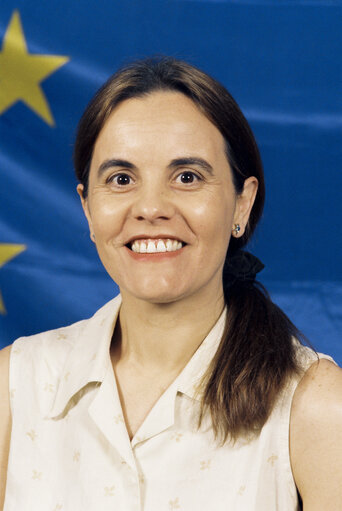
- Official portrait as an MEP, 1989

Member of the European Parliament
- In office 1989–1994
- Constituency: Portugal

Personal details
- Born: 25 August 1952 (age 73) Lisbon, Portugal
- Party: Unitary Democratic Coalition, Ecologist Party "The Greens", Socialist Party

Maria Amélia do Carmo Mota Santos (born 25 August 1952) is a Portuguese politician and academic. She served as a Member of the European Parliament from 1989 to 1994 and a member of the Assembly of the Republic from 1985 to 1989 and from 1999 to 2005.

Born in Lisbon, Portugal, she graduated from the University of Lisbon and earned a PhD in Institutional and Political History from NOVA University Lisbon. After graduating, she taught primary school in Lisbon and secondary school in Almada. Santos began her political career in 1985, winning a seat in the Assembly of the Republic in the 1985 Portuguese legislative election. She served as a member of the Unitary Democratic Coalition, an alliance between Ecologist Party "The Greens" and the Portuguese Communist Party. She was re-elected to the Assembly in 1987, and in the 1989 European Parliament election in Portugal she won one of the four seats the Unitary Democratic Coalition won.

As a member of the European Parliament, Santos was on the Committee on Development and Cooperation, and served as chair of The Green Group in the European Parliament until 1990. She originally served in parliament as a member of The Greens for Portugal, but left the party in 1991 and canvassed with the Group of the Party of European Socialists for the European Union; she remained politically independent in Portugal through the rest of her term. Santos did not run for re-election in 1994, but was re-elected to the Assembly as a member of the Socialist Party after the 1999 Portuguese legislative election, and served in that position until 2005. Currently, Santos works in the Ministry of Culture.
