= 1991 Portuguese legislative election =

Election

- 6 October 1991

All 230 seats in the Assembly of the Republic 116 seats needed for a majority
- Registered: 8,462,357 ▲6.7%
- Turnout: 5,735,431 (67.8%) ▼3.8 pp
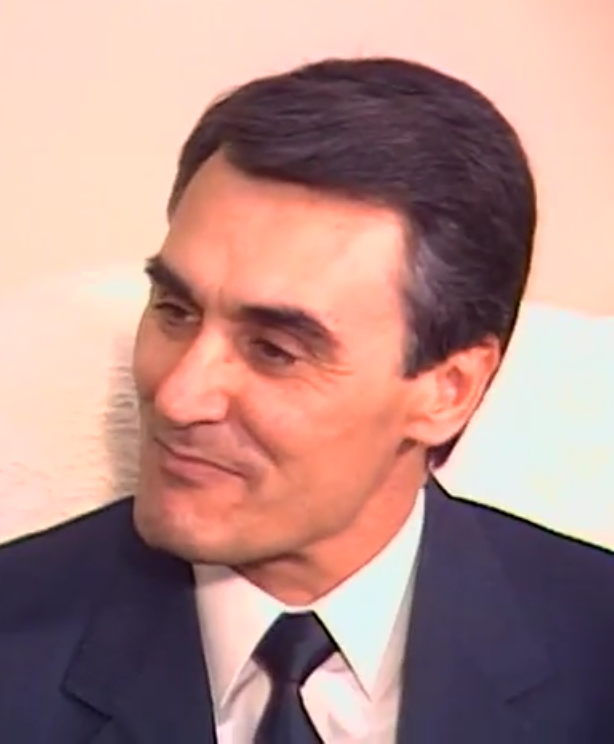

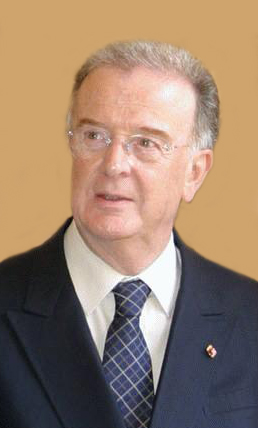

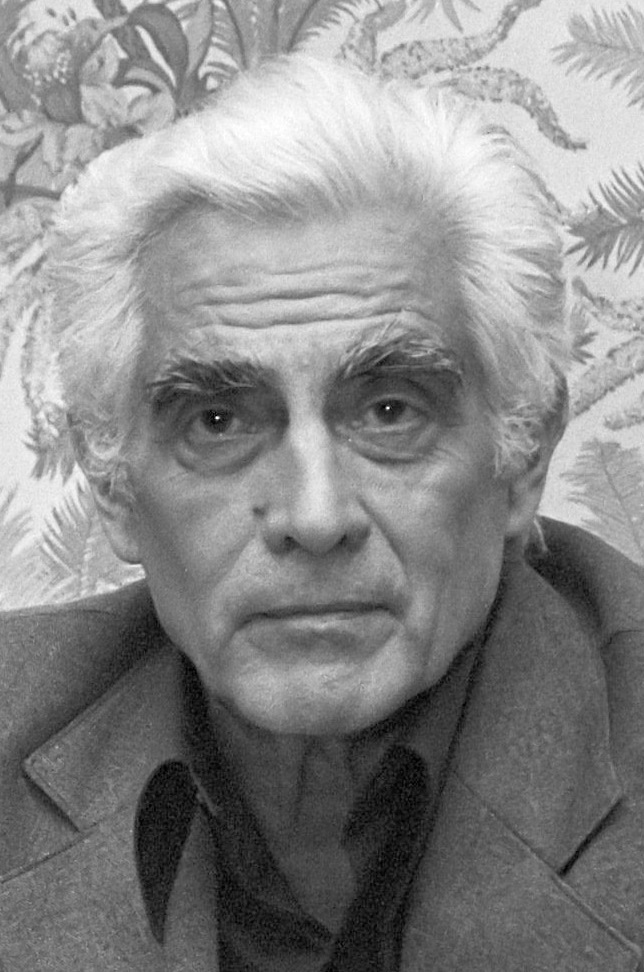

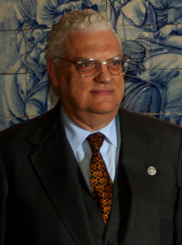

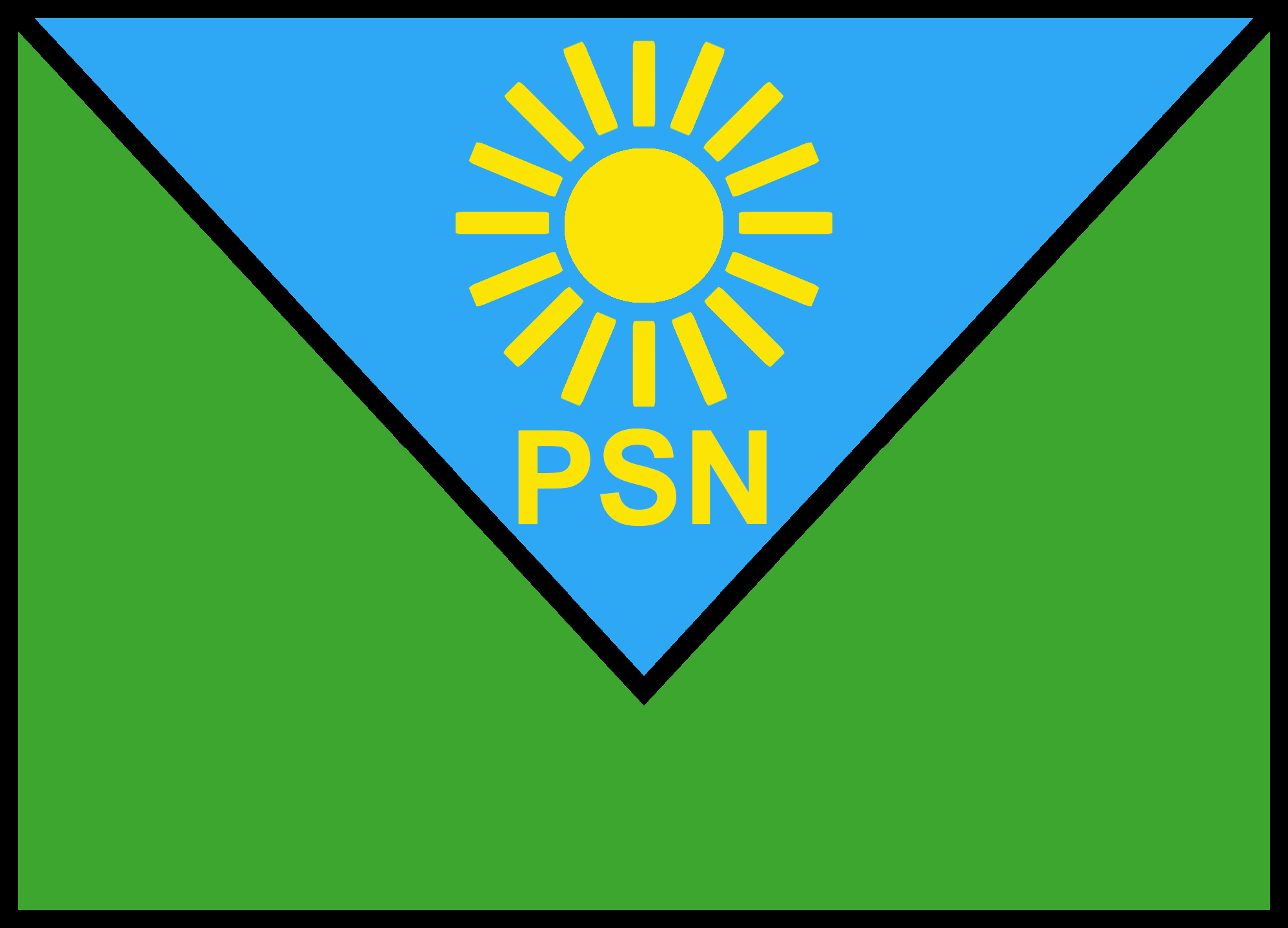
	First party	Second party	Third party
Leader	Aníbal Cavaco Silva	Jorge Sampaio	Álvaro Cunhal
Party	PSD	PS	PCP
Alliance			CDU
Leader since	2 June 1985	15 January 1989	30 September 1987
Leader's seat	Lisbon	Lisbon	Lisbon
Last election	148 seats, 50.2%	60 seats, 22.2%	31 seats, 12.1%
Seats before	138^{†}	56^{†}	26^{†}
Seats won	135	72	17
Seat change	▼3*	▲16*	▼9*
Popular vote	2,902,351	1,670,758	504,583
Percentage	50.6%	29.1%	8.8%
Swing	▲0.4 pp	▲6.9 pp	▼3.3 pp
	Fourth party	Fifth party
Leader	Diogo Freitas do Amaral	Manuel Sérgio
Party	CDS	PSN
Leader since	31 January 1988	26 June 1990
Leader's seat	Lisbon	Lisbon
Last election	4 seats, 4.4%	Did not contest
Seats before	4^{†}	—
Seats won	5	1
Seat change	▲1*	▲1
Popular vote	254,317	96,096
Percentage	4.4%	1.7%
Swing	▼0.0 pp	New party
Prime Minister before election
Aníbal Cavaco Silva
PSD
Prime Minister after election
Aníbal Cavaco Silva
PSD

The 1991 Portuguese legislative election took place on 6 October. The election renewed all 230 members of the Assembly of the Republic. There was a reduction of 20 seats compared with previous elections, due to the 1989 Constitutional revision. For the first time in Portuguese democracy, a government completed its full term, and elections were held after the end of the four-year legislature.

The Social Democratic Party, under the leadership of Cavaco Silva, won a historic third term and obtained an absolute majority for a second consecutive time. Although losing 13 seats due to the reduction in the total number from 250 to 230, the loss was only 3 seats if the results of the 1987 election are counted with the new seat distribution, while at the same time obtaining a higher percentage of votes than four years prior. Cavaco Silva became the first Prime Minister since Hintze Ribeiro, in 1904, to lead a party into three successive democratic election victories.

The Socialist Party, at the time led by Jorge Sampaio, the future President of Portugal, increased its share by 7 percentage points and gained 12 MPs, a gain of 16 if compared with the new seat distribution, but did not manage to avoid the renewal of the Social Democrats' absolute majority. Like four and six years earlier, and like 1979 and 1980, the PS failed to win a single district. In the first legislative election after the fall of the Eastern Bloc, the communist dominated Democratic Unity Coalition lost much of its electoral influence, losing almost 10 MPs and 3 percentage points, but were able to hold on to the district of Beja by a slight margin over the PSD.

On the right, the CDS could not recover its past influence, mainly to the effect of tactical voting for the Social Democratic Party by right-wing voters, increasing its parliamentary group by only 1 MP. The National Solidarity Party, using a populist campaign, achieved for the first time an MP, in what would be the only presence of such party in the Parliament.

Voter turnout fell to 67.8 percent, and for the first time below 70 percent of the electorate.

== Background ==
Cavaco Silva's second government was marked by strong economic and political reforms, such as the beginning of the reprivatization of many companies nationalized after the April 25th revolution, as well as the 1989 constitutional revision, approved by the two largest parties (PSD and PS), which further removed the left-wing ideological tone from the text, liberalizing the economic system. The arrival of European funds also initiated a period of strong economic transformation and modernization of the country's infrastructure. Despite the stability and strong economy, the PSD government faced protests, strikes and criticisms for its reforms, as well as some controversies, such as the "case of the contaminated hemophiliacs", in which hemophiliac patients were infected with plasma contaminated with HIV/AIDS virus, leading to the resignation of the then health minister, Leonor Beleza. The PSD suffered setbacks in the European and local elections during 1989. On the international front, the government mediated the Bicesse Accords with the aim of ending the Angolan Civil War.

=== Leadership changes and challenges ===
==== Democratic and Social Center ====
After CDS' poor results, just 4 percent in the 1987 general elections, then CDS leader Adriano Moreira announced he would leave the leadership and called a party congress to elect a new leader. Diogo Freitas do Amaral, former party leader and defeated candidate in the 1986 presidential election, decided to ran for the party's leadership, being the sole candidate on the ballot.

Ballot: 31 January 1988
Candidate	Votes	%
Diogo Freitas do Amaral	Voice vote	
Turnout		100.0

==== Socialist Party ====
Following the 1987 election defeat, party leader Vítor Constâncio faced strong pressures because of his strategy, with interferences also from President Mário Soares, and difficulties in finding a strong candidate to contest the 1989 Lisbon local election. Because of these pressures, Constâncio resigned in late 1988 and a party congress to elect a new leader was called for mid January 1989. Two candidates were on the ballot, Jorge Sampaio and Jaime Gama. Sampaio was easily elected as PS leader.

Ballot: 15 January 1989
Candidate	Votes	%
Jorge Sampaio	1,013	62.7
Jaime Gama	561	34.7
Blank/Invalid ballots	42	2.6
Turnout	1,616	
Source: Acção Socialista

==== Democratic Renewal Party ====
The Democratic Renewal Party's results in the 1987 election were disappointing and António Ramalho Eanes resigned from the leadership. Hermínio Martinho returned to the leadership, but the party was plagued by deep divisions on its ideology and strategy, with key members, including Ramalho Eanes, announcing their departure from the party. In June 1991, the party held a leadership ballot between Hermínio Martinho and Pedro Canavarro. Martinho defended the dissolution of the party, while Canavarro proposed the continuation of the party. The ballot results gave Canavarro a landslide victory. The results were the following:

Ballot: 2 June 1991
Candidate	Votes	%
Pedro Canavarro	145	79.2
Hermínio Martinho	38	20.8
Turnout	183	

== Electoral system ==
The Assembly of the Republic has 230 members elected to four-year terms. The total number of MPs was reduced in 1989, during the Constitutional amendments, to 230 from the previous 250. Governments do not require absolute majority support of the Assembly to hold office, as even if the number of opposers of government is larger than that of the supporters, the number of opposers still needs to be equal or greater than 116 (absolute majority) for both the Government's Programme to be rejected or for a motion of no confidence to be approved.

The number of seats assigned to each district depends on the district magnitude. The use of the d'Hondt method makes for a higher effective threshold than certain other allocation methods such as the Hare quota or Sainte-Laguë method, which are more generous to small parties.

For these elections, and compared with the 1987 elections, the MPs distributed by districts were the following:

District	Number of MPs	Map
Lisbon^{(–6)}	50	
Porto^{(–2)}	37	
Braga^{(–1)} and Setúbal^{(–1)}	16	
Aveiro^{(–1)}	14	
Leiria^{(–1)}, Santarém^{(–2)} and Coimbra^{(–1)}	10	
Viseu^{(–1)}	9	
Faro^{(–1)}	8	
Vila Real and Viana do Castelo	6	
Azores, Castelo Branco, Madeira	5	
Beja^{(–1)}, Bragança, Évora and Guarda^{(–1)}	4	
Portalegre	3	
Europe and Outside Europe	2	

== Parties ==
The table below lists the parties represented in the Assembly of the Republic during the 5th legislature (1987–1991) and that also partook in the election:

=== With the 1987 seat distribution ===
Name		Ideology	Political position	Leader	1987 result		Seats at dissolution
Name		Ideology	Political position	Leader	%	Seats	Seats at dissolution
PPD/PSD	Social Democratic Party; Partido Social Democrata	Liberal conservatism Classical liberalism	Centre-right	Aníbal; Cavaco Silva	50.2%	148 / 250	148 / 250
PS	Socialist Party; Partido Socialista	Social democracy	Centre-left	Jorge Sampaio	22.2%	60 / 250	67 / 250
PCP	Portuguese Communist Party; Partido Comunista Português	Communism; Marxism–Leninism	Far-left	Álvaro Cunhal	12.1% (Note: The Portuguese Communist Party (PCP) and the Ecologist Party "The Greens" (PEV) contested the 1987 election in a coalition called Unitary Democratic Coalition (CDU) and won a combined 12.1% of the vote and elected 31 MPs to parliament.)	29 / 250	29 / 250
PEV	Ecologist Party "The Greens"; Partido Ecologista "Os Verdes"	Eco-socialism; Green politics	Left-wing	Isabel Castro	12.1%	2 / 250	0 / 250
PRD	Democratic Renewal Party; Partido Renovador Democrático	Centrism; Third Way	Centre	Pedro; Canavarro	4.9%	7 / 250	0 / 250
CDS	Democratic and Social Centre; Centro Democrático e Social	Christian democracy Conservatism	Centre-right to right-wing	Diogo Freitas do Amaral	4.4%	4 / 250	4 / 250
Ind.	Independent; Independente	Ecologist Party "The Greens" caucus dissolved in December 1990;					2 / 250

==== Seat changes ====
- On December 1990, the 7 MPs of the Democratic Renewal Party left the party and decided to join the Socialist Party caucus, after a split with the party's leader, Pedro Canavarro.
- Also on December 1990, the two MPs from the Ecologist Party "The Greens" decided to dissolve their caucus and sit as Independents, following disagreements with the Portuguese Communist Party and defending an ecological party not aligned with the Communists.

=== 1987 results with the new seat distribution ===
Name		Ideology	Political position	Leader	1987 notional result	
Name		Ideology	Political position	Leader	%	Seats
PPD/PSD	Social Democratic Party; Partido Social Democrata	Liberal conservatism Classical liberalism	Centre-right	Aníbal; Cavaco Silva	50.2%	138 / 230
PS	Socialist Party; Partido Socialista	Social democracy	Centre-left	Jorge Sampaio	22.2%	56 / 230
PCP	Portuguese Communist Party; Partido Comunista Português	Communism; Marxism–Leninism	Far-left	Álvaro Cunhal	12.1%	24 / 230
PEV	Ecologist Party "The Greens"; Partido Ecologista "Os Verdes"	Eco-socialism; Green politics	Left-wing	Isabel Castro	12.1%	2 / 230
PRD	Democratic Renewal Party; Partido Renovador Democrático	Centrism; Third Way	Centre	Pedro; Canavarro	4.9%	6 / 230
CDS	Democratic and Social Centre; Centro Democrático e Social	Christian democracy Conservatism	Centre-right to right-wing	Diogo Freitas do Amaral	4.4%	4 / 230

== Campaign period ==
=== Issues ===
In the context of a strong economy, the election campaign became a "plebiscite" on Prime Minister Cavaco Silva's government. The Prime Minister even campaigned on a promise not to remain in office if the Social Democrats (PSD) failed to secure a majority of seats, warning of the dangers of instability. Opposition parties responded by accusing Cavaco Silva of trying to "blackmail" the electorate, with Socialist (PS) leader Jorge Sampaio stressing that voters had a "clear choice" between a PS or PSD government.

=== Party slogans ===
Party or alliance	Original slogan	English translation	Refs
PSD	« No bom caminho »	"On the right track"	
PS	« Agora nós »	"Now us."	
CDU	« Para um Portugal melhor »	"For a better Portugal"	
CDS	« A verdade, sempre! »	"The truth, always!"	
PSN	« O sol está a nascer para todos. »	"The sun is rising for everyone."	

=== Candidates' debates ===
No debates between the main parties were held as the PSD leader and Prime Minister, Aníbal Cavaco Silva, refused to take part in any debate.

== Opinion polling ==
The following table shows the opinion polls of voting intention of the Portuguese voters before the election. Included is also the result of the Portuguese general elections in 1987 and 1991 for reference.

Note, until 2000, the publication of opinion polls in the last week of the campaign was forbidden.

Exit poll

Polling firm/Link	Date Released	PSD	PS	CDU	CDS	PSN	O	Lead
1991 legislative election	6 Oct 1991	50.6; 135	29.1; 72	8.8; 17	4.4; 5	1.7; 1	5.4; 0	21.5
UCP	6 Oct 1991	48.0– 51.9; 128/138	28.5– 31.5; 73/83	7.5– 10.0; 11/14	4.5– 5.5; 4/7	? 1/2	PSR ? 1/2	19.5; 20.4
Euroexpansão	6 Oct 1991	45.8– 50.2	29.8– 33.9	6.8– 9.1	3.7– 5.5	1.0– 2.0	PSR 1.4–2.6	16.0; 16.3
Euroteste	6 Oct 1991	47–50	31–34	7.5–10	4–5	–	PSR 1.0–1.5	16
GEOIDEIA	6 Oct 1991	49–52	29–31	7–9	3–4	2–3	PSR 1.0–2.0	20; 21
Rádio Press	6 Oct 1991	45.5	35.0	9.6	4.5	–	—	10.5
Rádio Correio da Manhã	6 Oct 1991	45.8– 50.2	29.8– 33.9	6.8– 9.1	3.7– 5.5	1.0– 2.0	PSR 1.4–2.6	16.0; 16.3
Pluriteste	30 Sep 1991	41.2	34.7	8.4	8.1	—N/a	7.7 (Note: PRD: 3.3%; Others/Invalid: 4.4%.)	6.5
UCP (Note: Results presented here exclude undecideds (7.2%). With their inclusion results are: PSD: 47.6%; PS: 27.2%; CDU: 6.9%; CDS: 4.6%; Others/Invalid: 6.5%.)	29 Sep 1991	51.3; 134	29.3; 73	7.5; 12	5.0; 5	—N/a	7.0; 2	22.0
Euroteste	28 Sep 1991	47.3	35.5	8.5	4.1	—N/a	4.6	11.8
Euroteste	28 Sep 1991	46.0	37.0	9.7	3.9	—N/a	3.4	9.0
Euroexpansão	28 Sep 1991	44	33	9	6	—N/a	8	11
Marktest	27 Sep 1991	43.1	32.8	7.7	4.6	—N/a	11.8	10.3
Euroteste	20 Sep 1991	45.6	35.5	10.0	4.4	—N/a	4.5	10.1
Marktest	20 Sep 1991	41.9	31.9	7.3	4.4	—N/a	14.5	10.0
Pluriteste	16 Sep 1991	39.2	26.6	6.2	6.0	—N/a	22.0	12.6
Euroteste	16 Sep 1991	45.1	34.5	10.2	5.2	—N/a	5.0	10.6
Norma	14 Sep 1991	45.0	37.5	11.2	3.5	—N/a	2.8	7.5
Euroexpansão	14 Sep 1991	44.7	40.0	—N/a	—N/a	—N/a	15.3	4.7
DN	9 Sep 1991	38.8	36.1	—N/a	—N/a	—N/a	25.1	2.7
Euroexpansão/Marktest	28 Aug 1991	35.3	36.8	8.7	4.9	—N/a	14.3	1.5
DN/Renascença	13 Aug 1991	46.5	38.3	—N/a	—N/a	—N/a	15.2	8.2
DN/Renascença	6 Aug 1991	44.8	41.6	—N/a	—N/a	—N/a	13.6	3.2
Euroteste/JN	4 Aug 1991	47.5	37.8	12.3	8.2	—N/a	—N/a	7.7
PSD	19 Jul 1991	54	?	?	?	—N/a	?	?
PCP	19 Jul 1991	52	?	?	?	—N/a	?	?
Norma	19 Jul 1991	43.7	32.9	12.4	6.5	—N/a	4.5	10.8
Euroteste	19 Jul 1991	45.4	36.6	10.8	4.0	—N/a	3.2	8.8
Euroteste (Note: Results presented here exclude undecideds (15.0%). With their inclusion results are: PSD: 40.4%; PS: 31.4%; CDU: 7.9%; CDS: 3.0%; Others/Invalid: 2.3%.)	13 Jan 1991	47.5	36.9	9.3	3.5	—N/a	2.7	10.6
1989 local elections	17 Dec 1989	35.3	36.7	13.3	9.1	—N/a	5.6	1.4
Norma	29 Oct 1989	41.3	31.4	14.4	3.4	—N/a	9.5 (Note: PRD: 3.3%; Others/Invalid: 6.2%.)	9.9
1989 EP elections	18 Jun 1989	32.8	28.5	14.4	14.2	—N/a	10.1	4.3
Euroexpansão	18 Jun 1988	38.5	?	?	?	—N/a	?	?
1987 legislative election	19 Jul 1987	50.2; 148	22.2; 60	12.1; 31	4.4; 4	—N/a	11.1; 7	28.0

== Results ==
=== National summary ===
Party	Votes	%	+/–	Seats	+/–
Social Democratic Party	2,902,351	50.60	+0.38	135	–13
Socialist Party	1,670,758	29.13	+6.89	72	+12
Unitary Democratic Coalition (Note: Portuguese Communist Party (15 MPs) and "The Greens" (2 MPs) ran in coalition.)	504,583	8.80	–3.34	17	–14
Democratic and Social Centre	254,317	4.43	–0.01	5	+1
National Solidarity Party	96,096	1.68	New	1	New
Revolutionary Socialist Party	64,159	1.12	+0.54	0	0
Portuguese Workers' Communist Party	48,542	0.85	+0.47	0	0
Democratic Renewal Party	35,077	0.61	–4.30	0	–7
People's Monarchist Party	25,216	0.44	+0.03	0	0
Democratic Party of the Atlantic	10,842	0.19	New	0	New
Left Revolutionary Front	6,661	0.12	New	0	New
Popular Democratic Union (Note: People's Democratic Union electoral list only in Madeira and Azores.)	6,157	0.11	–0.78	0	0
Total	5,624,759	100.00	–	230	–20
Valid votes	5,624,759	98.07	+0.25		
Invalid votes	63,020	1.10	–0.20		
Blank votes	47,652	0.83	–0.05		
Total votes	5,735,431	100.00	–		
Registered voters/turnout	8,462,357	67.78	–3.79		
Source: Comissão Nacional de Eleições

Vote share
PSD	50.60%
PS	29.13%
CDU	8.80%
CDS	4.43%
PSN	1.68%
PSR	1.12%
PCTP/MRPP	0.85%
PRD	0.61%
Others	0.86%
Blank/Invalid	1.93%

Parliamentary seats
PSD	58.70%
PS	31.30%
CDU	7.39%
CDS	2.17%
PSN	0.43%

=== Distribution by constituency ===
Results of the 1991 election of the Portuguese Assembly of the Republic by constituency
Constituency	%	S	%	S	%	S	%	S	%	S	Total S
Constituency	PSD		PS		CDU		CDS		PSN		Total S
Azores	64.1	4	25.8	1	1.3	-	3.4	-			5
Aveiro	58.6	9	27.8	4	2.8	-	6.1	1	1.3	-	14
Beja	29.3	1	28.4	1	30.4	2	2.3	-	1.0	-	4
Braga	53.6	10	31.5	5	4.6	-	5.6	1	0.8	-	16
Bragança	57.9	3	25.7	1	2.1	-	8.2	-	1.5	-	4
Castelo Branco	51.8	3	32.4	2	4.6	-	3.9	-	2.3	-	5
Coimbra	49.9	6	34.4	4	5.0	-	3.5	-	1.7	-	10
Évora	35.0	2	25.9	1	27.1	1	2.8	-	1.4	-	4
Faro	50.8	5	31.2	3	7.2	-	2.8	-	2.2	-	8
Guarda	58.6	3	26.8	1	2.3	-	5.9	-	1.3	-	4
Leiria	61.2	7	23.0	3	4.5	-	4.8	-	1.4	-	10
Lisbon	45.3	25	29.7	16	12.2	6	4.0	2	2.6	1	50
Madeira	62.4	4	20.2	1	1.0	-	6.1	-	1.9	-	5
Portalegre	38.9	2	33.5	1	15.2	-	3.3	-	1.8	-	3
Porto	51.3	21	32.9	13	6.4	2	4.1	1	1.1	-	37
Santarém	49.1	6	29.4	3	9.8	1	3.3	-	2.2	-	10
Setúbal	34.7	6	28.4	5	24.9	5	2.7	-	2.4	-	16
Viana do Castelo	56.9	4	25.2	2	5.0	-	7.2	-	1.2	-	6
Vila Real	60.6	4	26.0	2	2.6	-	5.1	-	1.2	-	6
Viseu	64.3	7	19.4	2	2.1	-	6.3	-	1.3	-	9
Europe	53.7	1	31.9	1	7.8	-	3.0	-			2
Outside Europe	77.3	2	4.9	-	1.0	-	14.6	-			2
Total	50.6	135	29.1	72	8.8	17	4.4	5	1.7	1	230
Source: Comissão Nacional de Eleições

=== Maps ===
Winner and seats by constituency.

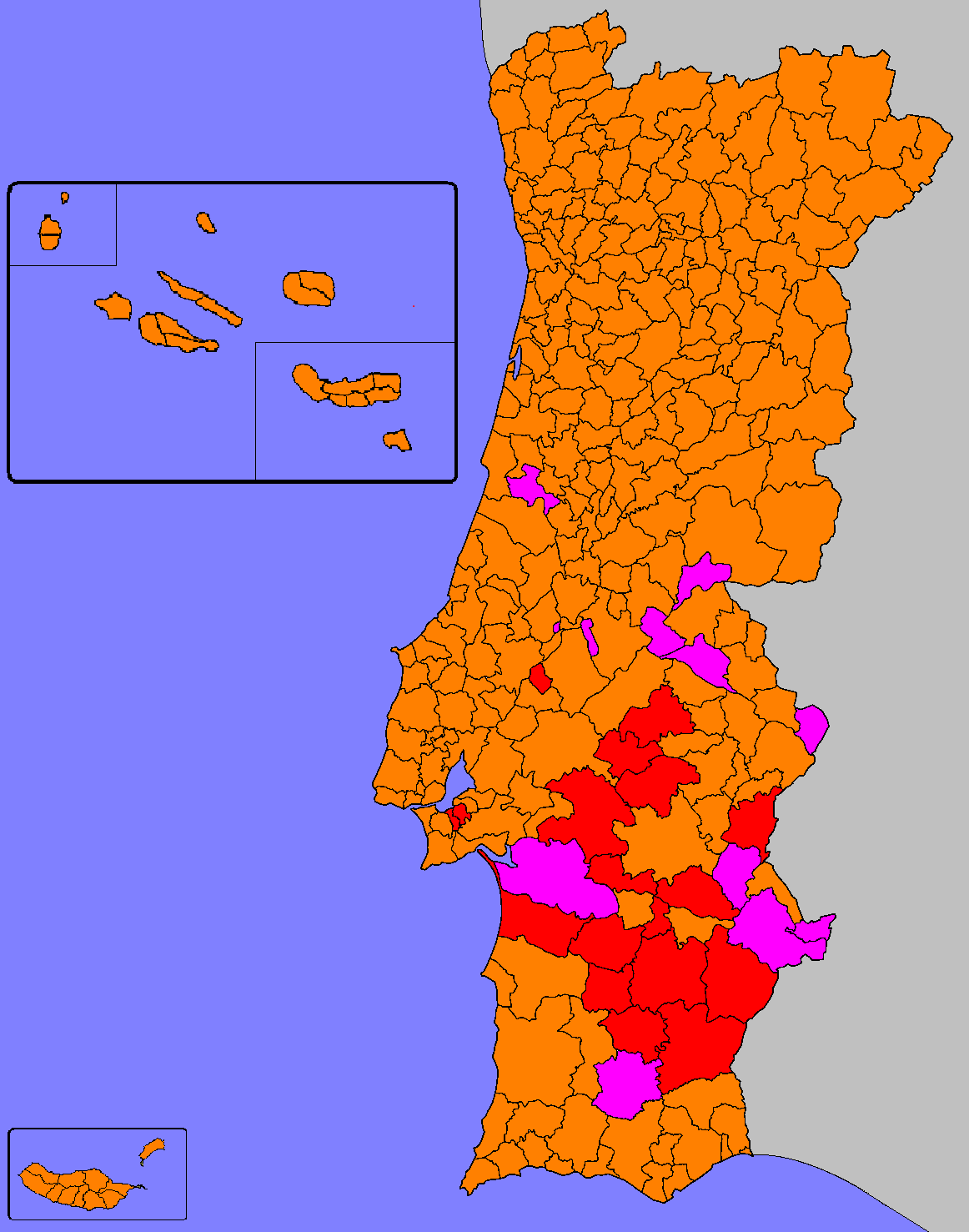
Most voted political force by municipality.

== See also ==
- Politics of Portugal
- List of political parties in Portugal
- Elections in Portugal
