= 1994 European Parliament election in Portugal =

- 12 June 1994

25 seats to the European Parliament
- Turnout: 35.5% ▼15.6 pp
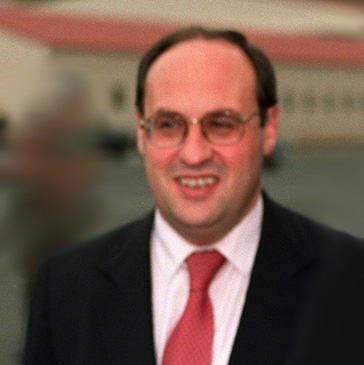

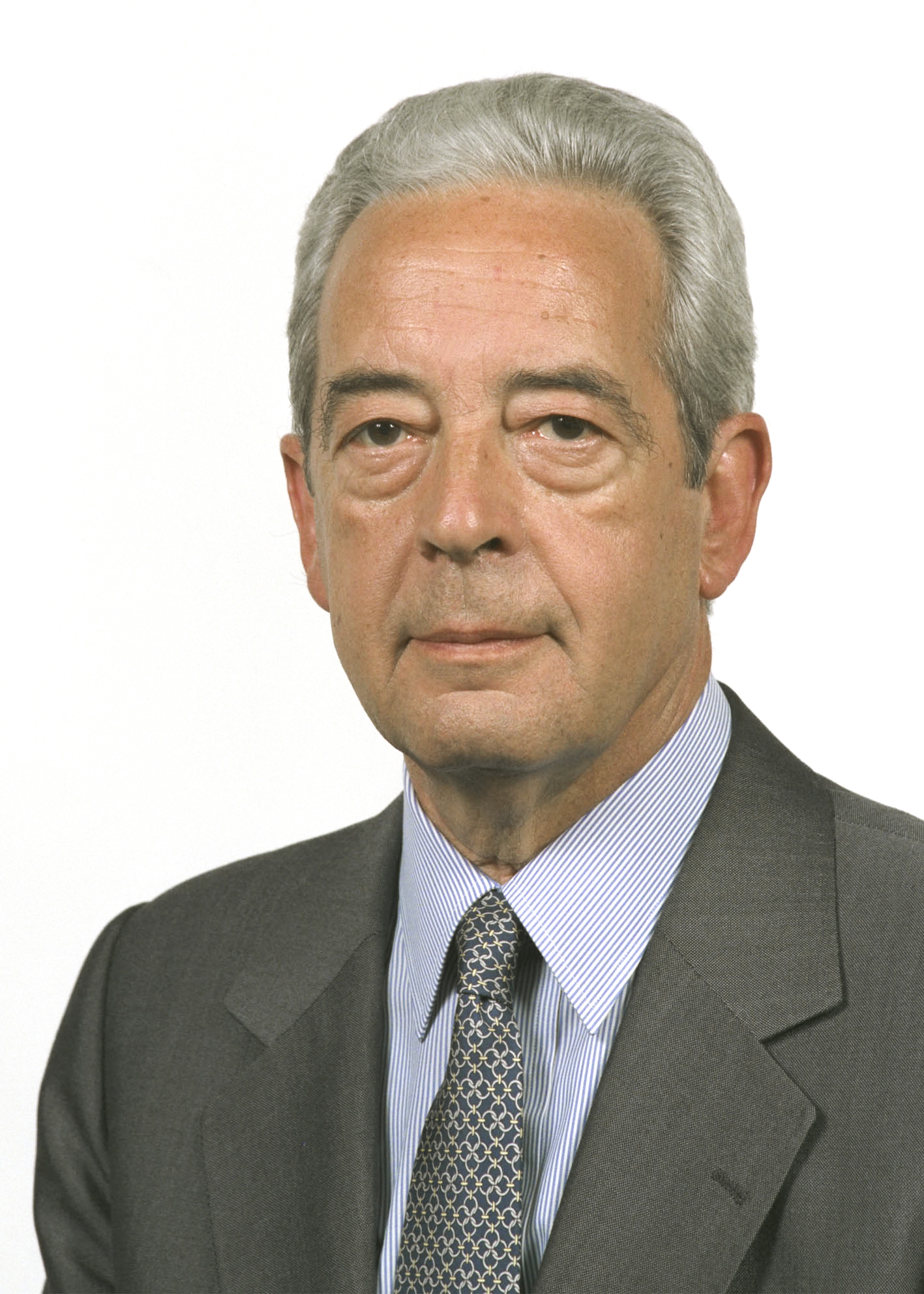

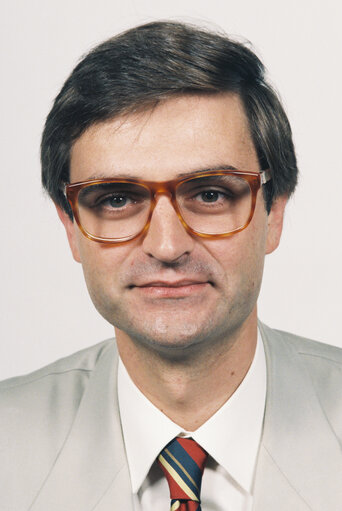

| | First party | Second party |
|---|---|---|
| Leader | António Vitorino | Eurico de Melo |
| Party | PS | PSD |
| Alliance | PES | EPP |
| Last election | 7 seats, 28.5% (Note: The Democratic Renewal Party (PRD) elected one MEP within the PS lists in 1989. The party contested the 1994 election alone.) | 9 seats, 32.8% |
| Seats won | 10 | 9 |
| Seat change | ▲3 | 0 |
| Popular vote | 1,061,560 | 1,046,918 |
| Percentage | 34.9% | 34.4% |
| Swing | ▲6.3 pp | ▲1.6 pp |
| | Third party | Fourth party |
| Leader | Manuel Monteiro | Luis Sá |
| Party | CDS–PP | CDU |
| Alliance | EDA | GUE/NGL |
| Last election | 3 seats, 14.2% | 4 seats, 14.4% |
| Seats won | 3 | 3 |
| Seat change | 0 | ▼1 |
| Popular vote | 379,044 | 340,725 |
| Percentage | 12.5% | 11.2% |
| Swing | ▼1.7 pp | ▼3.2 pp |

An election of MEP representing Portugal constituency for the 1994-1999 term of the European Parliament was held on 12 June 1994. It was part of the wider 1994 European election.

In the closest nationwide election in Portuguese history, the Socialist Party (PS) polled just less than 0.5 percent ahead of the Social Democrats (PSD). Nonetheless, it was a very strong performance from the Socialists, as they achieved a 6 percent increase compared to 1989, and also won three more MEPs. It was also the first nationwide election victory for the PS since the 1983 general elections. At that time, the PSD was in government for nearly 9 years, under Prime Minister Cavaco Silva, but the party suffered little wear. The Social Democrats won 34.4 percent of the votes, a gain of more than 1.5 percent compared with 1989, and was able to hold on to the 9 seats they had from 1989.

The People's Party (CDS–PP), although losing some ground, was able to return to 3rd place with a very nationalist and anti-Europe speech. The CDS–PP won 12.5 percent of the votes, a drop of almost 2 percent, but held on to their 3 seats. The Democratic Unity Coalition (CDU) had a poor performance, falling to 4th place, and losing both share of vote and seats. The Communist/Green alliance won just 11 percent of the votes, a drop of 3 percent, and lost the sole seat from the Ecologist Party "The Greens".

Turnout fell to all-time low levels, with just 35.5 percent of voters casting a ballot.

== Electoral system ==
The voting method used, for the election of European members of parliament, is by proportional representation using the d'Hondt method, which is known to benefit leading parties. In the 1994 EU elections, Portugal had 25 seats to be filled. Deputies are elected in a single constituency, corresponding to the entire national territory.

== Parties and candidates ==
The major parties that partook in the election, and their EP list leaders, were:

- People's Party (CDS–PP), Manuel Monteiro
- Democratic Unity Coalition (CDU), Luís Sá
- Unity Movement for Workers (MUT), Carmelinda Pereira
- Portuguese Workers' Communist Party (PCTP/MRPP), António Garcia Pereira
- Democratic Renewal Party (PRD), Manuel Vargas Loureiro
- Socialist Party (PS), António Vitorino
- Social Democratic Party (PSD), Eurico de Melo
- National Solidarity Party (PSN), Antunes de Sousa
- Revolutionary Socialist Party (PSR), Helena Lopes da Silva
- People's Monarchist Party (PPM), Paula Marinho
- Politics XXI (PXXI), Ivan Nunes
- Popular Democratic Union (UDP), Carlos Marques

== Campaign period ==
=== Party slogans ===
| Party or alliance | Original slogan | English translation | Refs |
|---|---|---|---|
| PSD | « Europa Sim, Portugal Sempre » | "Europe Yes, Portugal Always" | |
| PS | « Connosco na Europa, os Portugueses têm voz » | "With us in Europe, the Portuguese have a voice" | |
| CDU | « Vota CDU: é melhor para Portugal » | "Vote CDU: it's better for Portugal" | |
| CDS–PP | « Viva Portugal » | "Long live Portugal" | |

=== Candidates' debates ===
1994 European Parliament election in Portugal debates
| Date | Organisers | Moderator(s) | P Present A Absent invitee N Non-invitee | | | | |
| Date | Organisers | Moderator(s) | PSD Melo | PS Vitorino | CDU Sá | CDS–PP Monteiro | Refs |
|---|---|---|---|---|---|---|---|
| 5 May | TSF | Maria Flor Pedroso | P | P | P | P | |

== Opinion polling ==
The following table shows the opinion polls of voting intention of the Portuguese voters before the election. Those parties that are listed were represented in the EU parliament (1989-1994). Included is also the result of the Portuguese EP elections in 1989 and 1994 for reference.

Note, until 2000, the publication of opinion polls in the last week of the campaign was forbidden.

Exit poll

| Polling firm/Link | Date Released | PSD | PS | CDU | CDS–PP | O | Lead |
|---|---|---|---|---|---|---|---|
| 1994 EP election | 12 Jun 1994 | 34.4; 9 | 34.9; 10 | 11.2; 3 | 12.5; 3 | 7.1; 0 | 0.5 |
| Compta RH | 12 Jun 1994 | 28.1–33.1; 9 | 35.3–40.3; 10 | 10.0–13.0; 3 | 8.9–11.9; 3 | | 7.2 |
| Euroteste | 4 Jun 1994 | 31.0 | 32.4 | 11.2 | 10.3 | 15.1 | 1.4 |
| Norma | 4 Jun 1994 | 28.6 | 33.0 | 10.1 | 10.6 | 17.7 | 4.4 |
| Euroexpansão | 4 Jun 1994 | 28.2 | 39.5 | 7.2 | 7.8 | 17.3 | 11.3 |
| UCP | 3 Jun 1994 | 32.3; 8/9 | 42.5; 10/11 | 8.7; 2/3 | 13.0; 3/4 | 3.5; 0 | 10.2 |
| Semanário | 28 May 1994 | 34.7 | 40.0 | —N/a | —N/a | 25.3 | 5.3 |
| Euroexpansão | 21 May 1994 | 26.2 | 39.4 | 9.0 | 7.4 | 18.0 | 13.2 |
| Independente | 20 May 1994 | 29.8 | 41.5 | —N/a | —N/a | 28.7 | 11.7 |
| Visão | 12 May 1994 | 28.1 | 47.1 | 5.2 | 10.6 | 9.0 | 19.0 |
| 1989 EP election | 18 Jun 1989 | 32.8; 9 | 28.5; 8 | 14.4; 4 | 14.2; 3 | 10.1; 0 | 4.3 |

== Results ==
| Party and European Parliament group | | Votes | % | +/– | Seats | +/– |
|---|---|---|---|---|---|---|
| Socialist Party | PES | 1,061,560 | 34.87 | +6.33 | 10 | +2 |
| Social Democratic Party | EPP | 1,046,918 | 34.39 | +1.64 | 9 | 0 |
| CDS – People's Party | EDA | 379,044 | 12.45 | –1.71 | 3 | 0 |
| Unitary Democratic Coalition | EUL | 340,725 | 11.19 | –3.21 | 3 | –1 |
| Portuguese Workers' Communist Party | NI | 24,022 | 0.79 | +0.15 | 0 | 0 |
| Popular Democratic Union | NI | 18,884 | 0.62 | –0.46 | 0 | 0 |
| Revolutionary Socialist Party | NI | 17,780 | 0.58 | –0.19 | 0 | 0 |
| Earth Party | ELDR | 12,955 | 0.43 | New | 0 | New |
| Politics XXI | NI | 12,402 | 0.41 | New | 0 | New |
| National Solidarity Party | NI | 11,214 | 0.37 | New | 0 | New |
| People's Monarchist Party | NI | 8,300 | 0.27 | –1.79 | 0 | 0 |
| Democratic Party of the Atlantic | NI | 7,127 | 0.23 | New | 0 | New |
| Democratic Renewal Party | RBW | 5,941 | 0.20 | | 0 | –1 |
| Unity Movement for Workers | NI | 2,893 | 0.10 | –0.17 | 0 | 0 |
| Total | | 2,949,765 | 100.00 | – | 25 | +1 |
| Valid votes | | 2,949,765 | 96.90 | –0.02 | | |
| Invalid votes | | 45,320 | 1.49 | 0.00 | | |
| Blank votes | | 48,916 | 1.61 | +0.02 | | |
| Total votes | | 3,044,001 | 100.00 | – | | |
| Registered voters/turnout | | 8,565,822 | 35.54 | –15.56 | | |
Source: Comissão Nacional de Eleições

Vote share
| PS | 34.87% |
| PSD | 34.39% |
| CDS-PP | 12.45% |
| CDU | 11.19% |
| PCTP/MRPP | 0.79% |
| UDP | 0.62% |
| PSR | 0.58% |
| Others | 2.01% |
| Blank/Invalid | 3.10% |

Seats
| PS | 40.00% |
| PSD | 36.00% |
| CDS-PP | 12.00% |
| CDU | 12.00% |

=== Distribution by European group ===
Summary of political group distribution in the 4th European Parliament (1994–1999)
| Groups | Parties | Seats | Total | % |
|---|---|---|---|---|
| Party of European Socialists (PES) | Socialist Party (PS) | 10 | 10 | 40.00 |
| European People's Party (EPP) | Social Democratic Party (PSD) | 9 | 9 | 36.00 |
| European United Left (EUL) | Portuguese Communist Party (PCP) | 3 | 3 | 12.00 |
| European Democratic Alliance (EDA) | People's Party (CDS–PP) | 3 | 3 | 12.00 |
| Total | | 25 | 25 | 100.00 |

=== Maps ===
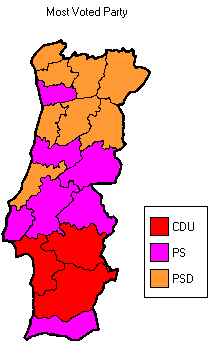
Most voted political force by district. (Azores and Madeira not shown)

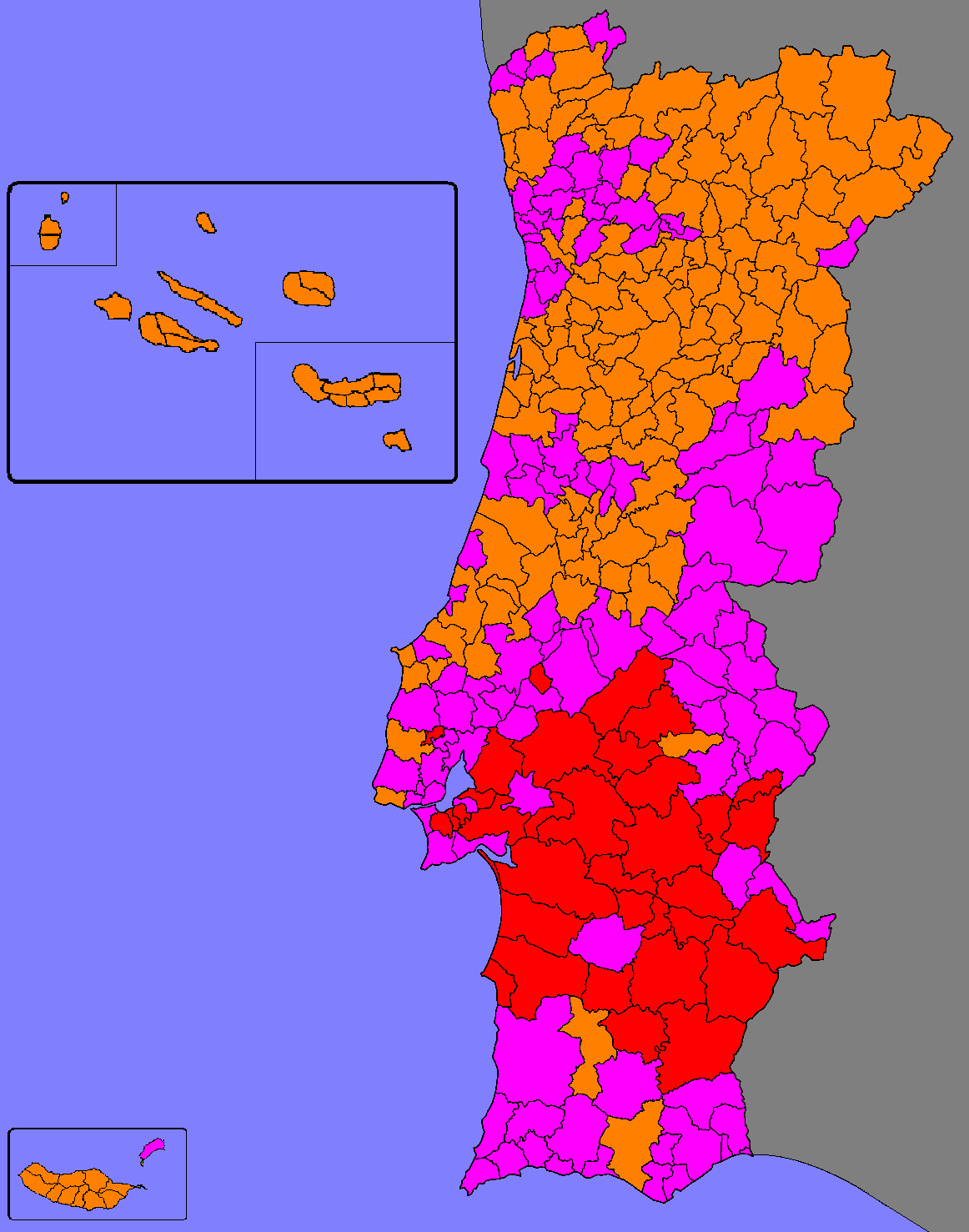
Strongest party by municipality.

== See also ==
- Politics of Portugal
- List of political parties in Portugal
- Elections in Portugal
- European Parliament
