= Democratic Intervention =

Democratic Intervention Intervenção Democrática
- Founded: 1987
- Split from: Portuguese Democratic Movement
- Newspaper: Seara Nova
- Ideology: Socialism
- Political position: Left-wing
- National affiliation: Unitary Democratic Coalition

The Democratic Intervention (Portuguese: Intervenção Democrática or ID) is a Portuguese left-wing political association founded in order to promote and defend socialist ideas in Portugal and other countries. Members of it take part as independents in the Unitary Democratic Coalition electoral alliance, along with the Portuguese Communist Party and the Ecologist Party "The Greens".

The association is the current owner and publisher of the journal Seara Nova (in Portuguese), an important publication in the intellectual resistance and fight against Estado Novo, the Portuguese dictatorship of 1926–1974.
