= Popular Democratic Union (Portugal) =

Marxist political movement in Portugal

Popular Democratic Union União Democrática Popular
- Abbreviation: UDP
- President: Mário Durval
- Founded: 1 December 1974; 3 April 2005
- Dissolved: 3 April 2005
- Merger of: CARP (ML); URML; CCR (ML)
- Merged into: Left Bloc
- Headquarters: Rua de São Bento, 698, Lisboa, Portugal 1250-223
- Newspaper: A Comuna
- Ideology: Marxism; Socialism
- Political position: Left-wing
- Colours: Red

Website
- www.udp.pt

UDP 6th Congress poster

The Popular Democratic Union (Portuguese: União Democrática Popular, pronounced [uniˈɐ̃w dɨmuˈkɾatikɐ pupuˈlaɾ], or UDP) is a Marxist political movement and former political party in Portugal. The UDP transformed itself into a political association at its 15th congress due to its merger with other left-wing parties in the Left Bloc.

== History ==
The party was founded in December 1974 as a common mass front of the Committee for Support to the Reconstruction of the Party (Marxist–Leninist) (CARP(ML)), Revolutionary Marxist–Leninist Unity (URML) and Revolutionary Communist Committees (Marxist–Leninist). UDP ran lists in the first free election in Portugal in 1975, and elected one MP in that election. UDP also ran in the subsequent elections until 1983. After that it ran integrated in the electoral lists of the Portuguese Communist Party until 1991.

In 1998, it became part of the Left Bloc after a merger with other small left-wing parties and movements, the Revolutionary Socialist Party, Politics XXI and the Left Revolutionary Front.

The president of People's Democratic Union is Joana Mortágua, who became leader in 2010 at the age of 24. Joana Mortágua was Left Bloc candidate in the national legislative elections of 2009, electoral district of Évora and is member of the current Political Commission of Left Bloc.

== Electoral history ==
=== Assembly of the Republic ===
| Election | Leader | Votes | % | Seats | +/- | Government |
|---|---|---|---|---|---|---|
| 1975 | João Pulido Valente | 44,877 | 0.8 (#8) | 1 / 250 | New | Constituent assembly |
| 1976 | Acácio Barreiros | 91,690 | 1.7 (#5) | 1 / 263 | 0 | Opposition |
| 1979 | Mário Tomé | 130,842 | 2.2 (#4) | 1 / 250 | 0 | Opposition |
| 1980 | Mário Tomé | 83,204 | 1.4 (#4) | 1 / 250 | 0 | Opposition |
| 1983 | Mário Tomé | w. PSR | | 0 / 250 | ▼1 | No seats |
| 1985 | Mário Tomé | 73,401 | 1.3 (#6) | 0 / 250 | 0 | No seats |
| 1987 | Mário Tomé | 50,717 | 0.9 (#6) | 0 / 250 | 0 | No seats |
| 1991 | Mário Tomé | Unitary Democratic Coalition | | 1 / 230 | ▲1 | Opposition |
| 1995 | Luís Fazenda | 33,876 | 0.6 (#7) | 0 / 230 | ▼1 | No seats |

=== European Parliament ===
| Election | Leader | Votes | % | Seats | +/– | EP Group |
|---|---|---|---|---|---|---|
| 1987 | | 52,835 | 0.9 (#7) | 0 / 24 | New | – |
| 1989 | Luís Fazenda | 45,017 | 1.1 (#7) | 0 / 24 | 0 | – |
| 1994 | Carlos Manuel Marques | 18,884 | 0.6 (#6) | 0 / 24 | 0 | – |

=== Presidential ===
| Election | Candidate | First round | | Second round | | Result |
| Election | Candidate | Votes | % | Votes | % | Result |
|---|---|---|---|---|---|---|
| 1976 | Otelo Saraiva de Carvalho | 792,760 | 16.46 (#2) | | | Lost ✗ |
| 1980 | No candidate | | | | | |
| 1986 | Maria de Lourdes Pintasilgo | 418,961 | 7.38 (#4) | | | Lost ✗ |
| 1991 | Carlos Manuel Marques | 126,581 | 2.57 (#4) | | | Lost ✗ |
| 1996 | Alberto Matos | Withrew | | | | |

Notes:

- In 1996, Alberto Matos withrew in favour of Jorge Sampaio, won.
