= Revolutionary Socialist Party (Portugal) =

Defunct Trotskyist party in Portugal

Revolutionary Socialist Party Partido Socialista Revolucionário
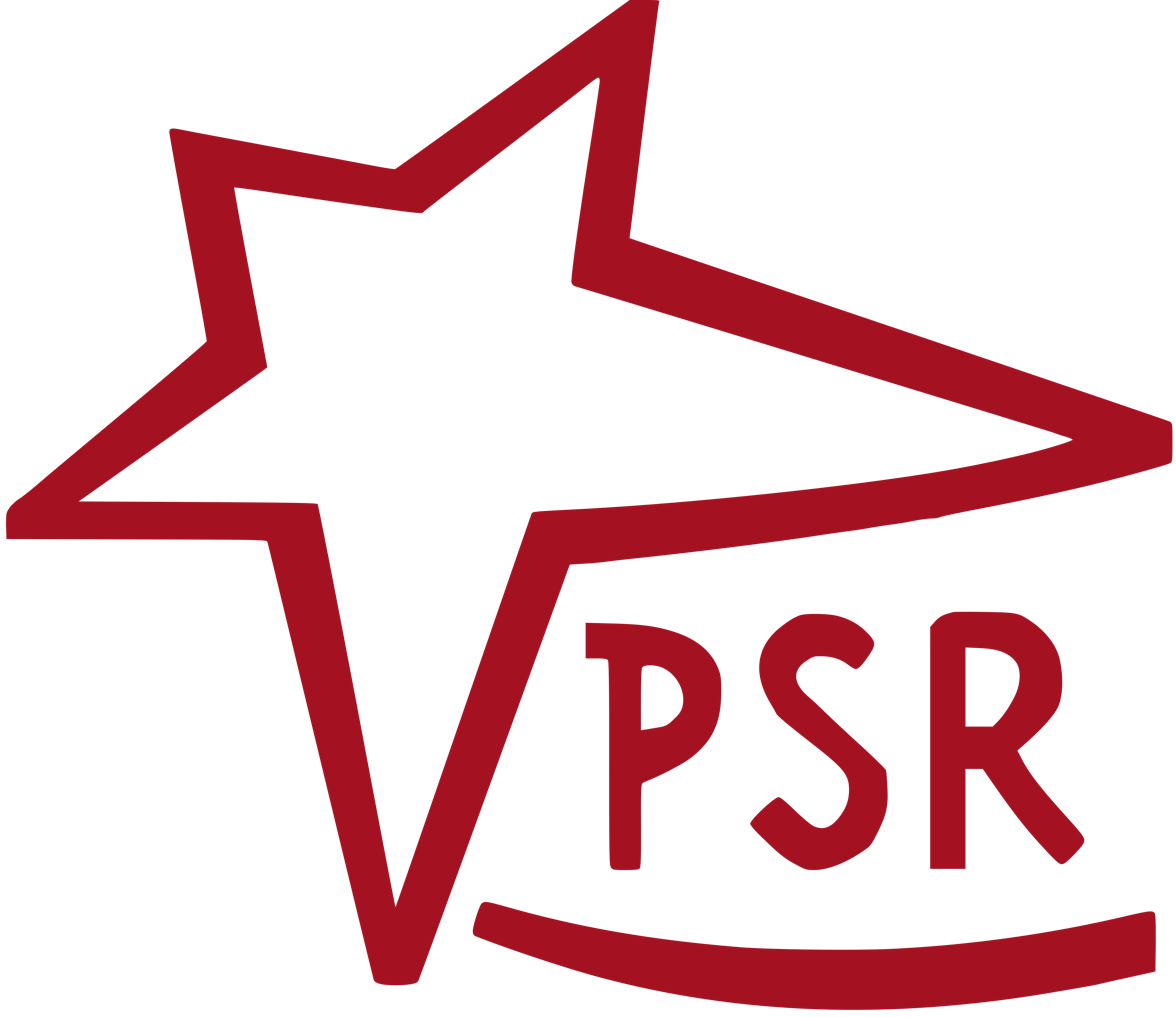
- Leader: Francisco Louçã
- Founded: 1978
- Dissolved: 1999 (as party); 2013 (as association)
- Merger of: Internationalist Communist League; Workers Revolutionary Party
- Succeeded by: Left Bloc
- Headquarters: Rua da Palma, 268; 110-394 Lisbon
- Newspaper: Combate Operário; Revista Combate
- Ideology: Trotskyism; Socialist feminism
- Political position: Left-wing
- International affiliation: Fourth International
- Colours: Maroon

Party flag
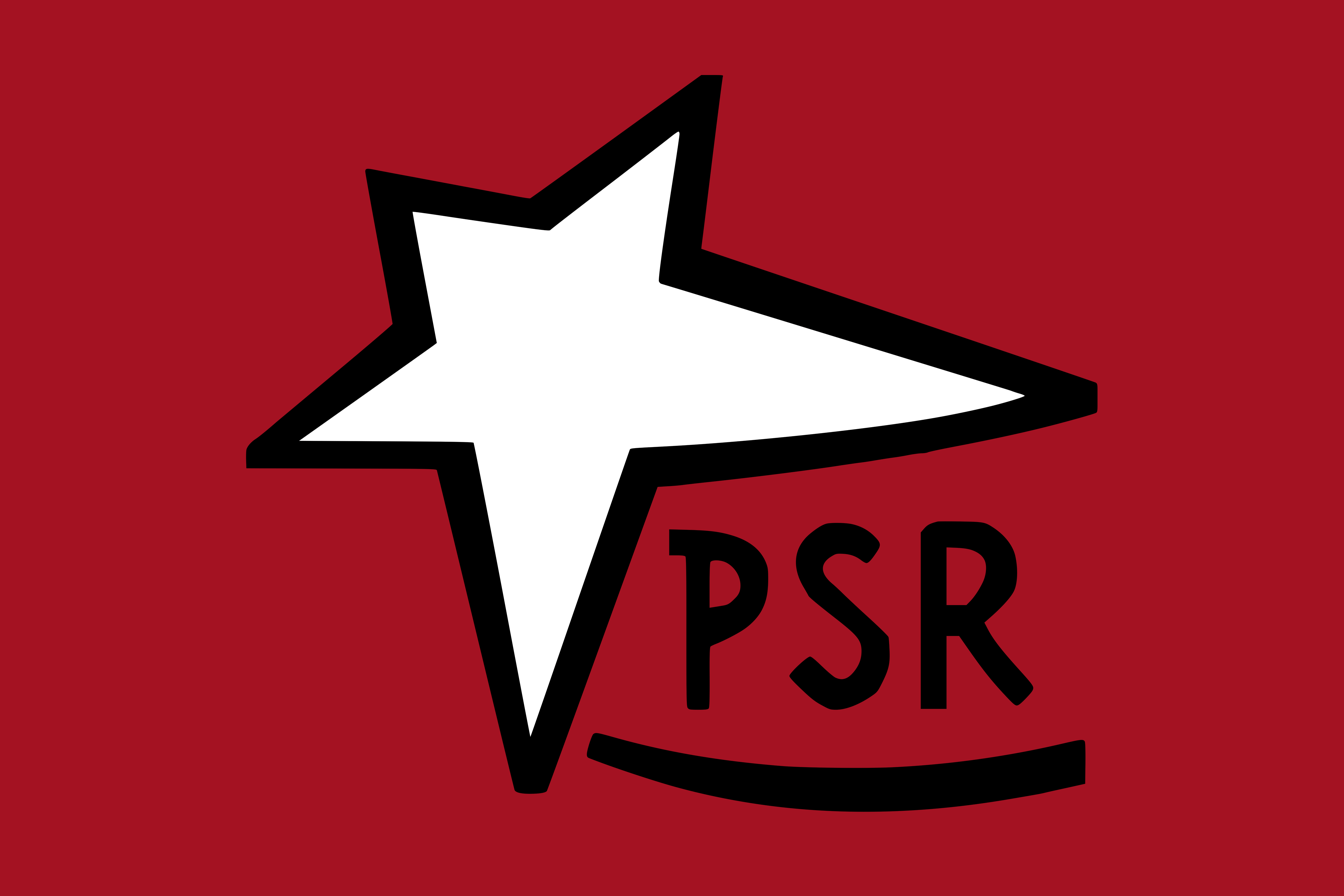

The Revolutionary Socialist Party (Portuguese: Partido Socialista Revolucionário, pronounced [pɐɾˈtiðu susiɐˈliʃtɐ ʁɨvulusiuˈnaɾiu], or PSR) was a left-wing party in Portugal, founded in 1978 after the merger of two Trotskyist parties: the Internationalist Communist League (Portuguese: Liga Comunista Internacionalista LCI) and the Workers Revolutionary Party (Portuguese: Partido Revolucionário dos Trabalhadores, PRT). The LCI and PRT were both part of the reunified Fourth International. The International recognised the PSR as its Portuguese section.

In 1998 Party renamed itself in order to join with some other left-wing parties in founding the Left Bloc (Bloco de Esquerda or BE). The organisation retained the acronym (PSR) and became a civil society organisation under the name Revolutionary Socialist Political Association (Associação Política Socialista Revolucionária (APSR)). The original party, a member of the Fourth International, was however officially dissolved in 2008.

The historical leader of the PSR is Francisco Louçã, who would become leader of the Left Bloc.

The party had never achieved parliamentary representation before the merger in the Left Bloc, although it may be considered the 3rd or 4th biggest left-wing party in the country.

== History ==
=== 1970s ===
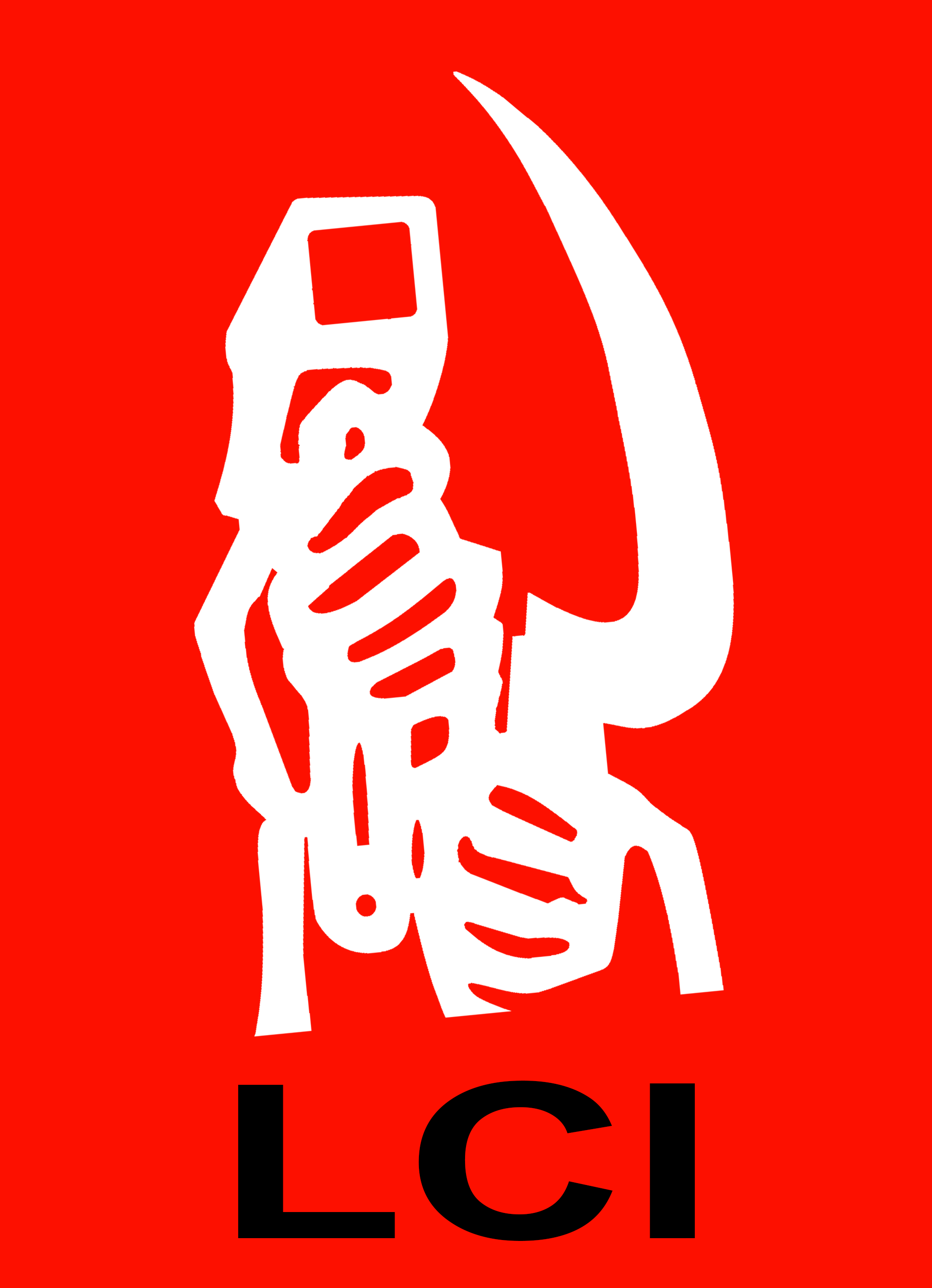
Internationalist Communist League

Accão Comunista

The Internationalist Communist League (Portuguese: Liga Comunista Internacionalista) was a Trotskyist political party in Portugal. LCI was founded in 1973. It became the Portuguese section of the reunified Fourth International. LCI published Acção Comunista, and, for young people, "Toupeira Vermelha". In 1978 LCI merged with PRT to form the Revolutionary Socialist Party.

In 1979, the Party ran in a legislative election for the first time, achieving 0.6% of the voting.The next year, another legislative election took place and the Party achieved 1.0% of the votes.

=== 1980s ===
In 1983, the Party ran in the legislative election in coalition with the People's Democratic Union (Portuguese: União Democrática Popular or UDP) in some constituencies, receiving 0.4% in those constituencies and 0.2% in the others.

In 1985, after some splits, the Party gained a new life, mainly due to its anti-militaristic and anti-racist campaigns and in that year's election, the PSR got 0.6% of the vote. In 1987, the Party contested the first European Election held in Portugal, achieving 0.5%, and in the legislative election, achieving 0.51%.

Also in 1987, the Party started publishing of the Combate (Struggle) monthly newspaper.

At the elections for the European Parliament of 1989, the PSR received 0.8%.

=== 1990s ===
In the legislative election of 1991 got 1.12%, the best result in the Party's history, ran for the last time in an election in 1995, achieving 0.6%.

=== Merging into Left Bloc ===
In 1998, the party formed a permanent coalition with the People's Democratic Union, the Politics XXI and the Left Revolutionary Front, creating the Bloco de Esquerda (Left Bloc). In 2005, in the last congress in the party's history, it changed its status from a party to a political "association", which disappeared in 2013.

== Electoral results ==
=== Assembly of the Republic ===
Election	Leader	Votes	%	Seats	+/-	Government
1979		36,978	0.6 (#9)	0 / 250		No seats
1980		60,496	1.0 (#8)	0 / 250	0	No seats
1983		with UDP		0 / 250	0	No seats
1985		35,238	0.6 (#8)	0 / 250	0	No seats
1987	Francisco Louçã	32,977	0.6 (#7)	0 / 250	0	No seats
1991	Francisco Louçã	64,159	1.1 (#6)	0 / 230	0	No seats
1995	Francisco Louçã	37,638	0.6 (#6)	0 / 230	0	No seats

=== European Parliament ===
Election	Leader	Votes	%	Seats	+/-
1987		29,909	0.5 (#9)	0 / 24	
1989	Francisco Louçã	31,775	0.8 (#8)	0 / 24	0
1994	Helena Lopes da Silva	17,780	0.6 (#7)	0 / 25	0
