= Ecologist Party "The Greens" =

Eco-socialist political party in Portugal

Ecologist Party "The Greens" Partido Ecologista "Os Verdes"
- Abbreviation: PEV
- Leader: Heloísa Apolónia
- Founded: 19 May 1982
- Headquarters: Rua da Boavista 83, 3.º Dto, 1200-066 Lisbon
- Newspaper: Folha Verde
- Youth wing: Ecolojovem
- Membership: 6,000
- Ideology: Eco-socialism; Green politics; Euroscepticism
- Political position: Left-wing
- National affiliation: Unitary Democratic Coalition
- European affiliation: European Green Party
- European Parliament group: Greens–European Free Alliance
- International affiliation: Global Greens
- Colours: Green
- Assembly of the Republic: 0 / 230
- European Parliament: 0 / 21
- Regional parliaments: 0 / 104
- Local government (Mayors): 0 / 308
- Local government (Parishes): 0 / 3,216

Party flag

Website
- osverdes.pt

The Ecologist Party "The Greens" (Portuguese: Partido Ecologista "Os Verdes", pronounced [pɐɾˈtiðu ekuluˈʒiʃtɐ uʒ ˈveɾðɨʃ], PEV) is a Portuguese eco-socialist political party. It is a member of the European Greens and a founding member of the European Federation of Green Parties.

It was the first Portuguese ecologist party, and since its foundation, in 1982, PEV has had a close relationship with the Portuguese Communist Party (PCP). From 1987 onwards, it entered all the legislative, and municipal elections as part of Unitary Democratic Coalition, which also includes the PCP. Between 1983 and 1987, PEV was part of the United People Alliance, to which the PCP also belonged. For this reason, PEV is often criticized for being an "appendage" of the PCP. People who expressed that opinion include former prime minister José Sócrates.

PEV holds many mandates in local assemblies, but, following the January 2022 election, it lost its parliamentary representation.

== History and general information ==
The Party was founded 1982, originally named the Portuguese Ecologist Movement – Party "The Greens" (Movimento Ecologista Português – Partido "Os Verdes"), by a group of Portuguese citizens interested in the promotion of the ecologist movement in Portuguese society, with the support of the Portuguese Communist Party, including in its founders one of its members, Zita Seabra.

In the end of the 1970s, Earth was facing new ecological problems, such as the greenhouse effect and the depletion of the ozone layer and the lack of awareness of this in Portuguese society, along with the lack of an organized Ecologist movement, led to the foundation of the Ecologist Party "The Greens" in order to put such problems on the political agenda.

The Party created regional groups immediately following its foundation, groups that have continued to grow since then. The growth of the Party throughout the country allowed many members to integrate the electoral lists of the CDU, some being elected to very different tasks. Currently (as of 2022), The PEV has several members elected in Municipal Chambers, in Municipal Assemblies and in Parish Assemblies, but it has no members elected in the Assembly of the Republic (Portuguese parliament). There is some criticism of its close ties to the Communist Party. Given that PEV never stood in elections on its own, some right-wing politicians have gone to the point of nicknaming PEV "The Watermelons – Greens Outside, Reds Inside". However, the official positions of both parties on certain questions can be quite different, of which the stance regarding bullfighting is an example.

The PEV is also present in the National Electoral Commission and also in the National Council of Education. The youth wing of the Party is the Ecolojovem, founded in 1989, which is a founding member of the Federation of Young European Greens.

The PEV edits a newspaper, the Folha Verde (Green Leaf), which received several press prizes for its unique design and style.

The PEV supported the minority Socialist Costa Government (2015–2019) with a confidence and supply agreement.

In the 2022 legislative elections, the PEV lost its remaining parliamentary representation.

== Election results ==
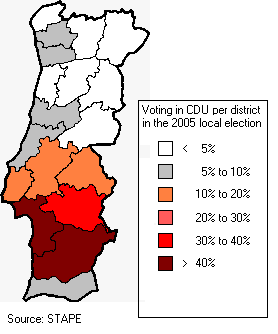
CDU results in the local election of 2005. (Azores and Madeira are not shown)

In elections, the PEV is closely allied with the Portuguese Communist Party, first in the Unitary Democratic Coalition. This explains a nickname given to Os Verdes by some: "melancias" (lit. watermelons): green outside and red inside. The "green" here is a reference to the self-proclaimed ecologist nature of the party, while "red" means "communist".

=== Results in parliamentary elections ===
Election	Leader	Votes	%	Seats	+/-	Government
1983	António Gonzalez	United People Alliance		1 / 250		Opposition
1985	Maria Amélia Santos	United People Alliance		1 / 250	0	Opposition
1987	Herculano Pombo	Unitary Democratic Coalition		2 / 250	▲1	Opposition
1991	Isabel Castro	Unitary Democratic Coalition		2 / 230	0	Opposition
1995	Isabel Castro	Unitary Democratic Coalition		2 / 230	0	Opposition
1999	Isabel Castro	Unitary Democratic Coalition		2 / 230	0	Opposition
2002	Isabel Castro	Unitary Democratic Coalition		2 / 230	0	Opposition
2005	Heloísa Apolónia	Unitary Democratic Coalition		2 / 230	0	Opposition
2009	Heloísa Apolónia	Unitary Democratic Coalition		2 / 230	0	Opposition
2011	Heloísa Apolónia	Unitary Democratic Coalition		2 / 230	0	Opposition
2015	Heloísa Apolónia	Unitary Democratic Coalition		2 / 230	0	Opposition (2015)
2015	Heloísa Apolónia	Unitary Democratic Coalition		2 / 230	0	Confidence and supply
2019	Heloísa Apolónia	Unitary Democratic Coalition		2 / 230	0	Opposition
2022	Heloísa Apolónia	Unitary Democratic Coalition		0 / 230	▼2	No seats
2024	Heloísa Apolónia	Unitary Democratic Coalition		0 / 230	0	No seats
2025	Heloísa Apolónia	Unitary Democratic Coalition		0 / 230	0	No seats

=== Results in local elections ===
Results in Local Elections (year links to election page)
Year	Coalition	Type of Election	Voting	%	Mandates
1985	APU	Local	942,147	19.4%	305
1989	CDU	Local	633,682	12.8%	252
1993	CDU	Local	689,928	12.8%	246
1997	CDU	Local	643,956	12.0%	236
2001	CDU	Local	557,481	10.6%	202
2005	CDU	Local	590,496	11.0%	203
2009	CDU	Local	537,329	9.7%	174
2013	CDU	Local	552,690	11.1%	213
2017	CDU	Local	489,189	9.5%	171
2021	CDU	Local	410,666	8.2%	148

=== European Parliament ===
Election	List leader	Votes	%	Seats	+/–	EP Group
1987		Unitary Democratic Coalition		0 / 24	New	–
1989	Maria Amélia Santos	Unitary Democratic Coalition		1 / 24	▲1	G
1994	Isabel Castro	Unitary Democratic Coalition		0 / 25	▼1	–
1999	Manuela Cunha	Unitary Democratic Coalition		0 / 25	0	–
2004	Heloísa Apolónia	Unitary Democratic Coalition		0 / 24	0	–
2009	Francisco Madeira Lopes	Unitary Democratic Coalition		0 / 22	0	–
2014	Manuela Cunha	Unitary Democratic Coalition		0 / 21	0	–
2019	Mariana Silva	Unitary Democratic Coalition		0 / 21	0	–
2024	Mariana Silva	Unitary Democratic Coalition		0 / 21	0	–

== See also ==
- Green party
- Green politics
- Politics of Portugal
- List of environmental organizations
- List of political parties in Portugal
- Unitary Democratic Coalition
