= Helena Lopes da Silva =

Cape Verdean surgeon and politician (1949–2018)

- Born: 30 January 1949; Cape Verde, Portuguese Empire
- Died: 8 September 2018 (aged 69); Lisbon, Portugal
- Occupations: Surgeon, activist
- Political party: Left Bloc
- Other political affiliations: African Party for the Independence of Cape Verde

Helena Lopes da Silva (30 January 1949 – 8 September 2018) was a Cape Verdean-Portuguese surgeon, feminist and anti-colonialist activist. She was a founder of the Left Bloc and the first black woman to head an electoral list in Portugal.

== Biography ==
Born in Cape Verde to a petty-bourgeois family, Helena stayed in the country until she had completed her secondary education. In 1967, she moved to Portugal to attend university.

=== Political career ===
Helena began her political career when she emigrated to Portugal. In Porto, she joined the student community and became close to a Trotskyist group. She took part in meetings where the struggle for the liberation of the Portuguese colonies was discussed, where political education was promoted and where relations of production, social classes and the proletariat were discussed. She began to receive training in the Cape Verdean national liberation struggle. After two years in Porto, she moved to Lisbon to get closer to her Cape Verdean colleagues. When she arrived in the Portuguese capital, she joined the African Party for the Independence of Guinea and Cape Verde (PAIGC), a clandestine organisation under the Estado Novo.

Helena was also a member of the Internationalist Communist League and its successor, the Revolutionary Socialist Party. In both, Helena continued to fight for feminist causes. An activist for women's rights and the right to voluntary termination of pregnancy, she took part in the creation of the National Campaign for Abortion and Contraception (CNAC), the 'Being a Woman' group, the Movement for a Yes to Decriminalising Abortion and the Doctors for Choice movement.

In the 1994 European Parliament election, Helena led the PSR's candidacy, making her the first black leader of an electoral list in Portuguese elections. Her campaign brought visibility to the issues of racism and xenophobia in Portugal and Europe. In 1999, she was one of the founders of the Left Bloc, among the 248 people who signed the party's founding declaration. Helena was also a member of Cape Verde's Council of State, having joined at the invitation of President Jorge Carlos Fonseca. In 2015, she was honoured with the Second Degree of the Amílcar Cabral Order by the President of the Republic of Cape Verde.

=== Medical career ===
Alongside her political career, Helena graduated in medicine in 1974-75 from the Faculty of Medicine of the University of Lisbon and performed general surgery from 1981 to 1987. She went on to gain a master's degree in Health Management from the National School of Public Health at the NOVA University Lisbon. Between 1982 and 1983, at the invitation of the Board of the Calouste Gulbenkian School of Nursing, she taught Medical-Surgical Pathology and was also a Visiting assistant professor of surgery at the Faculty of Medicine of the University of Lisbon between 1981 and 2016. She was also a Graduate Assistant in Surgery at the Hospital de Santa Maria (1998–2016) and headed the Surgery 1 Outpatient Team for 20 years.

As a lecturer at the Faculty of Medicine of the University of Lisbon, Helena coordinated an extracurricular course on sutures organised by students, the ‘AEFMUL Sutures Workshop’, which she continued to coordinate on a pro-bono basis even after she retired. She was a member of the College of Surgery Speciality of the Portuguese Medical Association from 1993 and also kept in constant contact and collaborated with the Cape Verdean Medical Association and the country's health system. She was also a member of the AEFMUL's Medical Association.

Helena Lopes da Silva died on 8 September 2018, at the age of 69.
