= National Solidarity Party (Portugal) =

Defunct political party in Portugal

National Solidarity Party Partido da Solidariedade Nacional
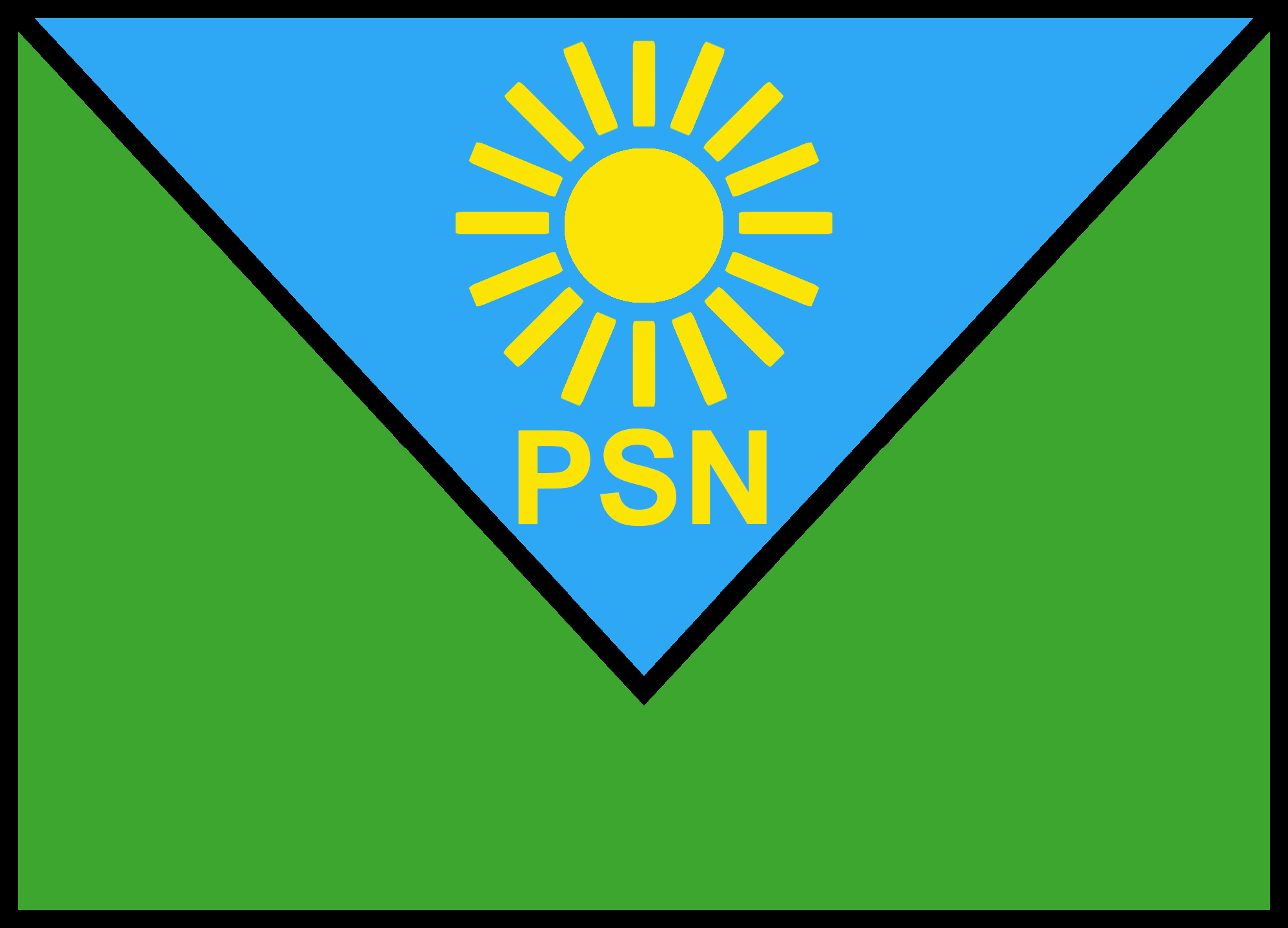
- Founded: 26 July 1990
- Dissolved: 10 January 2006
- Ideology: Humanism; Populism; Pensioners' rights
- Political position: Syncretic

The National Solidarity Party (Portuguese: Partido da Solidariedade Nacional, PSN) was a political party in Portugal.

== History ==
The party was established in 1990 and sought to represent the interests of pensioners. In the 1991 parliamentary elections it received 1.68% of the vote and won a seat in the Assembly of the Republic, taken by its president, Manuel Sérgio. However, its vote share was reduced to just 0.21% in the 1995 elections, resulting in the party losing its seat.

The 1999 elections saw the party's vote share remain at 0.21%. After failing to regain parliamentary representation, it did not contest any further elections, and was declared defunct in 2006.

The party also contested the elections for the European Parliament in 1994 and 1999, winning no seats in both cases.

== Election results ==
=== Assembly of the Republic ===
Election	Votes	%	+/–	Pos	Seats	+/–	Status
1991	96,096	1.68%	—	5th	1 / 230	—	Opposition
1995	12,613	0.21%	▼1.47	8th	0 / 230	▼1	Extraparliamentary
1999	11,488	0.21%	0.0	9th	0 / 230	Steady	Extraparliamentary

=== European Parliament ===
Election	Votes	%	+/–	Pos	Seats	+/–
1994	11,214	0.37%	—	10th	0 / 25	—
1999	8,413	0.24%	▼0.13	9th	0 / 25	Steady
