= Isabel Castro (politician) =

Portuguese Green Party politician

Isabel Maria de Almeida e Castro

Member of the Assembly of the Republic
- In office 1991–2004
- Constituency: Lisbon

Personal details
- Born: 10 June 1954 (age 72)
- Party: Ecologist Party "The Greens"

Isabel Maria de Almeida e Castro (born 1954), is a former deputy in the Assembly of the Republic of Portugal, representing the Ecologist Party "The Greens". She was one of the first two women to head a political party in the parliament.

== Political career ==
Castro was born on 10 June 1954. Before being elected to the National Assembly she had a career as a banker. She was first elected to the Assembly of the Republic in 1991, as a representative of the Greens (Os Verdes) for the Lisbon District. She was re-elected in 1995, 1999, and 2002. In these elections her party only won two seats out of the 230 in the parliament, and she was the president of the parliamentary group until August 2004, when she left the Assembly because of the party's policy of rotating deputies. Following this, she decided not to stand for re-election in the 2005 election, saying that she was disappointed with political parties. She resigned from the governing bodies of the Ecologist party.

Castro did, however, remain an outspoken campaigner on environmental and other issues, such as abortion and nuclear weapons. In 2004, on the 30th anniversary of the Carnation Revolution that overthrew the Estado Novo dictatorship, she highlighted many of the environmental issues that Portugal still faced. These included the bias towards development in coastal areas; the increased production of solid waste with low emphasis on recycling; the pollution of Portuguese rivers; desertification; the extinction of animal and plant species; erosion; increased air pollution and carbon dioxide emissions; and dependency on imported energy and lack of progress with renewable energy production.

Castro has been very critical of the United Nations Climate Change Conferences, saying that they are "chronicles of imminent disaster" with a lack of commitment to action. She has also been involved with the Iniciativa de Auditoria Cidadã à Divida Pública, the Portuguese branch of the International Citizen Debt Audit Network (ICAN). She regularly writes pieces for the media, including for the Green European Journal.
