= Unitary Democratic Coalition =

Unitary Democratic Coalition Coligação Democrática Unitária
- Abbreviation: CDU; PCP–PEV
- Leader: Paulo Raimundo
- Founded: 1987
- Preceded by: United People Alliance
- Headquarters: Rua Soeiro Pereira Gomes 3, 1600-019 Lisboa
- Youth wing: Juventude CDU
- Membership: 48,323 in 2024 (PCP) c. 6,000 in 2007 (PEV)
- Ideology: Communism; Eco-socialism; Social conservatism Hard Euroscepticism
- Political position: Far-left
- European Parliament group: The Left in the European Parliament
- Colours: Blue (official); Red (customary); Pea green (Note: since 2022); Green
- Member parties: PCP; PEV; ID
- Assembly of the Republic: 3 / 230
- European Parliament: 1 / 21
- Regional Parliaments: 0 / 104
- Local government (Mayors): 12 / 308
- Local government (Parishes): 97 / 3,216

Election symbol

Website
- cdu.pt
- Politics of Portugal; Political parties; Elections; A: The alliance is also described as left-conservative, given its more conservative stances on social issues.

The Unitary Democratic Coalition (Portuguese: CDU – Coligação Democrática Unitária, CDU) is an electoral and political coalition between the Portuguese Communist Party (Portuguese: Partido Comunista Português or PCP) and the Ecologist Party "The Greens" (Portuguese: Partido Ecologista "Os Verdes" or PEV). The coalition also integrates the political movement Democratic Intervention (Portuguese: Intervenção Democrática or ID).

The coalition was formed in 1987 in order to run to the simultaneous legislative election and European Parliament election that were held on July 19 of that year. It achieved its best result in the 1987 elections both nationally and locally. From 1991 until 2019, the party consistently won between six and ten percent of the national vote in elections to the Assembly of the Republic until 2022 and 2024, in which the coalition dropped below 5% nationally for the first time. The coalition supported the minority Socialist Costa Government from 2015 until 2019 with a confidence and supply agreement.

== History ==
Since the beginning of the coalition, the member parties have never participated separately in any election. The Communist Party is the major force of the coalition and has the majority of places in the electoral lists while the Greens are a smaller party. For example, the Greens were responsible for 2 members of parliament among the 17 elected by the coalition in the 2015 legislative election. Each party has its own parliamentary group and counts as a separate party in official issues.

Along with the Left Bloc, the coalition supported the minority Socialist Costa Government from 2015 until 2019 under a confidence and supply agreement. This was known as the "Geringonça" (Contraption) deal, a setup that Prime minister António Costa decided to end following the 2019 elections.

In the 2022 election, the CDU won six seats while the Greens achieved zero seats. In the 2024 election, the CDU won four seats and the Greens zero, with the coalition achieving just 3.3 percent of the votes. In 2024, the coalition lost their historic seat in the Beja district and for the first time lost all MPs in the Alentejo region.

== Symbol ==
The present symbol of CDU shows the PCP's symbol and the PEV's symbol, a hammer and sickle and a sunflower, respectively, with the respective names below. That symbol replaced a former one that featured three hexagons with the inscription: CDU and was often used with a beehive. That was sometimes said to mean that CDU worked just like a bee (collectively and every day) and the hexagons were meant to represent the cell-based Leninist organization of the PCP.

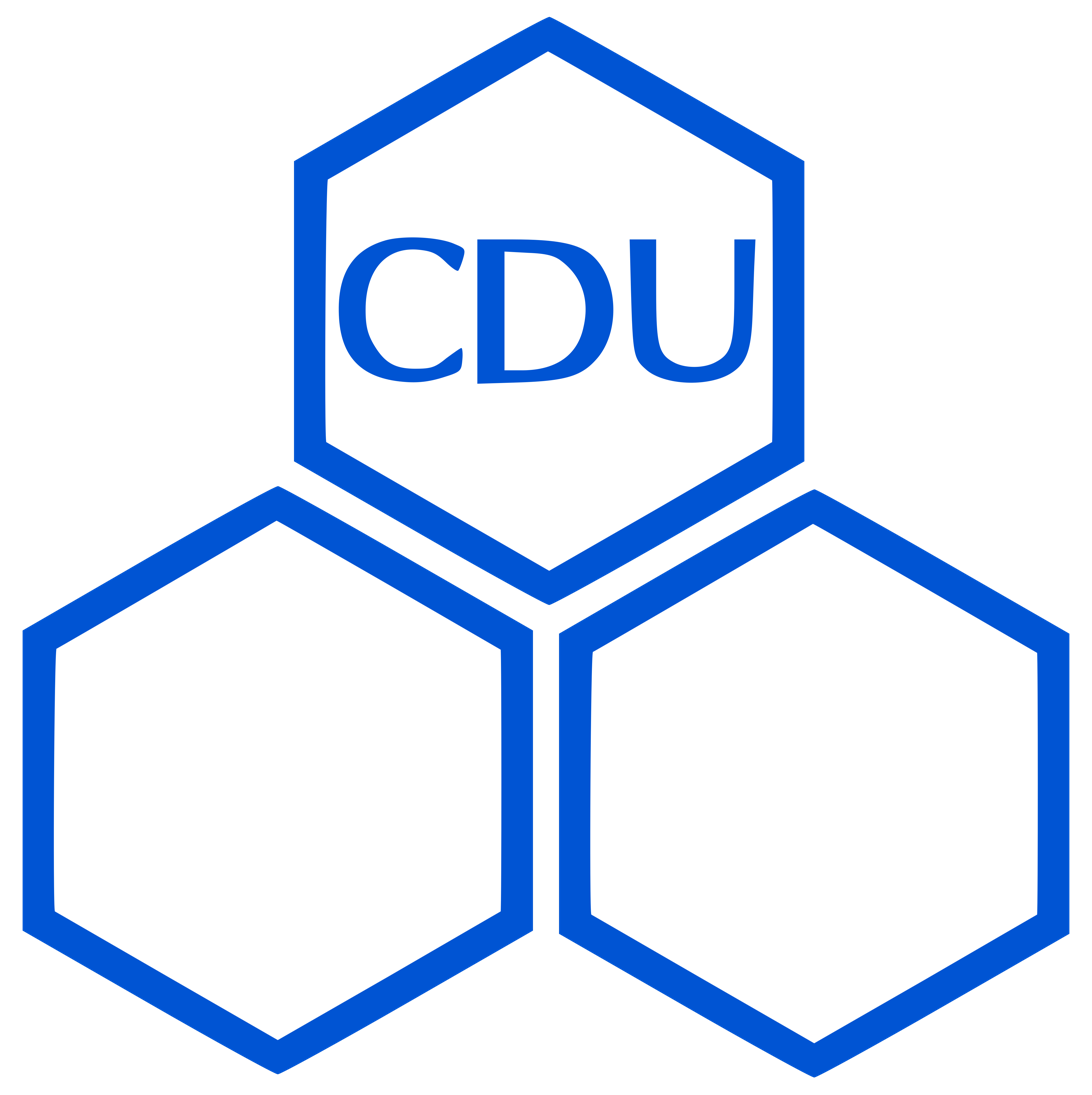
Coalition logo in 1987.

Current logo of the coalition.

== Youth organization ==
The coalition has a youth wing, called Juventude CDU, that develops political work in youth related subjects, along with youth-oriented activities, mainly during the electoral campaigns. The Juventude CDU is mainly composed by members of the youth wings of the parties that compose the CDU, the Portuguese Communist Youth and the Ecolojovem.

== Election results ==
=== Assembly of the Republic ===
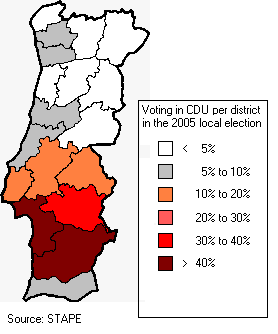
CDU results in the local election of 2005. (Azores and Madeira are not shown)

Vote share in the Portuguese legislative elections

Election	Leader	Votes	%	Seats	+/-	Government
1987	Álvaro Cunhal	689,137	12.1 (#3)	31 / 250	▼7	Opposition
1991	Álvaro Cunhal	504,583	8.8 (#3)	17 / 230	▼14	Opposition
1995	Carlos Carvalhas	506,157	8.6 (#4)	15 / 230	▼2	Opposition
1999	Carlos Carvalhas	487,058	9.0 (#3)	17 / 230	▲2	Opposition
2002	Carlos Carvalhas	379,870	6.9 (#4)	12 / 230	▼5	Opposition
2005	Jerónimo de Sousa	433,369	7.5 (#3)	14 / 230	▲2	Opposition
2009	Jerónimo de Sousa	446,279	7.9 (#5)	15 / 230	▲1	Opposition
2011	Jerónimo de Sousa	441,147	7.9 (#4)	16 / 230	▲1	Opposition
2015	Jerónimo de Sousa	445,901	8.3 (#4)	17 / 230	▲1	Opposition (2015)
2015	Jerónimo de Sousa	445,901	8.3 (#4)	17 / 230	▲1	Confidence and supply (2015–2019)
2019	Jerónimo de Sousa	332,018	6.3 (#4)	12 / 230	▼5	Opposition
2022	Jerónimo de Sousa	238,920	4.3 (#5)	6 / 230	▼6	Opposition
2024	Paulo Raimundo	205,551	3.2 (#6)	4 / 230	▼2	Opposition
2025	Paulo Raimundo	183,686	2.9 (#6)	3 / 230	▼1	Opposition

=== Presidential ===
Election	Candidate	Votes	%	Result
1991	Carlos Carvalhas	635,867	12.9 (#3)	Lost ✗
1996	Jerónimo de Sousa	Withdrew		
2001	António Simões de Abreu	221,886	5.1 (#3)	Lost ✗
2006	Jerónimo de Sousa	466,428	8.6 (#4)	Lost ✗
2011	Francisco Lopes	300,921	7.1 (#4)	Lost ✗
2016	Edgar Silva	183,051	3.9 (#5)	Lost ✗
2021	João Ferreira	180,518	4.3 (#4)	Lost ✗
2026	António Filipe	92,644	1.6 (#7)	Lost ✗

=== European Parliament ===
CDU sticker: Schedule and alert your friends: on 13 June (1999), Vote CDU to the European Parliament

Election	Leader	Votes	%	Seats	+/–	EP Group
1987	Ângelo Veloso	648,700	11.5 (#4)	3 / 24		COM
1989	Carlos Carvalhas	597,759	14.4 (#3)	4 / 24	▲1	EUL / G
1994	Luis Sá	340,725	11.2 (#4)	3 / 25	▼1	GUE/NGL
1999	Ilda Figueiredo	357,671	10.3 (#3)	2 / 25	▼1	GUE/NGL
2004	Ilda Figueiredo	309,401	9.1 (#3)	2 / 24	0	GUE/NGL
2009	Ilda Figueiredo	379,787	10.6 (#4)	2 / 22	0	GUE/NGL
2014	João Ferreira	416,925	12.7 (#3)	3 / 21	▲1	GUE/NGL
2019	João Ferreira	228,045	6.9 (#4)	2 / 21	▼1	The Left
2024	João Oliveira	162,630	4.1 (#6)	1 / 21	▼1	The Left

=== Regional Assemblies ===
Region	Election	Leader	Votes	%	Seats	+/-	Government
Azores	2024	Marco Varela	1,823	1.6 (#7)	0 / 57	0	No seats
Madeira	2025	Edgar Silva	2,543	1.8 (#7)	0 / 47	0	No seats

=== Local elections ===
Election	Leader	Votes	%	Councillors	+/-	Mayors	+/-
1989	Álvaro Cunhal	633,682	12.8 (#3)	253 / 1,997		50 / 305	
1993	Carlos Carvalhas	689,928	12.8 (#3)	246 / 2,015	▼7	49 / 305	▼1
1997	Carlos Carvalhas	643,956	12.0 (#3)	236 / 2,021	▼10	41 / 305	▼8
2001	Carlos Carvalhas	557,481	10.6 (#3)	202 / 2,044	▼34	28 / 308	▼13
2005	Jerónimo de Sousa	590,598	11.0 (#3)	203 / 2,046	▲1	32 / 308	▲4
2009	Jerónimo de Sousa	537,329	9.7 (#3)	174 / 2,078	▼29	28 / 308	▼4
2013	Jerónimo de Sousa	552,506	11.1 (#3)	213 / 2,086	▲39	34 / 308	▲6
2017	Jerónimo de Sousa	489,189	9.5 (#3)	171 / 2,074	▼42	24 / 308	▼10
2021	Jerónimo de Sousa	410,666	8.2 (#3)	148 / 2,064	▼23	19 / 308	▼5
2025	Paulo Raimundo	316,273	5.7 (#4)	93 / 2,058	▼55	12 / 308	▼7
