= 1989 European Parliament election in Portugal =

- 18 June 1989

24 seats to the European Parliament
- Turnout: 51.1% ▼21.3 pp
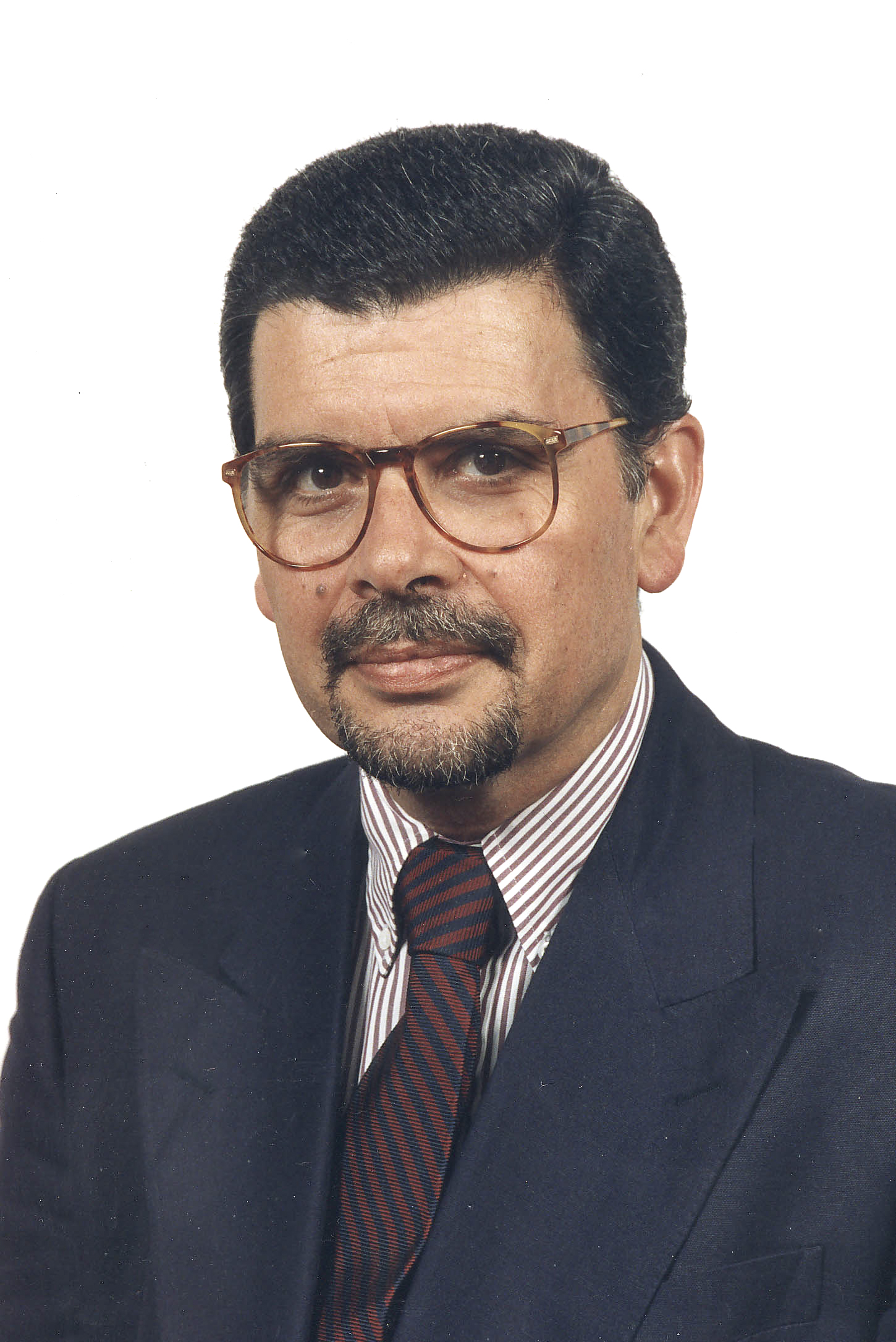

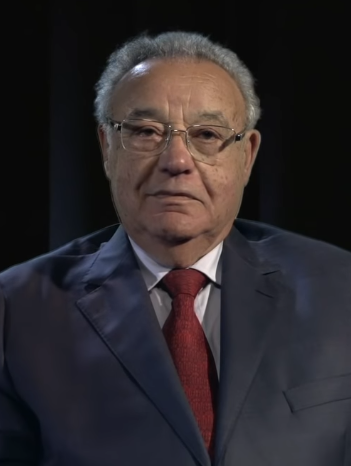

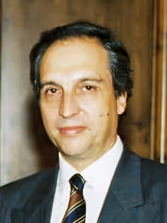

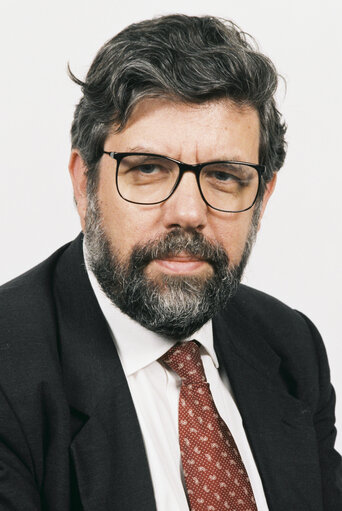
	First party	Second party
Leader	António Capucho	João Cravinho
Party	PSD	PS
Alliance	ALDE	PES
Last election	10 seats, 37.9%	6 seats, 22.5%
Seats won	9	8
Seat change	▼1	▲2
Popular vote	1,358,958	1,184,380
Percentage	32.8%	28.5%
Swing	▼4.7 pp	▲6.3 pp
	Third party	Fourth party
Leader	Carlos Carvalhas	Francisco Lucas Pires
Party	CDU	CDS
Alliance	COM	EPP
Last election	3 seats, 11.5%	4 seats, 15.4%
Seats won	4	3
Seat change	▲1	▼1
Popular vote	597,759	587,497
Percentage	14.4%	14.2%
Swing	▲2.9 pp	▼1.3 pp

An election of MEP representing Portugal constituency for the 1989-1994 term of the European Parliament was held on 18 June 1989. It was part of the wider 1989 European election.

The Social Democratic Party (PSD) won the elections with almost 33 percent of the votes, but lost a lot of ground compared with 1987. Although the country was experiencing a significant economic growth at that time, the PSD saw the gap between them and the Socialists narrow to around 4 percentage points. On the other hand, the Socialist Party (PS), although failing to topple the PSD as the largest party, performed quite well gaining more than 6% of the votes and polling above 28 percent, compared with the 22 percent in 1987. They also gained 2 MEPs, while the PSD lost one.

The Democratic Unity Coalition (CDU) also performed very well, winning 14 percent and becoming the third political force. The Communist/Green alliance was also able to win one more MEP than in 1987. CDS saw its share of vote drop a bit, to also 14 percent, and was surpassed by CDU, falling to fourth place.

Turnout fell dramatically in these election, with just 51 percent of voters casting a ballot.

== Electoral System ==
The voting method used, for the election of European members of parliament, is by proportional representation using the d'Hondt method, which is known to benefit leading parties. In the 1989 EU elections, Portugal had 24 seats to be filled. Deputies are elected in a single constituency, corresponding to the entire national territory.

== Parties and candidates ==
The major parties that partook in the election, and their EP list leaders, were:

- Democratic Unity Coalition (CDU), Carlos Carvalhas
- Socialist Party (PS), João Cravinho
- Social Democratic Party (PSD), António Capucho
- Democratic and Social Centre (CDS), Francisco Lucas Pires
- People's Monarchist Party (PPM), Miguel Esteves Cardoso
- Portuguese Democratic Movement (MDP/CDE), António Victorino de Almeida
- Popular Democratic Union (UDP), Luís Fazenda
- Portuguese Workers' Communist Party (PCTP/MRPP), António Garcia Pereira
- Workers' Party of Socialist Unity (POUS), Carmelinda Pereira

== Campaign period ==
=== Party slogans ===
Party or alliance	Original slogan	English translation	Refs
PSD	« Ganhar 92 »	"Win 92"	
PS	« Vamos mudar Portugal para Portugal ganhar »	"Let's change Portugal for Portugal to win"	
CDS	« Com Lucas Pires, no coração da Europa »	"With Lucas Pires, at the heart of Europe!"	
CDU	« CDU: é melhor para Portugal »	"CDU: it's better for Portugal"	

=== Candidates' debates ===
1989 European Parliament election in Portugal debates
Date	Organisers	Moderator(s)	P Present A Absent invitee N Non-invitee				
Date	Organisers	Moderator(s)	PSD Capucho	PS Cravinho	CDS Pires	CDU Carvalhas	Refs
22 May	RTP1	António Amaral Pais	P	P	P	P	

== Results ==
Party and European Parliament group		Votes	%	+/–	Seats	+/–
Social Democratic Party	LDR	1,358,958	32.75	–4.70	9	–1
Socialist Party (Note: The Socialist Party list included 1 MP elected by the Democratic Renewal Party.)	SOC	1,184,380	28.54	+6.26	8	+2
Unitary Democratic Coalition	EUL	597,759	14.40	+2.90	3	0
Unitary Democratic Coalition	G	597,759	14.40	+2.90	1	+1
Democratic and Social Centre	EPP	587,497	14.16	–1.34	3	–1
People's Monarchist Party	NI	84,272	2.03	–0.74	0	0
Portuguese Democratic Movement	NI	56,900	1.37	+0.88	0	0
Popular Democratic Union	NI	45,017	1.08	+0.14	0	0
Revolutionary Socialist Party	NI	31,775	0.77	+0.26	0	0
Christian Democratic Party	NI	29,745	0.72	0.00	0	0
Portuguese Workers' Communist Party	NI	26,682	0.64	+0.29	0	0
Workers' Party of Socialist Unity	NI	11,182	0.27	New	0	New
Left Revolutionary Front	NI	7,833	0.19	New	0	New
Total		4,022,000	100.00	–	24	0
Valid votes		4,022,000	96.92	–0.55		
Invalid votes		61,682	1.49	+0.17		
Blank votes		66,074	1.59	+0.38		
Total votes		4,149,756	100.00	–		
Registered voters/turnout		8,121,564	51.10	–21.32		
Source: Comissão Nacional de Eleições

Vote share
PSD	32.75%
PS	28.54%
CDU	14.41%
CDS	14.16%
PPM	2.03%
MDP/CDE	1.37%
UDP	1.09%
PSR	0.77%
PDC	0.72%
PCTP/MRPP	0.64%
Others	0.46%
Blank/Invalid	3.08%

Vote share
PSD	37.50%
PS	33.33%
CDU	16.67%
CDS	12.50%

=== Distribution by European group ===
Summary of political group distribution in the 3rd European Parliament (1989–1994)
Groups	Parties	Seats	Total	%
Liberal Democrat and Reform Party (LDR)	Social Democratic Party (PSD)	9	9	37.50
Socialist Group (SOC)	Socialist Party (PS)	8	8	33.33
European United Left (EUL)	Portuguese Communist Party (PCP)	3	3	12.50
European People's Party (EPP)	Democratic and Social Centre (CDS)	3	3	12.50
The Green Group in the European Parliament (G)	Ecologist Party (PEV)	1	1	4.17
Total		24	24	100.00

=== Maps ===
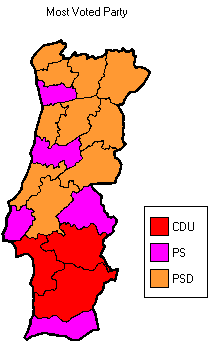
Most voted political force by district. (Azores and Madeira not shown)

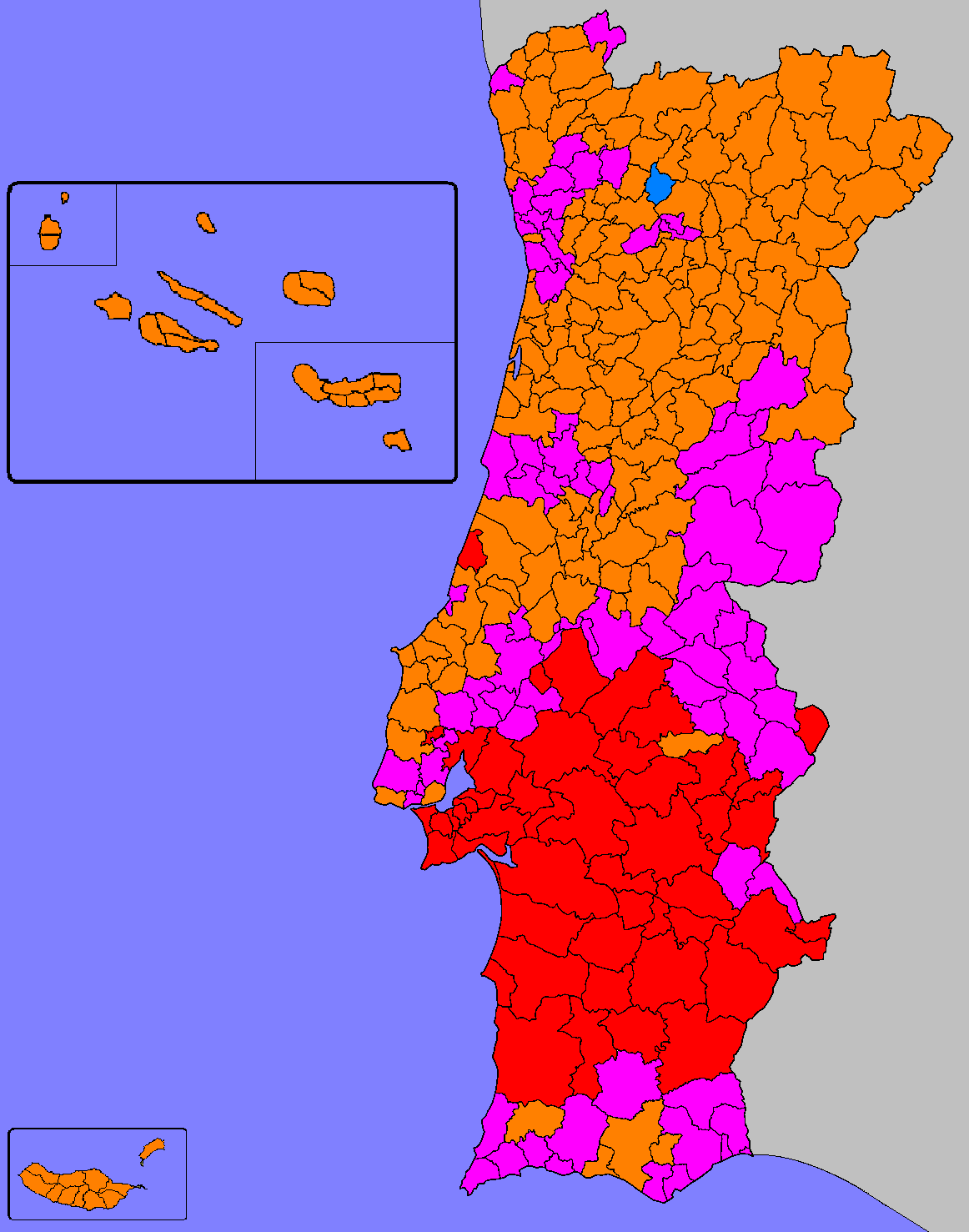
Most voted political force by municipality.

== See also ==
- Politics of Portugal
- List of political parties in Portugal
- Elections in Portugal
- European Parliament
