= Politics XXI =

Politics XXI Política XXI
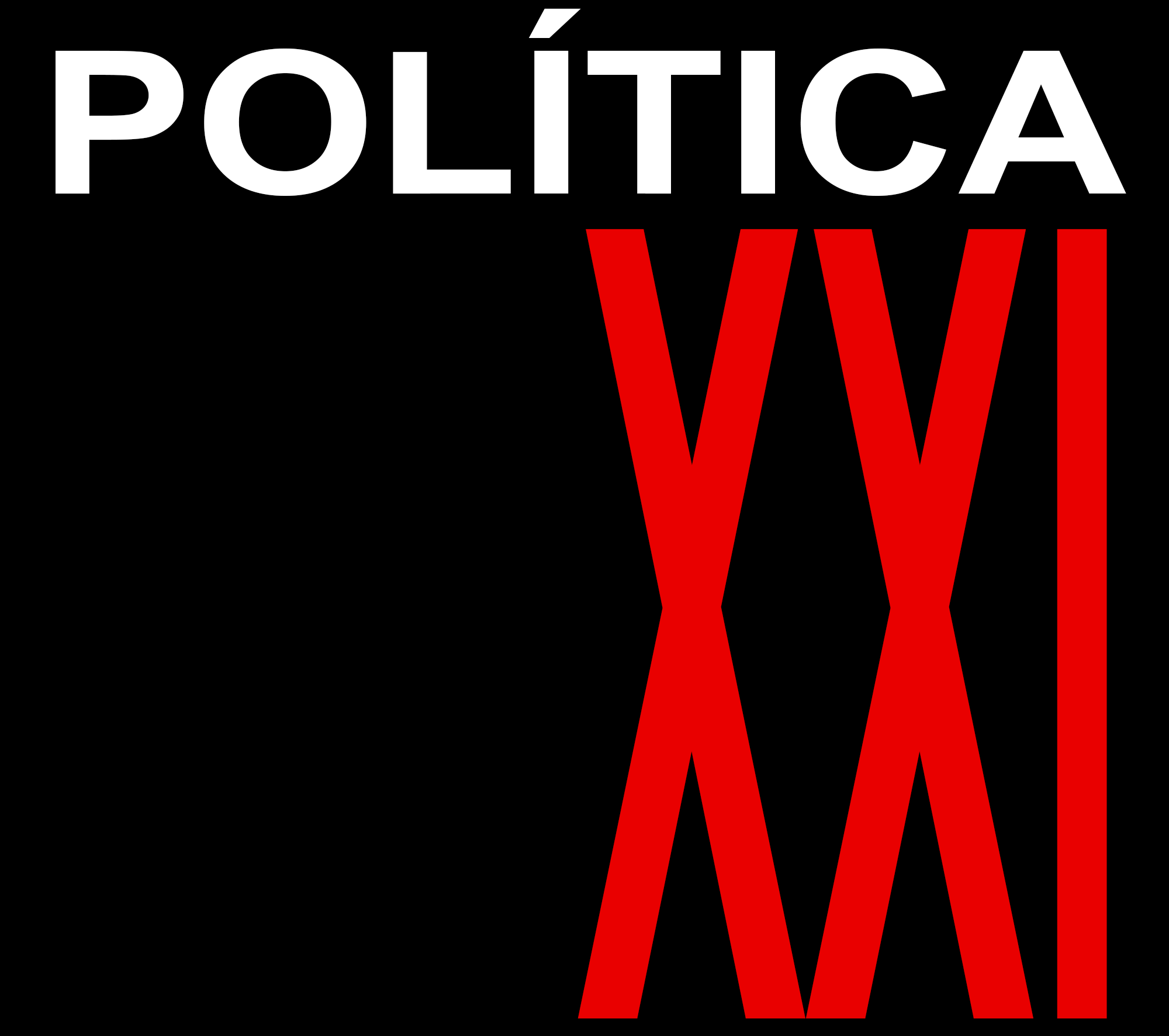
- Founded: 16 December 1994
- Dissolved: 2 April 2008
- Preceded by: Portuguese Democratic Movement
- Merged into: Left Bloc
- Headquarters: Lisbon
- Think tank: Fórum Manifesto
- Ideology: Democratic socialism Progressivism
- Political position: Left-wing
- Colours: Red

The Politics XXI (Portuguese: Política XXI) was a Portuguese left-wing political party. It was founded by former members of the Portuguese Communist Party and the Portuguese Democratic Movement/Democratic Electoral Commissions.

In 1998, the party decided to merge with other political left parties in order to found the Left Bloc. On 2 April 2008, the party was dissolved due to the good results obtained by the Left Bloc, and became the political association Fórum Manifesto.

== Electoral results ==
=== European Parliament ===
Election	Leader	Votes	%	Seats	+/-
1994	Ivan Nunes	12,402	0.4 (#9)	0 / 25	
