= 2009 European Parliament election in Portugal =

- 7 June 2009

22 seats to the European Parliament
- Turnout: 36.8% ▼1.8 pp
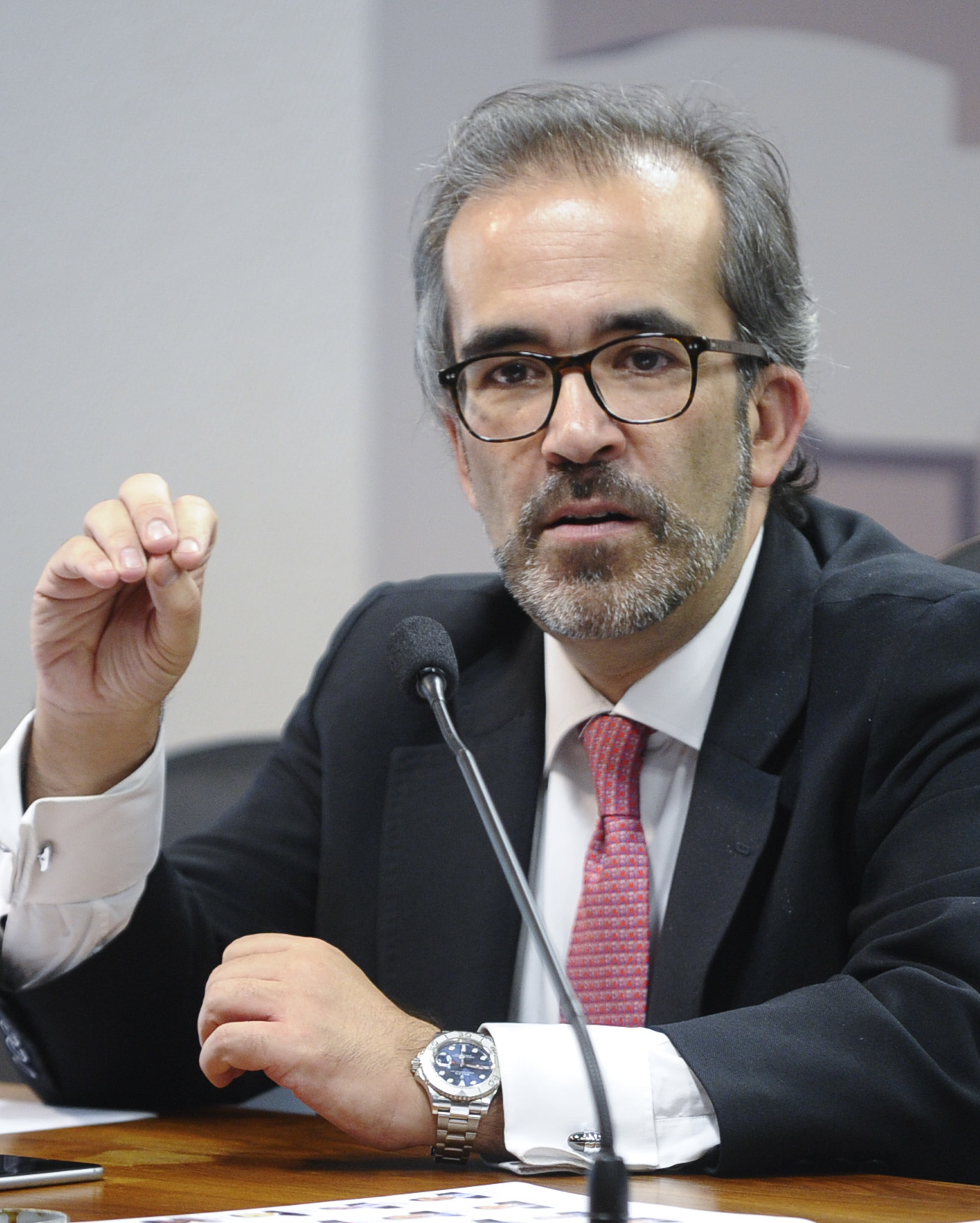

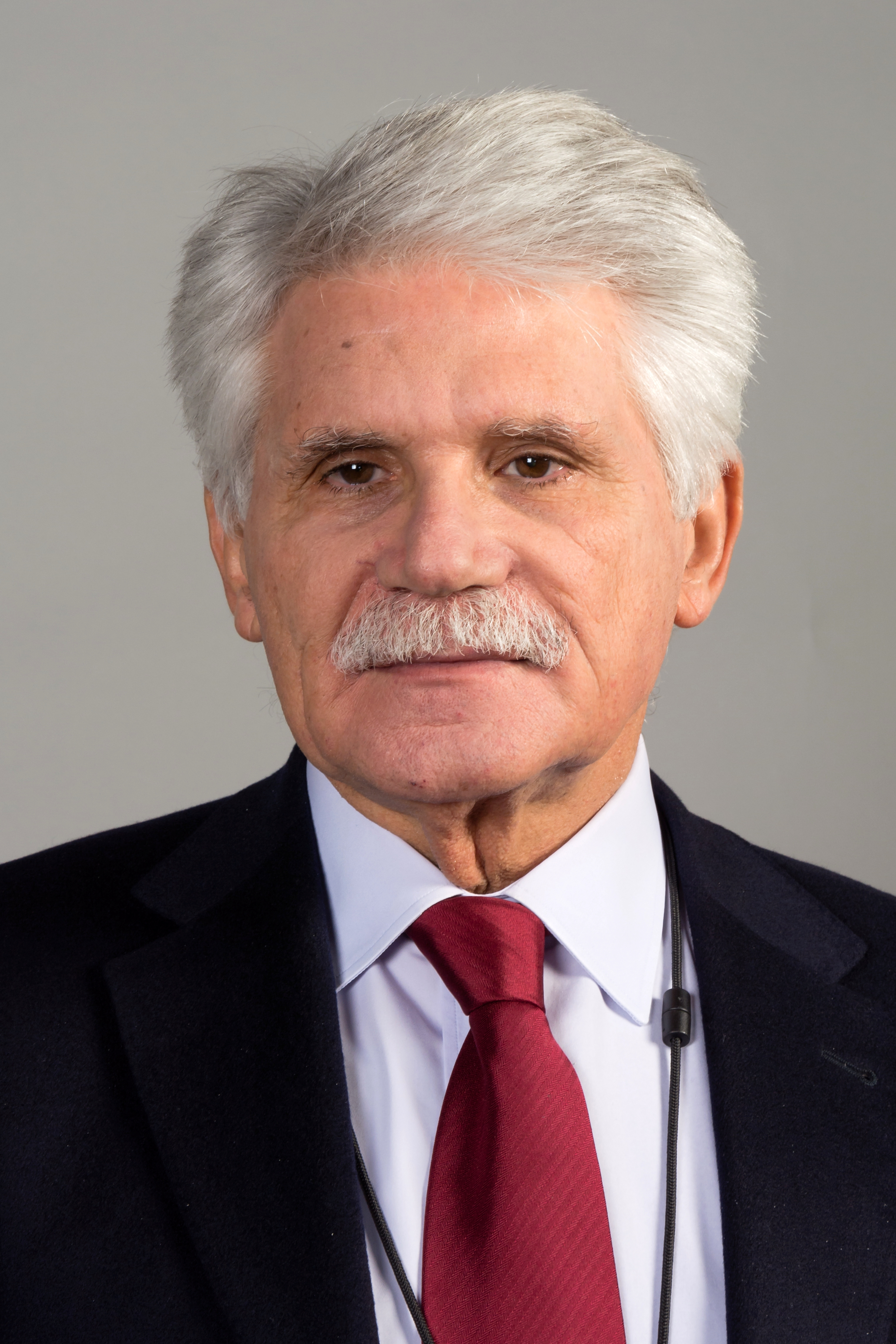

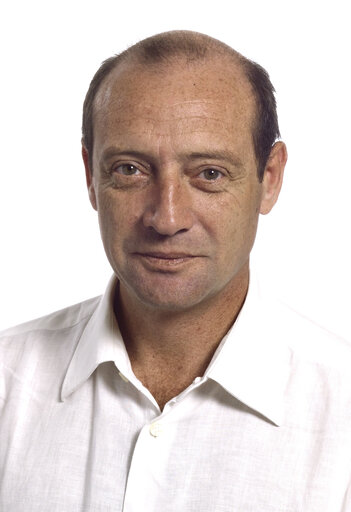

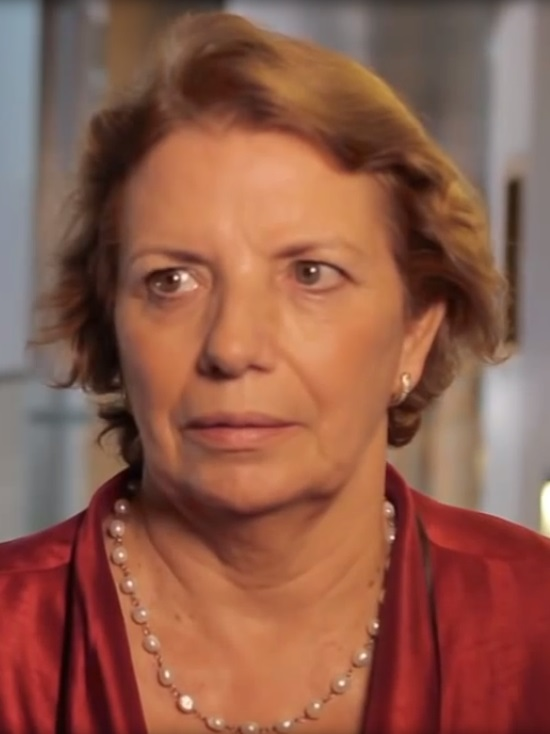

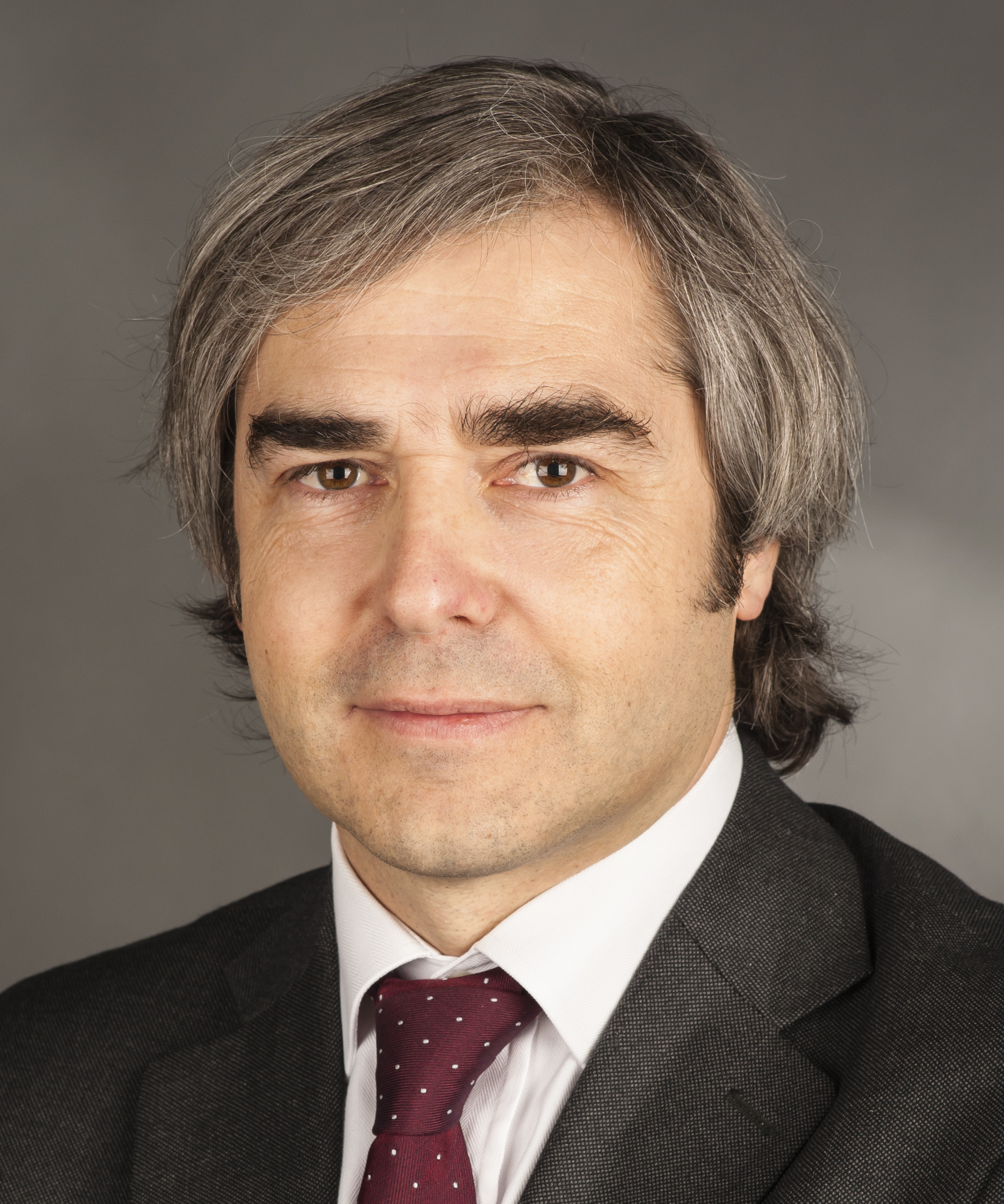
| | First party | Second party | Third party |
|---|---|---|---|
| Leader | Paulo Rangel | Vital Moreira | Miguel Portas |
| Party | PSD | PS | BE |
| Alliance | EPP | PES | EACL |
| Last election | 7 seats (FP) | 12 seats, 44.5% | 1 seat, 4.9% |
| Seats won | 8 | 7 | 3 |
| Seat change | ▲1 | ▼5 | ▲2 |
| Popular vote | 1,131,744 | 946,818 | 382,667 |
| Percentage | 31.7% | 26.5% | 10.7% |
| Swing | (Note: The Social Democratic Party and the People's Party contested, together, the 2004 election in a coalition (Forward Portugal).) | ▼18.0 pp | ▲5.8 pp |
| | Fourth party | Fifth party |
| Leader | Ilda Figueiredo | Nuno Melo |
| Party | CDU | CDS–PP |
| Alliance | GUE/NGL | EPP |
| Last election | 2 seats, 9.1% | 2 seats (FP) |
| Seats won | 2 | 2 |
| Seat change | 0 | 0 |
| Popular vote | 379,787 | 298,423 |
| Percentage | 10.6% | 8.4% |
| Swing | ▲1.5 pp |

An election of the delegation from Portugal to the European Parliament was held on 7 June 2009.

In a surprise upset, the Social Democrats (PSD) were the big winners of this election, debunking forecasts of a very complicated result for then PSD leader, Manuela Ferreira Leite, just a few months before the legislative election. The PSD won 31.7 percent of the vote and 8 seats. It was the first victory of the PSD, in a European election, since 1989. On the other hand, the election was a huge setback for the Socialist Party (PS), which lost almost 18 percentage points. Basically all predictions that pointed to a rather safe PS victory in the election were wrong. As a result, the party lost five of its twelve European Parliament members. The People's Party (CDS-PP) also had a surprising result, winning 8 percent of the vote and electing two European Parliament members. Both PSD and CDS-PP, which ran in a joint list in 2004, increased considerably their scores and together won more than 40 percent of the vote and 10 European Parliament members.

On the left, both the Left Bloc (BE) and Democratic Unity Coalition (CDU) achieved very good results, with the historic fact of BE surpassing CDU in both votes and seats for the first time, although only just. Both parties increased their scores at the expense of the Socialist Party. The Left Bloc won 10.7 percent of the vote and three European Parliament members, their best score in EU elections to date, and CDU surpassed once again the 10 percent mark winning 10.6 percent of the vote, but maintaining the two European Parliament members they got in 2004.

Turnout in the elections was quite low, as only 36.78 percent of the electorate cast a ballot, a slightly lower share than in the 2004 election. However, the number of ballots cast was higher than in 2004, and the number of registered voters increased considerably in these elections, making the final turnout share lower than in 2004.

== Electoral system ==
The voting method used, for the election of European members of parliament, is by proportional representation using the d'Hondt method, which is known to benefit leading parties. In the 2009 European Union elections, Portugal had 22 seats to be filled. Deputies are elected in a single constituency, corresponding to the entire national territory. Changes to the electoral registration system, approved in 2008, which made registration automatic based on each voter's Identity card, led to a significant increase in the number of registered voters, from 8,8 million in 2004 to 9,7 million in 2009.

== Parties and candidates ==
The lists were headed by

- Socialist Party (Partido Socialista, PS): Vital Moreira
- Social Democratic Party (Partido Social Democrata, PSD): Paulo Rangel
- Democratic Unity Coalition (Coligação Democrática Unitária, CDU): Ilda Figueiredo
- CDS – People's Party (CDS – Partido Popular, CDS–PP): Nuno Melo
- Left Bloc (Bloco de Esquerda, BE): Miguel Portas
- Portuguese Workers' Communist Party/Reorganized Movement of the Party of the Proletariat (Partido Comunista dos Trabalhadores Portugueses / Movimento Reorganizativo do Partido do Proletariado, PCTP/MRPP): Orlando Alves
- Earth Party (Partido da Terra, MPT): Pedro Quartin Graça
- Hope for Portugal Movement (Movimento Esperança Portugal, MEP): Laurinda Alves
- People's Monarchist Party (Partido Popular Monárquico, PPM): Frederico Carvalho
- Merit and Society Movement (Movimento Mérito e Sociedade, MMS): Carlos Gomes
- National Renovator Party (Partido Nacional Renovador, PNR): Humberto Nuno de Oliveira
- Humanist Party (Partido Humanista, PH): Manuela Magno
- Workers Party of Socialist Unity (Partido Operário de Unidade Socialista, POUS): Carmelinda Pereira

== Campaign period ==
=== Party slogans ===
| Party or alliance | Original slogan | English translation | Refs |
|---|---|---|---|
| PS | « Nós, Europeus » | "We, Europeans" | |
| PSD | « Assina por baixo? » | "Will you sign below?" | |
| CDU | « Em Portugal e na Europa » | "In Portugal and in Europe" | |
| CDS–PP | « Soluções sérias para Portugal » | "Serious solutions for Portugal" | |
| BE | « Está na hora » | "It's time" | |

=== Candidates' debates ===
2004 European Parliament election in Portugal debates
| Date | Organisers | Moderator(s) | P Present A Absent invitee N Non-invitee | | | | | |
| Date | Organisers | Moderator(s) | PS Moreira | PSD Rangel | CDU Figueiredo | CDS–PP Melo | BE Portas | Refs |
|---|---|---|---|---|---|---|---|---|
| 17 April | RTP1 | Fátima Campos Ferreira | P | P | P | P | P | |
| 24 April | SIC Notícias | Clara de Sousa | P | P | N | N | N | |
| 14 May | TVI24 | Paulo Magalhães | P | P | P | P | P | |
| 21 May | TVI24 | Paulo Magalhães | P | P | N | N | N | |

== Opinion polling ==
Exit polls from the three major television networks in Portugal, RTP1, SIC and TVI were given precisely at 20:00 pm (local time) on 7 June 2009.

Exit poll

| Polling firm/Link | Date Released | PS | PSD | CDS–PP | CDU | BE | O | Lead |
|---|---|---|---|---|---|---|---|---|
| 2009 EP election | 7 June 2009 | 26.5; 7 | 31.7; 8 | 8.4; 2 | 10.6; 2 | 10.7; 3 | 12.1; 0 | 5.2 |
| CESOP–UCP | 7 June 2009 | 28–33; 7/8 | 29–34; 8/9 | 7–10; 2 | 9–12; 2/3 | 9–12; 2 | — | 1 |
| Eurosondagem | 7 June 2009 | 27.7–31.5; 7/8 | 29.2–33.0; 7/8 | 7.5–9.3; 2 | 9.5– 11.3; 2/3 | 11.6–13.4; 3 | — | 1.5 |
| Intercampus | 7 June 2009 | 24.1–28.1; 6/8 | 30.4–34.4; 8/9 | 6.7– 9.3; 1/2 | 9.7–12.7; 2/3 | 9.8–12.8; 2/3 | — | 6.3 |
| CESOP–UCP | 5 June 2009 | 34; 9 | 32; 8 | 4; 1 | 11; 2 | 9; 2 | 10; 0 | 2 |
| Eurosondagem | 5 June 2009 | 36.0 | 31.9 | 6.1 | 9.0 | 10.1 | 6.9 | 4.1 |
| Aximage | 4 June 2009 | 36.2 | 30.9 | 5.0 | 10.1 | 10.2 | 7.6 | 5.3 |
| Marktest | 4 June 2009 | 29.4 | 32.5 | 3.3 | 8.9 | 8.9 | 17.0 | 3.1 |
| Marktest | 1 June 2009 | 31.9 | 30.1 | 4.7 | 7.1 | 7.1 | 19.1 | 1.8 |
| Intercampus | 29 May 2009 | 37.1 | 32.0 | 3.5 | 7.7 | 9.9 | 9.8 | 5.1 |
| Eurosondagem | 29 May 2009 | 35.5 | 32.5 | 6.5 | 9.2 | 8.8 | 7.5 | 3.0 |
| Aximage | 26 May 2009 | 38.0 | 31.1 | 6.3 | 7.9 | 8.5 | 8.2 | 6.9 |
| Eurosondagem | 22 May 2009 | 34.3; 8/9 | 32.1; 8 | 6.9; 1/2 | 8.9; 2 | 10.1; 2 | 7.7; 0 | 2.2 |
| Aximage | 17 May 2009 | 38.5 | 32.3 | 5.6 | 8.7 | 9.2 | 5.7 | 6.2 |
| Marktest | 9 May 2009 | 33.1 | 32.9 | 4.5 | 7.6 | 8.4 | 13.5 | 0.2 |
| CESOP–UCP | 1 May 2009 | 39 | 36 | 4 | 7 | 12 | 2 | 3 |
| Intercampus | 24 April 2009 | 34.0 | 33.5 | 6.9 | 7.9 | 18.0 | —N/a | 0.5 |
| 2004 EP election | 13 June 2004 | 44.5; 12 | 33.3; 9 | | 9.1; 2 | 4.9; 1 | 8.2; 0 | 11.2 |

== Voter turnout ==
The table below shows voter turnout throughout election day including voters from Overseas.

| Turnout | Time | | | | | | | | |
| Turnout | 12:00 | | | 16:00 | | | 19:00 | | |
| Turnout | 2004 | 2009 | ± | 2004 | 2009 | ± | 2004 | 2009 | ± |
|---|---|---|---|---|---|---|---|---|---|
| Total | 14.20% | 11.86% | ▼2.34 pp | 27.19% | 26.82% | ▼0.37 pp | 38.60% | 36.78% | ▼1.82 pp |

== Results ==
| Party and European Parliament group | | Votes | % | +/– | Seats | +/– |
|---|---|---|---|---|---|---|
| Social Democratic Party | EPP | 1,131,744 | 31.71 | | 8 | +1 |
| Socialist Party | S&D | 946,818 | 26.53 | –17.99 | 7 | –5 |
| Left Bloc | GUE/NGL | 382,667 | 10.72 | +5.81 | 3 | +1 |
| Unitary Democratic Coalition | GUE/NGL | 379,787 | 10.64 | +1.55 | 2 | 0 |
| CDS – People's Party | EPP | 298,423 | 8.36 | | 2 | 0 |
| Hope for Portugal Movement | NI | 55,072 | 1.54 | New | 0 | New |
| Portuguese Workers' Communist Party | NI | 42,940 | 1.20 | +0.13 | 0 | 0 |
| Earth Party | ELDR | 24,062 | 0.67 | +0.27 | 0 | 0 |
| Merit and Society Movement | NI | 21,738 | 0.61 | New | 0 | New |
| Humanist Party | NI | 17,139 | 0.48 | +0.09 | 0 | 0 |
| People's Monarchist Party | NI | 14,414 | 0.40 | –0.05 | 0 | 0 |
| National Renewal Party | NI | 13,214 | 0.37 | +0.12 | 0 | 0 |
| Workers' Party of Socialist Unity | NI | 5,177 | 0.15 | +0.02 | 0 | 0 |
| Total | | 3,333,195 | 100.00 | – | 22 | –2 |
| Valid votes | | 3,333,195 | 93.39 | –2.65 | | |
| Invalid votes | | 69,918 | 1.96 | +0.57 | | |
| Blank votes | | 165,830 | 4.65 | +2.08 | | |
| Total votes | | 3,568,943 | 100.00 | – | | |
| Registered voters/turnout | | 9,704,559 | 36.78 | –1.82 | | |
Source: Comissão Nacional de Eleições

Vote share
| PSD | 31.71% |
| PS | 26.53% |
| BE | 10.72% |
| CDU | 10.64% |
| CDS-PP | 8.36% |
| MEP | 1.54% |
| PCTP/MRPP | 1.20% |
| MPT | 0.67% |
| MMS | 0.61% |
| Others | 1.40% |
| Blank/Invalid | 6.61% |

Seats
| PSD | 36.36% |
| PS | 31.82% |
| BE | 13.64% |
| CDU | 9.09% |
| CDS-PP | 9.09% |

=== Distribution by European group ===
Summary of political group distribution in the 7th European Parliament (2009–2014)
| Groups | Parties | Seats | Total | % |
|---|---|---|---|---|
| European People's Party (EPP) | Social Democratic Party (PSD); People's Party (CDS–PP) | 8; 2 | 10 | 45.45 |
| Progressive Alliance of Socialists and Democrats (S&D) | Socialist Party (PS) | 7 | 7 | 31.82 |
| European United Left–Nordic Green Left (GUE/NGL) | Left Bloc (BE); Portuguese Communist Party (PCP) | 3; 2 | 5 | 22.73 |
| Total | | 22 | 22 | 100.00 |

=== Maps ===
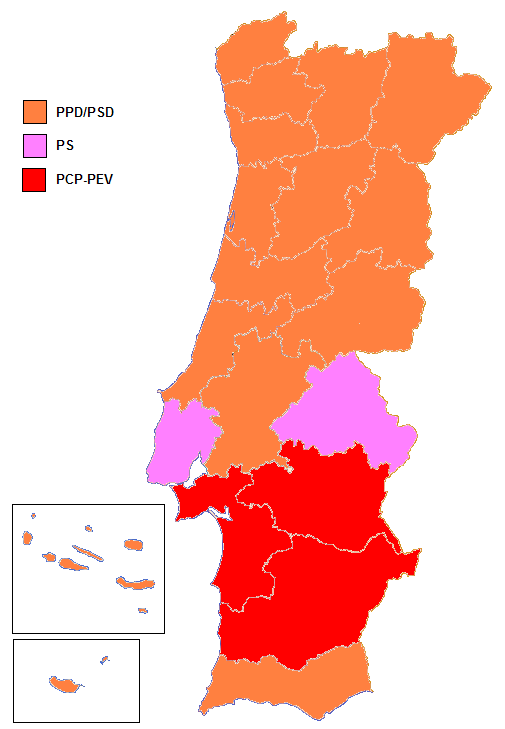
Most voted party by district and autonomous region.

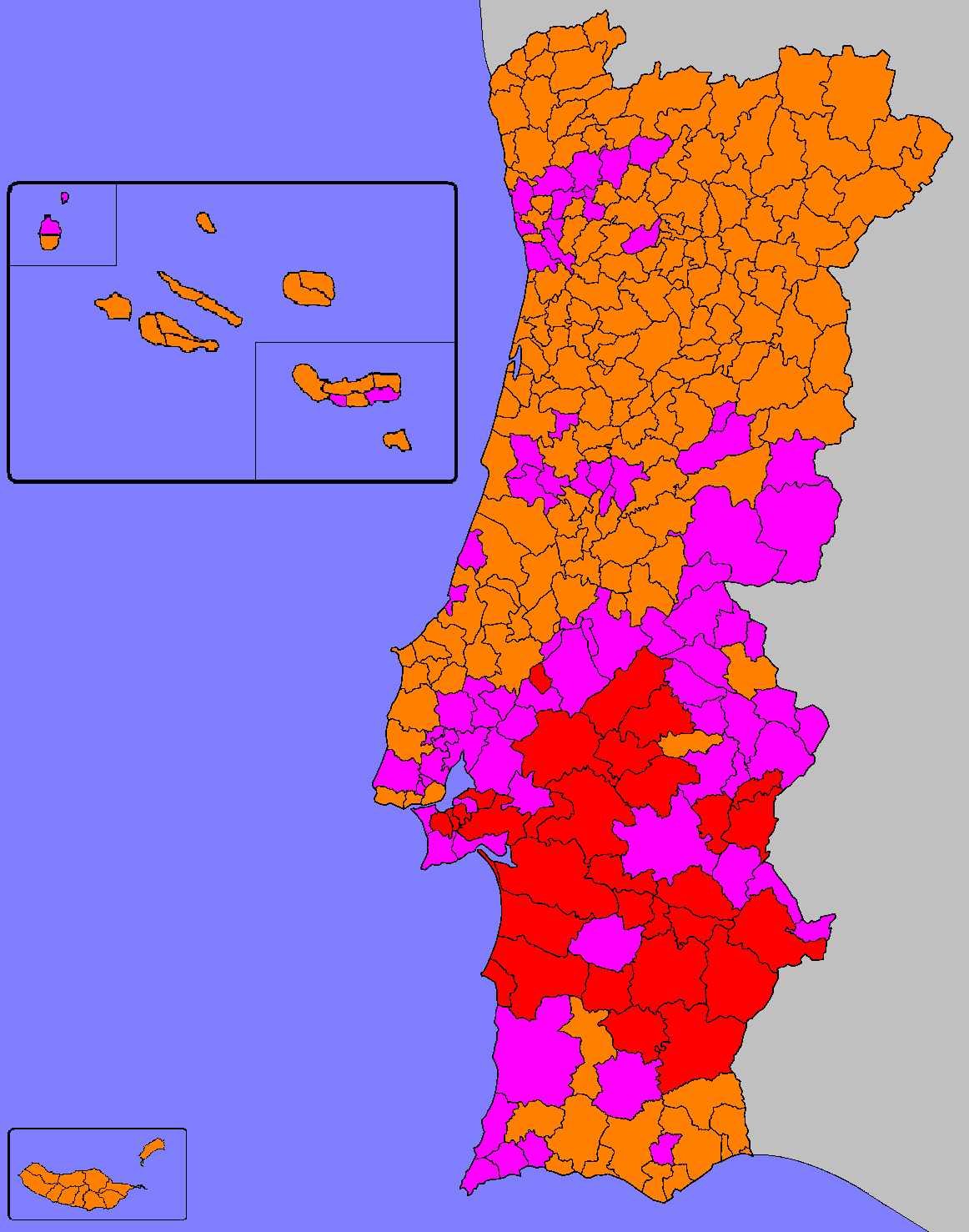
Strongest party by municipality.

== See also ==
- Politics of Portugal
- List of political parties in Portugal
- Elections in Portugal
- European Parliament
- 2009 European Parliament election
