= 2004 European Parliament election in Portugal =

- 13 June 2004

24 seats to the European Parliament
- Turnout: 38.6% ▼1.3 pp
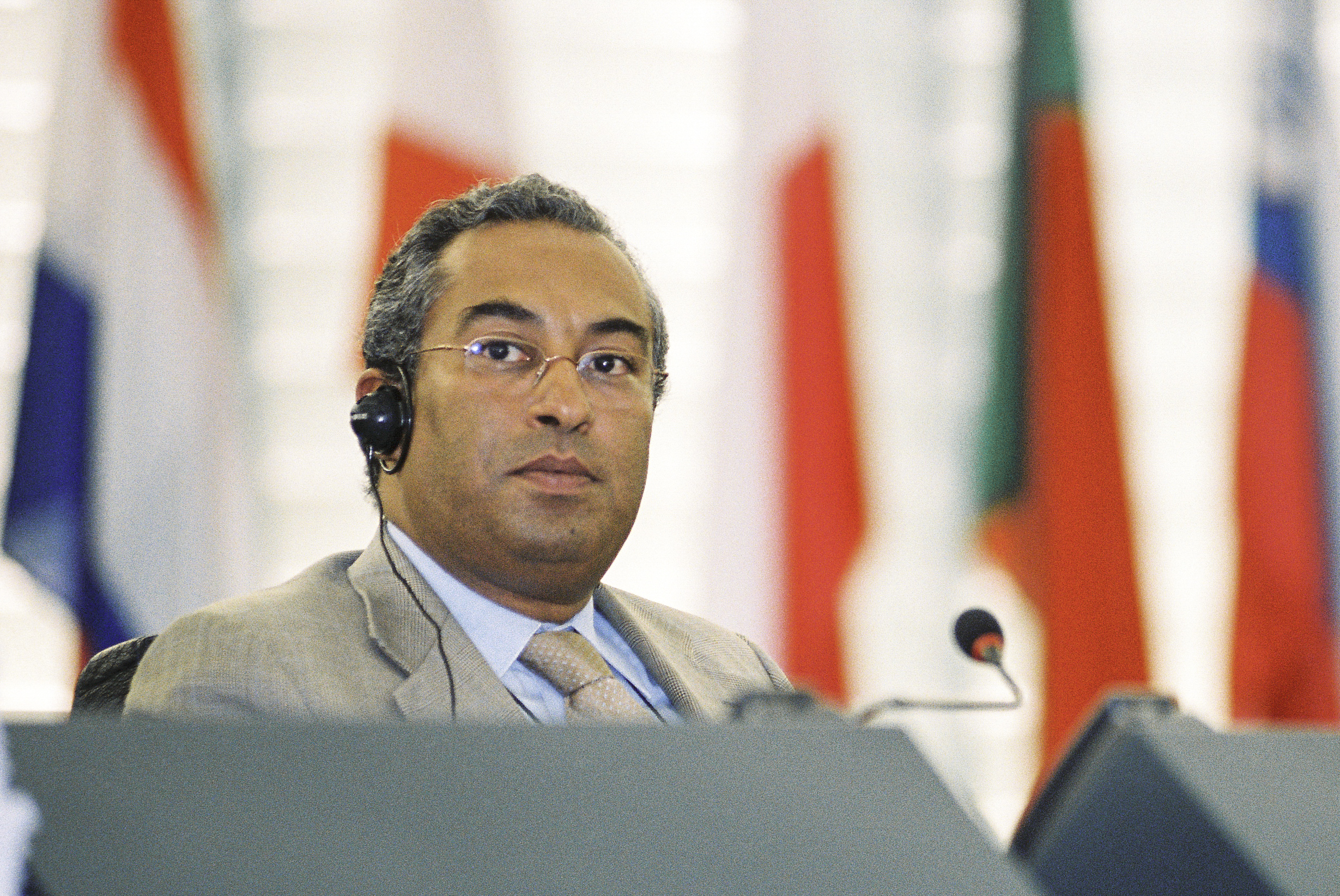

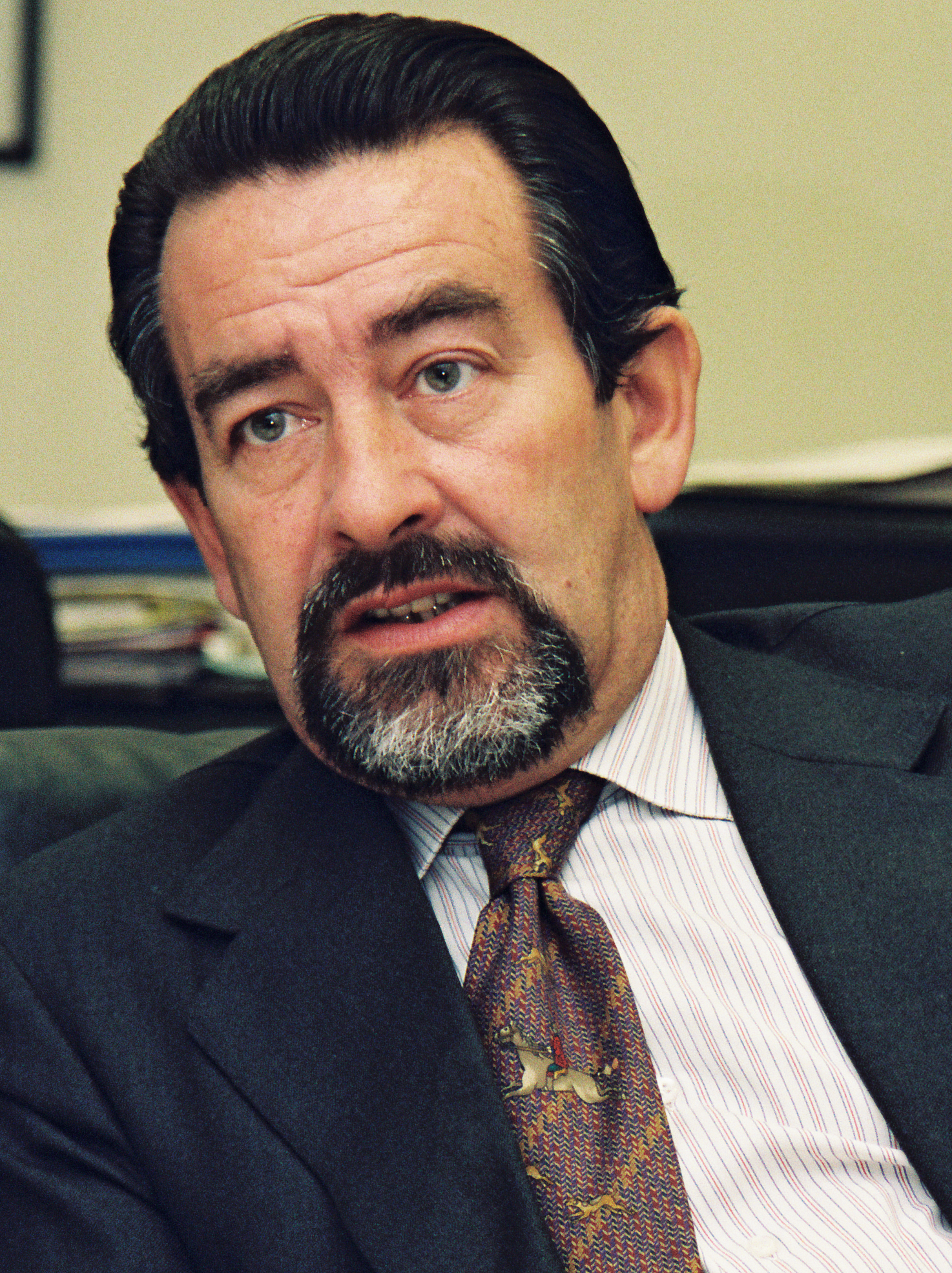

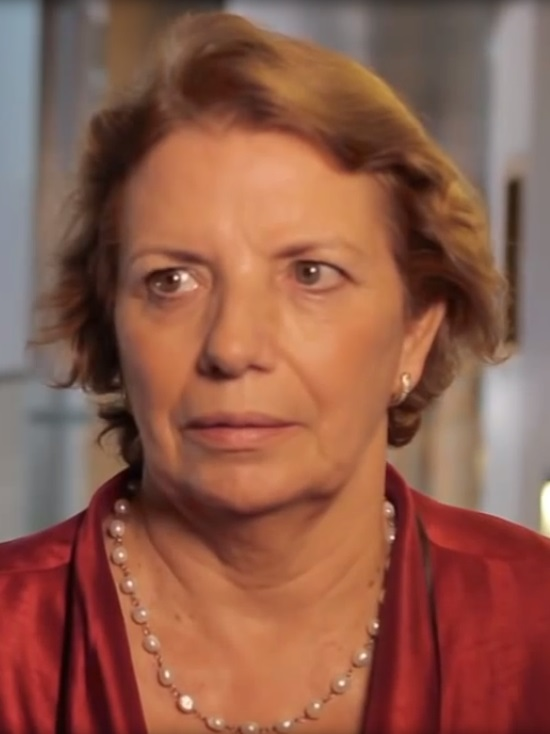

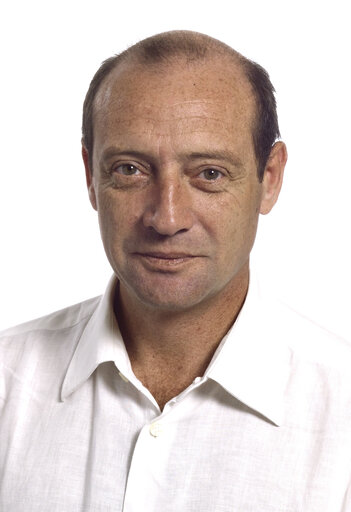
	First party	Second party
Leader	António Costa (replacing António Sousa Franco)	João de Deus Pinheiro
Party	PS	FP
Alliance	PES	EPP
Last election	12 seats, 43.1%	11 seats, 39.3%
Seats won	12	9
Seat change	0	▼2
Popular vote	1,516,001	1,132,769
Percentage	44.5%	33.3%
Swing	▲1.5 pp	▼6.0 pp
	Third party	Fourth party
Leader	Ilda Figueiredo	Miguel Portas
Party	CDU	BE
Alliance	GUE/NGL	EACL
Last election	2 seats, 10.3%	0 seats, 1.8%
Seats won	2	1
Seat change	0	▲1
Popular vote	309,401	167,313
Percentage	9.1%	4.9%
Swing	▼1.2 pp	▲3.1 pp

An election of MEPs representing Portugal for the 2004-2009 term of the European Parliament was held on 13 June 2004. It was part of the wider 2004 European election.

The Socialist Party (PS) was the big winner of the election, achieving their best result in a European election ever. The party won 44.5 percent of the votes, an increase of 1.5 percentage points, and held on to the 12 seats won in 1999. However the Socialist victory, and the campaign overall, was overshadowed by the sudden death of the PS top candidate, António Sousa Franco. Sousa Franco died of a heart attack while campaigning in Matosinhos, just four days before election day. António Costa, number 2 on the list, became the Socialists' top candidate after Sousa Franco's death.

The Social Democrats (PSD) and the People's Party (CDS–PP) contested the election in a coalition called "Forward Portugal" (FP). The coalition had a very weak performance, winning just 33 percent of the votes, a big drop compared with the combined total of 39 percent the PSD+CDS had in 1999. The PSD lost two seats, while CDS–PP held on to their two seats.

The Democratic Unity Coalition (CDU) dropped one point and fell below 10 percent of the votes for the first time. CDU was still able to hold on to the two seats they had won in 1999. The Left Bloc (BE) gained a seat for the EU parliament for the first time, and saw its share of vote increase to almost 5 percent, an increase of more than 3 percentage points compared with 1999.

Turnout dropped compared with 1999, with 38.6 percent of voters casting a ballot.

== Electoral system ==
The voting method used for the election of European members of parliament, is proportional representation using the d'Hondt method, which is known to benefit the largest parties slightly. In the 2004 EU elections, Portugal had 24 seats to be filled. Deputies are elected in a single constituency, corresponding to the entire national territory.

== Parties and candidates ==
The major parties that partook in the election, and their EP list leaders, were:

- Left Bloc (BE), Miguel Portas
- Democratic Unity Coalition (CDU), Ilda Figueiredo
- Social Democratic Party (PSD)/People's Party (CDS–PP) Forward Portugal (FP), João de Deus Pinheiro
- Earth Party (MPT), Luís Filipe Marques
- Movement for the Sick (MD), Vitorino Brandão
- Portuguese Workers' Communist Party (PCTP/MRPP), António Garcia Pereira
- New Democracy Party (PND), Manuel Monteiro
- Democratic Party of the Atlantic (PDA), José Soares
- National Renewal Party (PNR), Paulo Rodrigues
- Socialist Party (PS), António Costa
- People's Monarchist Party (PPM), Gonçalo da Câmara Pereira
- Workers' Party of Socialist Unity (POUS), Carmelinda Pereira

== Campaign period ==
=== Party slogans ===
Party or alliance	Original slogan	English translation	Refs
PS	« Queremos um Portugal melhor »	"We want a better Portugal"	
FP	« Força Portugal! »	"Forward Portugal!"	
CDU	« Outro caminho para a Europa e para Portugal »	"Another path for Europe and Portugal"	
BE	« Estás farto? »	"Had enough?"	

=== Candidates' debates ===
One last debate between the four main candidates was expected to be held on RTP on 10 June, but it was cancelled after the sudden death of the PS lead candidate António Sousa Franco on 9 June. Parties also cut short their campaigns.

2004 European Parliament election in Portugal debates
Date	Organisers	Moderator(s)	P Present A Absent invitee N Non-invitee				
Date	Organisers	Moderator(s)	PS S. Franco	FP Pinheiro	CDU Figueiredo	BE Portas	Refs
1 June	SIC Notícias	Clara de Sousa	P	P	P	P	
8 June	SIC Notícias	Clara de Sousa	P	P	N	N	

== Opinion polling ==
Exit poll

Polling firm/Link	Date Released	PS	FP		CDU	BE	O	Lead
Polling firm/Link	Date Released	PS	PSD	CDS–PP	CDU	BE	O	Lead
2004 EP election	13 June 2004	44.5; 12	33.3; 9		9.1; 2	4.9; 1	8.2; 0	11.2
UCP	13 June 2004	43–47; 12/13	32–36; 8/9		8–10; 2/3	4–6; 1	—	11
Eurosondagem	13 June 2004	44.1–47.9; 12/13	29.7–33.5; 8/9		10.1–11.9; 2/3	5.1–6.9; 1	—	14.4
Intercampus	13 June 2004	42.3–47.1; 12/13	30.5–35.1; 8/9		7.3–10.1; 2	4.7–6.9; 1	—	11.8; 12.0
Aximage	11 June 2004	40.3	39.8		8.3	6.2	5.5	0.5
UCP	11 June 2004	44	37		8	5	6	7
Eurosondagem	11 June 2004	43.3	37.8		7.7	5.6	5.6	5.5
Intercampus	11 June 2004	42.4	27.5		12.6	6.7	10.9	14.9
Marktest	9 June 2004	49.2	37.4		6.3	5.0	2.1	11.8
Aximage	5 June 2004	39.2; 11/12	34.5; 9/10		7.9; 2	2.4; 1	16.0; 0	4.7
Aximage	25 May 2004	39.5	33.6		8.3	4.0	14.6	5.9
TNS Euroteste	20 May 2004	34	34		4	3	25	Tie
Marktest (Note: Results presented here exclude undecideds (34.7%) and abstainers (14.0%). With their inclusion results are: PS: 26.2%; PSD/CDS-PP: 18.5%; CDU: 4.3%; BE: 2,2%; Blank: 2.0%.)	19 May 2004	49.2	34.8		8.1	4.1	3.8	14.4
UCP	14 May 2004	44.3	40.7		5.4	5.2	4.4	3.6
Aximage	7 May 2004	40.5; 11	35.8; 9		6.1; 1	3.3; 0	14.3; 0	4.7
Marktest	29 March 2004	54.7	34.5		5.5	2.4	3.0	20.2
Eurosondagem	19 March 2004	37.0; 11	37.6; 11		5.8; 1	4.3; 1	15.3; 0	0.6
Aximage	7 March 2004	39.2; 10	39.7; 11		7.0; 2	3.7; 1	10.4; 0	0.5
1999 EP election	13 June 1999	43.1; 12	31.1; 9	8.2; 2	10.3; 2	1.8; 0	5.6; 0	12.0

== Results ==
Party and European Parliament group		Votes	%	+/–	Seats	+/–
Socialist Party	PES	1,516,001	44.53	+1.45	12	0
Forward Portugal	EPP–ED	1,132,769	33.27	–6.00	9	–2
Unitary Democratic Coalition	GUE/NGL	309,401	9.09	–1.23	2	0
Left Bloc	GUE/NGL	167,313	4.91	+3.12	1	+1
Portuguese Workers' Communist Party	NI	36,294	1.07	+0.19	0	0
New Democracy Party	NI	33,833	0.99	New	0	New
People's Monarchist Party	NI	15,454	0.45	–0.02	0	0
Movement for the Sick	NI	13,840	0.41	New	0	New
Earth Party	ALDE	13,671	0.40	0.00	0	0
Humanist Party	NI	13,272	0.39	New	0	New
National Renewal Party	NI	8,405	0.25	New	0	New
Democratic Party of the Atlantic	NI	5,588	0.16	+0.01	0	0
Workers' Party of Socialist Unity	NI	4,275	0.13	–0.03	0	0
Total		3,270,116	100.00	–	24	–1
Valid votes		3,270,116	96.04	–0.70		
Invalid votes		47,224	1.39	–0.05		
Blank votes		87,442	2.57	+0.74		
Total votes		3,404,782	100.00	–		
Registered voters/turnout		8,821,456	38.60	–1.33		
Source: Comissão Nacional de Eleições

Vote share
PS	44.52%
FP	33.27%
CDU	9.09%
BE	4.91%
PCTP/MRPP	1.07%
PND	0.99%
Others	2.19%
Blank/Invalid	3.96%

Seats
PS	50.00%
FP	37.50%
CDU	8.33%
BE	4.17%

=== Distribution by European group ===
Summary of political group distribution in the 6th European Parliament (2004–2009)
Groups	Parties	Seats	Total	%
Party of European Socialists (PES)	Socialist Party (PS)	12	12	50.00
European People's Party–European Democrats (EPP–ED)	Social Democratic Party (PSD); People's Party (CDS–PP)	7; 2	9	37.50
European United Left–Nordic Green Left (GUE/NGL)	Portuguese Communist Party (PCP); Left Bloc (BE)	2; 1	3	12.50
Total		24	24	100.00

=== Maps ===
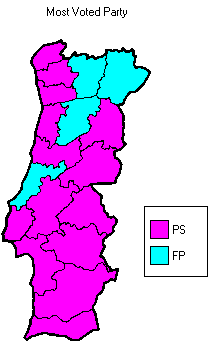
Most voted political force by district. (Azores and Madeira not shown)

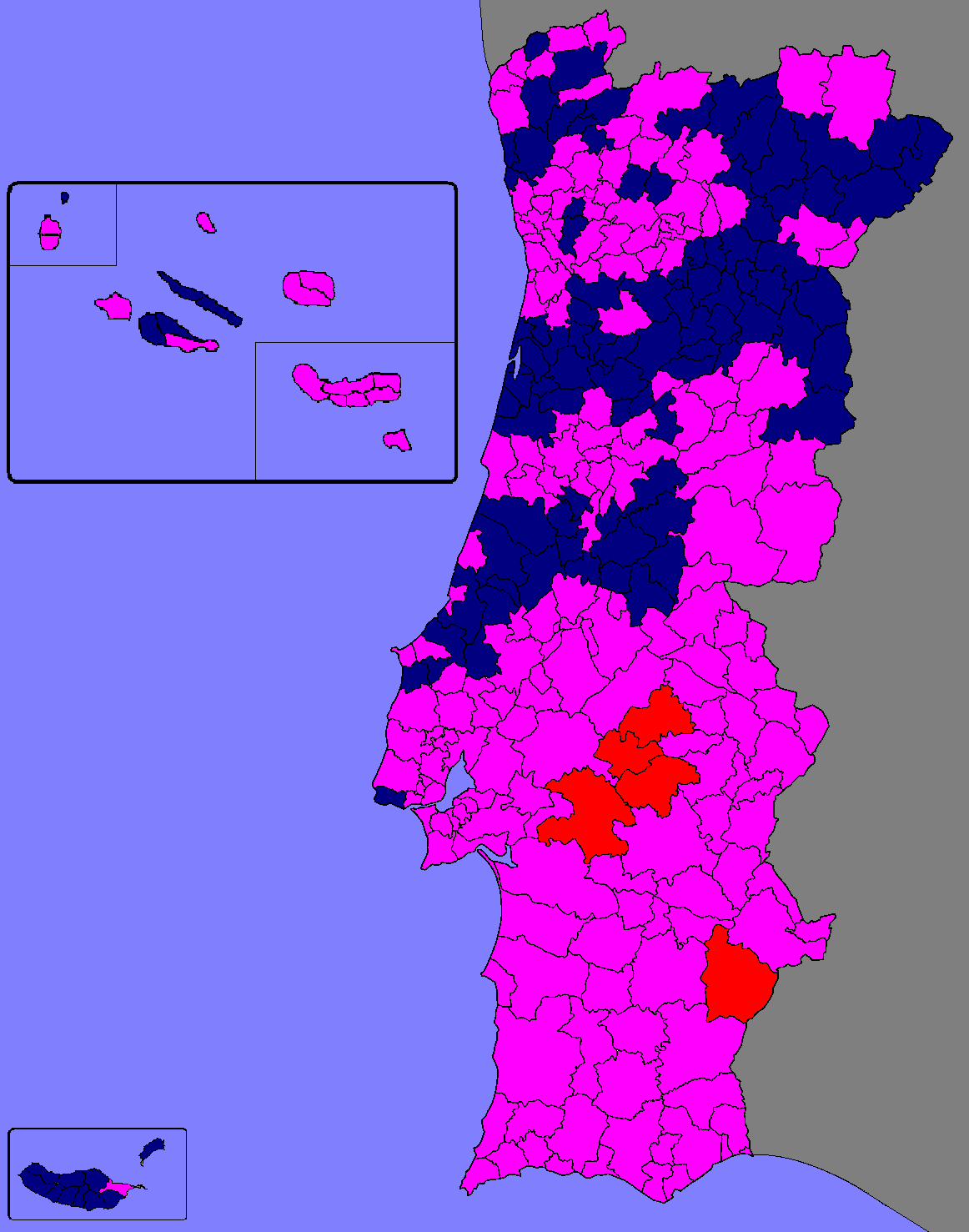
Strongest party by municipality. Pink: PS; Darkblue: PSD-CDS; Red: CDU

== See also ==
- Politics of Portugal
- List of political parties in Portugal
- Elections in Portugal
- European Parliament
