= Borda d'Água =

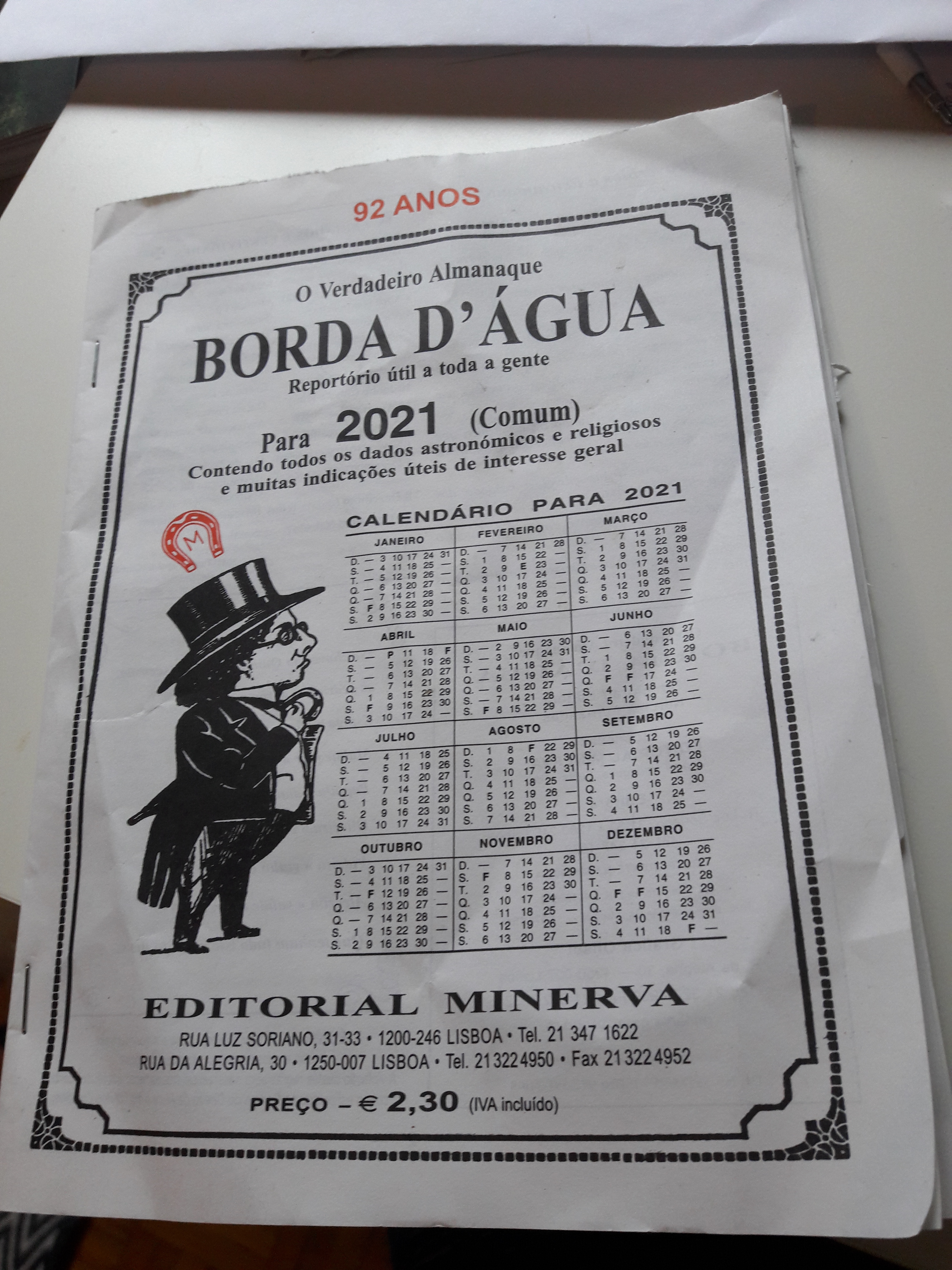
- 2021 edition
- Type: Annual
- Format: Almanac
- General manager: Narcisa Fernandes
- Founded: 1929
- Language: Portuguese
- Headquarters: Lisbon
- City: Lisbon
- Country: Portugal
- Circulation: 270,000 (2018)
- Price: 3.00€ (2026 edition)

Borda d'Água is a Portuguese almanac published annually since 1929 by Editorial Minerva. The publication continues to be printed in a traditional typography and has maintained the same editorial line since its founding. The almanac presents itself as a "useful resource for everyone." The almanac offers forecasts for the year, practical advice based on popular wisdom (proverbs, folk remedies, etc.), science, and astrology; weather forecasts, agricultural forecasts, sowing seasons and other agricultural work, moon phases, information about the sea and tides, a calendar, and ephemerides.

== Description ==
In 1986, Miguel Esteves Cardoso described Borda d'Água as: "With a print run of 50,000 copies, sold at the attractive price of 30$00, the 'Borda d'Água' Almanac is a Portuguese institution that legitimately describes itself as a 'useful resource for everyone'. It consists of 16 pages full of information without which it is unimaginable to survive."
