= Movement for the Sick =

Portuguese political party

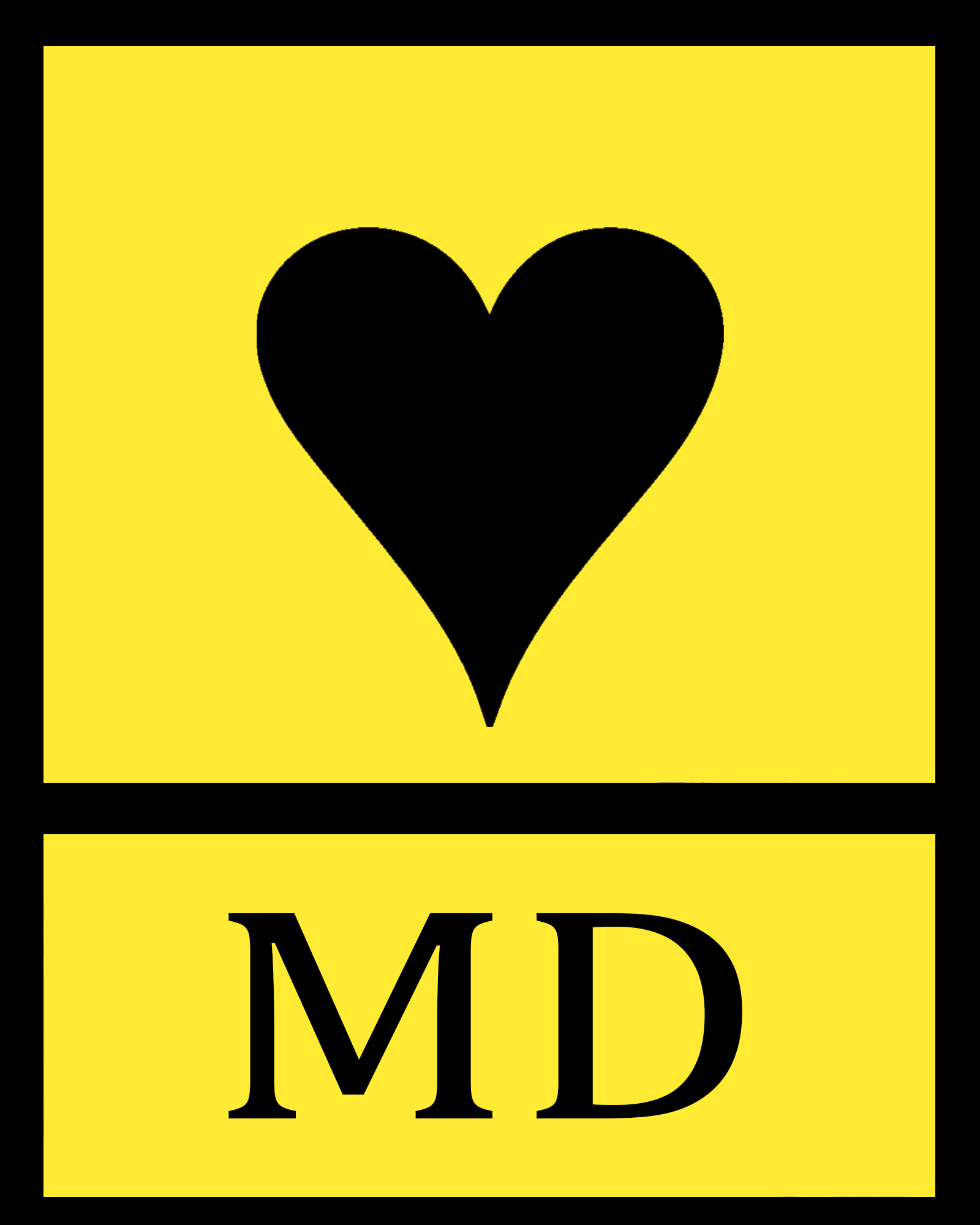
Logo of Movement for the Sick

The Movement for the Sick (Portuguese: Movimento pelo Doente, pronounced [muviˈmẽtu ˈpelu ðuˈẽtɨ]) was a political party of Portugal, from 2002 to 2007.

The movement claimed its main goals were to promote the defense of social rights, namely health rights and to promote ethical humanism in Portuguese culture.

They ran for the 2004 European Parliament election, getting 0.4% of the votes (about 14 thousand votes).

On January 17th, 2007, the Constitutional Court accepted its dissolution and conversion into a non-profit association.
