= O Independente =

Portuguese weekly newspaper

- Type: Weekly newspaper
- Founder(s): Miguel Esteves Cardoso; Paulo Portas
- Publisher: Recoletos
- Founded: May 1988
- Political alignment: Rightwing, conservative
- Language: Portuguese
- Ceased publication: 1 September 2006
- Headquarters: Lisbon

O Independente (Portuguese for The Independent) was a Portuguese weekly newspaper published in Lisbon, Portugal, between 1988 and 2006.

== History and profile ==
O Independente was first published in May 1988 by Miguel Esteves Cardoso, who became its first editor, and Paulo Portas, who succeeded him in 1990 and served until 1995 when he left to run for office as a conservative politician.

O Independente was published by Recoletos weekly on Fridays. Its headquarters was in Lisbon. The paper had a rightwing, conservative stance and a Eurosceptic discourse.

The last edition of O Independente was published on 1 September 2006.
