= Último Volume =

1991 Portuguese book by Miguel Esteves Cardoso

Último Volume (Portuguese for Last Volume) is a book by Miguel Esteves Cardoso, published in 1991.

The book comprises 41 chronicles, which are independent from each other, and deal with many aspects of quotidian life and politics. Some of them are widely quoted around the Internet, like Uma Família Feliz (A Happy Family), which proposes a model of family in which its members live in separate houses, or Em Nome do Amor Puro (In the Name of Pure Love).
