= Catarina Portas =

Portuguese journalist and businesswoman (born 1969)

Catarina Lobo Portas
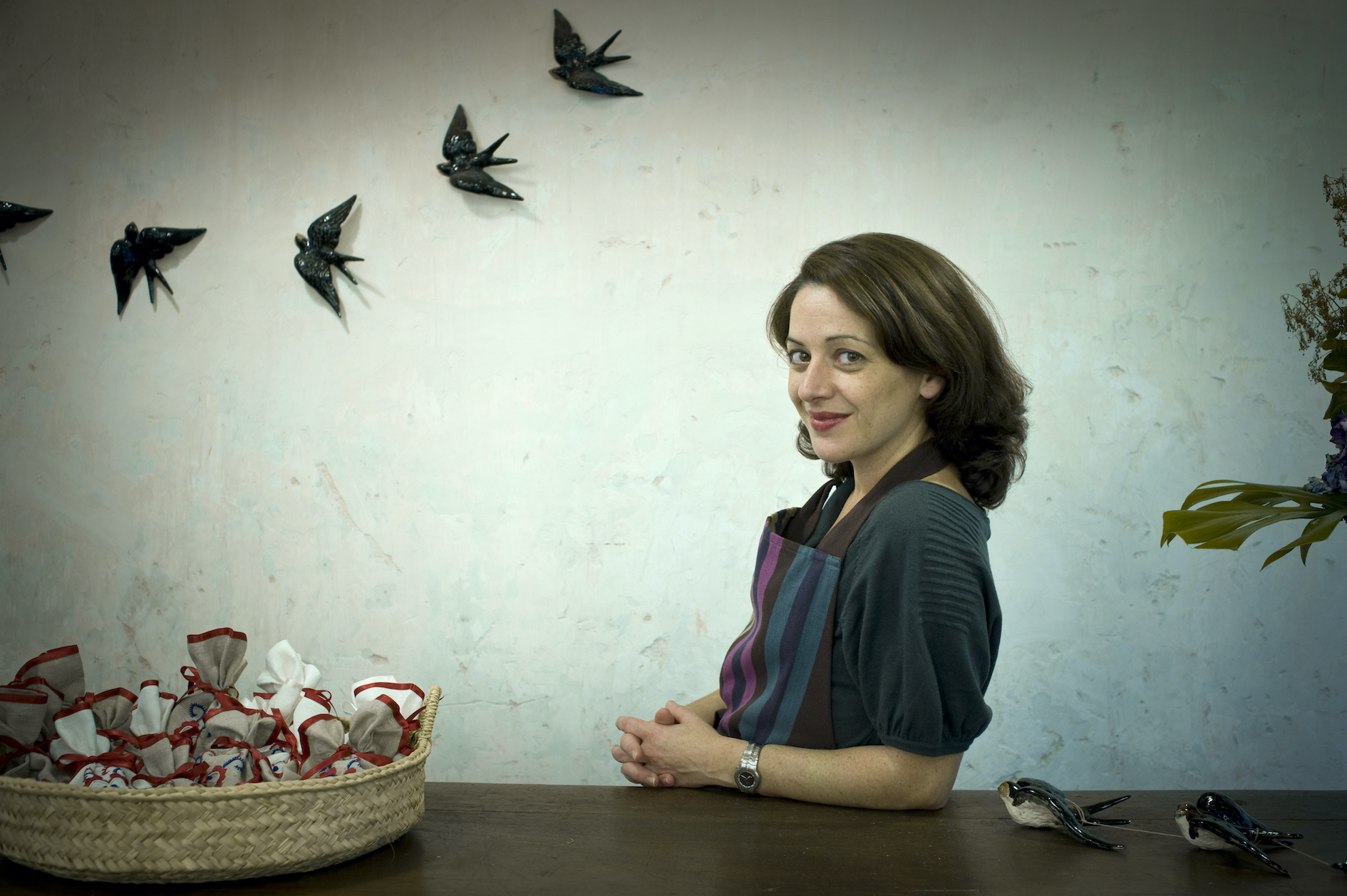
- Born: 1969 (age 56–57); Lisbon
- Occupations: Journalist and businesswoman
- Parents: Nuno Portas; Margarida Lobo

Catarina de Sousa Lobo Martins Portas (born 1969) is a Portuguese journalist and businesswoman.

== Biography ==
She is the daughter of the architect Nuno Portas and of his second wife, Margarida Maria Gomes de Sousa Lobo and half sister of the politicians Miguel Portas and Paulo Portas. Catarina became a journalist in 1988 and worked on the radio (Correio da Manhã Rádio and Rádio Comercial) and on television, firstly in RTP (Onda Curta, Falatório, Raios e Coriscos and Frou Frou), and then in SIC. Since 2004, she became a businesswoman, with the inauguration of the A Vida Portuguesa stores, dedicated to the reselling of vintage Portuguese brands. In December 2009, she was nominated by Monocle magazine as one of the twenty worldwide names that deserve "a bigger stage".
