= 1999 European Parliament election in Portugal =

- 13 June 1999

25 seats to the European Parliament
- Turnout: 39.9% ▲4.4 pp
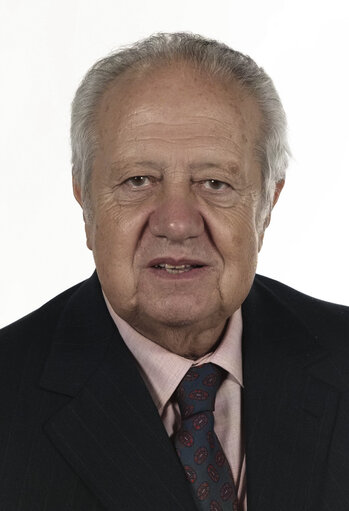

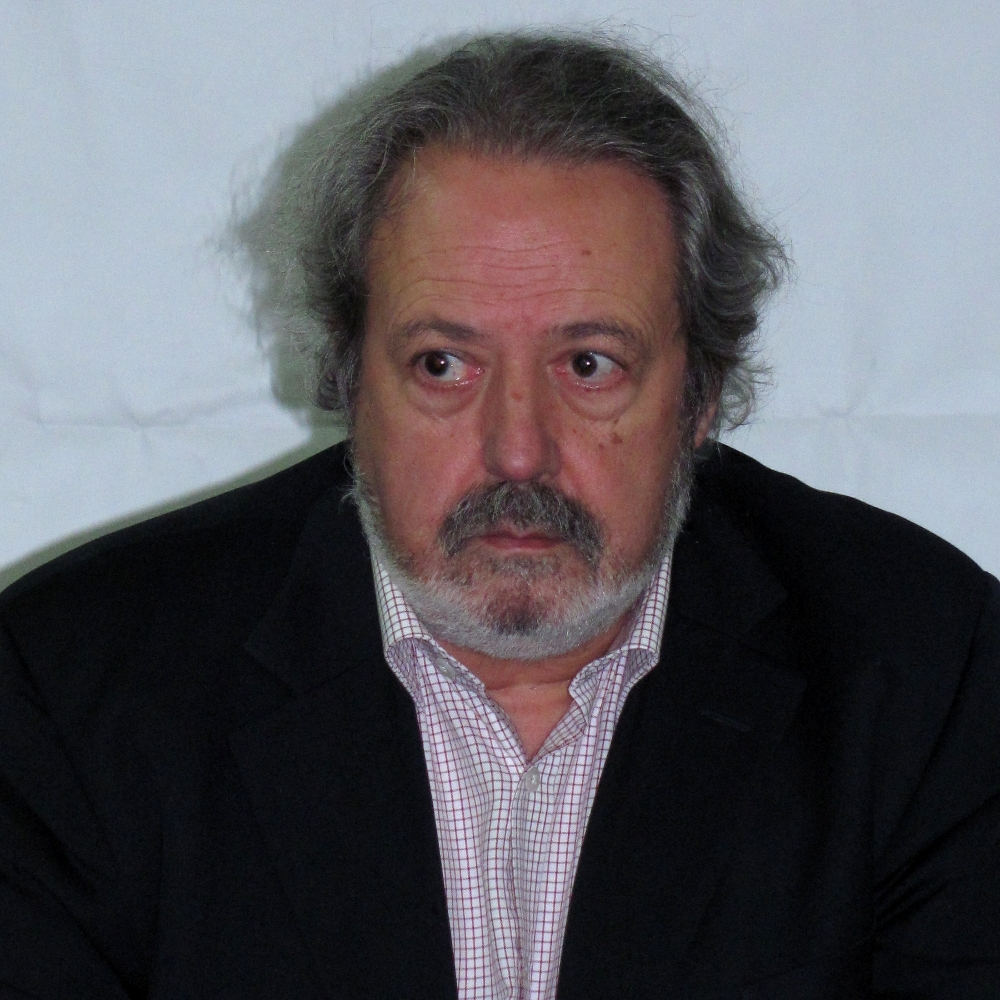

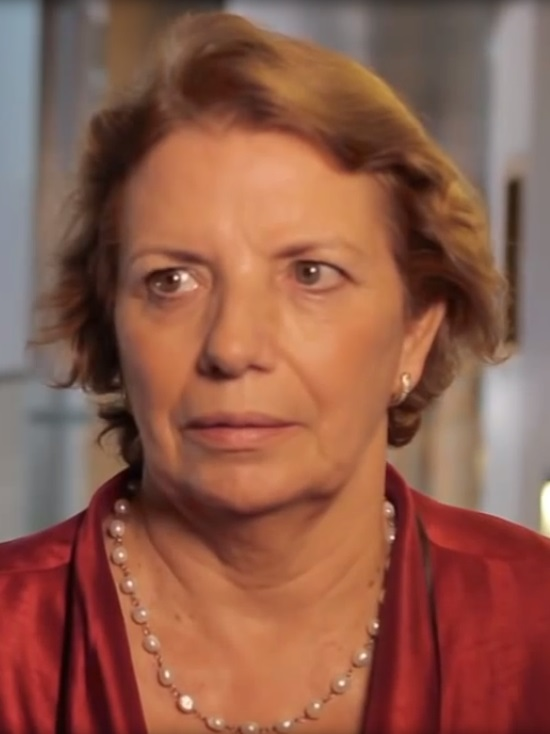

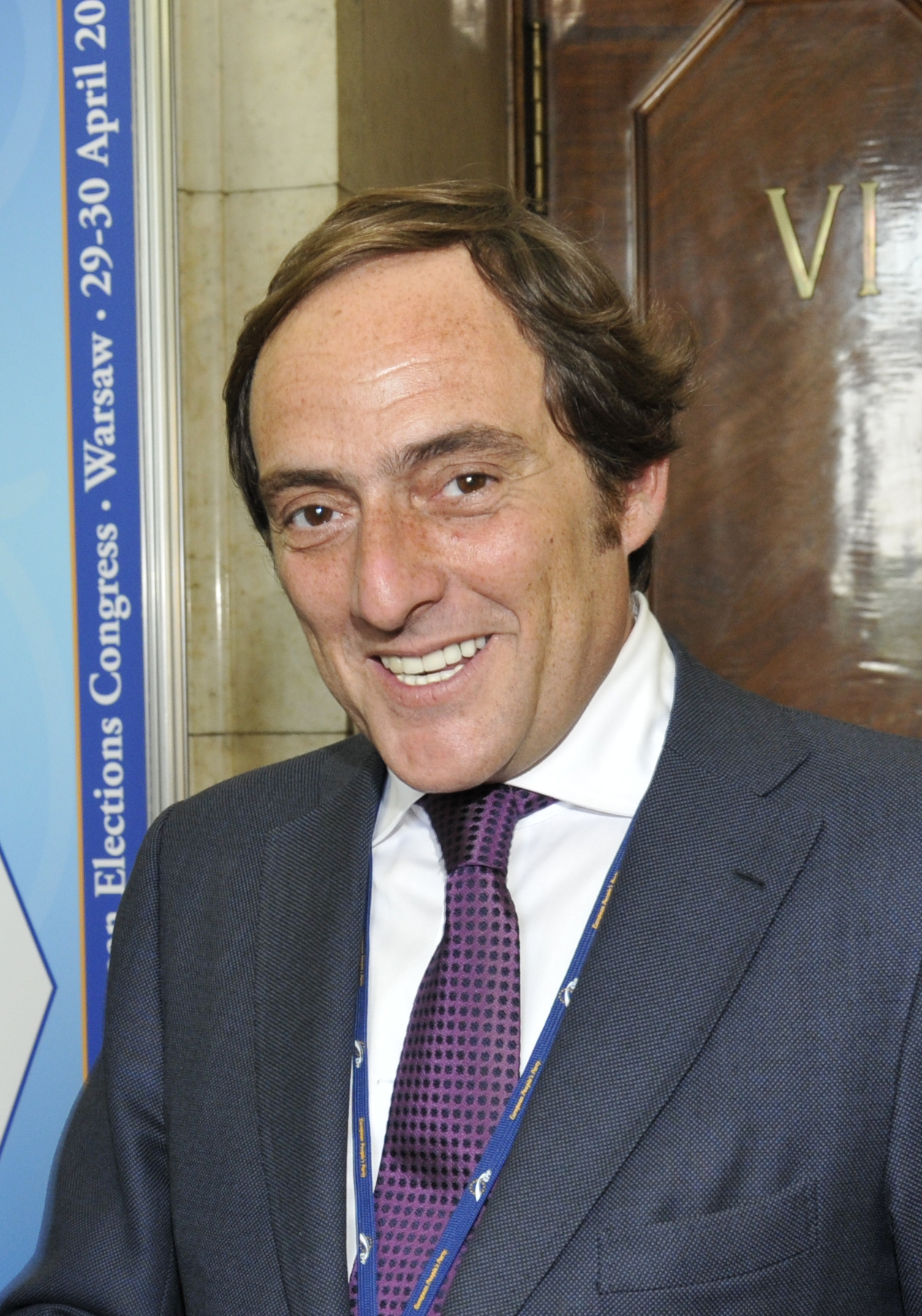
	First party	Second party
Leader	Mário Soares	Pacheco Pereira
Party	PS	PSD
Alliance	PES	EPP
Last election	10 seats, 34.9%	9 seats, 34.4%
Seats won	12	9
Seat change	▲2	0
Popular vote	1,493,146	1,078,528
Percentage	43.1%	31.1%
Swing	▲8.2 pp	▼3.3 pp
	Third party	Fourth party
Leader	Ilda Figueiredo	Paulo Portas
Party	CDU	CDS–PP
Alliance	GUE/NGL	UFE
Last election	3 seats, 11.2%	3 seats, 12.5%
Seats won	2	2
Seat change	▼1	▼1
Popular vote	357,671	283,067
Percentage	10.3%	8.2%
Swing	▼0.9 pp	▼4.3 pp

An election of MEP representing Portugal constituency for the 1999–2004 term of the European Parliament was held on 13 June. It was part of the wider 1999 European election.

In the runner up for the 1999 general elections, the Socialist Party (PS) won the EU election by a landslide. The party, headed by its founder and former President of the Republic and Prime Minister Mário Soares, scored a convincing victory over the Social Democrats. The PS increased its share of vote by more than 8 percentange points, and won 2 more seats compared with 1994. The Social Democratic Party (PSD) had a bad performance, but were still able to hold on to its 9 seats, but at the same time, the party saw their share of vote drop to 31 percent, around 3 points lower than in 1994.

The Democratic Unity Coalition (CDU) performed quite well, although it dropped compared with 1994. The Communist/Green alliance won more than 10 percent of the votes, a drop of around 1 point, and lost one seat, but was able to reclaim the title of 3rd largest party. The People's Party (CDS–PP), was the party that suffered the most. The People's Party dropped to fourth place and had the biggest fall in terms of share of the vote, winning just 8 percent of the vote, a fall of more than 4 points. They also lost one seat compared to 1994.

Turnout increased compared with 1994, with 39.9 percent of voters casting a ballot.

== Electoral system ==
The voting method used, for the election of European members of parliament, is by proportional representation using the d'Hondt method, which is known to benefit leading parties. In the 1999 EU elections, Portugal had 25 seats to be filled. Deputies are elected in a single constituency, corresponding to the entire national territory.

== Parties and candidates ==
The major parties that partook in the election, and their EP list leaders, were:

- Left Bloc (BE), Miguel Portas
- Democratic Unity Coalition (CDU), Ilda Figueiredo
- People's Party (CDS–PP), Paulo Portas
- Earth Party (MPT), Paulo Trancoso
- Portuguese Workers' Communist Party (PCTP/MRPP), António Garcia Pereira
- Socialist Party (PS), Mário Soares
- Social Democratic Party (PSD), José Pacheco Pereira
- Workers' Party of Socialist Unity (POUS), Carmelinda Pereira

== Opinion polling ==
The following table shows the opinion polls of voting intention of the Portuguese voters before the election. Those parties that are listed were represented in the EU parliament (1994–1999). Included is also the result of the Portuguese EP elections in 1994 and 1999 for reference.

Note, until 2000, the publication of opinion polls in the last week of the campaign was forbidden.

Polling firm/Link	Date Released	PS	PSD	CDS–PP	CDU	O	Lead
1999 EP election	13 Jun 1994	43.1; 12	31.1; 9	8.2; 2	10.3; 2	7.3; 0	12.0
Público	6 Jun 1999	48.3	31.4	—N/a	—N/a	20.3	16.9
Euroexpansão	4 Jun 1999	54.6	30.8	—N/a	—N/a	14.6	23.8
Diário de Notícias	2 Jun 1999	52.2	35.9	—N/a	—N/a	11.9	16.3
Semanário	2 Jun 1999	49.7	33.6	—N/a	—N/a	16.7	16.1
Visão	2 Jun 1999	44	33	—N/a	—N/a	23	11.0
Visão	20 May 1999	45	40	—N/a	—N/a	15	5
1994 EP election	12 Jun 1994	34.9; 10	34.4; 9	12.5; 3	11.2; 3	7.1; 0	0.5

== Results ==
Party and European Parliament group		Votes	%	+/–	Seats	+/–
Socialist Party	PES	1,493,146	43.07	+8.20	12	+2
Social Democratic Party	EPP–ED	1,078,528	31.11	–3.28	9	0
Unitary Democratic Coalition	GUE/NGL	357,671	10.32	–0.87	2	–1
CDS – People's Party	UFE	283,067	8.16	–4.29	2	–1
Left Bloc	NI	61,920	1.79	New	0	New
Portuguese Workers' Communist Party	NI	30,446	0.88	+0.09	0	0
People's Monarchist Party	NI	16,182	0.47	+0.20	0	0
Earth Party	ELDR	13,924	0.40	–0.03	0	0
National Solidarity Party	NI	8,413	0.24	–0.13	0	0
Workers' Party of Socialist Unity	NI	5,565	0.16	+0.06	0	0
Democratic Party of the Atlantic	NI	5,089	0.15	–0.08	0	0
Total		3,353,951	100.00	–	25	0
Valid votes		3,353,951	96.74	–0.16		
Invalid votes		49,853	1.44	–0.05		
Blank votes		63,281	1.83	+0.22		
Total votes		3,467,085	100.00	–		
Registered voters/turnout		8,681,854	39.93	+4.39		
Source: Comissão Nacional de Eleições

Vote share
PS	43.07%
PSD	31.11%
CDU	10.32%
CDS-PP	8.16%
BE	1.79%
PCTP/MRPP	0.88%
Others	1.43%
Blank/Invalid	3.27%

Seats
PS	48.00%
PSD	36.00%
CDU	8.00%
CDS-PP	8.00%

=== Distribution by European group ===
Summary of political group distribution in the 5th European Parliament (1999–2004)
Groups	Parties	Seats	Total	%
Party of European Socialists (PES)	Socialist Party (PS)	12	12	48.00
European People's Party–European Democrats (EPP–ED)	Social Democratic Party (PSD)	9	9	36.00
European United Left–Nordic Green Left (GUE/NGL)	Portuguese Communist Party (PCP)	2	2	8.00
Union for Europe (UFE)	People's Party (CDS–PP)	2	2	8.00
Total		25	25	100.00

=== Maps ===
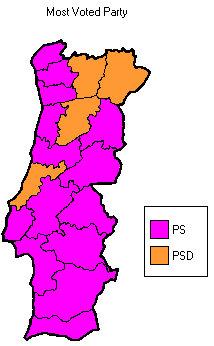
Most voted political force by district. (Azores and Madeira not shown)

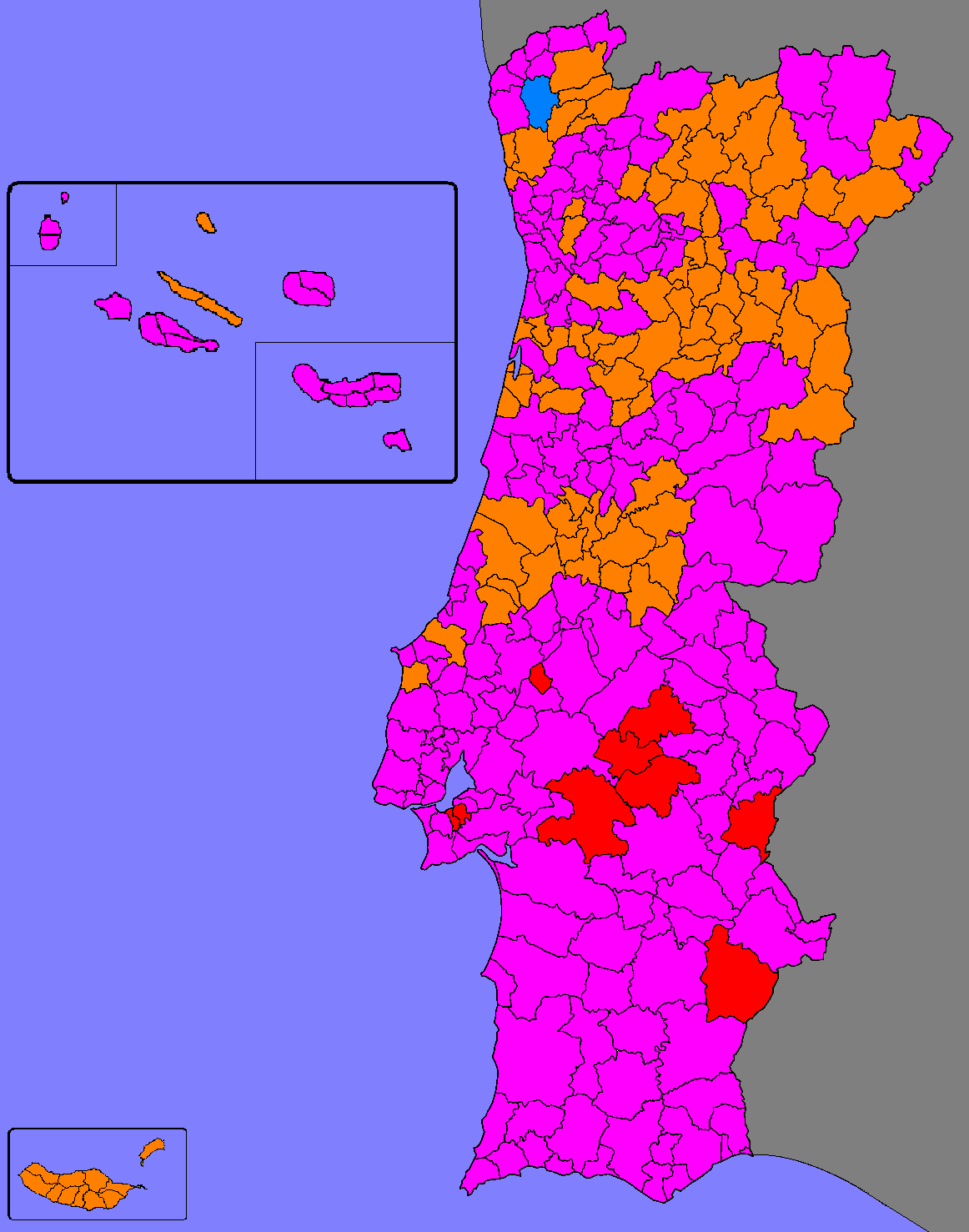
Strongest party by municipality.

== See also ==
- Politics of Portugal
- List of political parties in Portugal
- Elections in Portugal
- European Parliament
