= Força Portugal =

Former Portuguese political alliance

Força Portugal (Portuguese for Forward Portugal) was a Portuguese right of center political alliance consisting of the Social Democratic Party and the People's Party. The parties contested together in the 2004 European Elections. The alliance won 33% of the votes and 9 seats. Seven of these seats went to the Social Democrats and two to the People's Party. Compared to the 1999 European Elections where the two parties contested separately, they lost two seats.

== Election results ==
=== European Parliament ===
European Parliament
Date	Votes			Seats		Size	Notes
Date	#	%	± pp	#	±	Size	Notes
2004	1,132,769	33.3%		9 / 24		2nd	
