= Paulo Portas =

Portuguese media and political figure

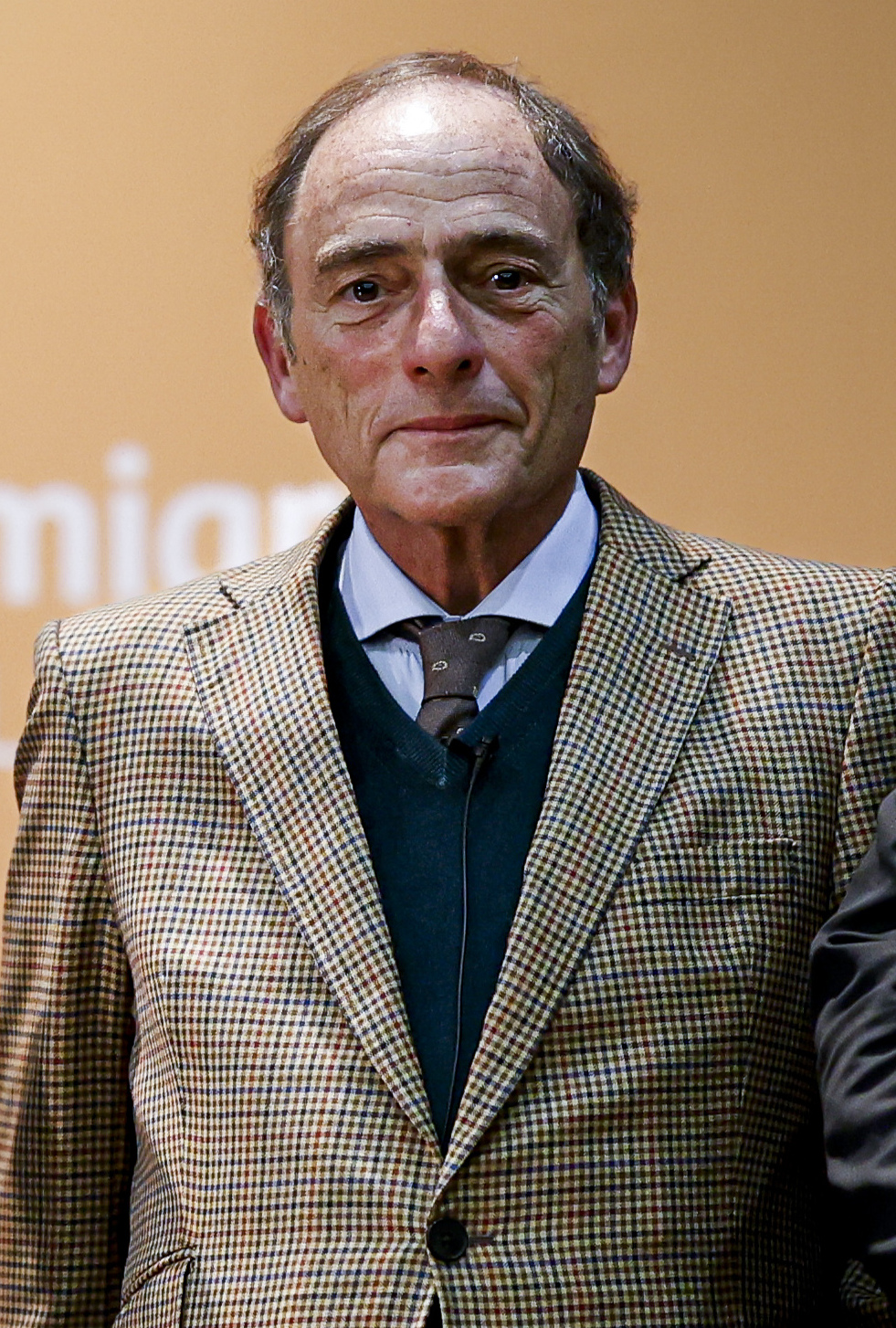
- Portas in 2025

Deputy Prime Minister of Portugal
- In office 24 July 2013 – 26 November 2015
- Prime Minister: Pedro Passos Coelho
- Preceded by: Eurico de Melo
- Succeeded by: Position vacant

Minister of Foreign Affairs
- In office 21 June 2011 – 24 July 2013
- Prime Minister: Pedro Passos Coelho
- Preceded by: Luís Amado
- Succeeded by: Rui Machete

President of the CDS – People's Party
- In office 21 April 2007 – 13 March 2016
- Preceded by: José Ribeiro e Castro
- Succeeded by: Assunção Cristas
- In office 22 March 1998 – 24 April 2005
- Preceded by: Manuel Monteiro
- Succeeded by: José Ribeiro e Castro

Minister of National Defence
- In office 6 April 2002 – 12 March 2005
- Prime Minister: José Manuel Barroso; Pedro Santana Lopes
- Preceded by: Rui Pena
- Succeeded by: Luís Amado

Member of the Assembly of the Republic
- In office 1 October 1995 – 2 June 2016
- Constituency: Aveiro (1995–2015); Lisbon (2015–2016)

Personal details
- Born: Paulo de Sacadura Cabral Portas; 12 September 1962 (age 64) Lisbon, Portugal
- Party: People's Party (1995–present)
- Other political affiliations: Social Democratic Party (1975–1982)
- Relatives: Nuno Portas (father); Miguel Portas (brother); Catarina Portas (half-sister); Sacadura Cabral (maternal great-uncle); Maria Velho da Costa (godmother)
- Education: Catholic University of Portugal

Paulo de Sacadura Cabral Portas (born 12 September 1962, Portuguese pronunciation: [ˈpawlu ˈpɔɾtɐʃ]) is a Portuguese media and political figure, who has, since the 1990s, been one of Portugal's leading conservative politicians. He was the leader of one of Portugal's right-wing parties, the CDS – People's Party (CDS-PP) from 1998 to 2005 and 2007–2016, on whose lists he was elected to the Portuguese Parliament in every legislative election between 1995 and 2015. He was Deputy Prime Minister of Portugal from 2013 to 2015, Minister of State and Foreign Affairs from 2011 to 2013, and Minister of Defence from 2002 to 2005, all three times in coalitions of the PSD and his CDS-PP. Portas withdrew from politics in 2016.

== Early life ==
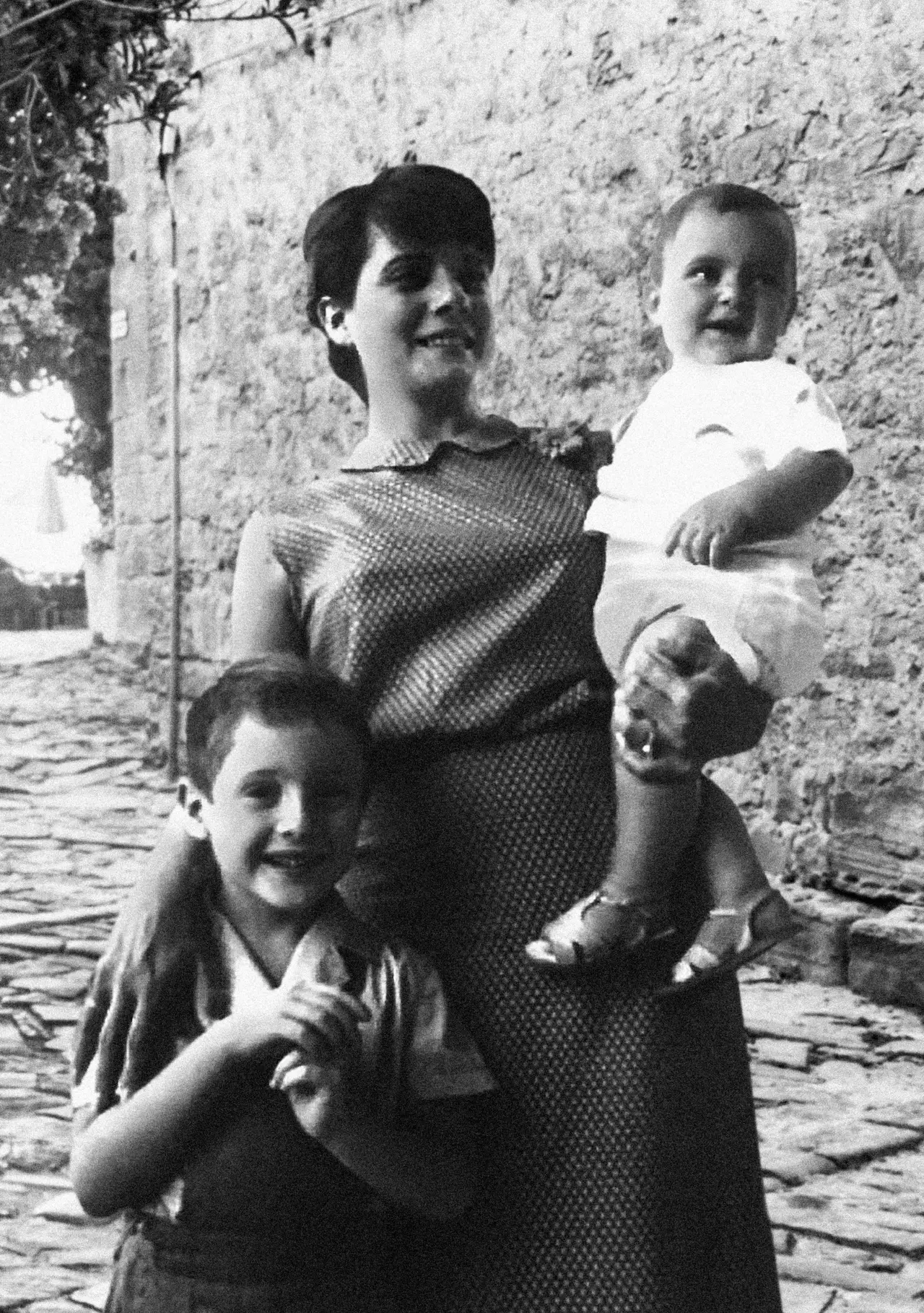
Helena Sacadura Cabral and her two sons, Miguel and Paulo Portas

Paulo Portas was born in Lisbon and grew up in Vila Viçosa. His father, Nuno Portas, was an influential post-modernist architect, who professed progressive Roman Catholic views. His mother, Helena Sacadura Cabral (niece of aviation pioneer Artur Sacadura Cabral) is an economist, journalist and author, who held more conservative views that appear to have passed on to Paulo Portas, who stayed living with her after his parents separated. In contrast, his older brother Miguel Portas stayed with their father and became a communist and later a leftist. Their half-sister is Catarina Portas, a well-known Portuguese journalist, businesswoman and media personality.

Following the 1974 Carnation Revolution in Portugal, Paulo Portas was briefly sent to school in France but returned in 1975 to study at Lisbon's top private high school (Colégio de São João de Brito). In 1984 he got a law degree from the Portuguese Catholic University, where he met Manuel Monteiro who, 10 years later, would serve as Portas's stepping stone into the CDS-PP and national politics. He is said to be a Church-going Catholic.

== Press career ==
At age 12 in junior high school, Paulo Portas is said to have launched a school newspaper called "Laughs and Smiles" (Risos e Sorrisos); it is not known how long it lasted. In his mid-teens (1974–75) he began contributing to the official newspaper of the youth wing of the PSD (which at the time was called Partido Popular Democrático, 'PPD'). The paper was called "On Behalf of Socialism" (Pelo Socialismo) and Portas became its chief editor. As a teen he also began working on the conservative daily A Tarde and weekly O Tempo newspapers and soon his eloquent anti-leftist views earned him guest opinion columns in the few conservative newspapers of post-revolution Lisbon. He first became nationally known at 15 years of age when he wrote a letter-to-the-editor of the daily evening newspaper Jornal Novo that prominently published it under the heading "Three Betrayals" ("Três Traições") directly accusing then president Ramalho Eanes, prime minister Mário Soares and foreign minister Diogo Freitas do Amaral of "selling out" Portugal's African colonies in 1974–75. The article earned him a libel lawsuit from President Eanes and valuable public exposure to get his own weekly opinion column in O Tempo and, some years later, in the new weekly Semanário. In 1987, he co-founded, with Miguel Esteves Cardoso, the weekly newspaper O Independente, which started publication in May 1988 and became known for its innovative editorial concepts as well as for denouncing political scandals, often on the basis of little more than hearsay. In reporting such scandals, Portas personally targeted the then prime-minister Aníbal Cavaco Silva and most of his ministers (1985–1995) thus making several enemies in the PSD. Although it reached very respectable circulation levels in the 1990s, O Independente never quite reached Portas's stated objective of outselling the leading Portuguese weekly Expresso and eventually folded in 2006.

In the 1990s Portas became a TV personality appearing regularly on several Portuguese TV channels as a political commentator. He was a sporadic panel member in a popular weekly night TV talk show (Raios e Coriscos) and in the Portuguese edition of Crossfire. In 2006, after his first stint as a government minister, he returned to TV with his own biweekly show (O Estado da Arte) where he commented on current issues.

== Political career ==
=== The formative years, 1974–85 ===
Paulo Portas showed a precocious interest in politics and as a child engaged in lively political discussions with his elders. In 1975 he joined the youth wing of the Democratic Popular Party (PPD), which in 1976 became PSD Social Democratic Party. He would later profess to have been a staunch follower of PPD's founder Francisco Sá Carneiro, who is said to have relished the views of the 14-year-old Paulo Portas and personally sponsored his full PSD membership in 1978. Sá Carneiro died in 1980 and, following a bitter loss in an internal election of the party's youth-wing JSD, Portas quietly left PSD in 1982. He remained involved with politics through his popular opinion-columns in the conservative weekly newspapers O Tempo and Semanário.

=== Early political career, 1986–97 ===
Paulo Portas took his first big step into politics in 1986 with his personal endorsement of presidential candidate Diogo Freitas do Amaral, in support of whom Portas, already a well-known media pundit, campaigned with determination. However, Freitas do Amaral lost the election and Portas stepped back from politics to launch the "O Independente" newspaper project and became its Deputy-Director. By the 1990s he was a widely recognized national figure and stated more than once on TV that he "did not want to be a politician" but it would later become apparent that he was, on the contrary, moving full speed towards becoming Portugal's leading conservative politician. He is credited with helping his former University colleague Manuel Monteiro gain the leadership of the Centro Democrático Social (CDS) party in 1992 and with coming up with new strategies, such as rebranding the CDS as the People's Party (CDS-PP) in line with several of the major conservative European parties. In 1995, Portas formally joined the CDS-PP with the full support of Manuel Monteiro, who put him at the top of the party list in the district of Aveiro thus ensuring that he would become a member of the Portuguese Parliament in that year's legislative elections. In 1997 he ran and was elected member of the municipal chamber of Oliveira de Azeméis.

=== Affirmation as party leader, 1998–2001 ===
In 1998, after the CDS-PP performed poorly in the 1997 local elections, Portas made his move to control the party by first manoeuvering to get Manuel Monteiro to resign, and then by defeating his hand-picked successor who underestimated Portas by comparing him to Mickey Mouse. On 22 March 1998, Portas finally became President of the CDS-PP after a bitter take-over that established Portas's reputation as a cunning politician who does not hesitate to remove those who stand in his way even if they had formerly been his friends or allies. Upon taking over the CDS-PP, he immediately sought to energize the party and earn himself name recognition by campaigning in more media-friendly ways and soon became known by his appearances in public events that earned him the nickname "Paulie of the Market Fairs" (in Portuguese: "Paulinho das Feiras"). He is also said to have brought in political marketing experts to enhance his image and that of the party. He was a leading voice against Portugal's "regionalization" and "legalization of abortion" in two 1998 referendums that did not come to pass. In 1999, he headed the CDS-PP list to the European Parliament, got elected but only remained in Brussels less than six months. In 2001 he ran for Mayor of Lisbon and was soundly defeated, but got enough votes to be elected member of the City Council. Despite running under the slogan "I shall remain" (in Portuguese: "Eu fico"), he left City Council shortly afterwards to focus on the 2002 elections.

In 1993, Paulo Portas said of Marcelo Rebelo de Sousa that he was an unreliable source for O Independente's, and had given an account of a political VIP dinner that had never taken place going as far as inventing that the soup served during the dinner was Vichyssoise. Later, Marcelo Rebelo de Sousa, in 1999 when he was leader of Portugal's Social Democratic Party (PSD), sought an elections alliance with Paulo Portas's CDS-PP that was initially agreed but collapsed shortly. Marcelo then had to resign from the PSD leadership.

=== Minister of Defence, 2002-05 ===
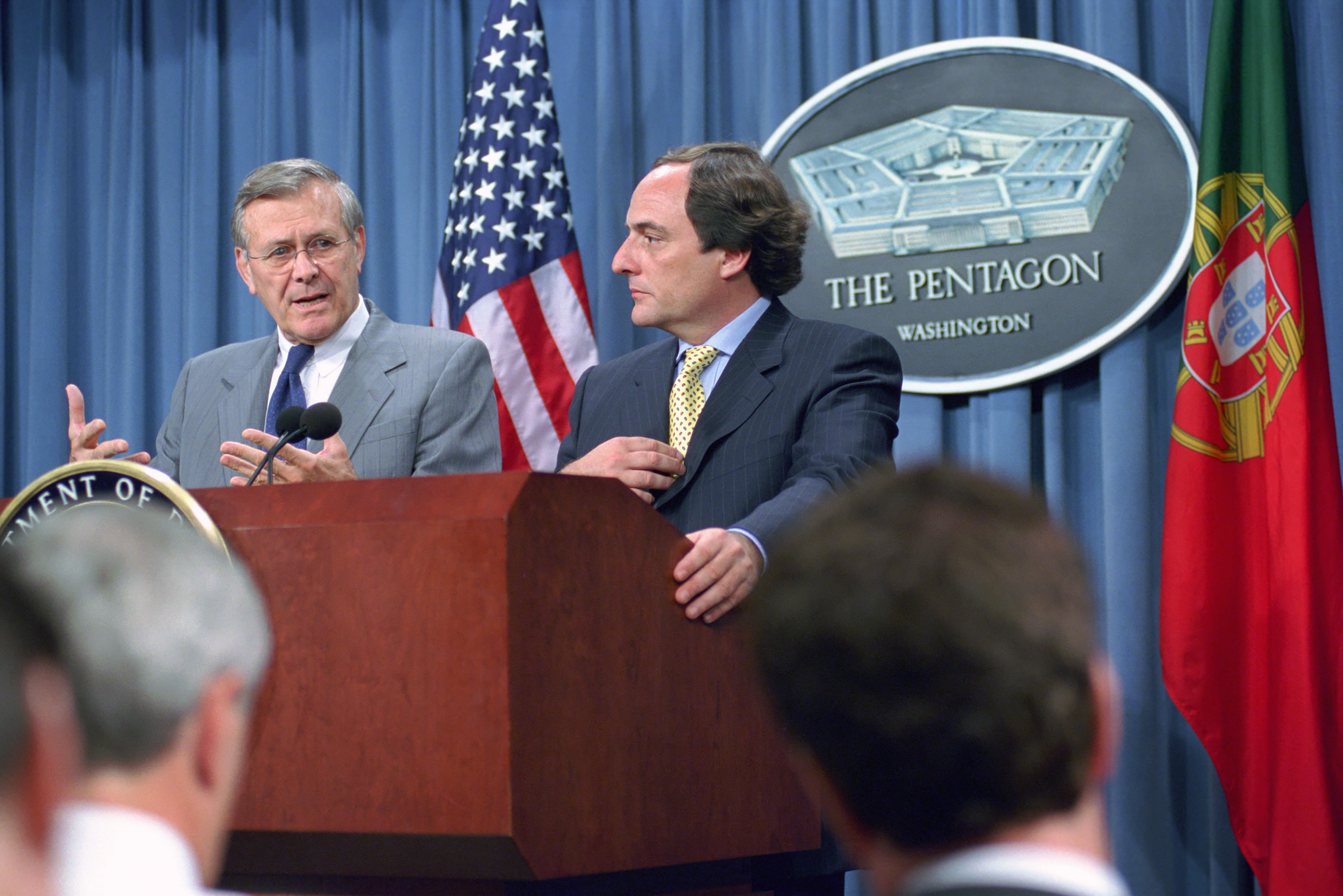
Paulo Portas with U.S. Secretary of Defense Donald Rumsfeld during a visit to the Department of Defense in 2002 when Portas claimed to have seen "irrefutable evidence of Iraq's weapons of mass destruction" that turned out to never have existed.

In the 2002 legislative elections, the CDS-PP won 8.7 percent of the vote and 14 Parliament seats, which were sufficient to form a government majority with the PSD that won the election. The CDS-PP participated in two coalition governments from April 2002 to March 2005 and Portas served as Minister of State and National Defence in the first (Durão Barroso) and Minister of State, National Defence and Maritime Affairs in the second (Pedro Santana Lopes). As Minister of Defence, he presided over important reforms of the military, such as abolishing conscription, but his most lasting legacy was the upgrade of military equipment in the context of the 2003 "Military Programming Law" that envisaged a major boost in military equipment spending to 5,341 million euros, including two submarines and 260 combat vehicles that would become the subject of much controversy after he left office. As Minister of Defense, Paulo Portas was also determinant in aligning Portugal with George W. Bush's 2003 Iraq invasion by saying he had personally "seen irrefutable evidence of weapons of mass destruction" while on an official visit to Washington. He was subsequently awarded the Department of Defense Medal for Distinguished Public Service by the USA's Defense Department.

=== Back in Parliament, 2006–11 ===
In the 2005 early elections, the two incumbent coalition parties suffered a crushing defeat, with CDS-PP losing 60,000 votes and two of its fourteen seats in Parliament. Paulo Portas assumed the responsibility for the defeat and resigned from the party leadership but not from his seat in parliament. He failed to get his preferred successor (Telmo Correia) elected, but some of his staunchest party allies managed to remain in control of the party's Directorate (the "National Congress") setting the stage for Paulo Portas to return in 2007 in what his brief successor José Ribeiro e Castro called "a coup d'etat." Paulo Portas had accused Ribeiro Castro of being an ineffective absentee leader (for keeping his post at the European Parliament) and called for party elections open to all CDS-PP supporters gambling that he would capture the support of the less involved party members. Ribeiro e Castro questioned the legality of Portas' challenge but, in April 2007, he was soundly defeated by Portas who got 70% of the militants' votes and would remain as CDS-PP president until 2016. For the next six years, Paulo Portas led his party in the opposition to the ruling Socialist Party (PS). His new strategy for the party was to focus on a few major issues (such as agriculture, tax cuts, fuel prices) in order for CDS-PP to retain conservative voters, who, in the past, supported CDS-PP but voted PSD at election time. In 2009 he personally ran for local office in the small municipality of Arouca (population: 20,000) and was elected to the Municipal Assembly significantly boosting CDS-PP's votes in the region. In 2006–07, just prior to regaining the party leadership, Paulo Portas again had been a leading 'No!' voice against the legalization of abortion in Portugal in the 2007 referendum that was won by the "Yes!" vote that reversed the "No!" outcome of the 1998 referendum.

=== Minister of State and Foreign Affairs, 2011–13 ===
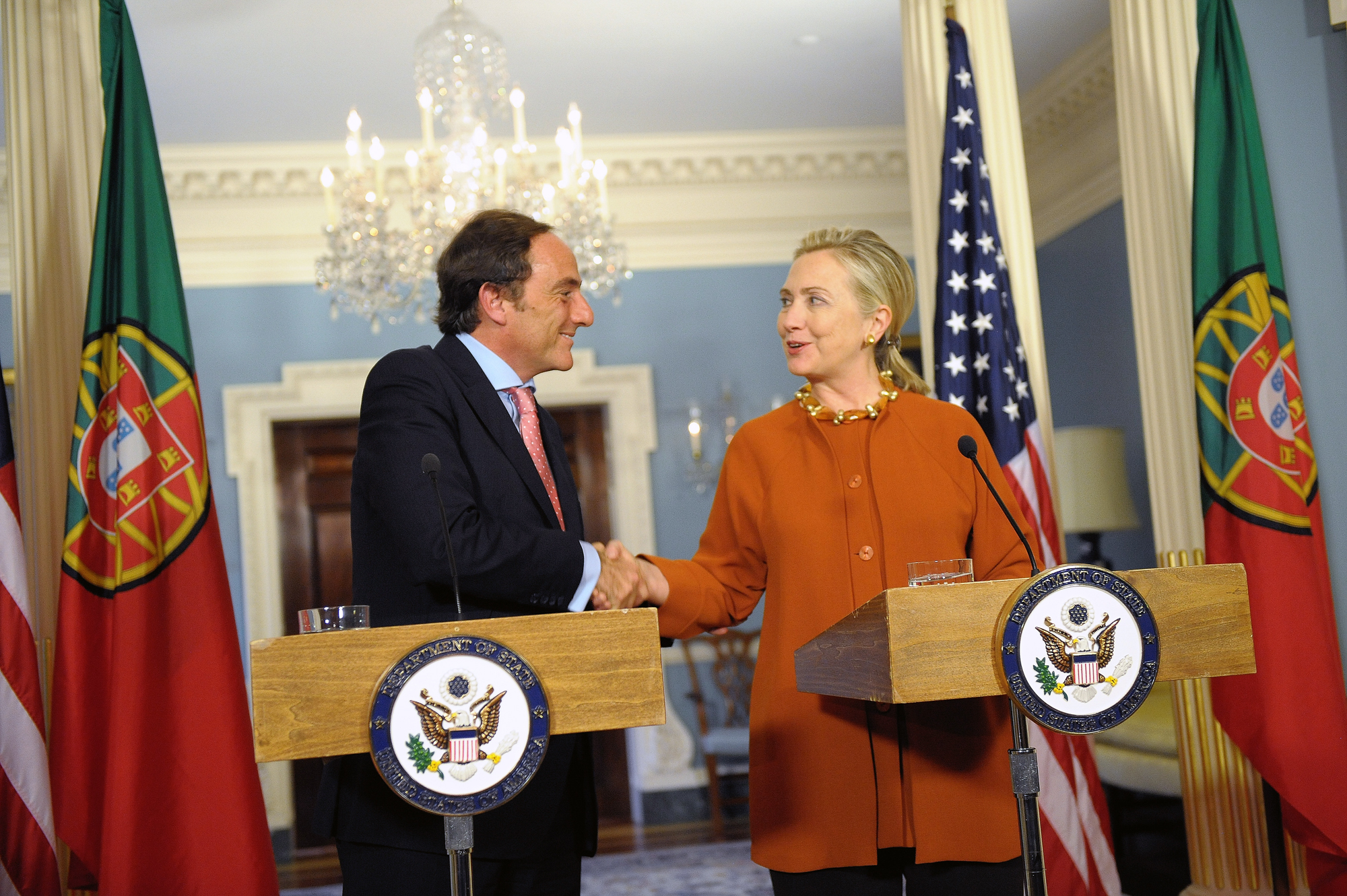
Paulo Portas with Secretary of State Hillary Clinton during a visit to the State Department in 2011 to discuss Middle East and EU affairs.

In the 2011 elections, Portas's opposition strategies paid off and the CDS-PP achieved its best result in 30 years: 11.7% of the total vote. The winning party, the PSD, needed the CDS-PP to reach a parliamentary majority and the two parties formed a coalition government. By his own choice, Portas became Minister of State and of Foreign Affairs and secured two more minister slots for the CDS-PP, including the Minister of Agriculture position for his youthful female protégée Assunção Cristas, who would five years later succeed Portas in the CDS-PP party's leadership. As minister, Portas chose (and relished) devoting himself fully to performing his official functions, in particular traveling abroad. He made his priority what he called "economic diplomacy", meaning the generation through diplomacy of business opportunities abroad for Portuguese companies. To that effect, he wrestled control of the Portuguese Foreign Investment and Trade Agency (AICEP) from the Ministry of Economics. In 2013, to attract foreign investments, Paulo Portas instituted "golden visas" to make it possible for non-EU foreigners to obtain Portuguese residency if they invested at least 500,000 euros in Portuguese real estate. By focusing on his duties as Minister of Foreign Affairs, he also managed to distance himself from the difficult decisions related to Portugal's economic austerity program. More than once he kept silent or expressed his disagreement with unpopular measures taken by the government to which he belonged, and on 2 July 2013 he abruptly resigned in protest at the appointment of a Finance Minister (Maria Luís Albuquerque) he did not approve of, a decision he called "irrevocable" but that he subsequently revoked.

=== Deputy Prime-Minister, 2013–15 ===
When Paulo Portas resigned from the government in July 2013, Prime-Minister Passos Coelho feared the end of his coalition government and negotiated with Paulo Portas his permanence in a higher capacity as Deputy Prime Minister with oversight over economic issues. Paulo Portas also obtained control of the Ministry of Economy where he placed two close associates: minister António Pires de Lima (his close childhood friend) and state secretary Adolfo Mesquita Nunes (his youthful protégé in the CDS-PP party). In control of the key ministries of Economics, Agriculture, Labor and Social Security (held by his CDS-PP ministers), Paulo Portas came to wield political power far beyond the 12% of the national vote his party received in the 2011 elections. As part of his Deputy Prime-Minister attributions, Paulo Portas took charge of the negotiations on Portugal's IMF/EC/ECB-supported program, the terms of which he had publicly declared to be against. However, his only visible act of defiance was the setting up, in December 2013, of a "countdown clock" showing the time remaining until the expiration of the program on 17 May 2014. Through the rest of his mandate that ended in 2015, he raised no major new policy proposals or objections in his capacity as Deputy Prime-Minister, choosing instead to use his economic policy oversight position to travel the world promoting Portuguese companies and products in what appears to have been a continuation of the "economic diplomacy" priority he had established as Minister of Foreign Affairs.

In 2015 Paulo Portas agreed to an electoral alliance between his CDS-PP party and its government coalition partner PSD party as to jointly maximize their numbers of elected members of Parliament on 4 October 2015 Portuguese legislative elections. The alliance (PAF, Portugal in Front) came first in the elections but fell short of a parliamentary majority. Despite upfront opposition from the new majority-holding parties, the PAF alliance accepted to form a minority government and Paulo Portas was re-conducted on 30 October 2015 as Deputy Prime Minister of Portugal's XX Constitutional Government. However, he stayed in office less than a month as his government's program was predictably rejected in Parliament and replaced by a Socialist Party government supported by the far-left parties.

=== Retirement from CDS-PP Party Leadership, 2016 ===
Having ceased his functions as Deputy Prime-Minister on 26 November 2015, Paulo Portas presented himself in Parliament the following day to take up the position for which he had been elected on 4 October by the Lisbon electoral district. However, one month later (28 December 2015) he announced his resignation from the CDS-PP Party leadership and from his elected position in Parliament on the grounds that "it was time for a new political cycle (...) and for a new generation" to take over the party leadership. Accordingly, on 13 March 2016, Paulo Portas stepped down in acclaim at a special convention of his CDS-PP party where he was replaced by his longtime protégée and former government colleague Assunção Cristas. Shortly afterwards, he became vice-president of the Portuguese Chamber of Commerce—a non-remunerated position that allowed him to continue traveling to promote Portuguese enterprises abroad as he had been doing in the government. He left Parliament in June 2016 to return to political commentary on TV with a weekly show on TVI Portugal.

== Controversies ==
=== Ministry of Defence ===
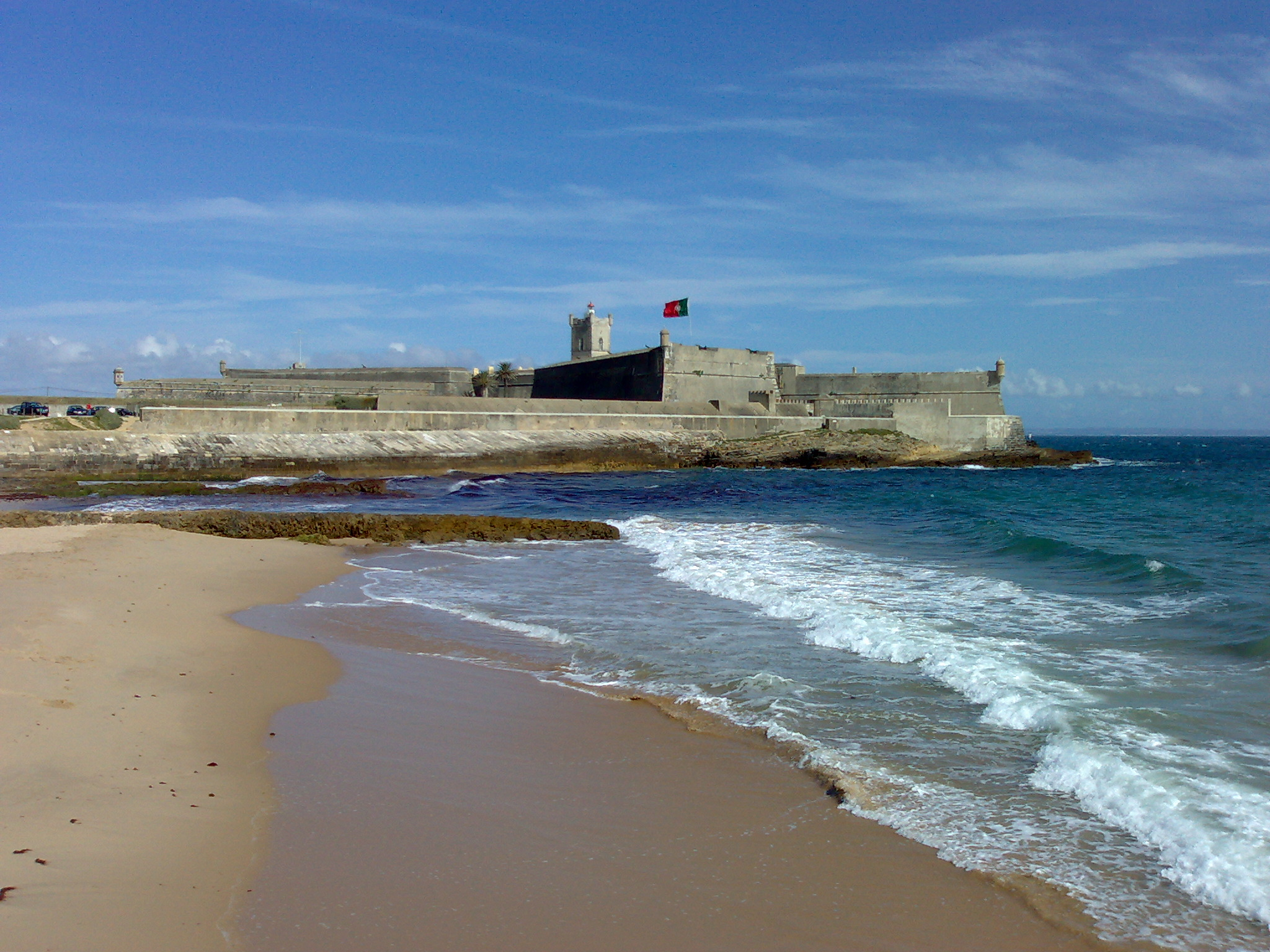
The historic fort of São Julião da Barra where Paulo Portas took up residence upon becoming Minister of Defense.

In 2002, Portas became Minister of Defence and made a historic seafront fort of São Julião da Barra his "official residence". Paulo Portas was the first Minister of Defence to openly move into the fort, which resulted in the closing of most of the historic monument to the public and in new remodeling and upkeep costs for Portas's occupancy. He defended his move to the fort as "a gain for the State." Upon becoming Minister of Defence in 2002, Paulo Portas also rescinded a previous contract for the purchase of nine EC-635 helicopters from European manufacturer Eurocopter Group on the grounds that the helicopters had not been delivered when stipulated. He then considered rescinding another existing contract for the purchase of twelve helicopters NH-90, manufactured by Nato Helicopters Industries (a subsidiary of Eurocopter Group) and buy American-made Blackhawk helicopters instead but he eventually authorized the NH-90 helicopters purchase in the amount of 420 million euros. Paulo Portas then went ahead with the purchase of twelve EH101 helicopters from manufacturer AgustaWestland at a total cost of 300 million euros for Portugal. However the purchase price for the EH101s did not include their maintenance, which subsequently added an extra 120 million euros to the price and raised questions on whether the helicopter deals were in the best interests of Portugal both in terms of the high cost and the multiple configurations.

=== The "irrevocable" resignation from Cabinet ===
In 2013, when Portas resigned "from the Government" he stated in his press communiqué that his resignation was "irrevocable" but then agreed to stay on in the government in a higher capacity as Deputy Prime-Minister. Portas' resignation was reported to be an impulsive but genuine gesture of protest, to distance himself from an increasingly unpopular government that went awry. Portas explained his change of mind about resigning saying he "preferred to pay a reputation price for a better future" and that "the country comes first."

== Personal life ==
Portas is a lifelong bachelor, who has never publicly assumed a romantic relationship and who invariably attends his many official functions unescorted or in the casual company of socialite women known to be attached to other men. He has no children but has expressed his wish to "become a father one day." Portas is known to be a fan of Parov Stelar, a well-known Electro swing musician, and a supporter of Lisbon football team Sporting Clube de Portugal. He is also reported to be a compulsive cigarette smoker, a cinephile and a history-buff.

== Electoral history ==
=== CDS–PP leadership election, 1998 ===
Ballot: 22 March 1998
Candidate	Votes	%
Paulo Portas	WIN	
Maria José Nogueira Pinto		
Turnout		
Source: CDS Congress

=== European Parliament election, 1999 ===
Ballot: 13 June 1999
Party	Candidate	Votes	%	Seats	+/−
PS	Mário Soares	1,493,146	43.1	12	+2
PSD	Pacheco Pereira	1,078,528	31.1	9	±0
CDU	Ilda Figueiredo	357,671	10.3	2	–1
CDS–PP	Paulo Portas	283,067	8.2	2	–1
BE	Miguel Portas	61,920	1.8	0	new
Other parties		79,619	2.3	0	±0
Blank/Invalid ballots		113,134	3.3	–	–
Turnout		3,467,085	39.93	25	±0
Source: Comissão Nacional de Eleições

=== Legislative election, 1999 ===
Ballot: 10 October 1999
Party	Candidate	Votes	%	Seats	+/−
PS	António Guterres	2,385,922	44.1	115	+3
PSD	José Manuel Durão Barroso	1,750,158	32.3	81	–7
CDU	Carlos Carvalhas	487,058	9.0	17	+2
CDS–PP	Paulo Portas	451,643	8.3	15	±0
BE	Francisco Louçã	132,333	2.4	2	new
Other parties		99,842	1.8	0	±0
Blank/Invalid ballots		108,194	2.0	–	–
Turnout		5,415,102	61.02	230	±0
Source: Comissão Nacional de Eleições

=== Lisbon City Council election, 2001 ===
Ballot: 16 December 2001
Party	Candidate	Votes	%	Seats	+/−
PSD/PPM	Pedro Santana Lopes	131,094	42.1	8	+1
PS/CDU	João Soares	129,368	41.5	8	–2
CDS–PP	Paulo Portas	23,637	7.6	1	±0
BE	Miguel Portas	11,899	3.8	0	new
Other parties		5,766	1.9	0	±0
Blank/Invalid ballots		9,718	3.1	–	–
Turnout		311,482	54.83	17	±0
Source: Autárquicas 2001

=== Legislative election, 2002 ===
Ballot: 17 March 2002
Party	Candidate	Votes	%	Seats	+/−
PSD	José Manuel Durão Barroso	2,200,765	40.2	105	+24
PS	Eduardo Ferro Rodrigues	2,068,584	37.8	96	–19
CDS–PP	Paulo Portas	477,350	8.7	14	–1
CDU	Carlos Carvalhas	379,870	6.9	12	–5
BE	Francisco Louçã	153,877	2.8	3	+1
Other parties		88,542	1.6	0	±0
Blank/Invalid ballots		107,774	2.0	–	–
Turnout		5,473,655	61.48	230	±0
Source: Comissão Nacional de Eleições

=== Legislative election, 2005 ===
Ballot: 20 February 2005
Party	Candidate	Votes	%	Seats	+/−
PS	José Sócrates	2,588,312	45.0	121	+25
PSD	Pedro Santana Lopes	1,653,425	28.8	75	–30
CDU	Jerónimo de Sousa	433,369	7.5	14	+2
CDS–PP	Paulo Portas	416,415	7.3	12	–2
BE	Francisco Louçã	364,971	6.4	8	+5
Other parties		122,127	2.1	0	±0
Blank/Invalid ballots		169,052	2.9	–	–
Turnout		5,747,834	64.26	230	±0
Source: Comissão Nacional de Eleições

=== CDS–PP leadership election, 2007 ===
Ballot: 21 April 2007
Candidate	Votes	%
Paulo Portas	5,642	74.6
José Ribeiro e Castro	1,883	24.9
Blank/Invalid ballots	38	0.5
Turnout	7,563	
Source: Results

=== Legislative election, 2009 ===
Ballot: 27 September 2009
Party	Candidate	Votes	%	Seats	+/−
PS	José Sócrates	2,077,238	36.6	97	–24
PSD	Manuela Ferreira Leite	1,653,665	29.1	81	+6
CDS–PP	Paulo Portas	592,778	10.4	21	+9
BE	Francisco Louçã	557,306	9.8	16	+8
CDU	Jerónimo de Sousa	446,279	7.9	15	+1
Other parties		178,012	3.1	0	±0
Blank/Invalid ballots		175,980	3.1	–	–
Turnout		5,681,258	59.68	230	±0
Source: Comissão Nacional de Eleições

=== Legislative election, 2011 ===
Ballot: 5 June 2011
Party	Candidate	Votes	%	Seats	+/−
PSD	Pedro Passos Coelho	2,159,181	38.7	108	+27
PS	José Sócrates	1,566,347	28.0	74	–23
CDS–PP	Paulo Portas	653,888	11.7	24	+3
CDU	Jerónimo de Sousa	441,147	7.9	16	+1
BE	Francisco Louçã	288,923	5.2	8	–8
PCTP/MRPP	Garcia Pereira	62,610	1.1	0	±0
PAN	Paulo Borges	57,995	1.0	0	new
Other parties		126,521	2.3	0	±0
Blank/Invalid ballots		228,017	4.1	–	–
Turnout		5,585,054	58.03	230	±0
Source: Comissão Nacional de Eleições

== Honours ==
=== Foreign ===
- Mexico: Sash of the Order of the Aztec Eagle (7 October 2014)
- Peru Grand Cross of the Order of the Sun of Peru (16 October 2016)
- Poland: Commander's Cross with Star of the Order of Merit of the Republic of Poland (16 July 2012)
- Romania: Commander of the Order of the Star of Romania (16 October 2016)
- Spain: Commander by Number of the Order of Civil Merit (17 August 1988)

Party political offices
Preceded by Manuel Monteiro	President of the People's Party; 1998–2005	Succeeded by José Ribeiro e Castro
Preceded by José Ribeiro e Castro	President of the People's Party; 2007–present	Succeeded by Assunção Cristas
Political offices
Preceded by Rui Pena	Minister of National Defence; 2002–2005	Succeeded by Luís Amado
Preceded by Jorge Coelho	Minister of State; 2002–2005	Succeeded by António Costa; Diogo Freitas do Amaral; Luís Campos e Cunha
Preceded by Luís Amado	Minister of Foreign Affairs; 2011–2013	Succeeded by Rui Machete
Preceded by Fernando Teixeira dos Santos; Luís Amado	Minister of State; 2011–2013	Succeeded by Rui Machete
Vacant Title last held by Eurico de Melo	Deputy Prime Minister of Portugal; 2013–2015	Vacant
