= Miguel Portas =

Portuguese politician (1958–2012)

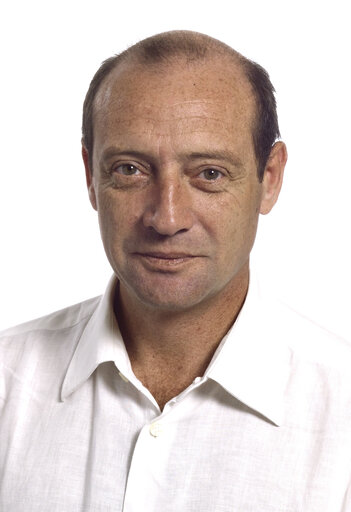
- Official portrait as an MEP, 2004

Member of the European Parliament
- In office 20 July 2004 – 24 April 2012
- Constituency: Portugal

Personal details
- Born: Miguel de Sacadura Cabral Portas; 1 May 1958 Lisbon, Portugal
- Died: 24 April 2012 (aged 53) Antwerp, Belgium
- Party: Left Bloc (1999–2012)
- Other political affiliations: Portuguese Communist Party (1973–1989); Platform of the Left (1992–1994); Politics XXI (1994–1999)
- Children: 3
- Relatives: Paulo Portas (brother); Catarina Portas (half-sister); Sacadura Cabral (great-uncle)
- Education: Technical University of Lisbon

Miguel de Sacadura Cabral Portas (1 May 1958 – 24 April 2012) was a Portuguese politician and a Member of the European Parliament for the Left Bloc, part of the European United Left–Nordic Green Left group. He was a member of the Committee on Culture and Education of the European Parliament and a member of the Delegation for relations with the Mashreq countries.

Miguel Portas was the older brother of the former Foreign Affairs Minister and former leader of the right-wing CDS–PP, Paulo Portas, and a great-nephew of Artur de Sacadura Cabral.

== Biography ==
Miguel Portas received a degree in economics, at School of Economics and Management, in 1986. He worked as a cultural animator in the county of Ourique (1984), sociocultural animator and trainer in the Algarve hills as agents of development (1987). Moving on a career as a journalist, he was director of the cultural magazine "Contraste" (1986) and later he was hired as editor of the weekly journal "Expresso" (1988), where he was the international editor between 1992 and 1994. He also directed the weekly "Já" (1996), he was a reporter for magazine "Vida Mundial" (1998–1999), columnist for "Diário de Notícias" (2000–2006) and the weekly "Sol" (2008–2012). He was co-author and host of two television documentary series, "Indian Ocean" (2000) and "Periplus" (2004), on the Mediterranean. He had three books published: "And the rest is landscape" (2002, chronicles, essays and interviews), "The Labyrinth" (2006 – on Lebanon) and "Periplus" (2009 – dedicated to the Mediterranean).

Arrested by Salazarist secret police PIDE when he was 15 for participating in the Associative Movement of Students in Secondary Education in Lisbon, he joined the Union of Communist Students of PCP (1973), reaching the Central Committee a year later. He chaired the Association of Students of the School of Economics and coordinated the Inter-Secretariat Meeting of Associations. He left the CFP in 1989, following the first process of party expulsions triggered by perestroika. Between 1990 and 1991 he was an adviser to the Mayor of Lisbon on cultural affairs and urban planning. He was a founder of the Platform of the Left, dissolved two years later. In 1994 he created Politics XXI, which grouped members of the Platform of the Left, the MDP and independents from the demonstrations against tuition fees in higher education. Politics XXI was a launching platform for the Left Bloc (founded in 1999 with people from PSR, UDP and independents). For the Left Bloc he was head of the list for European Parliament elections in 1999, obtaining 1.74% of the votes, and candidate for City Council in Lisbon in 2001. He was elected to the European Parliament in 2004 with a 4.92% share and re-elected in 2009, with 10.73%. There he was a member of the Budget Committee and vice chairman of the Special Commission on Financial, Economic and Social matters.

Miguel Portas was the son of Nuno Portas, architect, and Helena de Sacadura, economist and journalist; brother of Paulo Portas, politician, half-brother of Catarina Portas, journalist and entrepreneur. He was also great-nephew of the Aviator Sacadura Cabral. He left two sons, André and Frederico Portas. With Ana Maria Isabel Soromenho Gorjão Henriques he also had a son, Frederico de Sacadura Cabral Gorjão Henriques.

Portas was diagnosed with lung cancer in 2010, and he died of the disease on 24 April 2012.
