= Miguel Esteves Cardoso =

Portuguese writer and translator

- Born: Miguel Vicente Esteves Cardoso; July 25, 1955 (age 71); Lisbon
- Education: University of Manchester
- Occupations: Writer, Journalist
- Writing career
- Language: Portuguese

Miguel Vicente Esteves Cardoso (born 25 July 1955) is a Portuguese writer, translator, critic and journalist. He is a well-known monarchist.

== Early life ==
Cardoso was born in an upper-middle-class family in Lisbon. His father, Joaquim Carlos Esteves Cardoso (1920 – 4 July 1994), was Portuguese and his mother (m. 1954), Hazel Diana Smith, was English. He had a good education and the advantage of a bilingual and bicultural upbringing, helping him to develop an outsider's detachment from the culture of his birth country. In 1979, he graduated from Manchester University in political studies and four years later, in 1983, he received his doctorate in Political Philosophy. While there he made contact with some of the new wave bands of Factory Records including Joy Division and New Order, and arranged for the recording of the Durutti Column album Amigos em Portugal as well as providing its cover art.

He married for the first time on 21 January 1981 and shortly after became the father of twin girls, socialites Sara and Tristana Esteves Cardoso, born in Lisbon. One year later he returned to Portugal, where he worked as an assisting investigator for the Social Studies Institute on the Lisbon University. He later became a supporting teacher of political sociology for ISCTE and then returned to Manchester University to work on his post-doctorate in Political Philosophy oriented by Derek Parfit and Joseph Raz.

== Writing and music career ==
Esteves Cardoso began writing freelance reviews of popular music for newspapers, among them Se7e, O Jornal, JL - Jornal de Letras, Artes e Ideias and Música & Som. Eventually, he co-founded (with Pedro Ayres Magalhães, Ricardo Camacho e Francisco Sande e Castro) Portugal's first independent record label called Fundação Atlântica, which would publish Portuguese bands such as Xutos e Pontapés, Delfins, and Sétima Legião. Esteves Cardoso was the author or co-author of many programs for the station Rádio Comercial including Tópico de Dança and Aqui Rádio Silêncio. Esteves Cardoso soon began to appear on television, gaining notice for his intellectual look mixed with irreverent humor. One of his more notable and controversial appearances was on the SIC channel talk-show A Noite da Má-Língua along with Manuel Serrão, Rui Zink, Rita Blanco, Júlia Pinheiro and other guests.

Esteves Cardoso began his career as a journalist when he started contributing a column to the weekly paper Expresso, later collected and published in four volumes, all of which sold over 100,000 copies and are still in print. In 1988, with Paulo Portas, he founded the very successful and innovative weekly paper O Independente but he left the board in 1991 to dedicate his time to the magazine K, financed by Valentim de Carvalho, SOCI and later also by Carlos Barbosa.

After the demise of K, Esteves Cardoso returned to literature. His first novel O Amor é Fodido sold well, perhaps in part due to the obscene title ("Love is Fucked"). His second and third novels, A Vida Inteira and O Cemitério de Raparigas, were well received and are still in print.

In 1997 he married for the second time, to Maria João Pinheiro, a former model and weather presenter.

He continued to write essays for O Independente (which published its last number in September 2006) and Diário de Notícias. Between 1999 and 2002, he wrote in his blog named Pastilhas. In January 2006 he returned to the weekly paper Expresso and in November 2006 published his most recent collection, A Minha Andorinha.

On 13 February 2009 he welcomed his first grandchild, António Cardoso Coutinho, born in Lisbon, a natural son of his daughter Tristana by Bruno Coutinho.

== Bibliography ==
=== Collected reviews and columns ===
- Escrítica Pop (1982)
- A Causa das Coisas (1986)
- Os Meus Problemas (1988)
- As Minhas Aventuras na República Portuguesa (1990)
- Último Volume (1991)
- Explicações de Português (2001)
- A Minha Andorinha (2006)
- Lorelei
- O Musical

=== Novels ===
- O Amor é Fodido (1994)
- A Vida Inteira (1995)
- Cemitério de Raparigas (1996)

^† These volumes collected his Expresso columns.
