= Ilda Figueiredo =

Portuguese politician

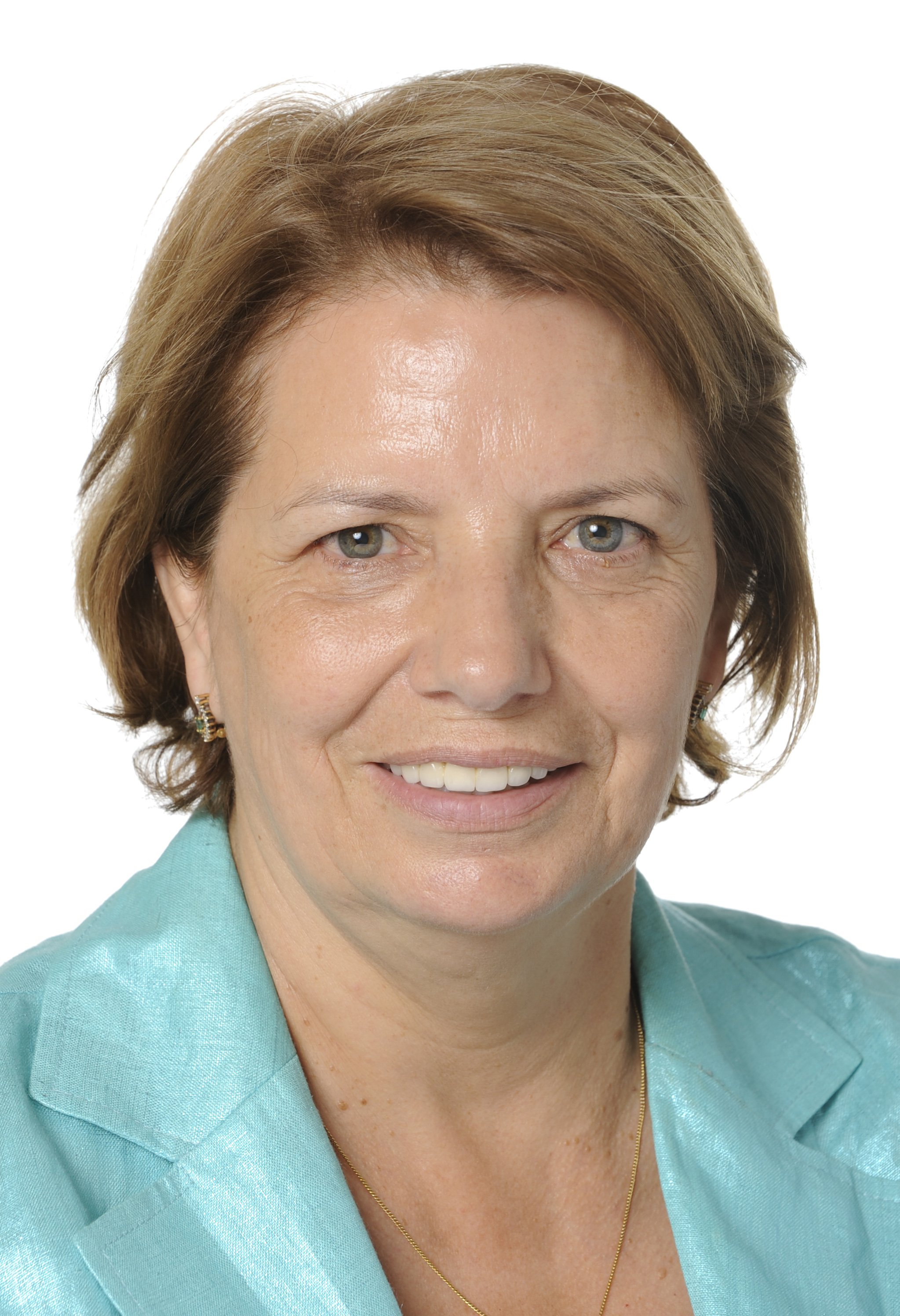
- Born: Maria Ilda da Costa Figueiredo; 30 October 1948 (age 77); Troviscal, Oliveira do Bairro, Portugal
- Occupation: Politician
- Political party: Portuguese Communist Party

Maria Ilda da Costa Figueiredo (born 30 October 1948) is a Portuguese politician and a former Member of the European Parliament for the Portuguese Communist Party, part of the European United Left - Nordic Green Left group.

She was a substitute for the Committee on Agriculture and Rural Development and the Delegation to the EU-Romania Joint Parliamentary Committee.

== Education ==
In 1973, she was a graduated with an M.A. in Economics. In 1998, she entered the Educational Planning and Administration. She served as an economist for the Porto Textile Workers' Union and the Porto Trade Union Confederation of CGTP. She has been a teacher at primary, secondary and university levels.

== Career ==
From 1979 to 1991, she was a member of the Assembly of the Republic. She was a member of Vila Nova de Gaia town council (1983–1991), and member of the Porto city council. She was member of the Gaia Municipal Assembly. She is a member of the Central Committee of the Portuguese Communist Party (PCP). From 1999 to 2012, she was a Member of the European Parliament.
