= 1979 Portuguese legislative election =

- 2 December 1979

All 250 seats in the Assembly of the Republic 126 seats needed for a majority
- Registered: 7,249,346 ▲10.4%
- Turnout: 6,007,453 (82.9%) ▼0.6 pp
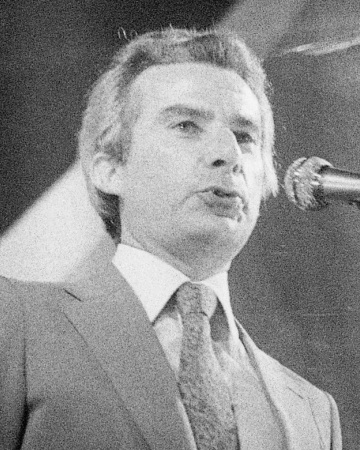

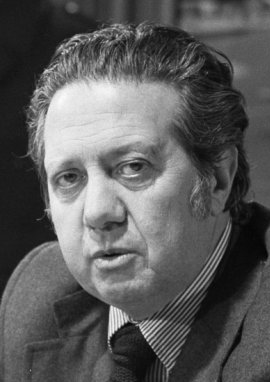

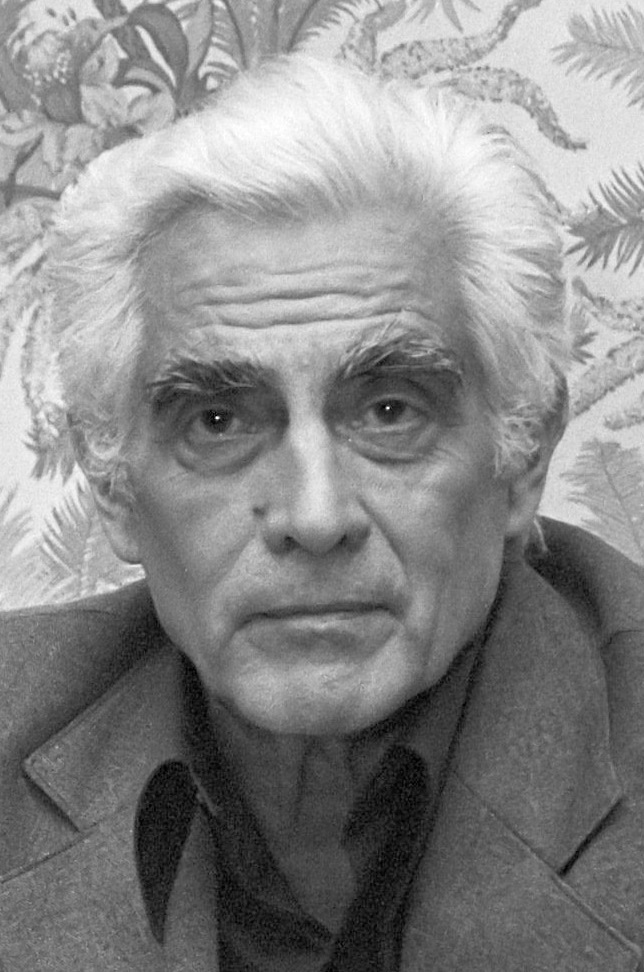

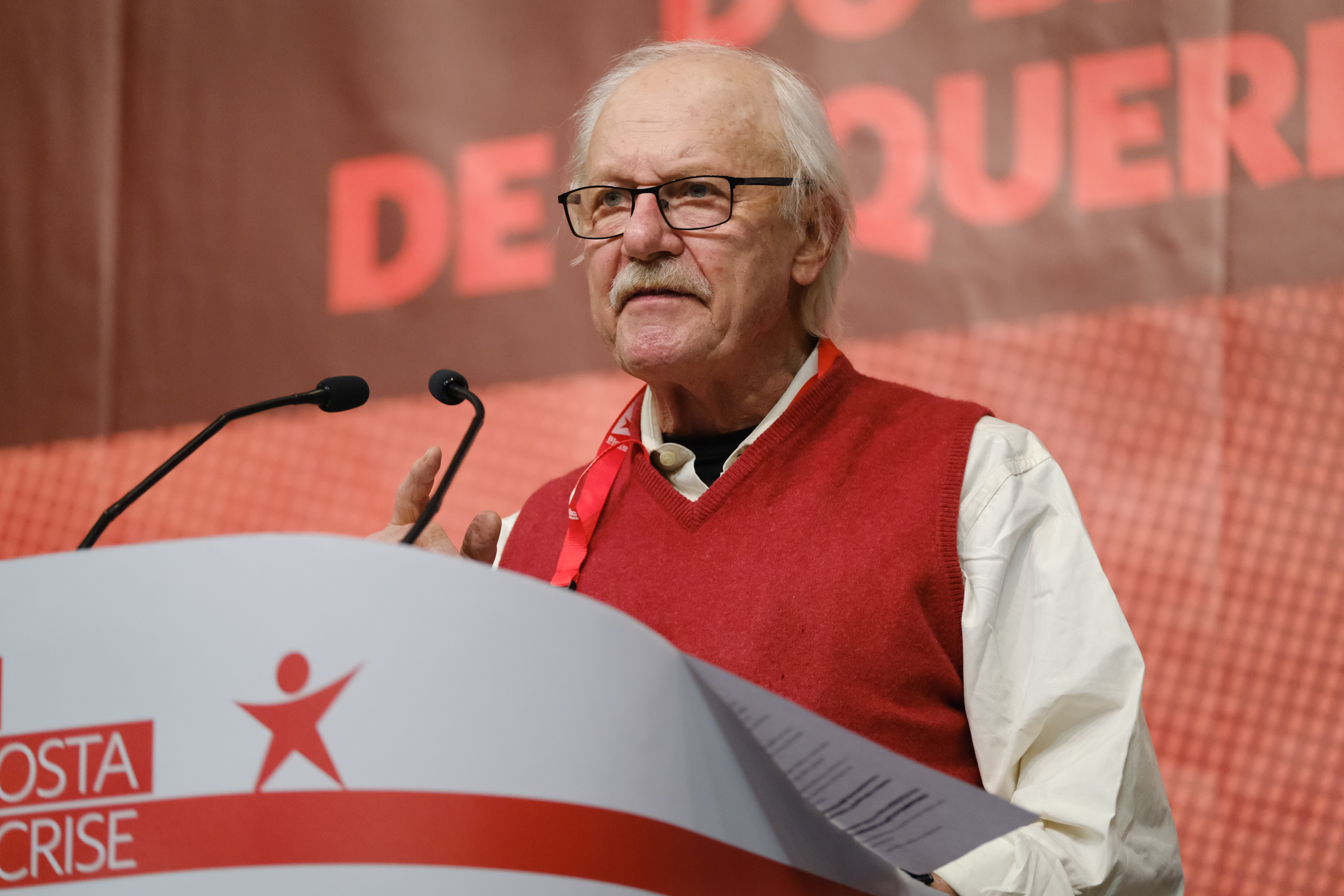
| | First party | Second party |
|---|---|---|
| Leader | Francisco Sá Carneiro | Mário Soares |
| Party | PSD | PS |
| Alliance | AD |
| Leader since | 2 July 1978 (Note: As leader of the Social Democratic Party (PSD).) | 19 April 1973 |
| Leader's seat | Lisbon | Lisbon |
| Last election | 115 seats, 40.9% (Note: Democratic Alliance results are compared to the combined totals of the Social Democratic Party, the Democratic and Social Centre and the People's Monarchist Party in the 1976 election.) | 107 seats, 34.9% |
| Seats before | 110^{†} | 105^{†} |
| Seats won | 128 | 74 |
| Seat change | ▲18* | ▼31* |
| Popular vote | 2,719,208 | 1,642,136 |
| Percentage | 45.3% | 27.3% |
| Swing | ▲4.4 pp | ▼7.6 pp |
| | Third party | Fourth party |
| Leader | Álvaro Cunhal | Mário Tomé |
| Party | PCP | UDP |
| Alliance | APU |
| Leader since | 14 April 1978 | 1979 |
| Leader's seat | Lisbon | Lisbon |
| Last election | 40 seats, 14.4% | 1 seat, 1.7% |
| Seats before | 34^{†} | 1^{†} |
| Seats won | 47 | 1 |
| Seat change | ▲13* | 0 |
| Popular vote | 1,129,322 | 130,842 |
| Percentage | 18.8% | 2.2% |
| Swing | ▲4.4 pp | ▲0.5 pp |
Prime Minister before election
Maria de Lurdes Pintasilgo
Independent
Prime Minister after election
Francisco Sá Carneiro
PSD

The 1979 Portuguese legislative election took place on 2 December. The election renewed all 250 members of the Assembly of the Republic, 13 seats less than those elected in 1976.

The special election was called by President António Ramalho Eanes in the summer of 1979 after three years of great instability, from Prime Minister Mário Soares' government collapsing in August 1978 to a succession of two ineffective Presidential appointed governments. Until the election, Eanes nominated Maria de Lourdes Pintasilgo, the first and still only woman to lead a government in Portugal, as prime minister.

In the election, the right-wing parties, the Social Democratic Party, the Democratic and Social Center and the People's Monarchist Party, united in the Democratic Alliance (Portuguese: Aliança Democrática or AD) under the leadership of Sá Carneiro, scored a historic victory, receiving 45 percent of the votes and an absolute majority in seats, the first right-wing and absolute majority win after the 1974 Carnation Revolution. The Socialists lost more than 30 MPs and the Communists, now allied with the Portuguese Democratic Movement in the United People Alliance achieved their highest total ever, with almost 20% of the voting, while the Popular Democratic Union (UDP) held on to its sole seat.

Another election would be held a year later, in October 1980, as determined by the decree that approved the Constitution, which stipulated that the first legislature had a fixed date of completion on 14 October 1980.

Turnout dropped slightly to 82.6 percent, but the number of ballots cast surpassed 6 million.

== Background ==
In the previous election, three and a half years earlier, in April 1976, the Socialist Party won and Mário Soares became the Prime Minister of the 1st Constitutional Government after the revolution. However, the Government faced deep financial problems, having to ask for a loan from the International Monetary Fund (IMF), and in December 1977, Soares lost a vote of confidence in Parliament by 159 votes to 100, as all opposition parties—the Democratic and Social Centre (CDS), the Social Democrats (PSD), and the Communists (PCP)—united to vote against him, and thus, the Soares government fell. Soares would become Prime Minister again in January 1978, in coalition with the Democratic and Social Centre (branded as "putting socialism in the drawer"), but by July of the same year, CDS would force the end of the government due to disagreements about agrarian reforms, and President Ramalho Eanes dismissed Mário Soares from office.

A couple of failed presidential initiative governments followed. In August, Alfredo Nobre da Costa became prime minister by personal decision of President Eanes, however, Nobre da Costa's government program was rejected by parliament and two months later, Nobre da Costa was replaced by Carlos Mota Pinto who would govern with extreme difficulties for less than one year, facing strong parliamentary obstruction.

In July 1979, the President finally decided to dissolve Parliament and call for a new election for December of the same year. Mota Pinto was replaced in the period between the dissolution and the election by Maria de Lourdes Pintasilgo, the first and still only woman to lead a government in Portuguese history.

=== Leadership changes and challenges ===
==== Social Democratic Party ====
The PSD suffered a lot of internal divisions after the 1976 election. The party was essential divided between those who wanted the party to pursue a more social democratic path, and those who want a more center-right approach, these aligned with Francisco Sá Carneiro. Because of these disputes, Sá Carneiro leaves the leadership in November 1977, and is succeeded by António Sousa Franco, who moves the party more to the left. But, internal divisions continue, and in June 1978, a group of 42 PSD MPs release the "Unpostponable Options" manifesto where they attack Sá Carneiro and reaffirm the social democratic path with a candidacy to the Socialist International. Sá Carneiro returns to the leadership in the July 1978 party congress and one year later, 37 PSD MPs break with him and leave definitely the party, forming the Independent Social Democratic Action (ASDI), which would merge with the PS a few years later.

Ballot: 2 July 1978
| Candidate | Votes | % |
|---|---|---|
| Francisco Sá Carneiro | 603 | 91.9 |
| Blank/Invalid ballots | 53 | 8.1 |
| Turnout | 656 | |
Source: Diário de Lisboa

A few months after the congress that reinstated Sá Carneiro in the party's leadership, negotiations began between the PSD and CDS, and later also with the PPM, to form a coalition in order to contest the following election, with an agreement to form the Democratic Alliance (AD) being reached in July 1979.

== Electoral system ==
The Assembly of the Republic has 250 members elected to four-year terms. The total number of MPs was reduced to 250 from the previous 263, elected in 1976. Governments do not require absolute majority support of the Assembly to hold office, as even if the number of opposers of government is larger than that of the supporters, the number of opposers still needs to be equal or greater than 126 (absolute majority) for both the Government's Programme to be rejected or for a motion of no confidence to be approved.

The number of seats assigned to each district depends on the district magnitude. The use of the d'Hondt method makes for a higher effective threshold than certain other allocation methods such as the Hare quota or Sainte-Laguë method, which are more generous to small parties.

For these elections, and compared with the 1976 elections, the MPs distributed by districts were the following:

| District | Number of MPs | Map |
|---|---|---|
| Lisbon^{(–2)} | 56 | |
| Porto | 38 | |
| Setúbal | 17 | |
| Aveiro and Braga | 15 | |
| Santarém^{(–1)} and Coimbra | 12 | |
| Leiria | 11 | |
| Viseu^{(–1)} | 10 | |
| Faro | 9 | |
| Castelo Branco^{(–1)}, Viana do Castelo^{(–1)} and Vila Real^{(–1)} | 6 | |
| Azores^{(–1)}, Beja^{(–1)}, Évora^{(–1)}, Guarda^{(–1)} and Madeira^{(–1)} | 5 | |
| Bragança^{(–1)} and Portalegre | 4 | |
| Europe and Outside Europe | 2 | |

== Parties ==
The table below lists the parties represented in the Assembly of the Republic during the first half of the 1st legislature (1976–1980), as this election was a national by-election, and that also contested the elections:

=== With the 1976 seat distribution ===
| Name | | Ideology | Political position | Leader | 1976 result | | Seats at dissolution |
| Name | | Ideology | Political position | Leader | % | Seats | Seats at dissolution |
|---|---|---|---|---|---|---|---|
| PS | Socialist Party; Partido Socialista | Social democracy | Centre-left | Mário Soares | 34.9% | 107 / 263 | 102 / 263 |
| PPD/PSD | Social Democratic Party; Partido Social Democrata | Liberal conservatism | Centre-right | Francisco Sá Carneiro | 24.4% (Note: The Social Democratic Party (PSD), the Democratic Social Center (CDS) and the People's Monarchist Party (PPM) would contest the 1979 election in a coalition called Democratic Alliance (AD).) | 73 / 263 | 36 / 263 |
| CDS | Democratic and Social Center; Centro Democrático e Social | Christian democracy | Centre-right to right-wing | Diogo Freitas do Amaral | 16.0% | 42 / 263 | 41 / 263 |
| PCP | Portuguese Communist Party; Partido Comunista Português | Communism | Far-left | Álvaro Cunhal | 14.4% (Note: The Portuguese Communist Party (PCP) and the Portuguese Democratic Movement (MDP/CDE) would contest the 1979 election in a coalition called United People Alliance (APU).) | 40 / 263 | 40 / 263 |
| UDP | Popular Democratic Union; União Democrática Popular | Marxism; Socialism | Left-wing | Mário Tomé | 1.7% | 1 / 263 | 1 / 263 |
| ASDI | Independent Social Democratic Action; Acção Social Democrata Independente | Democratic Socialism; Social democracy | Centre-left | António de Sousa Franco | N/A | | 37 / 263 |
| Ind. | Independent; Independente | Carmelinda Pereira (left the Socialist Party caucus); Aires Rodrigues (left the Socialist Party caucus); Carlos Galvão de Melo (left the Democratic and Social Center caucus); António Lopes Cardoso (left the Socialist Party caucus); José Justiniano Pinto (left the Socialist Party caucus); Reinaldo Rodrigues (left the Socialist Party caucus) | | | | | 6 / 263 |

==== Seat changes ====
- In January 1977, MPs Carmelinda Pereira and Aires Rodrigues were expelled from the Socialist Party caucus.
- In March 1977, MP Carlos Galvão de Melo left the Democratic and Social Center caucus.
- In November 1977, MPs António Lopes Cardoso, José Justiniano Pinto and Reinaldo Rodrigues left the Socialist Party caucus due to disagreements with the government led by Mário Soares.
- In July 1979, 37 MPs from the Social Democratic Party, led by António de Sousa Franco and Joaquim Magalhães Mota, left the party and formed a new party, the Independent Social Democratic Action, following a feud with PSD leader Francisco Sá Carneiro, in which was called the "Unpostponable Options" split, regarding the ideological path of the party.

=== 1976 results with the new seat distribution ===
| Name | | Ideology | Political position | Leader | 1976 notional result | |
| Name | | Ideology | Political position | Leader | % | Seats |
|---|---|---|---|---|---|---|
| PS | Socialist Party; Partido Socialista | Social democracy | Centre-left | Mário Soares | 34.9% | 105 / 250 |
| PPD/PSD | Social Democratic Party; Partido Social Democrata | Liberal conservatism | Centre-right | Francisco Sá Carneiro | 24.4% | 70 / 250 |
| CDS | Democratic and Social Center; Centro Democrático e Social | Christian democracy | Centre-right to right-wing | Diogo Freitas do Amaral | 16.0% | 40 / 250 |
| PCP | Portuguese Communist Party; Partido Comunista Português | Communism | Far-left | Álvaro Cunhal | 14.4% | 34 / 250 |
| UDP | Popular Democratic Union; União Democrática Popular | Marxism; Socialism | Left-wing | Mário Tomé | 1.7% | 1 / 250 |

== Campaign period ==
=== Issues ===
During the campaign, the Democratic Alliance (AD) ran on a platform for a strong and stable government, a revitalized private sector and for an improvement in living conditions. Sá Carneiro, the Alliance's leader, asserted that he would not accept to form a government if the AD failed to win a majority. The Socialist Party (PS), shaken after its time in unpopular governments marked by austerity and a decline in the population's quality of life, campaigned on the premise of being the center of Portuguese politics and the only party capable of preventing the polarization of society. The new communist alliance, the United People Alliance (APU) ran under the message of defending democracy against the reaction.

=== Party slogans ===
| Party or alliance | Original slogan | English translation | Refs |
|---|---|---|---|
| AD | « A maioria certa » | "The right majority" | |
| PS | « O direito à liberdade » | "The right to freedom" | |
| APU | « Para a vitória democrática » | "For the democratic victory" | |
| UDP | « O voto certo da mudança » | "The right vote for change" | |

== Results ==
=== National summary ===
| Party or alliance | | Votes | % | +/– | Seats | +/– |
|---|---|---|---|---|---|---|
| Democratic Alliance | Democratic Alliance (Note: Alliance formed by the Social Democratic Party (73 seats), the Democratic and Social Centre (43 seats) and the People's Monarchist Party (5 seats).) | 2,554,458 | 42.52 | — | 121 | — |
| Democratic Alliance | Social Democratic Party (Note: Social Democratic Party and Democratic and Social Centre electoral list only in Azores and Madeira.) | 141,227 | 2.35 | — | 7 | — |
| Democratic Alliance | Democratic and Social Centre | 23,523 | 0.39 | — | 0 | — |
| Democratic Alliance | Total | 2,719,208 | 45.26 | +6.20 | 128 | +13 |
| Socialist Party | | 1,642,136 | 27.33 | –7.56 | 74 | –33 |
| United People Alliance (Note: Portuguese Communist Party (44 MPs) and Portuguese Democratic Movement (3 MPs) ran in coalition.) | | 1,129,322 | 18.80 | +4.41 | 47 | +7 |
| Popular Democratic Union | | 130,842 | 2.18 | +0.51 | 1 | 0 |
| Christian Democratic Party | | 72,514 | 1.21 | +0.73 | 0 | 0 |
| Portuguese Workers' Communist Party | | 53,268 | 0.89 | +0.23 | 0 | 0 |
| Left-wing Union for the Socialist Democracy | | 43,325 | 0.72 | New | 0 | New |
| Revolutionary Socialist Party | | 36,978 | 0.62 | +0.23 | 0 | 0 |
| Workers' Party of Socialist Unity | | 12,713 | 0.21 | New | 0 | New |
| Portuguese Marxist–Leninist Communist Organization | | 3,433 | 0.06 | New | 0 | New |
| Total | | 5,843,739 | 100.00 | – | 250 | –13 |
| Valid votes | | 5,843,739 | 97.27 | +1.97 | | |
| Invalid votes | | 120,851 | 2.01 | –2.69 | | |
| Blank votes | | 42,863 | 0.71 | | | |
| Total votes | | 6,007,453 | 100.00 | – | | |
| Registered voters/turnout | | 7,249,346 | 82.87 | –0.66 | | |
Source: Comissão Nacional de Eleições

Vote share
| AD | 42.52% |
| PS | 27.33% |
| APU | 18.80% |
| PSD | 2.35% |
| UDP | 2.18% |
| PDC | 1.21% |
| PCTP/MRPP | 0.89% |
| UEDS | 0.72% |
| PSR | 0.62% |
| Others | 0.66% |
| Blank/Invalid | 2.72% |

Parliamentary seats
| AD | 48.40% |
| PS | 29.60% |
| APU | 18.80% |
| PSD | 2.80% |
| UDP | 0.40% |

=== Distribution by constituency ===
Results of the 1979 election of the Portuguese Assembly of the Republic by constituency
| Constituency | % | S | % | S | % | S | % | S | % | S | Total S |
| Constituency | AD | | PS | | APU | | PSD | | UDP | | Total S |
|---|---|---|---|---|---|---|---|---|---|---|---|
| Azores | | | 30.0 | 2 | 3.1 | - | 52.0 | 3 | 1.7 | - | 5 |
| Aveiro | 56.7 | 9 | 28.4 | 5 | 7.9 | 1 | | | 1.2 | - | 15 |
| Beja | 19.0 | 1 | 22.0 | 1 | 50.7 | 3 | | | 1.8 | - | 5 |
| Braga | 51.9 | 9 | 30.2 | 5 | 10.0 | 1 | | | 1.4 | - | 15 |
| Bragança | 60.7 | 3 | 22.2 | 1 | 5.8 | - | | | 1.9 | - | 4 |
| Castelo Branco | 49.9 | 4 | 27.8 | 2 | 12.4 | - | | | 1.9 | - | 6 |
| Coimbra | 44.8 | 6 | 35.1 | 5 | 11.2 | 1 | | | 1.3 | - | 12 |
| Évora | 26.9 | 1 | 16.9 | 1 | 48.9 | 3 | | | 1.7 | - | 5 |
| Faro | 34.6 | 4 | 34.0 | 3 | 20.3 | 2 | | | 3.2 | - | 9 |
| Guarda | 60.6 | 4 | 26.3 | 1 | 5.4 | - | | | 0.9 | - | 5 |
| Leiria | 56.2 | 7 | 23.2 | 3 | 10.9 | 1 | | | 1.5 | - | 11 |
| Lisbon | 40.0 | 24 | 25.8 | 15 | 26.0 | 16 | | | 2.8 | 1 | 56 |
| Madeira | | | 17.2 | 1 | 3.1 | - | 57.8 | 4 | 6.6 | - | 5 |
| Portalegre | 32.1 | 2 | 29.8 | 1 | 29.4 | 1 | | | 1.7 | - | 4 |
| Porto | 44.5 | 18 | 34.8 | 14 | 14.5 | 6 | | | 1.9 | - | 38 |
| Santarém | 41.3 | 6 | 27.3 | 3 | 21.7 | 3 | | | 2.2 | - | 12 |
| Setúbal | 22.3 | 4 | 21.4 | 4 | 47.0 | 9 | | | 4.0 | - | 17 |
| Viana do Castelo | 54.8 | 4 | 24.9 | 2 | 9.8 | - | | | 0.9 | - | 6 |
| Vila Real | 57.7 | 4 | 21.4 | 2 | 6.1 | - | | | 1.5 | - | 6 |
| Viseu | 64.1 | 8 | 21.4 | 2 | 5.5 | - | | | 1.4 | - | 10 |
| Europe | 38.3 | 1 | 33.2 | 1 | 13.4 | - | | | 5.7 | - | 2 |
| Rest of the World | 77.3 | 2 | 5.7 | - | 3.1 | - | | | 0.7 | - | 2 |
| Total | 42.5 | 121 | 27.3 | 74 | 18.8 | 47 | 2.4 | 7 | 2.2 | 1 | 250 |
Source: Comissão Nacional de Eleições

=== Maps ===
Winner and seats by constituency.

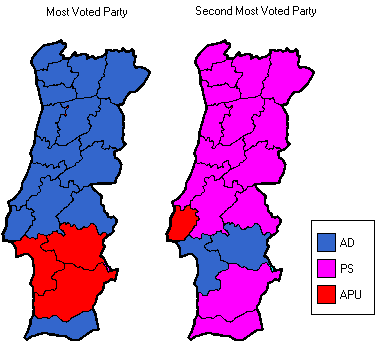
First and second most voted political force by constituency.

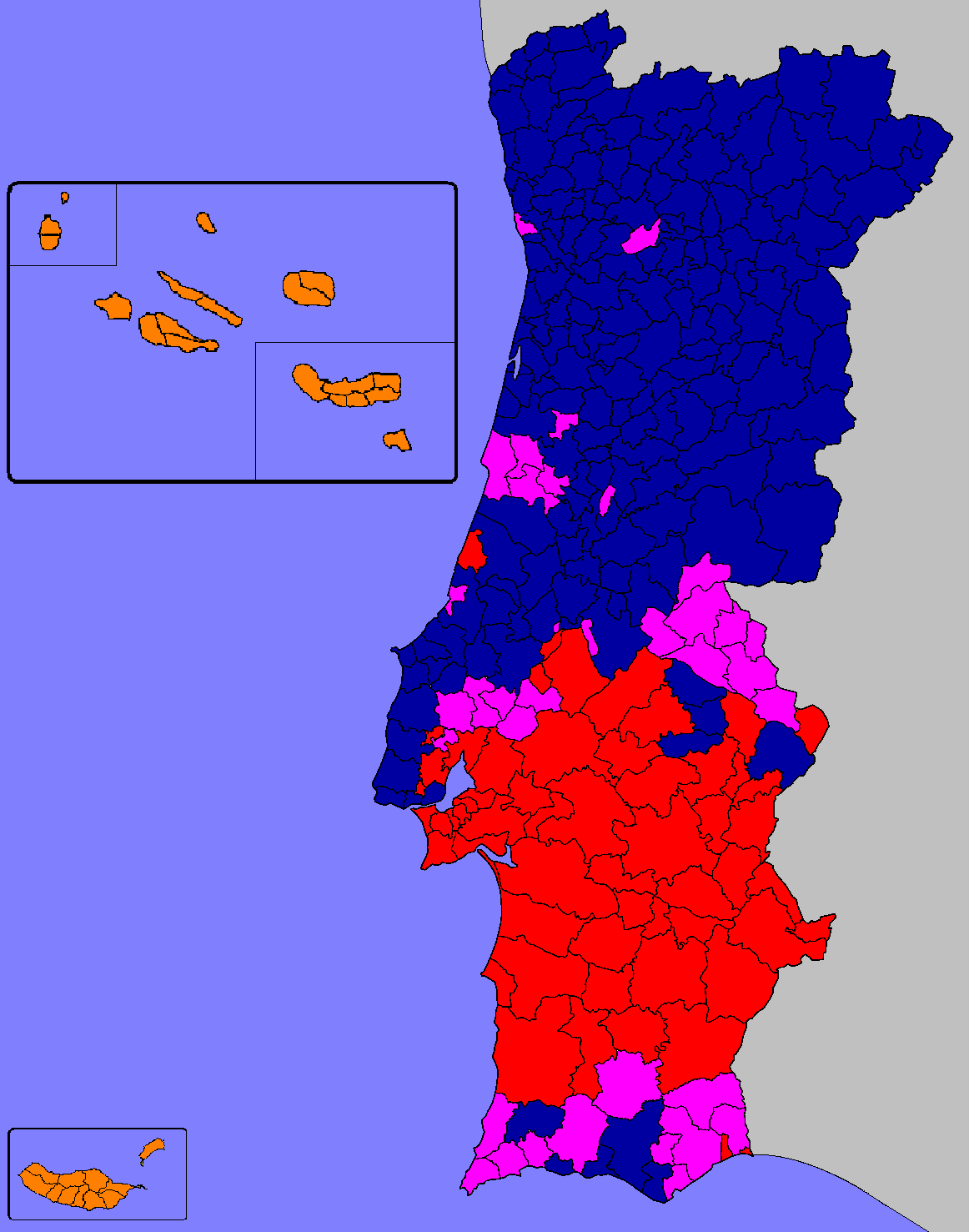
Most voted political force by municipality.

== See also ==
- Politics of Portugal
- List of political parties in Portugal
- Elections in Portugal
