= 1980 Portuguese presidential election =

- 7 December 1980
- Turnout: 84.39% (▲8.92pp)
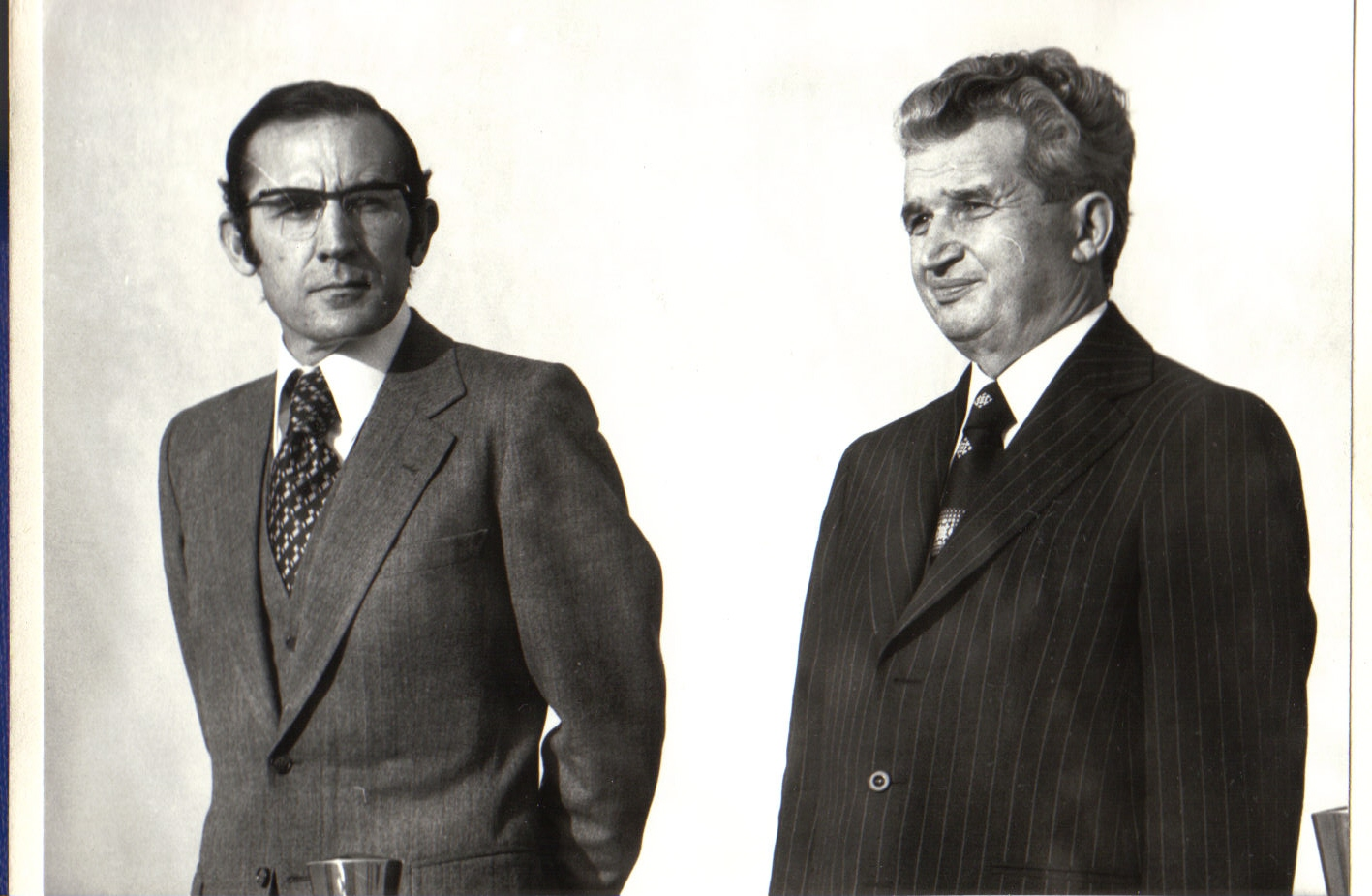

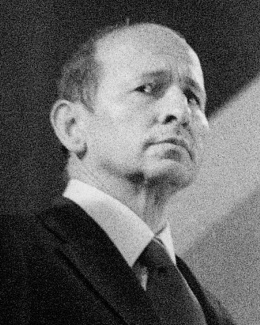
Candidate	António Ramalho Eanes	António Soares Carneiro
Party	Independent Supported by: PS; PCP; PCTP/MRPP	AD
Popular vote	3,262,520	2,325,481
Percentage	56.44%	40.23%

Eanes
40-50%
50-60%
60-70%
70-80%
80-90%
Soares
40-50%
50-60%
60-70%
70-80%
80-90%
>90%
President before election
António Ramalho Eanes
Independent
Elected President
António Ramalho Eanes
Independent

A presidential election was held in Portugal on 7 December 1980, as according to the decree that approved the Constitution, which stipulated that the first term of the President would end three months after the end of the first legislature, on 14 October 1980.

Incumbent president General Ramalho Eanes gathered the support of the Socialist Party, despite the objection of their leader, Mário Soares, and also the support of the Portuguese Communist Party, whose candidate, Carlos Brito, withdrew the week before election day, giving his support to Eanes. The Communist Party of the Portuguese Workers also supported Eanes, whose picture became a feature on numerous walls around the country, painted by Communist Party activists.

One of the major players in the democratic revolution of 1974, Otelo Saraiva de Carvalho, was also a candidate, for the second time, but finished far behind his previous result of 1976. The newly founded Workers Party of Socialist Unity presented its own candidate, Aires Rodrigues.

His main opponent, General Soares Carneiro, was supported by the ruling Democratic Alliance (AD), a centre-right coalition of the Social Democratic Party, the Democratic Social Center, and the smaller People's Monarchist Party. Nevertheless, two days before the election, the death of Francisco Sá Carneiro in a plane crash shocked the country, and despite the accident, the election went ahead as planned. The popular commotion caused by the tragic death of Sá Carneiro led some analysts to speculate that it could reverse the trend in favor of Eanes, but they were proved wrong, with Ramalho Eanes winning with 56 percent of the votes, against 40 percent for Soares Carneiro, in an election with high voter turnout, reaching more than 84 percent of registered voters. Eanes was sworn in for a second term as President on 14 January 1981.

== Background ==
Ramalho Eanes was elected president with around 61% of the votes in June 1976. However, Eanes term was marked by strong political, social and economic upheaval. Mário Soares' government, between 1976 and 1978, was characterized by deep economic problems, resulting in an IMF bailout with strong austerity measures, and political instability. Eanes himself dismissed Soares from office in the summer of 1978, following a short, and tense, coalition with the right-wing Democratic Social Center (CDS), leading Eanes to nominate a couple of failed presidential appointed cabinets in just 12 months. A special election was called for December 1979, with Maria de Lourdes Pintasilgo being appointed prime minister until the election, the first and still only woman to lead a government in Portugal. The election resulted in a majority for the center-right Democratic Alliance (AD), with early on the relationship between Eanes and the new prime minister, Francisco Sá Carneiro, being described as "tempestuous".

=== Pre-campaign ===
In the follow-up for the presidential election, Sá Carneiro himself considered running against Eanes, but his marital situation (Sá Carneiro lived with Snu Abecassis, although still married to his first wife, who refused to grant him a divorce) blocked this possibility, therefore, the candidate chosen to face Eanes, General António Soares Carneiro (no relation), wasn't his first pick as many generals also refused to challenge Eanes. Furthermore, Mário Soares refused to support Eanes against the overwhelming will of his own party, as Soares also had a very bad relationship with Eanes.

== Electoral system ==
Any Portuguese citizen over 35 years old has the opportunity to run for president. In order to do so it was necessary to gather between 7500 and 15000 signatures and submit them to the Supreme Court of Justice.

According to the Portuguese Constitution, to be elected, a candidate needs a majority of votes. If no candidate gets this majority there will take place a second round between the two most voted candidates.

== Candidates ==
=== Official candidates ===
- António Ramalho Eanes, Incumbent President since 1976 and eligible for a second term, Independent candidate supported by the Socialist Party, Portuguese Communist Party and the Portuguese Workers' Communist Party;
- António Soares Carneiro , Military officer, supported by the Democratic Alliance (AD);
- Carlos Galvão de Melo, General officer, Member of the National Salvation Junta, Independent candidate;
- Otelo Saraiva de Carvalho, Military officer, polled second place in 1976, supported by the Popular Unity Force;
- António Pires Veloso, Major general of the Portuguese Army, Independent candidate;
- António Aires Rodrigues, supported by the Workers Party of Socialist Unity
- Carlos Brito, Official candidate of the Portuguese Communist Party, Left the race to support Ramalho Eanes;

== Campaign period ==
=== Issues ===
The campaign was mostly a duel between Prime Minister Sá Carneiro and President Eanes, with the right-wing turning against Eanes, while the left-wing united around him. From the start, the AD's presidential candidate, general Soares Carneiro, failed to inspire enthusiasm even in the alliance's own electoral base, adding to this, his connections with the previous dictatorial regime also raised questions, but Sá Carneiro stood behind Soares Carneiro till the end, accusing Eanes of aligning with the Communists, of wanting to extend the military's political power and of fighting against the AD government. Under the motto "one majority, one government, one president", and recently bolstered by the October 1980 legislative election, Sá Carneiro forge ahead with his view of a major constitutional review, and even threatened to resign as prime minister if Eanes were reelected. President Eanes, on the other hand, campaigned presenting himself as an austere man, above partisan politics, with experience, and an element of "checks and balances" on the system. However, the campaign was cut short after the tragic Camarate plane crash, where Sá Carneiro and others, such as Snu Abecassis, defense minister Adelino Amaro da Costa and his wife, died on route to Porto for a last minute rally in support of Soares Carneiro.

=== Party slogans ===
Candidate	Original slogan	English translation	Refs
António Ramalho Eanes	« O Presidente de todos os Portugueses »	"The President of all Portuguese"	
António Soares Carneiro	« Maioria, Governo, Presidente » « Segurança no futuro »	"Majority, Government, President" "Safety in the future"	
Otelo Saraiva de Carvalho	« Na Presidência um amigo »	"A friend in the presidency"	
Carlos Galvão de Melo	« Candidato de Portugal »	"Portugal's candidate"	
António Pires Veloso	« Vota Portugal »	"Vote Portugal"	

== Results ==
=== National summary ===
Candidate	Party	Votes	%
António Ramalho Eanes	Independent (Note: Supported by the Socialist Party, the Portuguese Communist Party and the Portuguese Workers' Communist Party.)	3,262,520	56.44
António Soares Carneiro	Democratic Alliance	2,325,481	40.23
Otelo Saraiva de Carvalho	Popular Unity Force	85,896	1.49
Carlos Galvão de Melo	Independent	48,468	0.84
António Pires Veloso	Independent	45,132	0.78
António Aires Rodrigues	Workers Party of Socialist Unity	12,745	0.22
Total		5,780,242	100.00
Valid votes		5,780,242	98.97
Invalid votes		16,076	0.28
Blank votes		44,014	0.75
Total votes		5,840,332	100.00
Registered voters/turnout		6,920,869	84.39
Source: Comissão Nacional de Eleições

=== Results by district ===
District	Eanes		Carneiro		Otelo		Galvão de Melo		Pires Veloso		Rodrigues		Turnout
District	Votes	%	Votes	%	Votes	%	Votes	%	Votes	%	Votes	%	Turnout
Aveiro	161,264	46.09%	177,116	50.62%	2,924	0.84%	4,441	1.27%	3,441	0.98%	699	0.20%	84.56%
Azores	65,399	57.22%	46,059	40.30%	656	0.57%	1,150	1.01%	863	0.76%	175	0.20%	74.09%
Beja	87,644	74.49%	24,395	20.73%	3,210	2.73%	888	0.75%	916	0.78%	618	0.53%	82.03%
Braga	197,162	52.12%	170,796	45.15%	3,380	0.89%	2,541	0.67%	3,746	0.99%	692	0.18%	88.18%
Bragança	35,628	36.21%	59,809	60.66%	696	0.71%	745	0.76%	1,354	1.37%	294	0.30%	77.51%
Castelo Branco	80,341	55.07%	61,140	41.90%	1,500	1.03%	984	0.67%	1,570	1.08%	367	0.25%	81.74%
Coimbra	147,345	57.03%	102,930	39.84%	3,129	1.21%	2,274	0.88%	1,891	0.73%	776	0.30%	80.43%
Évora	85,820	70.40%	31,270	25.65%	2,870	2.35%	901	0.74%	587	0.48%	451	0.37%	87.02%
Faro	128,720	64.94%	61,282	30.92%	3,607	1.82%	1,934	0.98%	1,979	1.00%	699	0.35%	81.45%
Guarda	50,349	40.37%	70,556	56.68%	870	0.70%	875	0.70%	1,573	1.26%	351	0.28%	81.13%
Leiria	111,447	45.33%	126,203	51.33%	3,087	1.26%	2,655	1.08%	1,810	0.74%	678	0.28%	82.69%
Lisbon	792,652	60.72%	469,173	35.94%	24,178	1.85%	11,323	0.87%	6,019	0.46%	2,011	0.15%	86.25%
Madeira	52,208	44.34%	60,160	51.10%	2,446	2.08%	1,494	1.27%	1,198	1.02%	230	0.20%	77.46%
Portalegre	65,466	68.58%	27,485	28.79%	918	0.96%	777	0.81%	524	0.55%	285	0.30%	85.75%
Porto	523,634	57.85%	355,723	39.30%	10,251	1.13%	5,726	0.63%	8,627	0.95%	1,197	0.13%	88.17%
Santarém	173,821	61.41%	99,911	35.30%	3,901	1.38%	2,723	0.96%	1,839	0.65%	872	0.31%	83.87%
Setúbal	299,596	74.75%	82,290	20.53%	13,826	3.45%	2,804	0.70%	1,363	0.34%	919	0.23%	86.41%
Viana do Castelo	63,172	44.76%	74,052	52.47%	1,156	0.82%	991	0.70%	1,426	1.01%	328	0.23%	80.17%
Vila Real	53,884	39.06%	80,420	58.30%	969	0.70%	744	0.54%	1,538	1.11%	398	0.29%	78.65%
Viseu	82,370	36.04%	139,077	60.59%	1,934	0.84%	2,425	1.06%	2,764	1.20%	601	0.26%	79.04%
Source: SGMAI Presidential Election Results

=== Maps ===
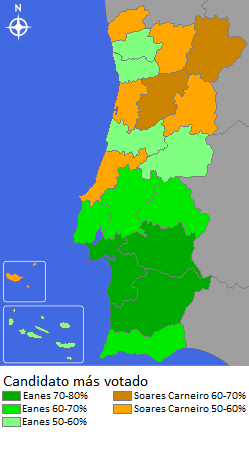
Strongest candidate by electoral district.

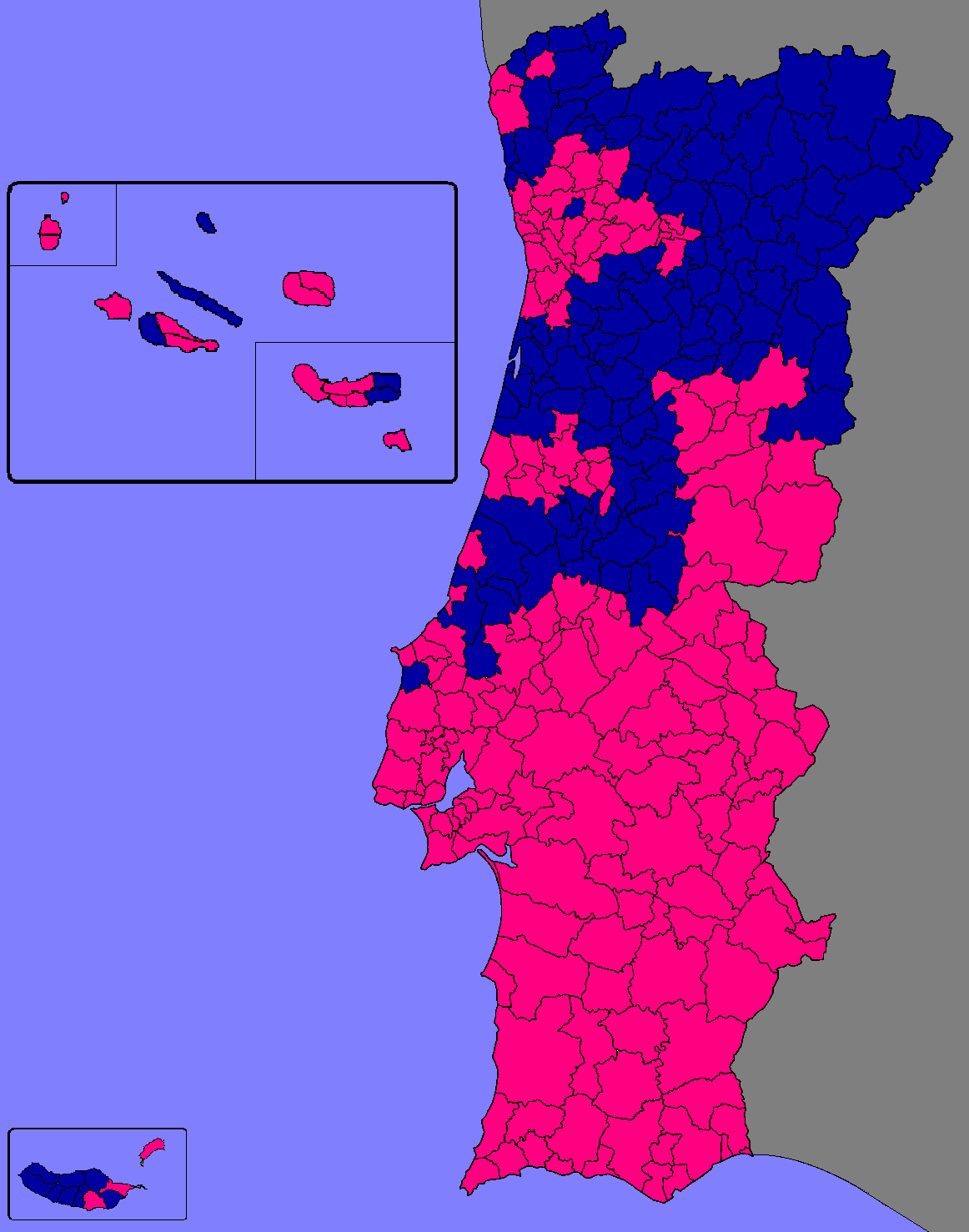
Strongest candidate by municipality: Eanes - magenta; Soares Carneiro - darkblue.
