= Carlos Brito (Portuguese politician) =

Portuguese politician (1933–2026)

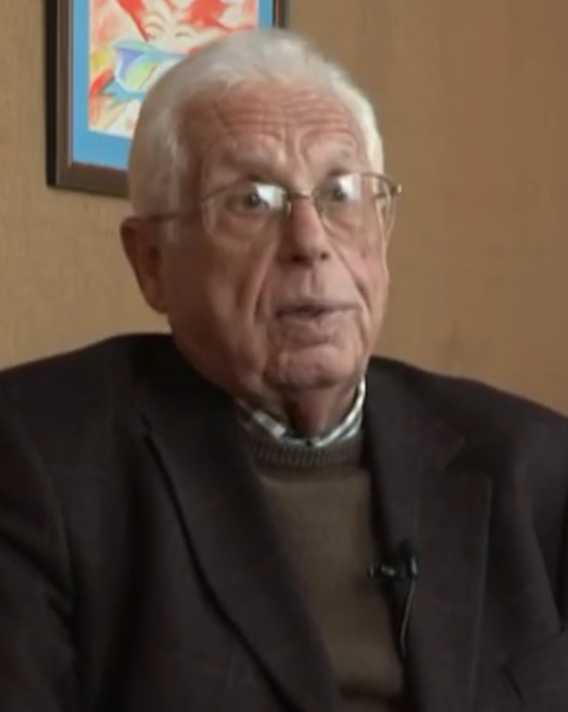
Brito in 2015

Carlos Alfredo de Brito GCIH (9 February 1933 – 7 May 2026) was a Portuguese politician.

== Life and career ==
Carlos Brito was born on 9 February 1933 in Portuguese Mozambique, but went with his family to Alcoutim, in Algarve, Portugal, when he was 3 years old. He joined the illegal Portuguese Communist Party (PCP) during the corporatist, authoritarian New State regime (1932–1974), by whom he was imprisoned.

In the 1980 presidential election, Brito was the Communist Party candidate, but withdrew shortly before the elections in support of the incumbent President, General António Ramalho Eanes, who was facing a stiff challenge from the right-wing António Soares Carneiro. He served in the Assembly of the Republic until 1991.

Brito later became a reform member of the PCP, and was suspended due to his criticism, being spared from expulsion in view of his many and historical services to the party. He supported Manuel Alegre, the independent Socialist candidate, in the 2006 presidential election.

He married the notable former PCP militant Zita Seabra, and had two daughters: Ana and Rita de Seabra Roseiro de Brito.

Brito died in Alcoutim on 7 May 2026, at the age of 93.
