= António Soares Carneiro =

Portuguese politician (1928–2014)

António Soares Carneiro OA ComI GCTE
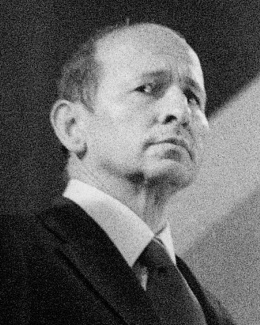
- Soares Carneiro in 1980

Chief of the General Staff of the Armed Forces
- In office 29 March 1989 – 25 January 1994
- President: Mário Soares
- Prime Minister: Aníbal Cavaco Silva
- Preceded by: José Lemos Ferreira
- Succeeded by: António Carlos Fuzeta da Ponte

Personal details
- Born: 25 January 1928 Custóias, Matosinhos, Portugal
- Died: 28 January 2014 (aged 86) Lisbon, Portugal
- Party: Democratic Alliance (1980)
- Education: Portuguese Military Academy

Military service
- Allegiance: Portugal
- Branch/service: Portuguese Army
- Rank: General

António da Silva Osório Braga Soares Carneiro, (Note: European Portuguese pronunciation: [ɐ̃ˈtɔni.u suˈaɾɨʃ kɐɾˈnɐjɾu, ɐ̃ˈtɔnju -].) OA ComI GCTE (25 January 1928 – 28 January 2014), was a Portuguese military officer. A general in the Portuguese Army, he was the governor of a southern province of Portuguese Angola during the Carnation Revolution, which deposed the Estado Novo on 25 April 1974.

In the 1980 presidential election, the right-wing Democratic Alliance, a coalition of the Social Democratic Party, the Democratic and Social Centre and the People's Monarchist Party, nominated Soares Carneiro as its candidate. Two of his leading supporters, Prime Minister Francisco Sá Carneiro (no relation) and Defence Minister Adelino Amaro da Costa died in a plane crash while heading for a rally in Porto two days before the election. Most polls suggest that the deaths did not have much influence in the result of the presidential elections since they predicted the re-election of President, General António Ramalho Eanes, who won 56% of the votes, was opposed to Soares Carneiro's 40%.

Soares Carneiro later served as Chief of the General Staff of the Armed Forces, under the presidency of Mário Soares.

He died in Lisbon.

== Electoral history ==
=== Presidential election, 1980 ===
Ballot: 7 December 1980
Candidate	Votes	%
António Ramalho Eanes	3,262,520	56.4
António Soares Carneiro	2,325,481	40.2
Otelo Saraiva de Carvalho	85,896	1.5
Carlos Galvão de Melo	48,468	0.8
António Pires Veloso	45,132	0.8
António Aires Rodrigues	12,745	0.2
Blank/Invalid ballots	60,090	–
Turnout	5,840,332	84.39
Source: Comissão Nacional de Eleições
