= António Ramalho Eanes =

President of Portugal from 1976 to 1986

His Excellency António Ramalho Eanes GCoITE CvA GColA GCL GColL GCIH GColIH GCCa
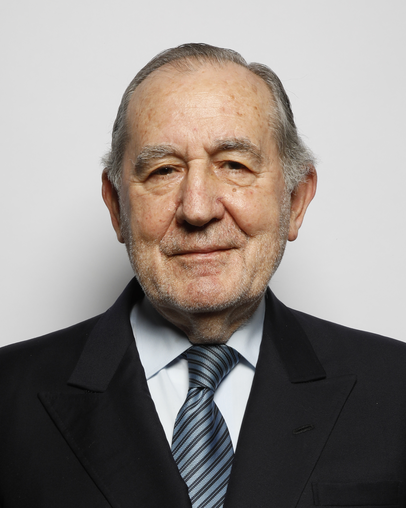
- Ramalho Eanes in 2019

President of Portugal
- In office 14 July 1976 – 9 March 1986
- Prime Minister: Mário Soares; Alfredo Nobre da Costa; Carlos Mota Pinto; Maria de Lurdes Pintasilgo; Francisco Sá Carneiro; Francisco Pinto Balsemão; Aníbal Cavaco Silva
- Preceded by: Francisco da Costa Gomes
- Succeeded by: Mário Soares

President of the Democratic Renewal Party
- In office 19 August 1986 – 5 August 1987
- Vice President: Hermínio Martinho
- Preceded by: Hermínio Martinho
- Succeeded by: Hermínio Martinho

President of the Revolutionary Council
- In office 14 July 1976 – 30 September 1982
- Preceded by: Francisco da Costa Gomes
- Succeeded by: Office abolished

Chief of the Armed Forces General Staff
- In office 30 July 1976 – 17 February 1981
- Preceded by: Francisco da Costa Gomes
- Succeeded by: Nuno de Melo Egídio

Chief of the Army General Staff
- In office 6 December 1975 – 14 July 1976
- Preceded by: Carlos Soares Fabião
- Succeeded by: Vasco Rocha Vieira

Chair of Radio and Television of Portugal
- In office 28 October 1974 – 11 March 1975
- Preceded by: Casimiro Gomes
- Succeeded by: João António de Figueiredo

Member of the Assembly of the Republic
- In office 13 August 1987 – 3 November 1991
- Constituency: Lisbon

Personal details
- Born: António dos Santos Ramalho Eanes; 25 January 1935 (age 91) Alcains, Castelo Branco, Portugal
- Party: Independent (1974–1986; 1991–present)
- Other political affiliations: Democratic Renewal Party (1986–1991)
- Spouse: Manuela Ramalho Eanes (m. 1970)
- Children: 2
- Education: Military Academy

Military service
- Allegiance: Portugal
- Branch/service: Portuguese Army
- Years of service: 1952–1986
- Rank: General
- Battles/wars: Portuguese Colonial War

António dos Santos Ramalho Eanes GCoITE CvA GColA GCL GColL GCIH GColIH GCCa (born 25 January 1935) is a Portuguese general and politician who was the president of Portugal from 1976 to 1986.

== Background ==
Born at Alcains, Castelo Branco, he is the son of Manuel dos Santos Eanes, a general contractor, and Maria do Rosário Ramalho.

== Political career ==
After a long military career in the Portuguese Colonial Wars, Eanes was stationed in Portuguese Angola when the 25 April revolution of 1974 took place. He joined the Movimento das Forças Armadas (MFA or Armed Forces Movement) and after returning to Portugal was made president of RTP (Portuguese public television). In January–February 1975, he emerged as a leader in the "operationals" faction within the Portuguese military that represented the professional interests of the officer corps. Around the same time, he was cultivated by the new US embassy team of Frank Carlucci, appointed in January 1975 by the United States Secretary of State Henry Kissinger at the advice of Deputy Director of the Central Intelligence Agency General Vernon A. Walters with the mission of "getting the communists out of the government and keeping them out"; he joined NATO training programmes following selection by Colonel Robert Schuler and Supreme Allied Commander Europe Alexander Haig, and earned the description of "a boy scout for democracy" from Carlucci's deputy Herbert S. Okun. Eanes then ordered the military counter-coup of 25 November 1975 against the pro-communist radical faction of the MFA, ending that year's "hot summer" (Verão quente).

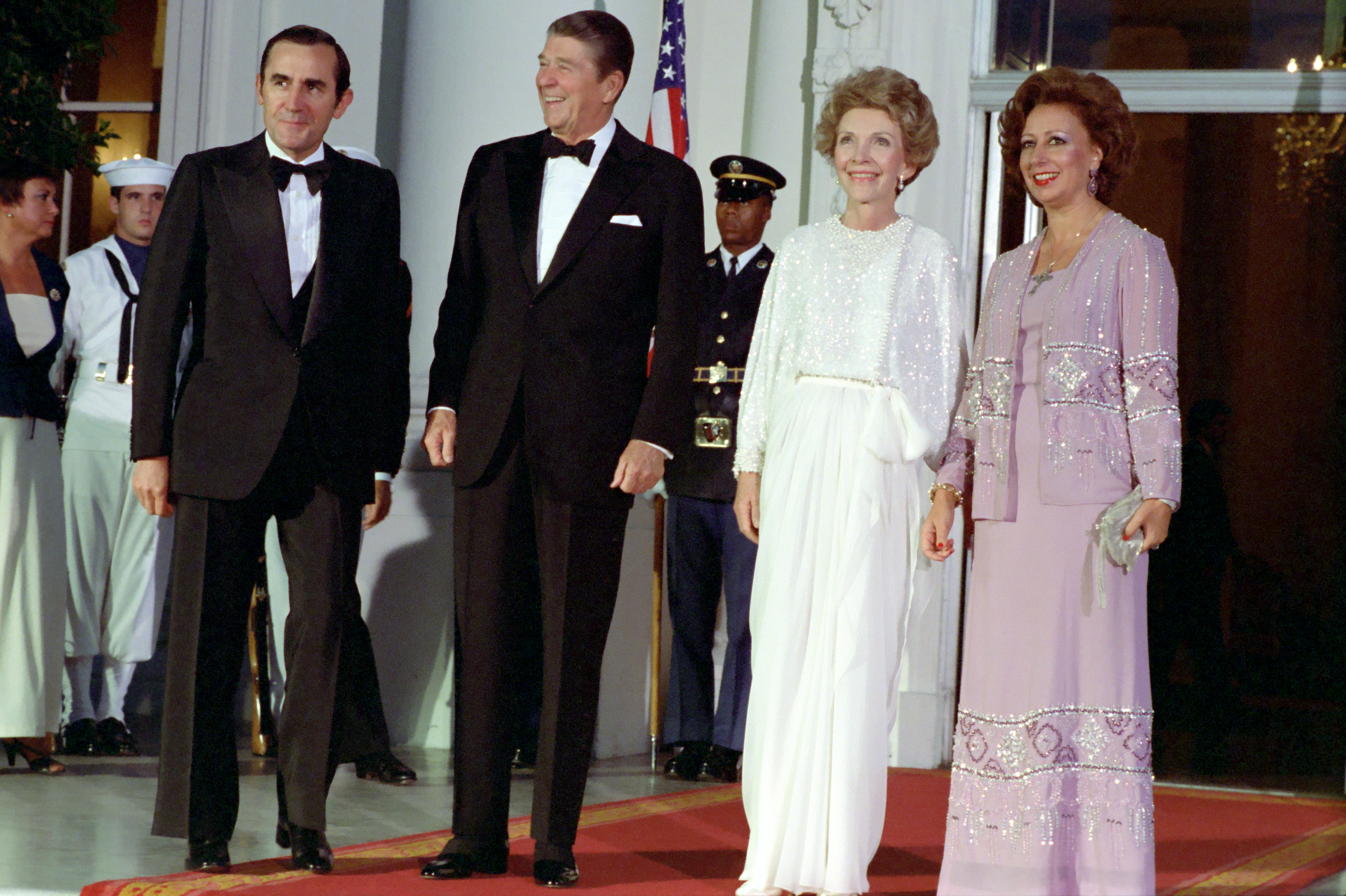
President Eanes and First Lady Manuela Eanes with U.S. president Ronald Reagan and First Lady Nancy Reagan at the White House, 1983.

In June 1976 he was elected President of Portugal with the backing of all political parties except the Communists, and simultaneously held the positions of the commander-in-chief of the Portuguese Armed Forces, chief of the Armed Forces General Staff, and head of the Council of the Revolution. He initially entrusted the Socialist Party with forming a minority government. In 1977, he established an independent commission to examine Portugal's economy, and after dismissing the Socialist PM Mário Soares in August 1978 he appointed three successive technocratic cabinets of Alfredo Nobre da Costa, Carlos Mota Pinto and Maria de Lourdes Pintasilgo, none of which lasted more than a year. At the end of 1980 he was re-elected, serving until March 1986. After his presidency, he headed the Democratic Renewal Party (Portuguese: Partido Renovador Democrático), and continued to support the Social Democratic Party (PSD) minority government until 1987. He resigned in 1987 after being defeated by PSD in the legislative election.

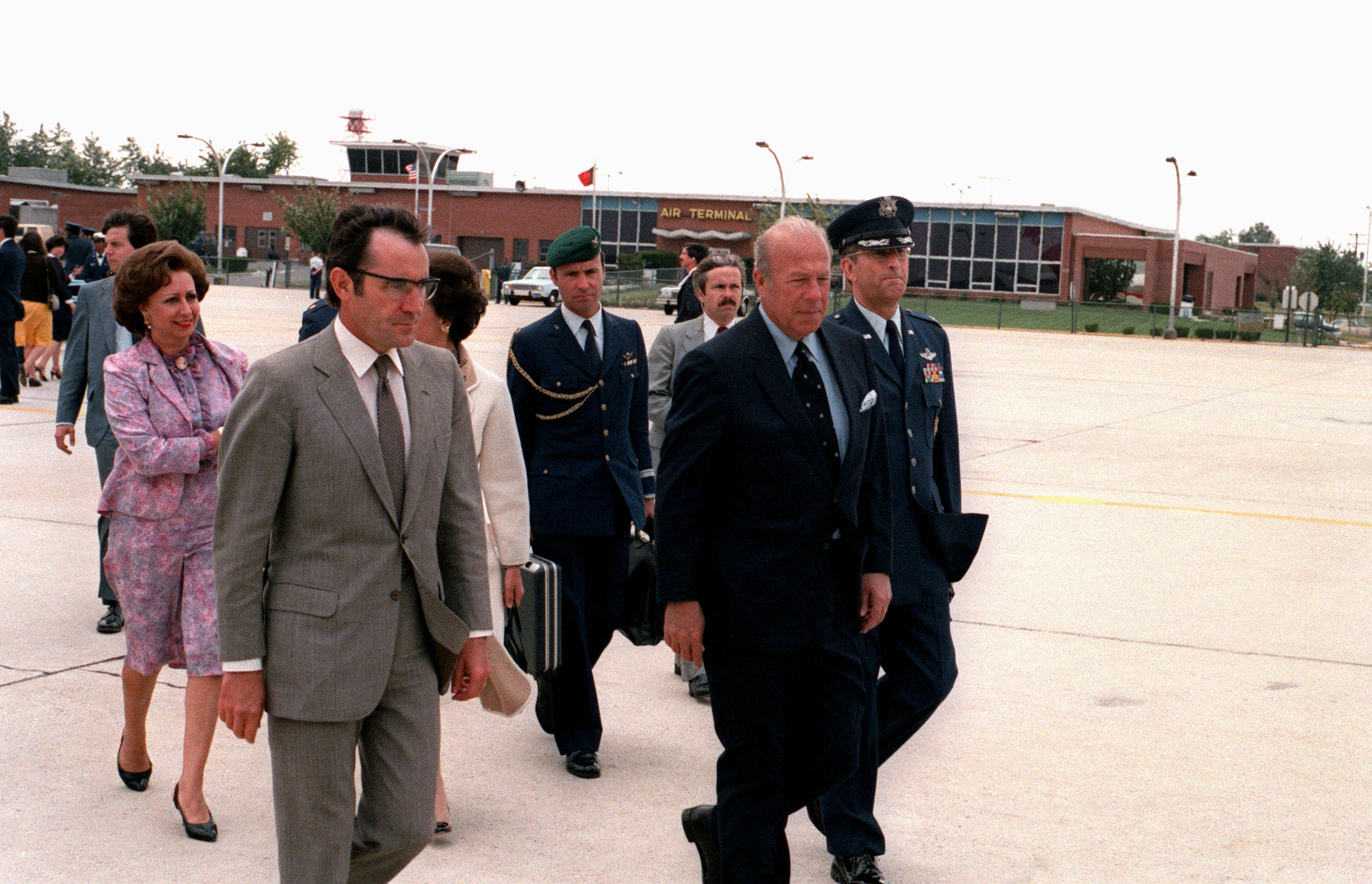
António Ramalho Eanes (left), while president, departs after a state visit to the United States. Secretary of State George Shultz is on the right. (USAF)

He is a member of the Portuguese Council of State, as a former elected president of Portugal.

Eanes is one of the most admired and respected figures in Portuguese public life due to his extreme humility and sense of civic duty. In the words of historian Tom Gallagher, he "had remained a popular figure despite the country's steady drift to the right" and "won the approval of many Portuguese of different persuasions as an honest man who was quite clearly not a member of the political class of Lisbon lawyers or Coimbra University professors which (regardless of the political system in being) had long dominated the country". Eanes once refused the honorary title of Marshal, since he considered the title unnecessary. More recently, in February 2025 he refused a 100,000 euro prize because the Fatherland does not owe anyone anything. Years before Eanes had also refused to receive over one million euro in backpay from his military service. In July of that same year, Eanes suffered a car accident, but was unharmed.

== Honours ==
=== National ===
- Grand Collar of the Military Order of the Tower and Sword (GColTE, 9 March 1986)
- Grand Collar of the Military Order of Aviz (GColA, 10 June 2025)
- Knight of the Military Order of Aviz (CvA, 19 January 1972)
- Grand Collar of the Order of Prince Henry (GColIH, 20 June 2016)
- Grand Collar of the Order of Liberty (GColL, 18 December 2015)
- Grand Cross of the Order of Liberty (GCL, 25 April 2004)

=== Foreign ===
- Algeria: Collar (Athir) of the National Order of Merit (29 May 2005)
- Belgium: Grand Cordon of the Order of Leopold (7 June 1982)
- Brazil:
  - Grand Collar of the Order of the Southern Cross (15 July 1980)
  - Grand Cross of the Order of Military Merit (15 July 1980)
- Bulgaria: Sash of the Order of the Stara Planina (15 July 1980)
- People's Republic of the Congo: Grand Cross of the Order of Merit of the People's Republic of the Congo (16 May 1984)
- Denmark: Knight of the Order of the Elephant (24 January 1985)
- East Timor: Grand Collar of the Order of Timor-Leste (6 August 2012)
- Egypt: Grand Cordon of the Order of the Nile (28 March 1984)
- France: Grand Cross of the National Order of Legion of Honour (5 March 1979)
- Germany: Grand Cross Special Class of the Order of Merit of the Federal Republic of Germany (15 July 1980)
- Greece: Grand Cross of the Order of Honour (7 February 1986)
- Holy See: Collar of the Order of Pope Pius IX (18 July 1980)
- Hungary: First Class with diamonds of the Order of the Flag of the People's Republic of Hungary (15 July 1980)
- Iceland: Grand Cross with Collar of the Order of the Falcon (24 November 1983)
- Italy: Knight Grand Cross of the Order of Merit of the Italian Republic (3 November 1980)
- Luxembourg: Knight of the Order of the Gold Lion of the House of Nassau (2 January 1985)
- Mozambique: First Class of the Order of Friendship and Peace (28 September 1983)
- Norway: Grand Cross with Collar of the Order of St. Olav (3 July 1980)
- Romania: Grand Cross of the Order of the Star of Romania (15 July 1980)
- Sovereign Military Order of Malta: Collar with swords of the Order pro merito Melitensi (29 April 1983)
- Spain:
  - Collar of the Order of Charles III (15 July 1980)
  - Collar of the Order of Isabella the Catholic (15 July 1980)
- United Kingdom:
  - Honorary Knight Grand Cross of the Most Honourable Order of the Bath (14 November 1978)
  - Recipient of the Royal Victorian Chain (25 March 1985)
- Yugoslavia:
  - Great Star of the Order of the Yugoslav Star (17 October 1977)
  - Sash of the Order of the Yugoslav Flag (18 July 1980)
- Zaire: Grand Cordon of the National Order of the Leopard (5 January 1984)

== Family ==
He married at the Palace of Queluz on 28 October 1970 to Maria Manuela Duarte Neto Portugal (b. 29 December 1938), who was one of Portugal's most politically active First Ladies. They had two sons, Manuel António (b. 5 May 1972) and Miguel (b. 20 October 1977).

== Electoral history ==
=== Presidential election, 1976 ===
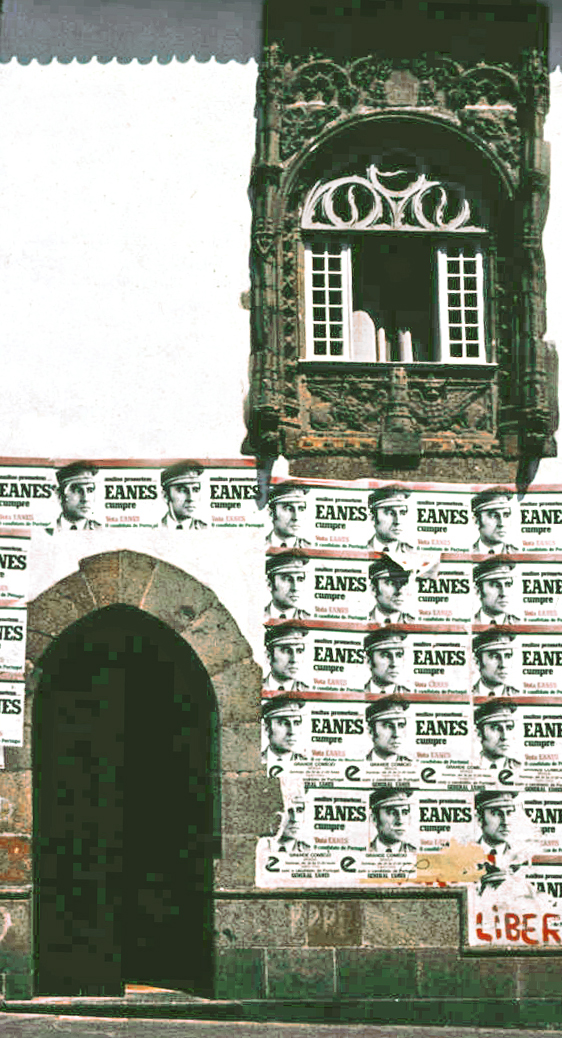
Eanes campaign posters in Braga, 1976.

Ballot: 27 June 1976
Candidate	Votes	%
António Ramalho Eanes	2,967,137	61.6
Otelo Saraiva de Carvalho	792,760	16.5
José Pinheiro de Azevedo	692,147	14.4
Octávio Pato	365,586	7.6
Blank/Invalid ballots	63,495	–
Turnout	4,881,125	75.47
Source: Comissão Nacional de Eleições

=== Presidential election, 1980 ===
Ballot: 7 December 1980
Candidate	Votes	%
António Ramalho Eanes	3,262,520	56.4
António Soares Carneiro	2,325,481	40.2
Otelo Saraiva de Carvalho	85,896	1.5
Carlos Galvão de Melo	48,468	0.8
António Pires Veloso	45,132	0.8
António Aires Rodrigues	12,745	0.2
Blank/Invalid ballots	60,090	–
Turnout	5,840,332	84.39
Source: Comissão Nacional de Eleições

=== PRD leadership election, 1986 ===
Ballot: 29 April 1986
Candidate	Votes	%
António Ramalho Eanes	Voice vote	
Turnout		100.0
Source: Results

=== Legislative election, 1987 ===
Ballot: 19 July 1987
Party	Candidate	Votes	%	Seats	+/−
PSD	Aníbal Cavaco Silva	2,850,784	50.2	148	+60
PS	Vítor Constâncio	1,262,506	22.2	60	+3
CDU	Álvaro Cunhal	689,137	12.1	31	–7
PRD	António Ramalho Eanes	278,561	4.9	7	–38
CDS	Adriano Moreira	251,987	4.4	4	–18
Other parties		219,715	3.9	0	±0
Blank/Invalid ballots		123,668	2.2	–	–
Turnout		5,676,358	71.57	250	±0
Source: Comissão Nacional de Eleições

== Sources ==
- Gallagher, Tom (1983), Portugal: A Twentieth-Century Interpretation, Manchester: Manchester University Press
- Maxwell, Kenneth (1995), The Making of Portuguese Democracy, Cambridge: Cambridge University Press, doi:10.1017/CBO9780511582752, ISBN 978-0-521-46077-4

Political offices
Preceded by Costa Gomes	President of Portugal; 1976–1986	Succeeded by Mário Soares
