= Socialist Party (Portugal) =

Centre-left political party in Portugal

Socialist Party Partido Socialista
- Abbreviation: PS
- President: Carlos César
- Secretary-General: José Luís Carneiro
- Founder: Mário Soares
- Founded: 19 April 1973; 53 years ago in Bad Münstereifel, Germany
- Legalised: 1 February 1975; 51 years ago
- Preceded by: Acção Socialista Portuguesa
- Headquarters: Largo do Rato 2, 1269–143 Lisbon
- Newspaper: Acção Socialista
- Student wing: Estudantes Socialistas
- Youth wing: Socialist Youth
- Women's wing: National Department of the Socialist Women
- Membership (2025): 93 943
- Ideology: Social democracy
- Political position: Centre-left
- National affiliation: Republican and Socialist Front (1980–1982)
- Regional affiliation: PSOM (historical)
- European affiliation: Party of European Socialists
- European Parliament group: Progressive Alliance of Socialists and Democrats
- International affiliation: Progressive Alliance; Socialist International
- Trade union affiliation: General Union of Workers
- Colours: Red (official); Pink (customary)
- Anthem: "A Internacional" ('The Internationale')
- Assembly of the Republic: 58 / 230
- European Parliament: 8 / 21
- Regional Parliaments: 31 / 104
- Local government (Mayors): 127 / 308
- Local government (Parishes): 1,190 / 3,216

Election symbol

Party flag

Website
- ps.pt

The Socialist Party (Portuguese: Partido Socialista [pɐɾˈtiðu susiɐˈliʃtɐ], PS) is a social democratic political party in Portugal. It was founded on 19 April 1973 in the German city of Bad Münstereifel by militants who were at the time with the Portuguese Socialist Action (Portuguese: Acção Socialista Portuguesa). The PS is a member of the Socialist International, Progressive Alliance and Party of European Socialists, and has eight members in the European Parliament within the Progressive Alliance of Socialists and Democrats group during the 10th European Parliament.

The party won the 1976 general election and formed the first constitutional government after the 1974 revolution, with Mário Soares as prime minister. However, the government was unstable and fell in 1978. The PS lost the 1979 election, but returned to power in 1983, forming, with the Social Democratic Party, a Central Bloc coalition. It lasted two years and in 1985, the party was defeated and went back to opposition, remaining there for 10 years and losing the two following general elections. Under António Guterres, the party won the 1995 general election and returned to power, lasting until 2002, upon the resignation of Guterres. The party made a comeback and won a historic absolute majority in the 2005 general election under the leadership of José Sócrates. By 2011, the economic crisis led the party to lose the 2011 snap election and the party returned to the opposition. Despite losing the 2015 election, the party formed an agreement with the Left Bloc and the Unitary Democratic Coalition and managed to appoint António Costa as Prime Minister. Costa remained in office for 9 years, until 2024, and during his term won two elections, the last one, in 2022, with an absolute majority. After Costa's resignation, the party narrowly lost the 2024 election, thus, returning to opposition. The party again lost the 2025 election by a larger margin and even fell to third place in Parliament for first time since the 1974 revolution.

A party of the centre-left, the PS is one of the three major parties in Portuguese politics; its rivals being the Social Democratic Party (PSD), a centre-right, conservative party, and Chega (CH), a far-right, populist party. Elected in June 2025, the incumbent party leader is José Luís Carneiro.

== History ==
=== Portuguese Socialist Action (1964–1973) ===
The Portuguese Socialist Action (ASP) was founded in November 1964, in Geneva, Switzerland, by Mário Soares, Manuel Tito de Morais and Francisco Ramos da Costa. The ASP was founded in exile by several Socialist members as political organizations during Salazar's Estado Novo regime were forbidden. In 1964, Mário Soares was elected leader of the ASP and the core principles and values of the ASP were approved.

Inspired by May 68 events, the Socialist Party (PS) was created at a conference of the Portuguese Socialist Action (ASP) on 19 April 1973, in Bad Münstereifel in West Germany:

Ballot: 19 April 1973
Option	Votes	%
In favour of a party	20	74.1
Against a party	7	25.9
Turnout	27	

The twenty-seven delegates decided to found a party of socialism and political freedom, making an explicit reference to a classless society and with Marxism as a source of principal inspiration. However, seven delegates voted against the idea of creating a party, including Mário Soares' wife Maria Barroso.

=== Mário Soares' leadership (1973–1985) ===
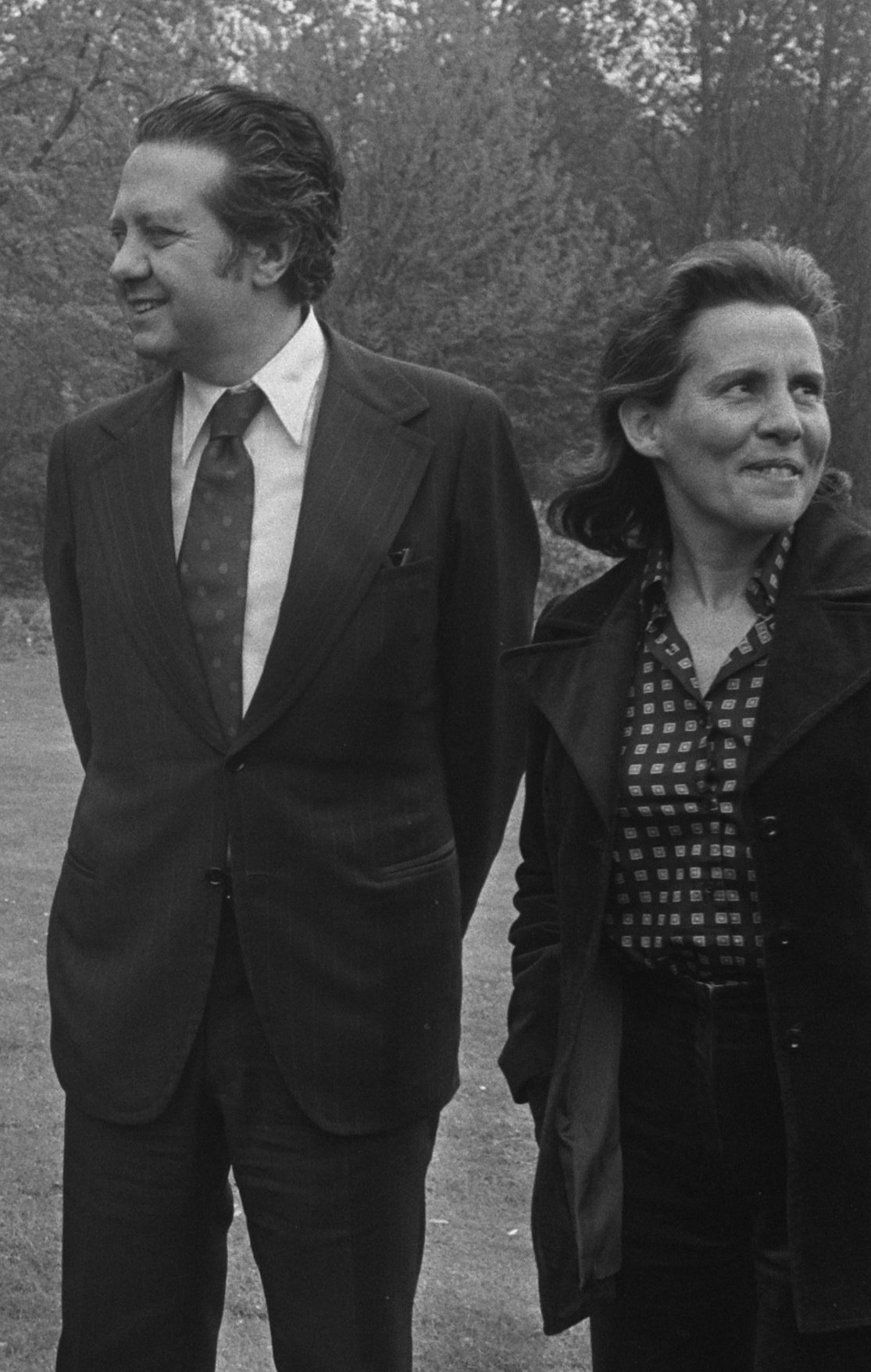
Mário Soares and Maria Barroso in 1974.

On 25 April 1974, the Carnation Revolution brought down the authoritarian regime of the Estado Novo, established in 1933, and democracy was restored. The new Socialist Party was involved in the Provisional governments, with several party figures being a part of the cabinets such as Mário Soares, Francisco Salgado Zenha, Raul Rêgo, António de Almeida Santos, António Lopes Cardoso, Eduardo Pereira, Jorge Campinos and Walter Rosa.

During this time, the PS suffered Trotskyist entryism, with Soares facing serious leadership challenges from this wing of the party, winning the December 1974 election for party leader against Manuel Serra by a 56–44 margin. This would lead to some splits, such as the FSP and POUS, which never succeeded.

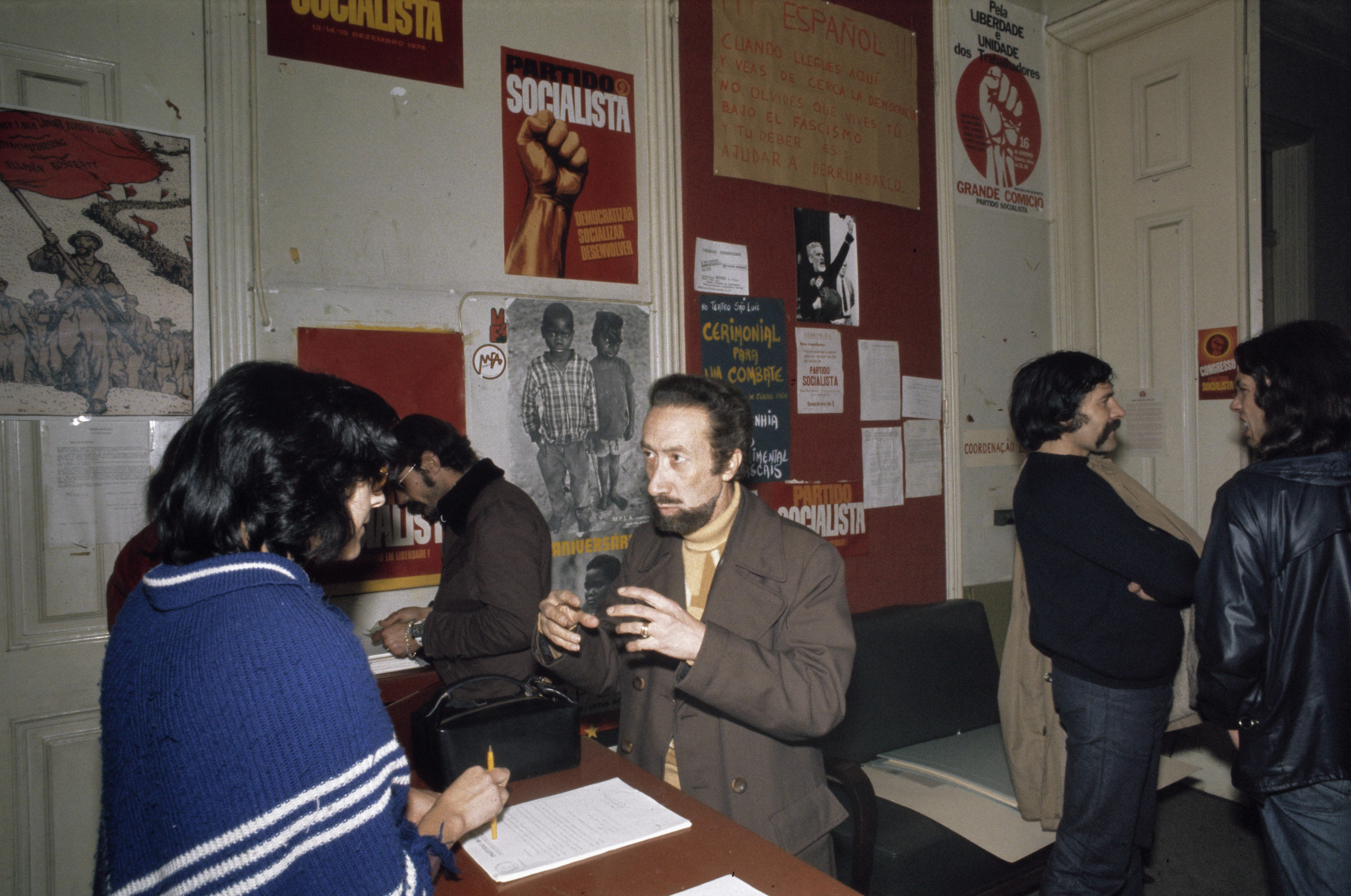
Socialist Party national headquarters in 1975.

After the revolution, elections were called for 25 April 1975 and the PS won the 1975 election for the Constituent Assembly and the 1976 elections for the Assembly of the Republic. Mário Soares became the first Prime Minister under the new 1976 Constitution. He first led a minority government and, after a vote of no confidence in December 1977, the PS formed a coalition government with the Democratic and Social Center (CDS). This cabinet ended up being short-lived as CDS would break with the coalition in July 1978, leading to three presidential initiative governments.

PS ended up losing to the Democratic Alliance (AD) in the 1979 legislative election. Shortly after, in the 1980 election, the PS made an electoral alliance, called the Republican and Socialist Front (FRS), between the Independent Social Democrats (ASDI), led by Sousa Franco, and the Left-wing Union for the Socialist Democracy (UEDS), led by Lopes Cardoso, but this alliance failed to defeat the AD.

In the 1980 presidential election, the party was divided on whether or not to support Ramalho Eanes on his re-election bid. Soares, who distrusted Eanes, ended up suspending his leadership because a significant wing of the party (led by Salgado Zenha) was in favour of supporting the incumbent president. Eanes ended up winning reelection in an election marked by Francisco Sá Carneiro's death.

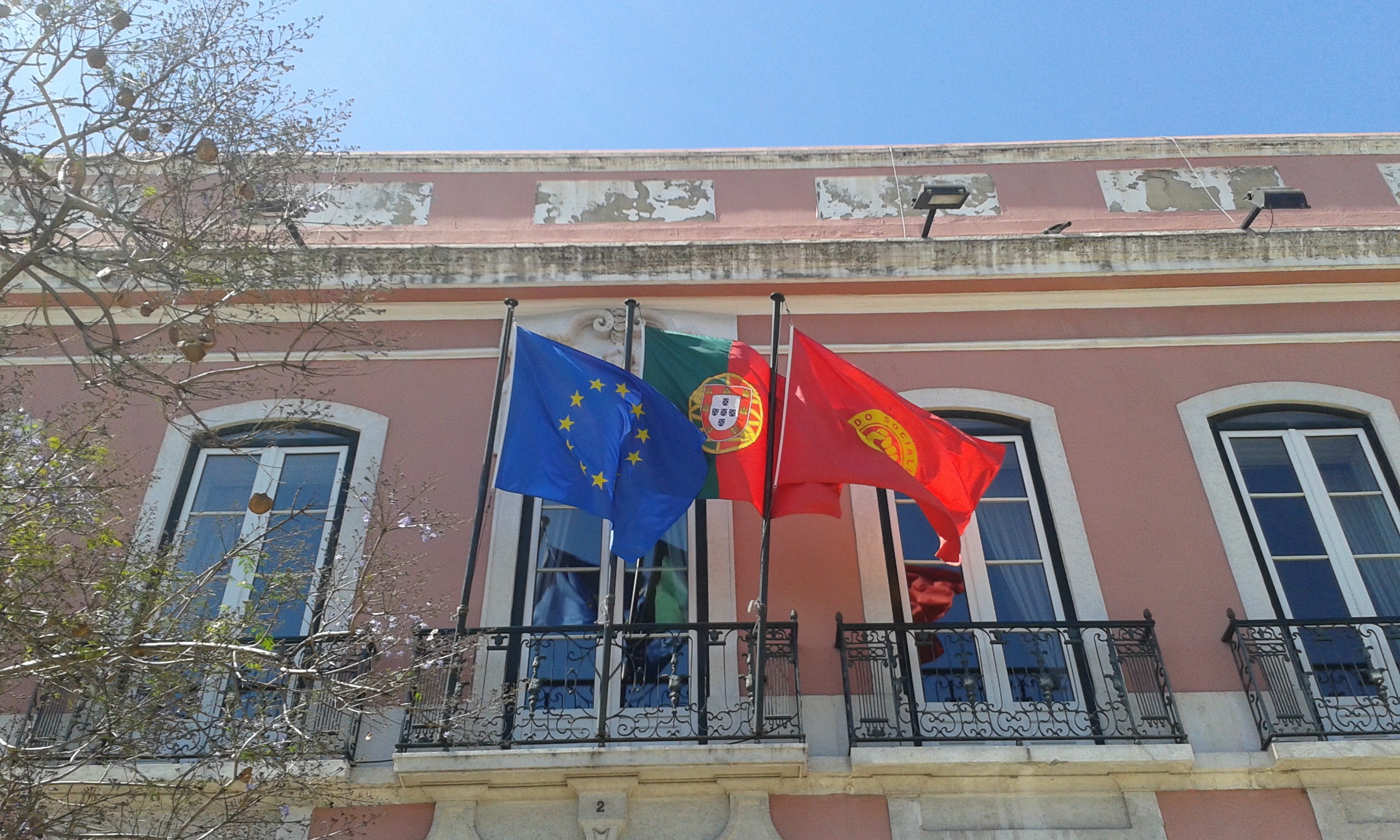
Socialist Party national headquarters in Lisbon.

Soares remained in the party's leadership and won the 1983 legislative election but without an absolute majority, which led to the formation of a grand coalition with the centre-right Social Democratic Party (PSD), creating the Central Bloc. The new government began negotiations for Portugal to enter the European Economic Community (EEC).

In 1985, following the death of PSD leader Carlos Mota Pinto and the election of Aníbal Cavaco Silva as the new leader, the Central Bloc broke down and the PS, who nominated António de Almeida Santos as the party's candidate for Prime Minister, lost the 1985 legislative election in a crushing defeat, after several party members defected to Eanes' Democratic Renewal Party (PRD), winning just 20.8% of the votes and 57 seats.

=== Opposition to Cavaco Silva (1985–1992) ===
As the PS was removed from the government by Cavaco Silva, Mário Soares left the leadership of the party in order to run for the 1986 presidential election. After beginning with about 8% of voting intentions, Soares ended up surpassing former Prime Minister Maria de Lourdes Pintasilgo and his former allied and friend Salgado Zenha (who had the backing of the PRD and the Communist Party), going into the second round with former CDS leader Diogo Freitas do Amaral, after winning 25.4% of the votes. He ended up winning the full support of the left (notably an endorsement from PCP secretary-general Álvaro Cunhal) and defeated Freitas do Amaral with 51.2% of the votes, winning the presidency.

After a long period without any clear leader, Vítor Constâncio, won the party leadership. In April 1987, PS supported a motion of no confidence from the PRD against the PSD minority government, which led to the fall of the government. Constâncio proposed a coalition government with the PRD and with the support of the PCP, but that possibility was rejected by President Mário Soares, who dissolved parliament. In the July 1987 legislative election, despite a slight increase of the PS to the 22.2% of the votes, Cavaco Silva's PSD won its first absolute majority, achieving 50.2% of the votes.

Constâncio ended up leaving the leadership of the party in January 1989, citing the interference from Mário Soares as a reason, being succeeded by Jorge Sampaio as party leader. Sampaio himself was the party's candidate for that years' local elections in Lisbon, forming a coalition with the PCP. Sampaio won the mayorship with 49% of the votes, defeating the PSD/CDS/PPM candidate Marcelo Rebelo de Sousa. After being elected as Mayor, Sampaio ended up splitting his time between the Mayorship and the leadership of the opposition, which ended up being criticized by his internal opponents. This led to another defeat, with PSD winning 50.6% of the votes, while the PS increased its vote share to 29.1%.

After this defeat, António Guterres declared his candidacy for the party leadership against Sampaio. Sampaio ended up withrawing his candidacy before the vote and Guterres won the leadership.

=== PS under António Guterres (1992–2002) ===
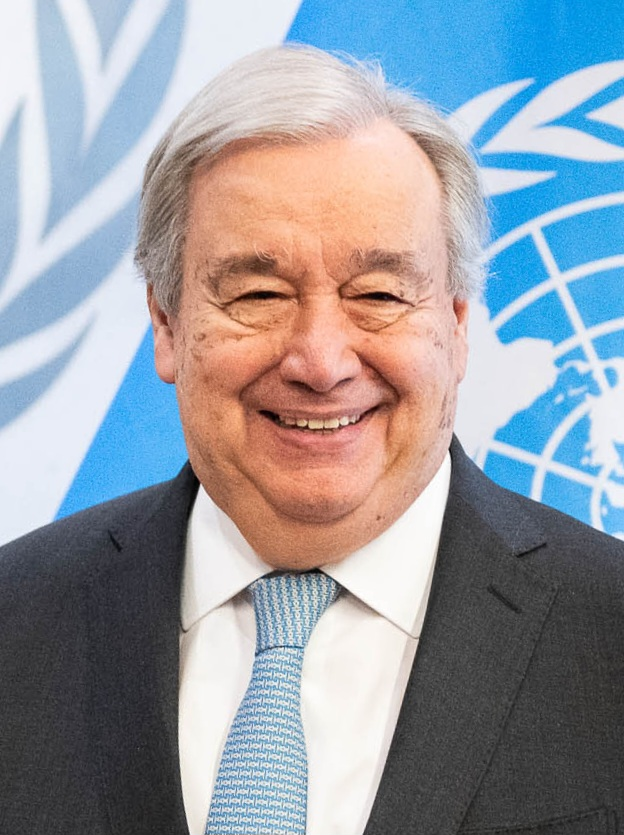
António Guterres, who led the Socialist Party from 1992 until 2002. He was Prime Minister from 1995 to 2002 and Secretary-general of the United Nations from 2016 until the present day.

After ten years in the opposition, the PS won the 1995 legislative election, with 43.8% of the votes and 112 seats, slightly short of a majority. António Guterres became the new Prime Minister, as Jorge Sampaio defeated Cavaco Silva in the 1996 presidential election with 53.9% of the votes. This marked the first time since 1974 that a party held both the Presidency and the government.

In 1996, the PS won its first regional election ever, with Carlos César winning the Azorean election with 45.8% of the votes, forming a minority government with the support of the CDS.

As the country headed into the polls again in 1999, Portugal was enjoying a period of growing economic stability and prestige. Despite that, the PS failed to obtain what would have been a historic absolute majority for the party by only one seat. This led to the party having to negotiate odd coalitions with unlikely partners to approve legislation, with the party relying on a single CDS–PP deputy in order to pass the 2001 and 2002 budgets.

After a massive defeat in the 2001 local elections, with the party losing several important municipalities such as Lisbon, Porto, Sintra and Cascais, Guterres resigned as prime minister. The new Socialist leader, Eduardo Ferro Rodrigues, ended up losing the 2002 legislative election by a small margin to the PSD, who formed a coalition government with the People's Party (CDS–PP).

During this time, it has been argued that the Socialist Party moved towards the centre and adopted the Third Way. In the early 2000s, the party cleaned up its membership database, resulting in a reduction of registered members from 120,000 in 2001 to 77,000 in 2002.

=== Rise and fall of José Sócrates (2002–2011) ===
As the PS returned to the opposition, a child abuse scandal broke, which ended up involving high figures from the party, including the then party leader Ferro Rodrigues.

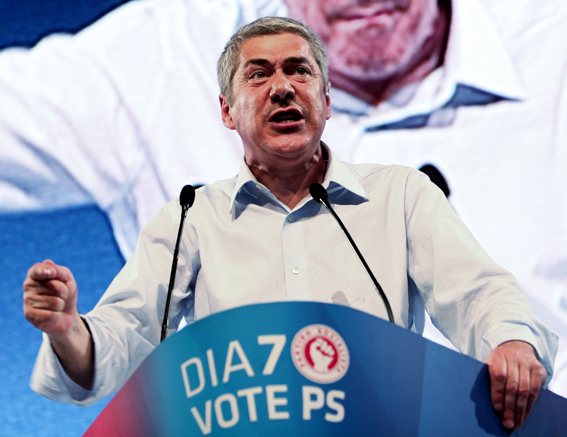
José Sócrates during the campaign for the 2009 European Parliament elections.

In June 2004, the PS won the 2004 European elections by a landslide, and a few weeks later, José Manuel Durão Barroso, leader of the PSD and prime minister, resigned to become President of the European Commission. President Jorge Sampaio decided not to call elections and replaced Durão Barroso with Pedro Santana Lopes, which led to Ferro Rodrigues' resignation as leader of the party. He was replaced in the leadership by former Environment minister José Sócrates.

In December 2004, Jorge Sampaio dissolved Parliament and called fresh elections for February 2005. These elections resulted in a landslide victory for the PS with 45.0% of the votes and 121 seats, winning for the first time since its foundation an absolute majority, with José Sócrates becoming Prime Minister of Portugal.

In 2009, after 4 1/2 years in power, the PS lost the 2009 European Parliament elections to the PSD. However, they won the legislative election held on 27 September 2009, failing to renew the absolute majority they won in the previous general election. During this time, PS introduced and legislated same-sex marriage.

The Eurozone crisis and financial crisis of 2011 hit Portugal very hard, prompting Sócrates' government to impose harsh austerity measures. On 23 March 2011, the entire opposition in Parliament said no to new measures proposed by the government. As a result of this, Sócrates resigned as prime minister and a snap election took place on 5 June 2011. In the elections, the PS suffered a huge setback, with 28.1 percent of the vote, ten points behind the PSD, who formed another coalition government with the CDS–PP. Sócrates resigned as Secretary-general on election night after the PS's worst result since 1987.

=== António José Seguro's leadership (2011–2014) ===
On 23 July 2011, António José Seguro was elected as Sócrates' successor. During his leadership, the PS abstained in the 2012 State Budget, attracting criticism from within the party.

Under the leadership of Seguro, the PS won one of its best results ever in the 2013 local elections, making significant gains over the PSD, and in May 2014 won again the European Parliament elections, winning 31.5% of the votes against almost 28% of the PSD/CDS coalition. However, this latest result was considered quite a disappointment to many PS members and supporters and on 27 May 2014, António Costa, the then-mayor of Lisbon, announced that he would stand for the leadership of the PS. Seguro refused to call a new congress and leadership election and instead called for a primary election, to be held on 28 September, to elect the party's candidate for prime minister in the 2015 legislative election.

Costa, being endorsed by people like Mário Soares, Ana Catarina Mendes and Pedro Nuno Santos, easily defeated Seguro by a 67% to 31% margin, with Seguro stepping out of politics afterwards.

=== António Costa's leadership (2014–2024) ===
In the 2015 legislative elections, the PS polled a disappointing second place, capturing just 32 percent of the votes against the 38.6 percent of the PSD/CDS–PP electoral alliance Portugal Ahead. Despite the victory of the PSD/CDS-PP coalition, the centre-left and left-wing parties achieved a clear majority in the Portuguese parliament. After the second Passos Coelho cabinet fell in parliament, with the approval of a no-confidence motion, the PS forged a confidence and supply agreement with Left Bloc and Unitary Democratic Coalition to support a PS minority government. For the first time in Portuguese democracy, the leader of the second most voted political force became prime minister.

In order to avoid bankruptcy due to mounting debt, in 2017, the party, alongside the PSD, the Portuguese Communist Party, BE and the ecologist party PEV, voted in favour of abolishing party fundraising limits, thereby opening all Portuguese parties to private political donorship, that they are not obligated to disclose. The new proposal was reluctantly approved by the Portuguese president Marcelo Rebelo de Sousa.

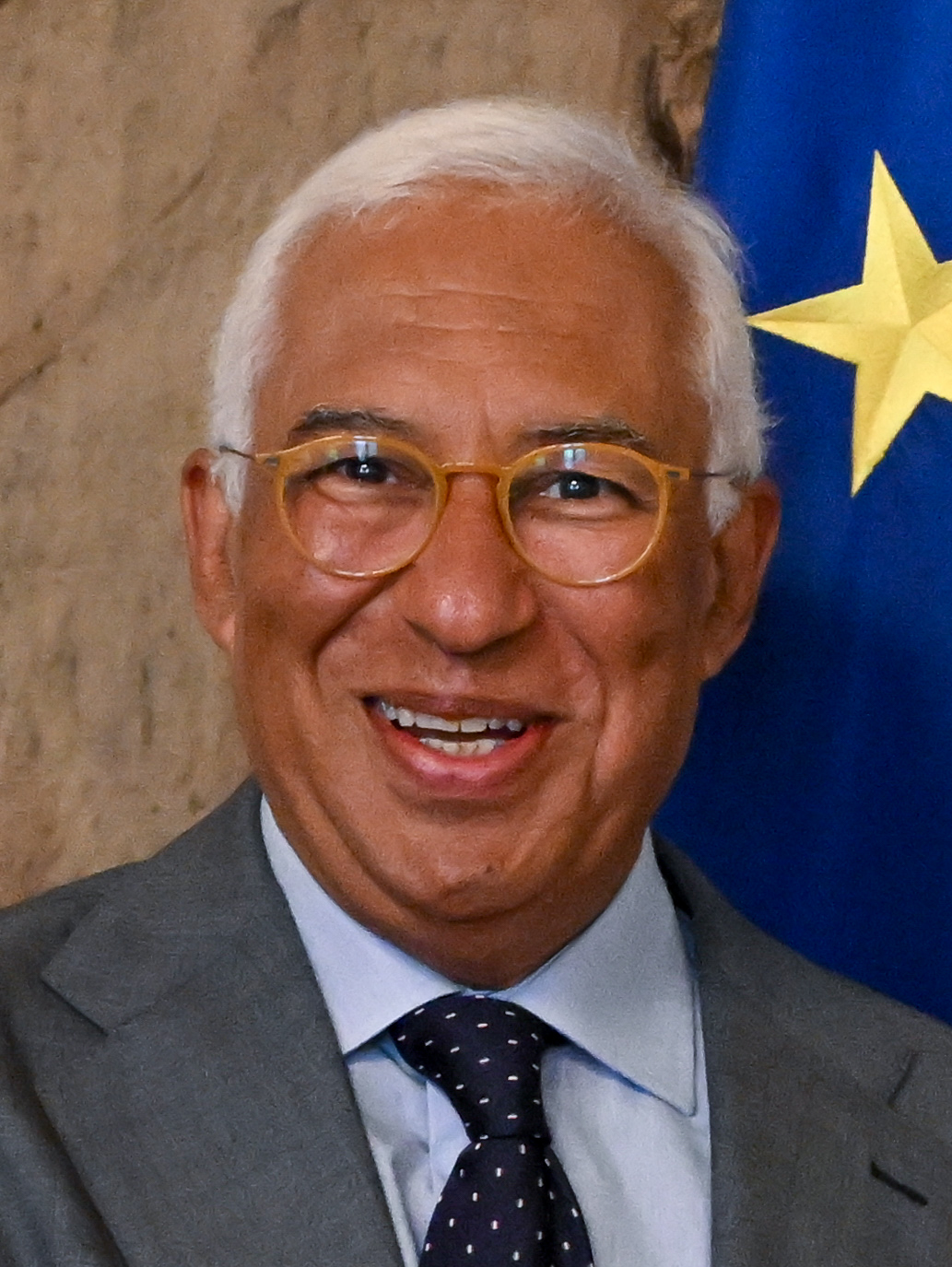
António Costa, Secretary-general of the party from 2014 until 2024 and who is currently the President of the European Council

Costa led a very successful first term as prime minister with a growing economy, low unemployment, and deficit cuts. Although he led a more left-leaning PS, Costa started to shift the party back to the centre in 2018, something that a younger and more left-wing faction, led by minister Pedro Nuno Santos, contested. In the 2019 European elections, the PS won a significant victory by achieving 33.4 percent, against the 22 percent of the PSD. The PS also won the October 2019 general election with 36 percent of the votes, against the 28 percent of the PSD, but by a closer margin than expected. The Second Costa cabinet was sworn in on 26 October 2019.

In October 2020, the PS lost power in the Azores region after the Socialists lost their majority in the region's 2020 October elections. The PS only got 39 percent of the votes, a drop of 7 pp, and 25 seats. The right-wing parties PSD, CDS, PPM, CHEGA, and IL won a majority of one seat over the whole left wing, and a few weeks after the election, they forged a deal that led the PSD to government. As of 2021, the PS is now in opposition in both autonomous regions of the country.

For the 2021 Portuguese presidential election, Costa endorsed the incumbent Marcelo Rebelo de Sousa, something that made some party members unsatisfied. Former PS MEP Ana Gomes, a critic of Costa and a member of the left faction of the party, ran for the presidency, declaring herself the candidate of democratic socialism and progressivism, stating that she has been disappointed with the leadership of the party for not having an official candidate. With the support of the left faction of the party and some more moderate members worried about corruption, Gomes finished in a disappointing second place behind de Sousa, who had many endorsements of party leaders like Lisbon's Mayor Fernando Medina, Eduardo Ferro Rodrigues, and Carlos César.

The party suffered a setback in the 2021 local elections by losing several cities to the PSD. However, the main defeat was the loss of Lisbon to the PSD candidate, Carlos Moedas, who defeated Fernando Medina by a narrow 34 to 33 percent margin. After the local elections, tensions between the PS and its left-wing allies, BE and CDU, led to the rejection of the 2022 budget which forced the calling of a snap election for January 2022. Despite polls predicting a close race between the PS and PSD, the Socialists won a surprise absolute majority, only the second in their history, with 41 percent of the votes against the 29 percent of the PSD, and winning 120 (52%) of the 230 seats in the Portuguese parliament.

In November 2023, António Costa resigned as prime minister and party leader following the Operation Influencer investigation, which investigates suspected corruption activities in the awarding of contracts for the lithium and hydrogen businesses. Following Costa's decision, an early election was called for 10 March 2024. A leadership election was called for 15 and 16 December 2023, which was won by Pedro Nuno Santos with almost 61 percent of the votes.

=== Return to the opposition (2024–present) ===
On the 10 March 2024 election, the Socialist Party was narrowly defeated by the Democratic Alliance (AD), headed by the Social Democratic Party, losing 42 seats and gathering 28 percent of the votes. Three months later, in the 2024 European Parliament elections, the Socialist Party narrowly defeated the AD coalition, by a 32 to 31 percent margin. A new election was called for May 2025, after a vote of confidence in the AD minority government was rejected, following the revelations of the Spinumviva case. The party suffered one of its worst results ever in the election, gathering just less than 23 percent of the votes and 58 seats, falling to third place in terms of seats by being surpassed by the far-right Chega party and losing the status of leader of the opposition. Pedro Nuno Santos resigned and a leadership election was opened. After being the only candidate to submit a candidacy, José Luís Carneiro became party leader in late June 2025.

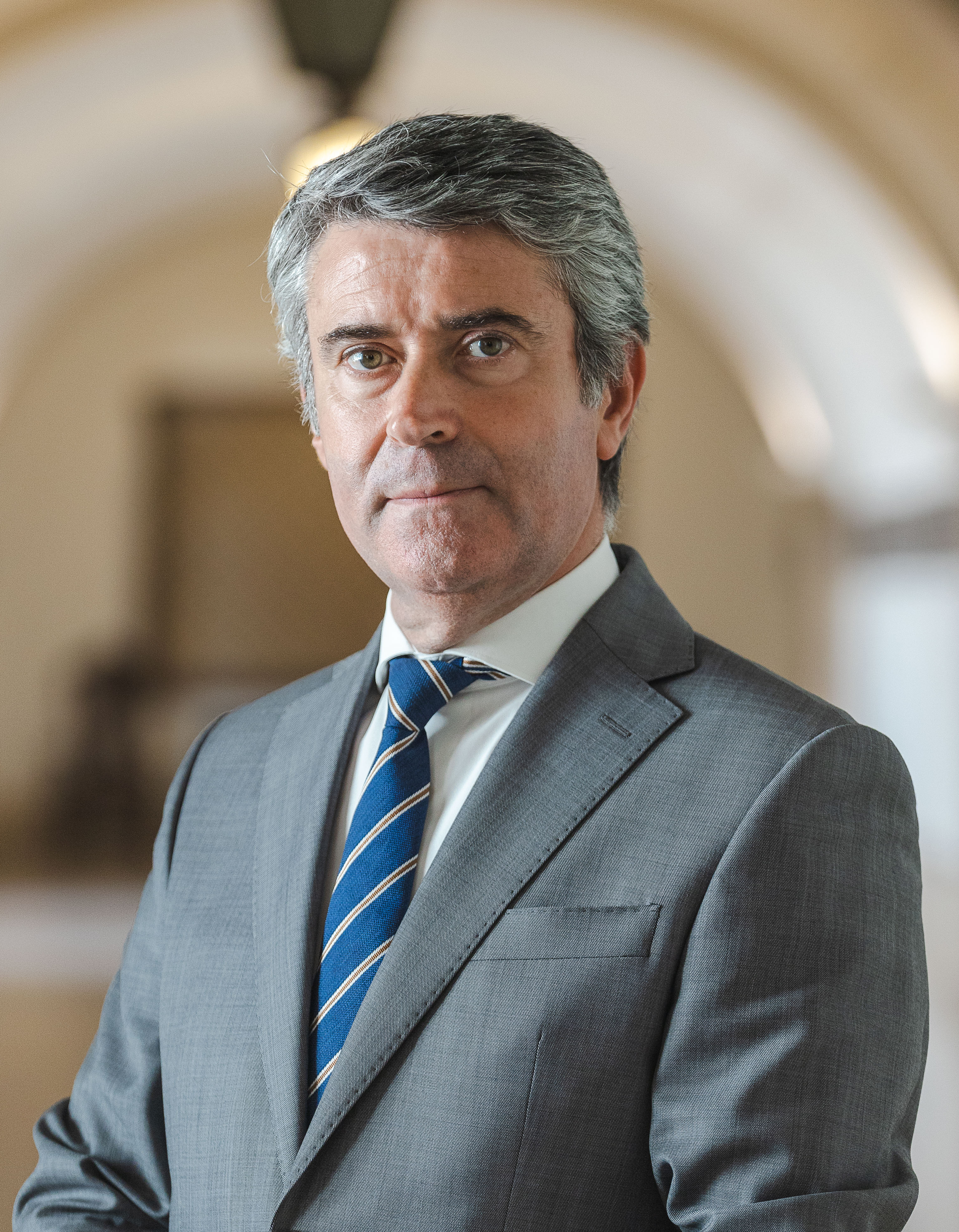
José Luís Carneiro, Secretary-General since 2025.

The party entered the 2025 local elections, with the ambition to retain the National Association of Portuguese Municipalities (ANMP) and secure the highest number of district capitals, and major cities: specifically Lisbon, Porto, Braga, Sintra, Vila Nova de Gaia, Setúbal and Coimbra. High-profile party figures, such as the former ministers Alexandra Leitão (Lisbon), Manuel Pizarro (Porto), Ana Mendes Godinho (Sintra) and Ana Abrunhosa (Coimbra) were chosen as candidates to spearhead this effort.

Following the results of the previous legislative elections, many anticipated severe losses and an unprecedent electoral erosion, exacerbated by the term-limit rule that forced 54 out of the 148 sitting Socialist mayors elected in 2021 to step down, creating openings in several municipalities. Despite this pessimistic outlook, the Socialists won 127 municipalities, but were still surpassed by the PSD, being 5 short of the minimum needed to retain the presidency of ANMP. The results were mixed for the party, in one hand Alexandra Leitão lost Lisbon by almost 8%, the candidates in the biggest cities were also defeated and the party lost strongholds like Aljezur, Baião, Cabeceiras de Basto, Condeixa-a-Nova, Guimarães, Lourinhã, Melgaço, Soure and Torres Vedras; on the other hand the PS made significant gains in the interior of the country, notably flipping Viseu for the first time ever. In response to the results, José Luís Carneiro declared that “the Socialists are back,” signaling party optimism despite not winning the major urban centers.

In the 2026 presidential election, the party's supported candidate, former secretary-general António José Seguro (2011–2014), polled first in the first round with 31% of the votes and faced far-right candidate André Ventura in a runoff. Seguro was easily elected President with 67% of the votes, against the 33% of Ventura.

== Ideology and factions ==
The PS is a mainstream centre-left social democratic party that supports Keynesianism, a mixed economy, Europeanism, and progressivism. Like many mainstream social democratic parties, it has previously adopted a Third Way outlook.

According to the party statutes, no autonomous organization of tendencies or adoption of political denominations by any internal group is allowed. Existing informal internal factions range from democratic socialism to social liberalism and centrism. Party members like former leader Pedro Nuno Santos, MP Pedro Delgado Alves, former ministers Duarte Cordeiro and João Galamba were connoted with the party's left faction, being referred to as the Young Turks of the Socialist Party for their opposition to the leadership of António José Seguro, on the other hand figures like Francisco Assis, Sérgio Sousa Pinto and Álvaro Beleza are connoted with the party's right-wing.

Historically, during its first years, the party has also had far-left factions. The most notable figures of this factions include the Marxist Manuel Serra, who opposed Mário Soares leadership from the left and won 44% of the votes against him, leaving the party and creating the People's Socialist Front afterwards; as well as the MPs Carmelinda Pereira and António Aires Rodrigues, who were the most notable examples of a "Trotskyist infiltration on the party", it is noted that this faction represented 25% of the delegates elected to the socialist national congress of 1976.

== Election results ==
=== Assembly of the Republic ===
Seat share in the Portuguese legislative elections

Election	Leader	Votes	%	Seats	+/-	Government
1975	Mário Soares	2,162,972	37.87 (#1)	116 / 250	New	Constituent assembly
1976	Mário Soares	1,912,921	34.89 (#1)	107 / 263	▼9	Minority (Note: Minority government (1976–1978); Coalition government with the CDS between January and August 1978; Opposition (1978–1979).)
1976	Mário Soares	1,912,921	34.89 (#1)	107 / 263	▼9	Coalition
1976	Mário Soares	1,912,921	34.89 (#1)	107 / 263	▼9	Opposition
1979	Mário Soares	1,642,136	27.33 (#2)	74 / 250	▼33	Opposition
1980	Mário Soares	Republican and Socialist Front		66 / 250	▼8	Opposition
1983	Mário Soares	2,061,309	36.11 (#1)	94 / 250	▲28	Coalition (Note: Central Bloc government (PS-PSD) (Jun 1983 – Nov 1985))
1985	António de Almeida Santos	1,204,321	20.77 (#2)	57 / 250	▼37	Opposition
1987	Vítor Constâncio	1,262,506	22.24 (#2)	60 / 250	▲3	Opposition
1991	Jorge Sampaio	1,670,758	29.13 (#2)	72 / 230	▲12	Opposition
1995	António Guterres	2,583,755	43.76 (#1)	112 / 230	▲40	Minority
1999	António Guterres	2,385,922	44.06 (#1)	115 / 230	▲3	Minority
2002	Eduardo Ferro Rodrigues	2,068,584	37.80 (#2)	96 / 230	▼19	Opposition
2005	José Sócrates	2,588,312	45.03 (#1)	121 / 230	▲25	Majority
2009	José Sócrates	2,077,238	36.56 (#1)	97 / 230	▼24	Minority
2011	José Sócrates	1,566,347	28.05 (#2)	74 / 230	▼23	Opposition
2015	António Costa	1,747,685	32.32 (#2)	86 / 230	▲12	Opposition
2015	António Costa	1,747,685	32.32 (#2)	86 / 230	▲12	Minority (Note: Opposition (Oct–Nov 2015); Confidence and supply government between the PS and BE–PCP–PEV (Nov 2015 – Oct 2019))
2019	António Costa	1,903,687	36.35 (#1)	108 / 230	▲22	Minority
2022	António Costa	2,302,601	41.38 (#1)	120 / 230	▲12	Majority
2024	Pedro Nuno Santos	1,812,443	27.98 (#2)	78 / 230	▼42	Opposition
2025	Pedro Nuno Santos	1,442,546	22.83 (#2)	58 / 230	▼20	Opposition

=== Presidential ===
Election	Candidate	First round		Second round		Result
Election	Candidate	Votes	%	Votes	%	Result
1976	Supported António Ramalho Eanes					Won ✓
1980	Supported António Ramalho Eanes					Won ✓
1986	Mário Soares	1,443,683	25.43 (#2)	3,010,756	51.18 (#1)	Won ✓
1991	Mário Soares	3,459,521	70.35 (#1)			Won ✓
1996	Jorge Sampaio	3,035,056	53.91 (#1)			Won ✓
2001	Jorge Sampaio	2,401,015	55.55 (#1)			Won ✓
2006	Mário Soares	785,355	14.31 (#3)			Lost ✗
2011	Manuel Alegre	831,838	19.74 (#2)			Lost ✗
2016	No candidate (Note: Former party president Maria de Belém Roseira ran but failed to receive the party's official support, which recommend voting for her or António Sampaio da Nóvoa.)					
2021	No candidate (Note: Former MEP Ana Gomes ran but failed to receive the party's support.)					
2026	António José Seguro	1,755,563	31.11 (#1)	3,502,613	66.84 (#1)	Won ✓

=== European Parliament ===
Election	Leader	Votes	%	Seats	+/-	EP Group
1987	Maria de Lourdes Pintasilgo	1,267,672	22.48 (#2)	6 / 24	New	SOC
1989	João Cravinho	1,184,380	28.54 (#2)	7 / 24	▲1	SOC
1994	António Vitorino	1,061,560	34.87 (#1)	10 / 25	▲3	PES
1999	Mário Soares	1,493,146	43.07 (#1)	12 / 25	▲2	PES
2004	António Costa	1,516,001	44.52 (#1)	12 / 24	0	PES
2009	Vital Moreira	946,818	26.53 (#2)	7 / 22	▼5	S&D
2014	Francisco Assis	1,033,158	31.49 (#1)	8 / 21	▲1	S&D
2019	Pedro Marques	1,104,694	33.40 (#1)	9 / 21	▲1	S&D
2024	Marta Temido	1,268,915	32.11 (#1)	8 / 21	▼1	S&D

=== Local ===
Results of PS and PS-led coalitions.

Election	Leader	Votes	%	Mayors	+/-	Councillors	+/-	Assemblies	+/-	Parishes	+/-	Parish Assemblies	+/-
1976	Mário Soares	1,389,980	33.33 (#1)	115 / 304	New	691 / 1,906	New	1,701 / 5,130	New	1,104 / 4,035	New	8,364 / 26,268	New
1979	Mário Soares	1,345,048	27.67 (#2)	60 / 305	▼55	523 / 1,937	▼168	2,748 / 9,926	▲1,047	813 / 4,042	▼291	10,948 / 41,199	▲2,584
1982	Mário Soares	1,632,825	31.82 (#2)	84 / 305	▲24	642 / 1,953	▲119	3,268 / 10,001	▲520	1,025 / 4,050	▲212	12,848 / 42,199	▲1,900
1985	António Macedo (ad interim)	1,330,388	27.41 (#2)	79 / 305	▼5	571 / 1,981	▼71	1,817 / 6,730	▼1,451	1,001 / 4,138	▼24	9,044 / 32,016	▼3,804
1989	Jorge Sampaio	1,814,099	36.67 (#1)	120 / 305	▲41	752 / 1,997	▲181	2,514 / 6,763	▲697	1,408 / 4,207	▲407	11,776 / 33,130	▲2,732
1993	António Guterres	2,172,753	40.17 (#1)	127 / 305	▲7	819 / 2,011	▲67	2,715 / 6,792	▲201	1,603 / 4,220	▲195	12,962 / 33,544	▲1,186
1997	António Guterres	2,206,315	41.15 (#1)	128 / 305	▲1	879 / 2,021	▲60	2,917 / 6,807	▲202	1,732 / 4,240	▲129	13,626 / 34,008	▲664
2001	António Guterres	1,948,520	37.09 (#2)	113 / 308	▼15	850 / 2,044	▼29	2,785 / 6,876	▼132	1,560 / 4,129	▼172	13,616 / 34,569	▼10
2005	José Sócrates	1,933,041	35.87 (#2)	109 / 308	▼4	852 / 2,046	▲2	2,794 / 6,885	▲9	1,518 / 4,125	▼42	13,460 / 34,498	▼156
2009	José Sócrates	2,084,382	37.67 (#2)	132 / 308	▲23	921 / 2,078	▲68	2,855 / 6,946	▲61	1,577 / 4,107	▲59	13,736 / 34,672	▲276
2013	António José Seguro	1,835,288	36.72 (#1)	150 / 308	▲18	929 / 2,086	▲8	2,676 / 6,487	▼179	1,287 / 3,085	▼290	10,898 / 27,167	▼2,838
2017	António Costa	2,003,893	38.74 (#1)	160 / 308	▲10	963 / 2,074	▲34	2,759 / 6,461	▲83	1,302 / 3,083	▲15	10,727 / 27,005	▼171
2021	António Costa	1,854,960	37.09 (#1)	148 / 308	▼12	909 / 2,064	▼54	2,647 / 6,448	▼112	1,266 / 3,066	▼36	10,656 / 26,790	▼71
2025	José Luís Carneiro	1,828,554	33.15 (#2)	127 / 308	▼21	807 / 2,058	▼102	2,361 / 6,464	▼286	1,173 / 3,221	▼93	10,003 / 27,997	▼653

=== Regional Assemblies ===
Region	Election	Leader	Votes	%	Seats	+/-	Government
Azores	2024	Vasco Cordeiro	41,538	35.92 (#2)	23 / 57	▼2	Opposition
Madeira	2025	Paulo Cafôfo	22,351	15.63 (#3)	8 / 47	▼3	Opposition

== List of lead party figures ==
=== Secretaries-General ===
- Mário Soares: 19 April 1973 – 29 June 1986
- António de Almeida Santos (ad interim): 13 June 1985 – 13 November 1985
- António Macedo (ad interim): 13 November 1985 – 29 June 1986
- Vítor Constâncio: 29 June 1986 – 16 January 1989
- Jorge Sampaio: 16 January 1989 – 23 February 1992
- António Guterres: 23 February 1992 – 19 January 2002
- Eduardo Ferro Rodrigues: 19 January 2002 – 27 September 2004
- José Sócrates: 27 September 2004 – 23 July 2011
- António José Seguro: 23 July 2011 – 28 September 2014
- Maria de Belém Roseira (ad interim): 28 September 2014 – 22 November 2014
- António Costa: 22 November 2014 – 7 January 2024
- Pedro Nuno Santos: 7 January 2024 – 24 May 2025
- Carlos César (ad interim): 24 May 2025 – 28 June 2025
- José Luís Carneiro: 28 June 2025 – present

=== Graphical timeline ===
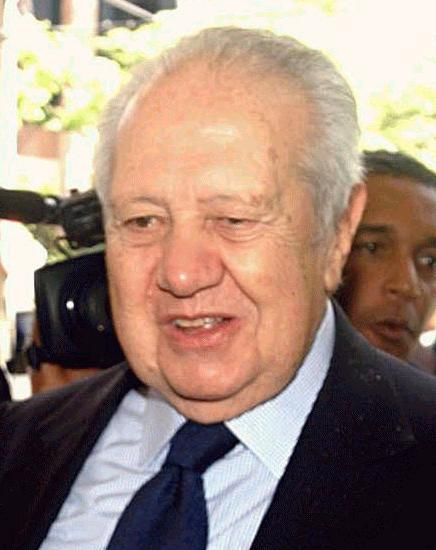
Mário Soares, founder, Prime Minister (1976–1978, 1983–1985) and President of the Republic (1986–1996).

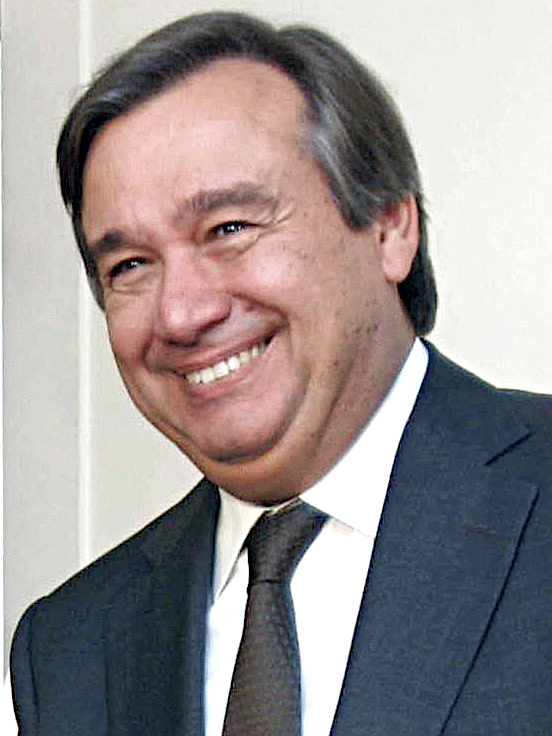
António Guterres, Prime Minister (1995–2002) and Secretary-General of the United Nations (since 2017).

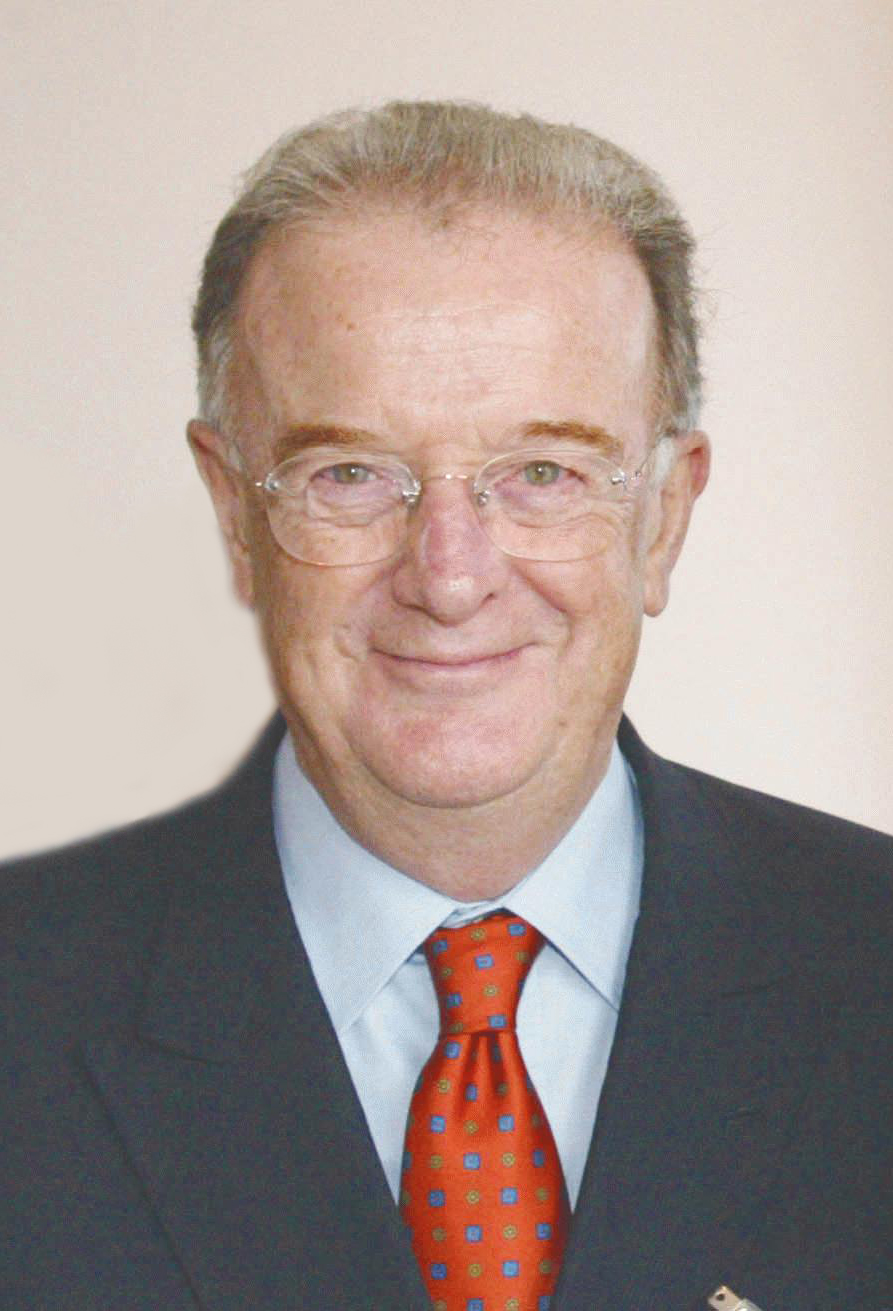
Jorge Sampaio, party's Secretary-General (1989–1992) and President of the Republic (1996–2006).

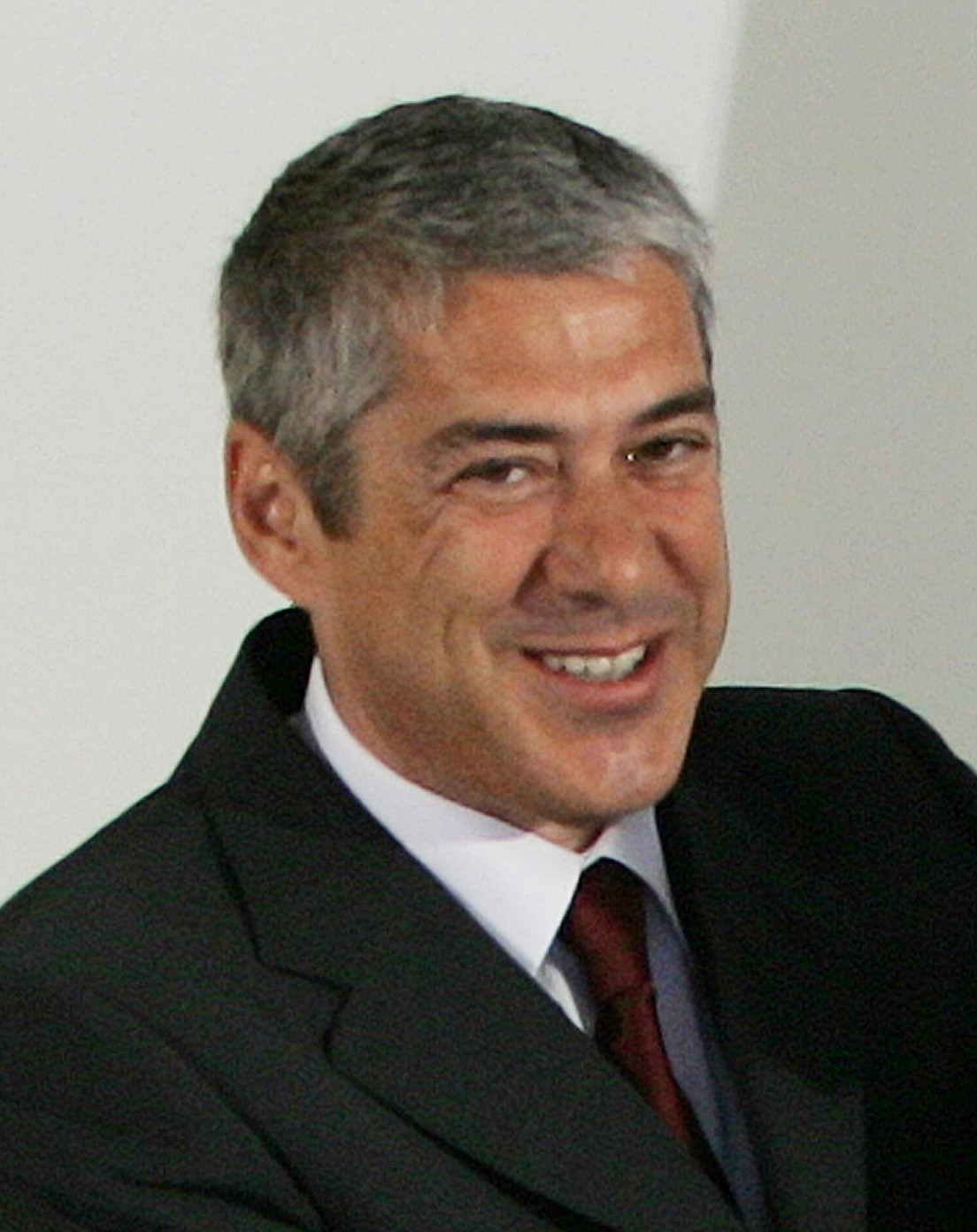
José Sócrates, party's Secretary-General (2004–2011) and Prime Minister (2005–2011).

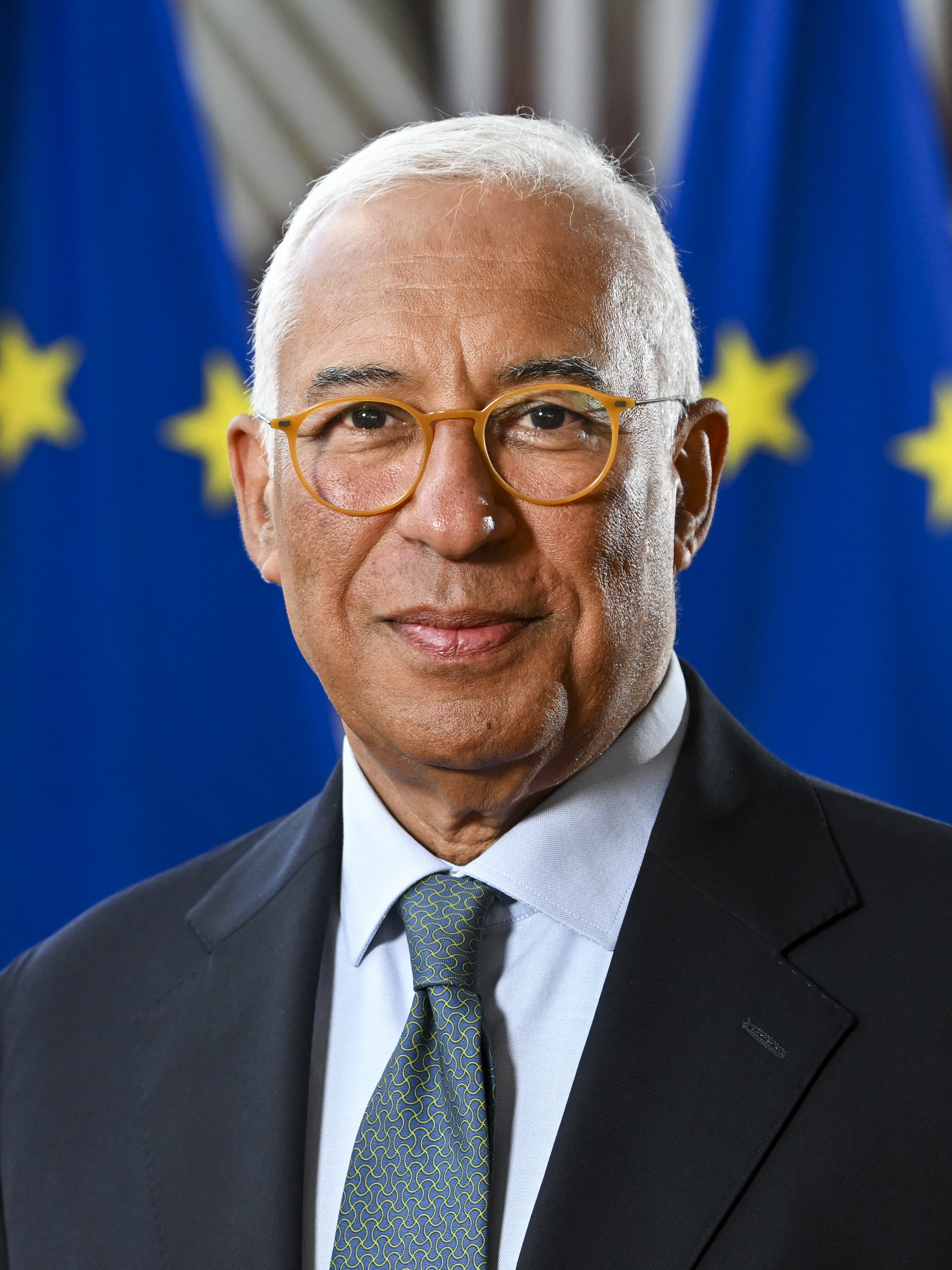
António Costa, Prime Minister (2015–2024) and President of the European Council (since 2024).

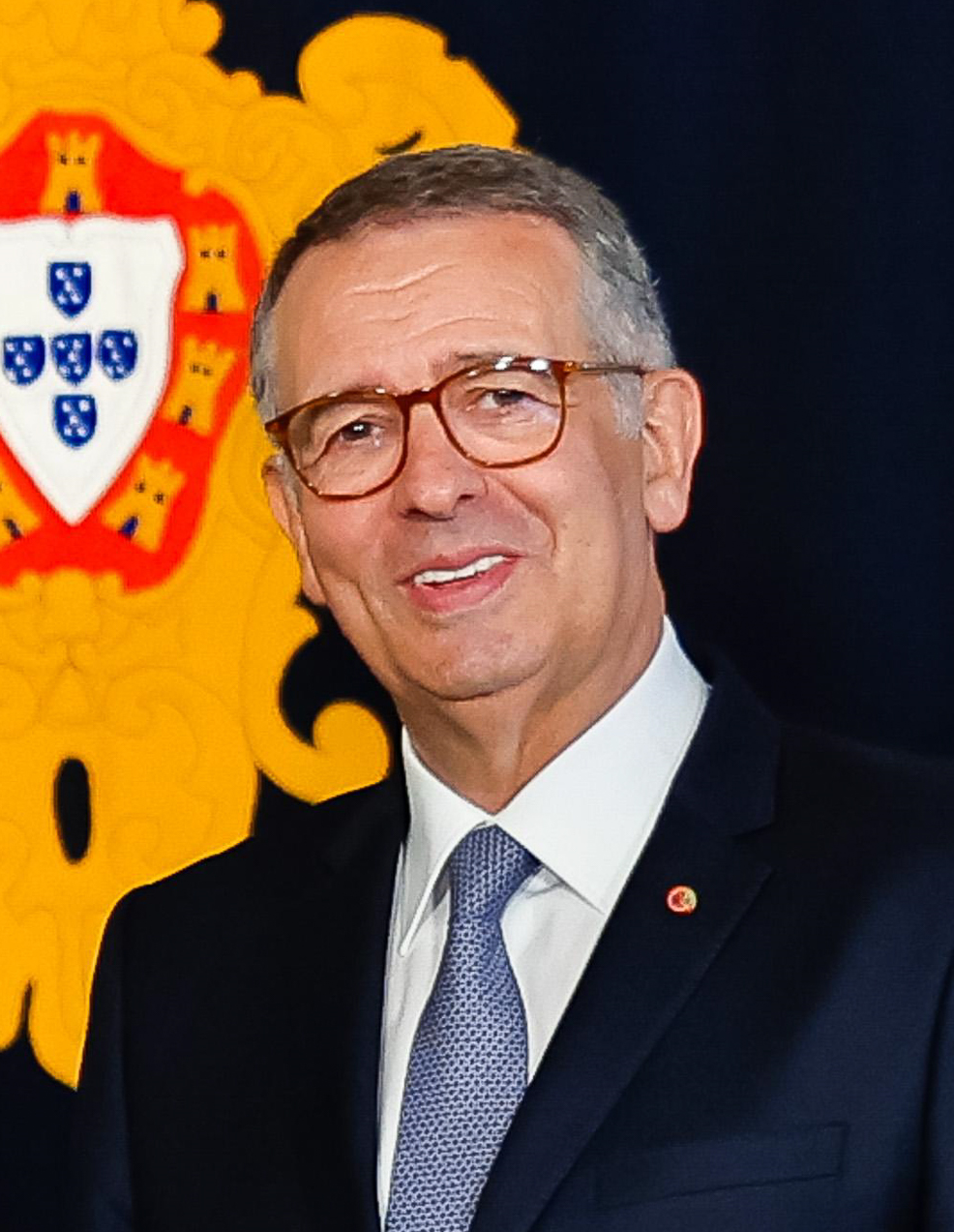
António José Seguro, party's Secretary-General (2011–2014) and President of the Republic (since 2026).

=== Party presidents ===
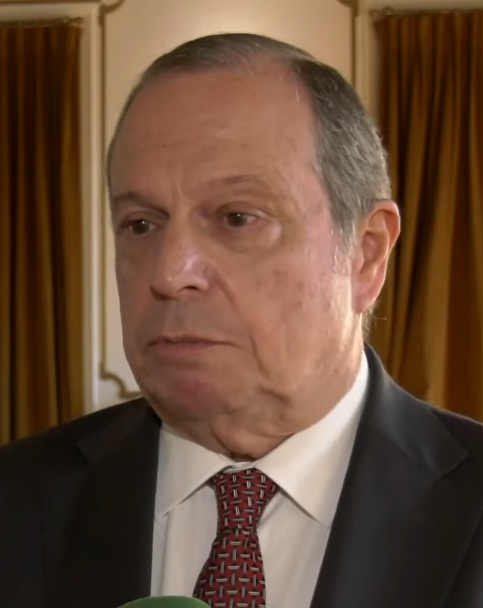
Carlos César, President of the Government of the Azores from 1996 to 2012 and the current party president.

- António Macedo: 19 April 1973 – 29 June 1986
- Manuel Tito de Morais: 29 June 1986 – 14 January 1989
- João Ferraz de Abreu: 14 January 1989 – 21 February 1992
- António de Almeida Santos: 21 February 1992 – 9 September 2011
- Maria de Belém Roseira: 9 September 2011 – 29 November 2014
- Carlos César: 29 November 2014 – present

=== Honorary Party presidents ===
- António Macedo: 1986 – 1989
- Manuel Tito de Morais: 1989 – 1999
- Fernando Valle: 1999 – 2004
- António de Almeida Santos: 2011 – 2016
- António Arnaut: 2016 – 2018
- Manuel Alegre: 2024 – present

=== Parliamentary Leaders ===
- António Lopes Cardoso (Beja): 1975–1976
- Salgado Zenha (Porto): 1976–1983
- Walter Rosa (Lisbon): 1983–1985
- José Luís Nunes (Porto): 1985–1986
- João Ferraz de Abreu (Aveiro): 1986–1987
- Jorge Sampaio (Lisbon): 1986–1988
- António Guterres (Castelo Branco): 1988–1991
- Jaime Gama (Lisbon): 1991–1994
- António de Almeida Santos (Porto): 1992–1993
- Jorge Lacão (Santarém): 1995–1996
- Francisco Assis (Porto) (1st time): 1997–2002
- António Costa (Leiria): 2002–2003
- António José Seguro (Lisbon): 2004–2005
- Alberto Martins (Porto) (1st time): 2005–2009
- Francisco Assis (Porto) (2nd time): 2009–2011
- Maria de Belém Roseira (Lisbon): 2011
- Carlos Zorrinho (Évora): 2011–2013
- Alberto Martins (Porto) (2nd time): 2013–2014
- Eduardo Ferro Rodrigues (Lisbon): 2014–2015
- Carlos César (Azores): 2015–2019
- Ana Catarina Mendes (Setúbal): 2019–2022
- Eurico Brilhante Dias (Leiria) (1st time): 2022–2024
- Alexandra Leitão (Santarém): 2024 – 2025
- Pedro Delgado Alves (Coimbra): 2025
- Eurico Brilhante Dias (Leiria) (2nd time): 2025–present

=== Prime Ministers ===
- Mário Soares: 23 July 1976 – 28 August 1978; 9 June 1983 – 6 November 1985
- António Guterres: 28 October 1995 – 6 April 2002
- José Sócrates: 12 March 2005 – 21 June 2011
- António Costa: 26 November 2015 – 2 April 2024

=== Presidents of the Republic ===
- Mário Soares: 9 March 1986 – 9 March 1996
- Jorge Sampaio: 9 March 1996 – 9 March 2006
- António José Seguro: 9 March 2026 – present

=== Presidents of the Assembly ===
- Henrique de Barros: 3 June 1975 – 2 April 1976
- Vasco da Gama Fernandes: 29 July 1976 – 29 October 1978
- Teófilo Carvalho dos Santos: 30 October 1978 – 7 January 1980
- Manuel Tito de Morais: 8 June 1983 – 24 October 1984
- António de Almeida Santos: 31 October 1995 – 4 April 2002
- Jaime Gama: 16 March 2005 – 21 June 2011
- Eduardo Ferro Rodrigues: 23 October 2015 – 29 March 2022
- Augusto Santos Silva: 29 March 2022 – 25 March 2024

=== Presidents of the Regional Government of the Azores ===
- Carlos César: 9 November 1996 – 6 November 2012
- Vasco Cordeiro: 6 November 2012 – 24 November 2020

== See also ==
- Politics of Portugal
- Socialist Party
