= Carmelinda Pereira =

Portuguese Trotskyist politician

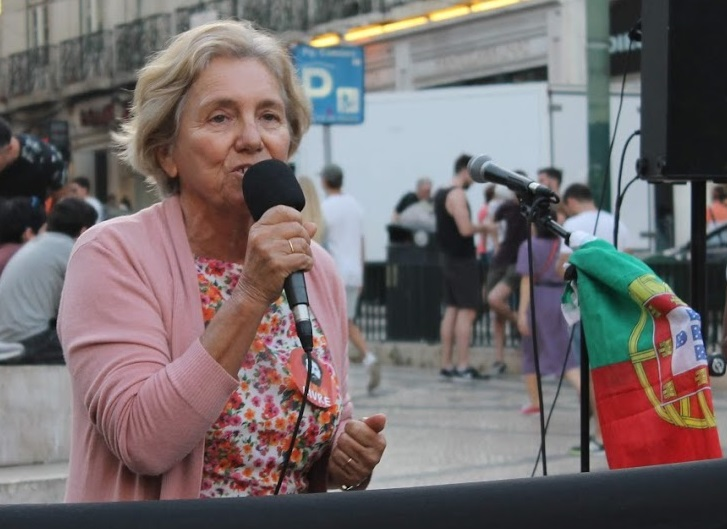

Member of the Portuguese Assembly of the Republic
- In office 3 June 1975 – 1979
- Parliamentary group: Portuguese Socialist Party (PS)

Personal details
- Born: Carmelinda Maria dos Santos Pereira; 7 August 1948 (age 77) Torres Novas, Portugal
- Party: POUS (1979–2020)
- Other party: Socialist Party (1974–1977)

Carmelinda Pereira (born 1948) is a retired teacher and politician from Portugal who represented the Portuguese Socialist Party (PS) in the Portuguese Assembly of the Republic before later becoming the founder of a small Trotskyist party.

== Early life ==
Carmelinda Maria dos Santos Pereira was born to a poor family in a small village near Torres Novas in Portugal on 7 August 1948. She was the eldest of five children. At the age of 13 her family moved to Torres Novas so that she and her siblings could continue their education. She obtained qualifications as a teacher and started her teaching career at a small village school near Santarém, teaching 48 boys. There, she came close to being arrested by Portugal's secret police when some parents complained about her teaching methods. She then moved to a new school in Cascais. Pereira then attended the Higher Institute of Applied Psychology (ISPA) in the Portuguese capital, Lisbon, from which she was among a group of 70 expelled in her third year for political activities. After the Carnation Revolution in April 1974, which overthrew the authoritarian Estado Novo regime, she returned to ISPA but never completed the course because her political activities took up all of her time. It was not until 1999–2001, that she completed her training, at the Escola Superior de Educação, in Lisbon, which allowed her to obtain a qualification in Educational Communication and Information Management - School Libraries.

== Political activities ==
Pereira was a militant member of the Portuguese Socialist Party (PS). She represented the PS in the Constituent Assembly of Portugal (1975-1976) and in the first Assembly of the Republic from 1976 to 1979. However, in 1977 she had a political disagreement with the leader of the PS, Mario Soares, who was then the Portuguese Prime Minister, and was expelled from the PS, becoming for a time an independent deputy. The PS was planning for Portugal to join the European Economic Community (EEC) but Pereira considered that EEC rules conflicted with her aim of mobilizing the working class and voted against the government's budget. She returned to teaching in 1979 in Algés near Lisbon. Her school, known as EB1, was one in which 30% of the students were either Roma or of African origin and many had disabilities. She played a significant role in the work of the school in creating a multicultural and inclusive environment.

In 1979 she founded, together with Aires Rodrigues, the Workers Party of Socialist Unity (POUS), which was a small Trotskyist party. She was the leader of the party's list in national and European elections until 2014 but the party never succeeded in obtaining more than 0.33% of the vote and never obtained a seat in the Portuguese parliament. In the 2009 European parliamentary elections, the party argued for the break up of the European Union. She tried to become a candidate in Portugal's presidential elections but never succeeded in obtaining sufficient nominations. The party was wound up in 2019.
