= Workers' Party of Socialist Unity =

Workers Party of Socialist Unity Partido Operário de Unidade Socialista
- Leader: Collective leadership (Central Committee)
- Founded: 1979
- Dissolved: 2020
- Split from: Socialist Party
- Headquarters: Lisbon, Portugal
- Ideology: Communism; Marxism; Trotskyism
- Political position: Far-left
- International affiliation: Fourth International (lambertiste)
- Colours: Red

Website
- https://pous4.no.sapo.pt/

Workers Party of Socialist Unity (Portuguese: Partido Operário de Unidade Socialista, pronounced [pɐɾˈtiðwɔpɨˈɾaɾju ðɨ uniˈðaðɨ susjɐˈliʃtɐ], POUS) was a small Trotskyist former political party in Portugal, founded by Aires Rodrigues and Carmelinda Pereira in 1979 after a split from the Portuguese Socialist Party. It is a member of the Fourth International led by Pierre Lambert. It disbanded itself as a registered political party on November 14, 2020. It will continue to exist as a political association.
