= António Aires Rodrigues =

Portuguese politician

Personal details
- Born: António Jorge Oliveira Aires Rodrigues; 21 August 1945 (age 81) Alfarelos, Soure, Portugal
- Education: University of Lisbon Law School; Sá da Bandeira High School
- Occupation: Political, revolutionary

António Jorge Oliveira Aires Rodrigues is a Portuguese militant worker and politician born in Alfarelos on 21 August 1945.

During May 68, he lived in exile in Paris, where he was a worker at the Renault factory, having taken part in the uprising and the occupation of the House of Portugal together with Fernando Pereira Marques and Vasco de Castro.

A member of the PS party in 1974, he was a member of the Constituent Assembly elected by Leiria.

In 1977, breaking with Mário Soares's Political Commission, he was expelled from the PS party, becoming an independent legislator.

He founded the Workers' Party of Socialist Unity (POUS) with Carmelinda Pereira, of trotskyist and lambertist inspiration.

In the 1980 Portuguese presidential election he was the POUS party candidate for President of Portugal, obtaining a total of 12,745 votes.
