= Carlos Galvão de Melo =

Portuguese military officer (1921–2008)

Deputy of the Constituent Assembly
- In office 1976 – 2 April 1976

Member of the National Salvation Junta
- In office 25 April 1974 – 16 May 1974

Personal details
- Born: 4 August 1921 Buarcos, Portugal
- Died: 20 March 2008 (aged 86) Alcabideche, Portugal
- Resting place: Mangualde
- Party: CDS – People's Party (1976 - ?)
- Spouse: Maria João Vieira das Neves (m. 1926) Sybille Schön (m. 1925–2007)
- Children: 6
- Known for: Conservative Revolutionary

Military service
- Allegiance: Portugal
- Branch/service: Portuguese Air Force
- Rank: General

Carlos Galvão de Melo (4 August 1921 – 20 March 2008) was a Portuguese military officer from the Portuguese Air Force.

== Life ==
Galvão de Melo was the eldest of nine children of António Augusto Ferreira de Melo, a merchant based in Mozambique, and wife Cecília Rosa Teles de Noronha Galvão. He joined the Portuguese Air Force in 1942 and trained in the United Kingdom and France. Between 1951 and 1954 he was posted at the NATO joint command headquarters, while between 1954 and 1957 he was posted in Goa (then under Portuguese control) to supervise the construction of Dabolim Air Port. Subsequently, he commanded the Fifteenth Squadron 'Reyes', based in Porto (1957–1962), and the Eleventh Bomber Regiment based in Angola (1962–1966). Later he was Military Attache to South Africa from 1966 to 1970, and served (1970–1973) as Military Attache to Brazil. In 1973 he became Commander of the Second Home Front Division.

When on 25 April 1974 the Carnation Revolution broke out in Portugal, deposing Marcelo Caetano and overthrowing the Estado Novo ("New State"), Galvão de Melo joined the National Salvation Junta that took power. Nevertheless, he soon became known as one of the most conservative members of the Junta. Often seen as a far-right politician, in 1980 he stood as a presidential candidate, but on that occasion he obtained less than 1% of the total popular vote. Fourteen years later, he attracted controversy because of his quoted newspaper remarks which defended the 1975 Indonesian annexation of East Timor.

Galvão de Melo was married twice, firstly to Maria João Vieira das Neves (on 24 June 1926) and secondly to Sybille Schön (16 December 1925 - 8 January 2007) (divorced Mrs. Stürken), without issue. From his first marriage he had six children.
