= 2nd Legislature of the Third Portuguese Republic =

←	1st Legislature	3rd Legislature	→

Overview
- Legislative body: Assembly of the Republic
- Meeting place: Palace of Saint Benedict
- Term: 13 November 1980 – 30 May 1983
- Election: 5 October 1980
- Government: VI Constitutional Government; VII Constitutional Government; VIII Constitutional Government
- Website: parlamento.pt

Deputies
- Members: 250
- President: Leonardo Ribeiro de Almeida (PPD/PSD) (1980–1981); Francisco de Oliveira Dias (CDS) (1981–1982); Leonardo Ribeiro de Almeida (PPD/PSD) (1982–1983)
- First Vice-President: Nuno Rodrigues dos Santos (PPD/PSD) (1980–1981); Amândio de Azevedo (PPD/PSD) (1981–1983)
- Second Vice-President: António Arnault (PS) (1980–1981); Manuel Tito de Morais (PS) (1981–1983)
- Third Vice-President: António Martins Canaverde (CDS)
- Fourth Vice-President: José Vitoriano (PCP)

The 2nd Legislature of the Third Portuguese Republic (Portuguese: II Legislatura da Terceira República Portuguesa) ran from 13 November 1980 to 30 May 1983. The composition of the Assembly of the Republic, the legislative body of Portugal, was determined by the results of the 1980 legislative election, held on 5 October 1980.

Following a disappointing result of the Democratic Alliance (AD) in the 1982 local elections, Prime Minister Francisco Pinto Balsemão resigned, citing the election results and disagreements with the PPD/PSD coalition partner, the CDS. The Social Democrats proposed several candidates for Prime Minister to President António Ramalho Eanes, but Eanes rejected them and dissolved the Assembly, calling an election for 25 April 1983.

== Election ==
The 3rd Portuguese legislative election was held on 5 October 1980. In the election, the Democratic Alliance (AD), a coalition composed by the Social Democratic Party (PPD/PSD), the Democratic and Social Center (CDS) and the People's Monarchist Party (PPM) won a majority of the seats and the three parties formed a majority coalition government.

Party	Assembly of the Republic			
Party	Votes	%	Seats	+/−
AD	2,868,076	47.59	134	+6
FRS	1,673,279	27.76	74	±0
APU	1,009,505	16.75	41	–6
UDP	83,204	1.38	1	±0
Other/blank/invalid	392,361	6.50	0	±0
Total	6,026,395	100.00	250	±0

== Composition (1980–1983) ==
Party	Parliamentary group leader	Elected	
Party	Parliamentary group leader	Seats	%
PPD/PSD	Pedro Roseta (Castelo Branco) (1980–1981); Afonso Moura Guedes (Lisbon) (1981–1982); Manuel Pereira (Coimbra) (1982); Vítor Crespo (Leiria) (1982–1983)	82	32.8
PS	Francisco Salgado Zenha (Porto)	66	26.4
CDS	Narana Coissoró (Lisbon)	46	18.4
PCP	Carlos Brito (Faro)	39	15.6
PPM	Augusto Ferreira do Amaral (Lisbon)	6	2.4
UEDS	António Lopes Cardoso (Lisbon)	4	1.6
ASDI	António Sousa Franco (Lisbon)	4	1.6
MDP/CDE	José Tengarrinha (Lisbon)	2	0.8
UDP	Mário Tomé (Lisbon)	1	0.4
Total		250	100.0

== Election for President of the Assembly of the Republic ==
To be elected, a candidate needs to reach a minimum of 126 votes. For the first session of the legislature, two candidates were on the ballot, Teófilo Carvalho dos Santos, from the Socialist Party, and the incumbent Leonardo Ribeiro de Almeida, from the Social Democratic Party who was re-elected:

Election of the President of the Assembly of the Republic
1st Ballot →	18 November 1980	
Required majority →	126 out of 250	
Leonardo Ribeiro de Almeida (PPD/PSD)	124 / 250	check
Teófilo Carvalho dos Santos (PS)	102 / 250	X mark
Blank ballots	2 / 250	
Invalid ballots	3 / 250	
Absentees	19 / 250	

A year later, in October 1981, another ballot was called to elect a new President of the Assembly. There were once again two candidates, Francisco de Oliveira Dias, from the Democratic and Social Center, and Teófilo Carvalho dos Santos, from the Socialist Party. In the first ballot, no one was elected:

Election of the President of the Assembly of the Republic
1st Ballot →	20 October 1981	
Required majority →	126 out of 250	
Teófilo Carvalho dos Santos (PS)	98 / 250	X mark
Francisco de Oliveira Dias (CDS)	97 / 250	X mark
Blank ballots	24 / 250	
Invalid ballots	0 / 250	
Absentees	31 / 250	

In the second ballot, Francisco de Oliveira Dias managed to be elected, achieving a majority:

Election of the President of the Assembly of the Republic
2nd Ballot →	22 October 1981	
Required majority →	126 out of 250	
Francisco de Oliveira Dias (CDS)	128 / 250	check
Teófilo Carvalho dos Santos (PS)	108 / 250	X mark
Blank ballots	2 / 250	
Invalid ballots	2 / 250	
Absentees	10 / 250	

Once again, another year later, in October 1982, another election was held where the Socialist Party nominated Teófilo Carvalho dos Santos and the Social Democratic Party nominated Leonardo Ribeiro de Almeida. No candidate was able to be elected for the first 3 ballots:

Election of the President of the Assembly of the Republic
1st Ballot →	21 October 1982	
Required majority →	126 out of 250	
Teófilo Carvalho dos Santos (PS)	109 / 250	X mark
Leonardo Ribeiro de Almeida (PPD/PSD)	84 / 250	X mark
Blank ballots	38 / 250	
Invalid ballots	3 / 250	
Absentees	16 / 250	

Election of the President of the Assembly of the Republic
2nd Ballot →	21 October 1982	
Required majority →	126 out of 250	
Teófilo Carvalho dos Santos (PS)	108 / 250	X mark
Leonardo Ribeiro de Almeida (PPD/PSD)	86 / 250	X mark
Blank ballots	36 / 250	
Invalid ballots	3 / 250	
Absentees	17 / 250	

Election of the President of the Assembly of the Republic
3rd Ballot →	3 November 1982	
Required majority →	126 out of 250	
Leonardo Ribeiro de Almeida (PPD/PSD)	108 / 250	X mark
Teófilo Carvalho dos Santos (PS)	101 / 250	X mark
Blank ballots	7 / 250	
Invalid ballots	1 / 250	
Absentees	33 / 250	

Only at the 4th attempt did Leonardo Ribeiro de Almeida managed to be elected, due to the lack of people present to vote.

Election of the President of the Assembly of the Republic
4th Ballot →	3 November 1982	
Required majority →	Majority	
Leonardo Ribeiro de Almeida (PPD/PSD)	115 / 250	check
Teófilo Carvalho dos Santos (PS)	102 / 250	X mark
Blank ballots	5 / 250	
Invalid ballots	1 / 250	
Absentees	27 / 250	
