= 1st Legislature of the Third Portuguese Republic =

←	Constituent	2nd Legislature	→

Overview
- Legislative body: Assembly of the Republic
- Meeting place: Palace of Saint Benedict
- Term: 3 June 1976 – 12 November 1980
- Election: 25 April 1976; 2 December 1979
- Government: I Constitutional Government; II Constitutional Government; III Constitutional Government; IV Constitutional Government; V Constitutional Government; VI Constitutional Government
- Website: parlamento.pt

Deputies (1976–1979)
- Members: 263
- President: Vasco da Gama Fernandes (PS) (1976–1978); Teófilo Carvalho dos Santos (PS) (1978–1979)
- First Vice-President: António Arnault (PS)
- Second Vice-President: Nuno Rodrigues dos Santos (PPD)
- Third Vice-President: António Martins Canaverde (CDS)
- Fourth Vice-President: José Vitoriano (PCP)

Deputies (1979–1980)
- Members: 250
- President: Leonardo Ribeiro de Almeida (PPD/PSD)
- First Vice-President: Nuno Rodrigues dos Santos (PPD/PSD)
- Second Vice-President: António Arnault (PS)
- Third Vice-President: José Vitoriano (PCP)
- Fourth Vice-President: António Martins Canaverde (CDS)

The 1st Legislature of the Third Portuguese Republic (Portuguese: I Legislatura da Terceira República Portuguesa) ran from 3 June 1976 to 12 November 1980. The composition of the Assembly of the Republic, the legislative body of Portugal, was determined by the results of the 1976 legislative election, held on 25 April 1976.

This was the only legislature where the composition changed mid-term due to another election, when the 1979 legislative election, held on 2 December 1979, was called after a period of governmental instability, with the resignation of Mário Soares government in 1978, plus the fall of two Presidential appointed Prime Ministers also in 1978 and 1979. President António Ramalho Eanes dissolved the Assembly in September 1979 and called an election for 2 December 1979. Due to the decree that approved the Constitution, which stipulated that the first legislature had a fixed date of completion on 14 October 1980, another election had to be held at end of the legislature in 1980.

== Election ==
The 1st Portuguese legislative election was held on 25 April 1976. In the election, the Socialist Party (PS) won the most seats and formed a minority government. Between January and August 1978, the PS formed a majority coalition government with the Democratic and Social Center (CDS).

Party	Assembly of the Republic			
Party	Votes	%	Seats	+/−
PS	1,912,921	34.89	107	–9
PPD	1,335,381	24.35	73	–8
CDS	876,007	15.98	42	+26
PCP	788,830	14.39	40	+10
UDP	91,690	1.67	1	±0
Other/blank/invalid	478,632	8.73	0	–6
Total	5,483,461	100.00	263	+13

The 2nd Portuguese legislative election was held on 2 December 1979. In the election, the Democratic Alliance (AD), a coalition composed by the Social Democratic Party (PPD/PSD), the Democratic and Social Center (CDS) and the People's Monarchist Party (PPM) won a majority of the seats and the three parties formed a majority coalition government.

Party	Assembly of the Republic			
Party	Votes	%	Seats	+/−
AD	2,719,208	45.26	128	+13
PS	1,642,136	27.33	74	–33
APU	1,129,322	18.80	47	+7
UDP	130,842	2.18	1	±0
Other/blank/invalid	385,945	6.43	0	±0
Total	6,007,453	100.00	250	–13

== Composition ==
=== 1976–1979 ===
Party	Parliamentary group leader	Elected 1976		Before 1979	
Party	Parliamentary group leader	Seats	%	Seats	%
PS	Francisco Salgado Zenha (Porto)	107	40.7	102	38.8
PPD	Francisco Sá Carneiro (Porto) (1976); Afonso Moura Guedes (Lisbon) (1976–1977); António Barbosa de Melo (Coimbra) (1977–1978); Joaquim Magalhães Mota (Lisbon) (1978); José Menéres Pimentel (Lisbon) (1978–1979); Francisco Sá Carneiro (Porto) (1979–1980)	73	27.7	36	13.7
CDS	Adelino Amaro da Costa (Porto) (1976–1978); Narana Coissoró (Lisbon) (1978–1980)	42	16.0	41	15.6
PCP	Carlos Brito (Faro)	40	15.2	40	15.2
UDP	Acácio Barreiros (Lisbon)	1	0.4	1	0.4
ASDI	António Sousa Franco (Lisbon)	0	0.0	37	14.0
Independent	Carmelinda Pereira (Lisbon); António Aires Rodrigues (Leiria); José Justiniano Pinto (Setúbal); António Lopes Cardoso (Beja); Reinaldo Rodrigues (Aveiro); Carlos Galvão de Melo (Viseu)	0	0.0	6	2.3
Total		263	100.0	263	100.0

==== Changes ====
- In January 1977, Carmelinda Pereira and Aires Rodrigues were expelled from the Socialist Party.
- In March 1977, Carlos Galvão de Melo left the Democratic and Social Center caucus.
- In November 1977, António Lopes Cardoso, José Justiniano Pinto and Reinaldo Rodrigues left the Socialist Party due to disagreements with Mário Soares' government.
- In April 1979, 32 deputies from the Social Democratic Party left the party and formed the Independent Social Democratic Action, following disagreements with Francisco Sá Carneiro's leadership, including his opposition to negotiate with PS and his lack of support to President Ramalho Eanes.

=== 1979–1980 ===
Party	Parliamentary group leader	Elected 1979		Dissolution	
Party	Parliamentary group leader	Seats	%	Seats	%
PPD/PSD	Pedro Roseta (Castelo Branco)	80	32.0	75	30.0
PS	Francisco Salgado Zenha (Porto)	74	29.6	74	29.6
PCP	Carlos Brito (Faro)	44	17.6	44	17.6
CDS	Narana Coissoró (Lisbon)	43	17.2	43	17.2
PPM	Augusto Ferreira do Amaral (Lisbon)	5	2.0	5	2.0
MDP/CDE	José Tengarrinha (Lisbon)	3	1.2	3	1.2
UDP	Mário Tomé (Lisbon)	1	0.4	1	0.4
DR	Francisco Sousa Tavares (Évora); José Medeiros Ferreira (Lisbon); Armando Adão Silva (Lisbon); Nuno Maria Matos (Lisbon); Pelágio Madureira (Porto)	0	0.0	5	2.0
Total		250	100.0	250	100.0

==== Changes ====
- In January 1980, Francisco Sousa Tavares, José Medeiros Ferreira, Armando Adão Silva, Nuno Maria Matos and Pelágio Madureira, elected in the lists of the Democratic Alliance, left the Social Democratic Caucus and formed their own parliamentary group, the Reformers.

== Election for President of the Assembly of the Republic ==
To be elected, a candidate needs to reach a minimum of 132 votes. Vasco da Gama Fernandes, from the Socialist Party, was easily elected:

Election of the President of the Assembly of the Republic
1st Ballot →	29 July 1976	
Required majority →	132 out of 263	
Vasco da Gama Fernandes (PS)	215 / 263	check
Against	4 / 263	
Blank ballots	0 / 263	
Invalid ballots	0 / 263	
Absentees	44 / 263	

At the end of each parliamentary session, the regiment called for a new election to elect the President. As such, a new ballot was held in the beginning of the second session, where Vasco da Gama Fernandes was re-elected.

Election of the President of the Assembly of the Republic
1st Ballot →	25 October 1977	
Required majority →	132 out of 263	
Vasco da Gama Fernandes (PS)	143 / 263	check
Against	0 / 263	
Blank ballots	41 / 263	
Invalid ballots	4 / 263	
Absentees	35 / 263	

At the beginning of the third session, Vasco da Gama Fernandes decided not to run again for president. As such, the Socialist Party appointed Teófilo Carvalho dos Santos as the new candidate. He was elected.

Election of the President of the Assembly of the Republic
1st Ballot →	30 October 1978	
Required majority →	132 out of 263	
Teófilo Carvalho dos Santos (PS)	134 / 263	check
Against	84 / 263	
Blank ballots	1 / 263	
Invalid ballots	3 / 263	
Abstentions	8 / 250	
Absentees	33 / 263	

After the 1979 elections, the Social Democratic Party proposed Leonardo Ribeiro de Almeida as a candidate, who ran against the incumbent president, Teófilo Carvalho dos Santos. Leonardo Ribeiro de Almeida was elected.

Election of the President of the Assembly of the Republic
Ballot →	8 January 1980	
Required majority →	126 out of 250	
Leonardo Ribeiro de Almeida (PPD/PSD)	129 / 250	check
Teófilo Carvalho dos Santos (PS)	119 / 250	☒
Blank ballots	1 / 250	
Invalid ballots	0 / 250	
Absentees	1 / 250	
