= List of presidents of the Assembly of the Republic (Portugal) =

President of the Assembly of the Republic of Portugal
- Presidente da Assembleia da República
- Emblem of the Assembly of the Republic

- Flag of the Assembly of the Republic

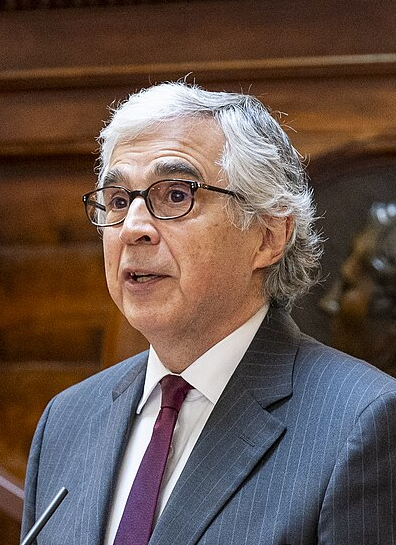
- Incumbent; José Pedro Aguiar-Branco since 27 March 2024
- Style: Mr President (within the Assembly of the Republic); His Excellency (diplomatic)
- Appointer: Assembly of the Republic
- Term length: No term limit
- Constituting instrument: Constitution of Portugal
- Inaugural holder: Vasco da Gama Fernandes
- Formation: 29 July 1976; 50 years ago
- Salary: €123,886 annually
- Website: www.parlamento.pt

This is a list of presidents of the Assembly of the Republic, the unicameral legislative body of Portugal. The President of the Assembly of the Republic is the second highest figure of the Portuguese State, and temporarily replaces the President of the Republic in case of a temporary impediment or vacancy of the office until the swearing in of a new President. The President of the Assembly ensures that parliamentary rules are followed, and oversees the functioning of parliamentary procedures at various levels.

== List ==
The colors indicate the political affiliation of each president.

Socialist
Social Democratic
Democratic Social Center

Term	No.	Portrait	Name (Lifespan)	Term of office			Party
Term	No.	Portrait	Name (Lifespan)	Start	End	Duration	Party
President of the Constituent Assembly (1975–1976)
C.	–		Henrique de Barros (1904–2000)	3 June 1975	2 April 1976	304 days	Socialist
President of the Assembly of the Republic (1976–present)
I	1		Vasco da Gama Fernandes (1908–1991)	29 July 1976	29 October 1978	2 years, 92 days	Socialist
I	2		Teófilo Carvalho dos Santos (1906–1986)	30 October 1978	7 January 1980	1 year, 69 days	Socialist
I	3		Leonardo Ribeiro de Almeida (1924–2006)	8 January 1980	21 October 1981	1 year, 286 days	Social Democratic
II	3		Leonardo Ribeiro de Almeida (1924–2006)	8 January 1980	21 October 1981	1 year, 286 days	Social Democratic
II	4		Francisco de Oliveira Dias (1930–2019)	22 October 1981	2 November 1982	1 year, 11 days	Democratic Social Center
II	5		Leonardo Ribeiro de Almeida (1924–2006)	3 November 1982	30 May 1983	208 days	Social Democratic
III	6		Manuel Tito de Morais (1910–1999)	8 June 1983	24 October 1984	1 year, 138 days	Socialist
III	7		Fernando Amaral (1925–2009)	25 October 1984	12 August 1987	2 years, 291 days	Social Democratic
IV	7		Fernando Amaral (1925–2009)	25 October 1984	12 August 1987	2 years, 291 days	Social Democratic
V	8		Vítor Crespo (1932–2014)	25 August 1987	3 November 1991	4 years, 70 days	Social Democratic
VI	9		António Barbosa de Melo (1932–2016)	7 November 1991	26 October 1995	3 years, 353 days	Social Democratic
VII	10		António de Almeida Santos (1926–2016)	31 October 1995	4 April 2002	6 years, 155 days	Socialist
VIII	10		António de Almeida Santos (1926–2016)	31 October 1995	4 April 2002	6 years, 155 days	Socialist
IX	11		João Bosco Mota Amaral (born 1943)	10 April 2002	16 March 2005	2 years, 340 days	Social Democratic
X	12		Jaime Gama (born 1947)	16 March 2005	19 June 2011	6 years, 95 days	Socialist
XI	12		Jaime Gama (born 1947)	16 March 2005	19 June 2011	6 years, 95 days	Socialist
XII	13		Maria da Assunção Esteves (born 1956)	21 June 2011	22 October 2015	4 years, 123 days	Social Democratic
XIII	14		Eduardo Ferro Rodrigues (born 1949)	23 October 2015	29 March 2022	6 years, 157 days	Socialist
XIV	14		Eduardo Ferro Rodrigues (born 1949)	23 October 2015	29 March 2022	6 years, 157 days	Socialist
XV	15		Augusto Santos Silva (born 1956)	29 March 2022	25 March 2024	1 year, 362 days	Socialist
XVI	16		José Pedro Aguiar-Branco (born 1957)	27 March 2024	present	2 years, 164 days	Social Democratic
XVII	16		José Pedro Aguiar-Branco (born 1957)	27 March 2024	present	2 years, 164 days	Social Democratic

=== By time in office ===
Rank	Leader	Party	Time in office	Duration	Legislatures
1	Eduardo Ferro Rodrigues	Socialist	2015–2022	6 years, 157 days	2
2	António Almeida Santos	Socialist	1995–2002	6 years, 155 days	2
3	Jaime Gama	Socialist	2005–2011	6 years, 95 days	2
4	Assunção Esteves	Social Democratic	2011–2015	4 years, 123 days	1
5	Vítor Crespo	Social Democratic	1987–1991	4 years, 70 days	1
6	António Barbosa de Melo	Social Democratic	1991–1995	3 years, 353 days	1
7	João Bosco Mota Amaral	Social Democratic	2002–2005	2 years, 340 days	1
8	Fernando Amaral	Social Democratic	1984–1987	2 years, 291 days	2
9	José Pedro Aguiar-Branco	Social Democratic	2024–present	2 years, 164 days (Incumbent)	2
10	Leonardo Ribeiro de Almeida	Social Democratic	1980–1981; 1982–1983	2 years, 129 days	2
11	Vasco da Gama Fernandes	Socialist	1976–1978	2 years, 92 days	1
12	Augusto Santos Silva	Socialist	2022–2024	1 year, 362 days	1
13	Manuel Tito de Morais	Socialist	1983–1984	1 year, 138 days	1
14	Teófilo Carvalho dos Santos	Socialist	1978–1980	1 year, 69 days	1
15	Francisco de Oliveira Dias	Centrist	1981–1982	1 year, 11 days	1
16	Henrique de Barros	Socialist	1975–1976	304 days	1

== See also ==
- Assembly of the Republic (Portugal)
