= 3rd Legislature of the Third Portuguese Republic =

←	2nd Legislature	4th Legislature	→

Overview
- Legislative body: Assembly of the Republic
- Meeting place: Palace of Saint Benedict
- Term: 31 May 1983 – 3 November 1985
- Election: 25 April 1983
- Government: IX Constitutional Government
- Website: parlamento.pt

Deputies
- Members: 250
- President: Manuel Tito de Morais (PS) (1983–1984); Fernando Monteiro do Amaral (PPD/PSD) (1984–1985)
- First Vice-President: Fernando Monteiro do Amaral (PPD/PSD) (1983–1984); Manuel Tito de Morais (PS) (1984–1985)
- Second Vice-President: José Luís Nunes (PS)
- Third Vice-President: José Vitoriano (PCP)
- Fourth Vice-President: Basílio Horta (CDS)

The 3rd Legislature of the Third Portuguese Republic (Portuguese: III Legislatura da Terceira República Portuguesa) ran from 31 May 1983 to 3 November 1985. The composition of the Assembly of the Republic, the legislative body of Portugal, was determined by the results of the 1983 legislative election, held on 25 April 1983.

After the election of Aníbal Cavaco Silva as Social Democratic Party (PPD/PSD) leader, in May 1985, he ended the coalition with the Socialists and the then Prime Minister Mário Soares resigned. President António Ramalho Eanes dissolved Parliament on 4 June 1985 and called an election for 6 October 1985.

== Election ==
The 4th Portuguese legislative election was held on 25 April 1983. In the election, the Socialist Party (PS) won the most seats and formed a majority coalition government with the PPD/PSD, called Central Bloc.

Party	Assembly of the Republic			
Party	Votes	%	Seats	+/−
PS	2,061,309	36.11	101	+35
PPD/PSD	1,554,804	27.24	75	–7
APU	1,031,609	18.07	44	+3
CDS	716,705	12.56	30	–16
Other/blank/invalid	343,208	6.01	0	–7
Total	5,707,695	100.00	250	±0

== Composition (1983–1985) ==
Party	Parliamentary group leader	Elected	
Party	Parliamentary group leader	Seats	%
PS	Walter Rosa (Porto)	94	37.6
PPD/PSD	Fernando Condesso (Santarém) (1983–1984); António Capucho (Faro) (1984–1985)	75	30.0
PCP	Carlos Brito (Faro)	41	16.4
CDS	José Luís Nogueira de Brito (Braga)	30	12.0
UEDS	António Lopes Cardoso (Lisbon)	4	1.6
ASDI	José Furtado Fernandes (Santarém)	3	1.2
MDP/CDE	João Corregedor da Fonseca (Setúbal)	3	1.2
Total		250	100.0

== Election for President of the Assembly of the Republic ==
To be elected, a candidate needs to reach a minimum of 126 votes. Due to the Central Bloc agreement between PS and PPD/PSD, both parties would support the same candidate and would rotate the post of President. For the first session of the legislature, only Manuel Tito de Morais, from the Socialist Party, was on the ballot and was easily elected:

Election of the President of the Assembly of the Republic
1st Ballot →	8 June 1983	
Required majority →	126 out of 250	
Manuel Tito de Morais (PS)	170 / 250	check
Against	29 / 250	
Blank ballots	10 / 250	
Invalid ballots	0 / 250	
Abstentions	25 / 250	
Absentees	16 / 250	

A year later, on October 1984, another ballot was called to elect a new President of the Assembly. President Fernando Monteiro do Amaral, from the Social Democratic Party, was the sole candidate on the ballot and was easily elected:

Election of the President of the Assembly of the Republic
1st Ballot →	25 October 1984	
Required majority →	126 out of 250	
Fernando Monteiro do Amaral (PPD/PSD)	174 / 250	check
Against	30 / 250	
Blank ballots	1 / 250	
Invalid ballots	3 / 250	
Abstentions	22 / 250	
Absentees	23 / 250	
