= 4th Legislature of the Third Portuguese Republic =

| ← | 3rd Legislature | 5th Legislature | → |

Overview
- Legislative body: Assembly of the Republic
- Meeting place: Palace of Saint Benedict
- Term: 4 November 1985 – 12 August 1987
- Election: 6 October 1985
- Government: X Constitutional Government
- Website: parlamento.pt

Deputies
- Members: 250
- President: Fernando Monteiro do Amaral (PPD/PSD)
- First Vice-President: António Marques Mendes (PPD/PSD)
- Second Vice-President: Carlos Cardoso Lage (PS)
- Third Vice-President: António Marques Júnior (PRD)
- Fourth Vice-President: José Vitoriano (PCP)

The 4th Legislature of the Third Portuguese Republic (Portuguese: IV Legislatura da Terceira República Portuguesa) ran from 4 November 1985 to 12 August 1987. The composition of the Assembly of the Republic, the legislative body of Portugal, was determined by the results of the 1985 legislative election, held on 6 October 1985.

In April 1987, Aníbal Cavaco Silva's government was defeated by a motion of no confidence in Parliament and the government fell. The opposition parties, the Socialist Party (PS), the Democratic Renewal Party (PRD) and the United People Alliance (APU), proposed an alternative government between them, to avoid elections, but this was rejected by President Mário Soares, who decided to dissolve the Assembly and call an election for 19 July 1987.

== Election ==
The 5th Portuguese legislative election was held on 6 October 1985. In the election, the Social Democratic Party (PPD/PSD) won the most seats and formed a minority government.

| Party | Assembly of the Republic | | | |
| Party | Votes | % | Seats | +/− |
|---|---|---|---|---|
| PPD/PSD | 1,732,288 | 29.87 | 88 | +13 |
| PS | 1,204,321 | 20.77 | 57 | –44 |
| PRD | 1,038,893 | 17.92 | 45 | +45 |
| APU | 898,281 | 15.49 | 38 | –6 |
| CDS | 577,580 | 9.96 | 22 | –8 |
| Other/blank/invalid | 347,566 | 5.99 | 0 | ±0 |
| Total | 5,798,929 | 100.00 | 250 | ±0 |

== Composition (1985–1987) ==
| Party | Parliamentary group leader | Elected | | Dissolution | |
| Party | Parliamentary group leader | Seats | % | Seats | % |
|---|---|---|---|---|---|
| PPD/PSD | António Capucho (Faro) | 88 | 35.2 | 87 | 34.8 |
| PS | José Luís Nunes (Porto) (1985–1986); Ferraz de Abreu (Aveiro) (1986–1987) | 57 | 22.8 | 56 | 22.4 |
| PRD | Hermínio Martinho (Santarém) | 45 | 18.0 | 45 | 18.0 |
| PCP | Carlos Brito (Faro) | 35 | 14.0 | 34 | 13.6 |
| CDS | Narana Coissoró (Lisbon) | 22 | 8.8 | 22 | 8.8 |
| MDP/CDE | João Corregedor da Fonseca (Setúbal) | 3 | 1.2 | 3 | 1.2 |
| Independent | Gonçalo Ribeiro Telles (Porto); Maria Amélia Santos (Lisbon); Rui Oliveira e Costa (Lisbon) | 0 | 0.0 | 3 | 1.2 |
| Total | | 250 | 100.0 | 250 | 100.0 |

=== Changes ===
- On 16 November 1985, MP Gonçalo Ribeiro Telles, elected in the Socialist Party lists, left the party and became an Independent, following the agreement he made with the party in order to be elected in the 1985 elections.
- Also on 16 November 1985, MP Maria Amélia Santos, elected in the United People Alliance lists, became an Independent representing the Ecologist Party "The Greens".
- On 24 June 1986, MP Rui Oliveira e Costa, elected in the Social Democratic Party lists, became an Independent after leaving the PSD caucus following disagreements with the party regarding policy and the 1986 Presidential election.

== Election for President of the Assembly of the Republic ==
To be elected, a candidate needs to reach a minimum of 126 votes. There were two candidates on the ballot: Incumbent President Fernando Monteiro do Amaral, from the Social Democratic Party, and former President of the Assembly Manuel Tito de Morais, from the Socialist Party. Monteiro do Amaral was easily reelected.

Election of the President of the Assembly of the Republic
| 1st Ballot → | 8 November 1985 | |
| Required majority → | 126 out of 250 | |
| Fernando Monteiro do Amaral (PPD/PSD) | 160 / 250 | check |
| Manuel Tito de Morais (PS) | 62 / 250 | ☒ |
| Blank ballots | 12 / 250 | |
| Invalid ballots | 1 / 250 | |
| Absentees | 15 / 250 | |

One year later, on 28 October 1986, another ballot was called to elect, again, the President of the Assembly. Only incumbent President Fernando Monteiro do Amaral, from the Social Democratic Party, was on the ballot and he was reelected as President:

Election of the President of the Assembly of the Republic
| 1st Ballot → | 28 October 1986 | |
| Required majority → | 126 out of 250 | |
| Fernando Monteiro do Amaral (PPD/PSD) | 131 / 250 | check |
| Against | 35 / 250 | |
| Blank ballots | 6 / 250 | |
| Invalid ballots | 3 / 250 | |
| Abstentions | 12 / 250 | |
| Absentees | 63 / 250 | |
