= 12th Legislature of the Third Portuguese Republic =

←	11th Legislature	13th Legislature	→

Overview
- Legislative body: Assembly of the Republic
- Meeting place: Palace of Saint Benedict
- Term: 20 June 2011 – 22 October 2015
- Election: 5 June 2011
- Government: XIX Constitutional Government
- Website: parlamento.pt

Deputies
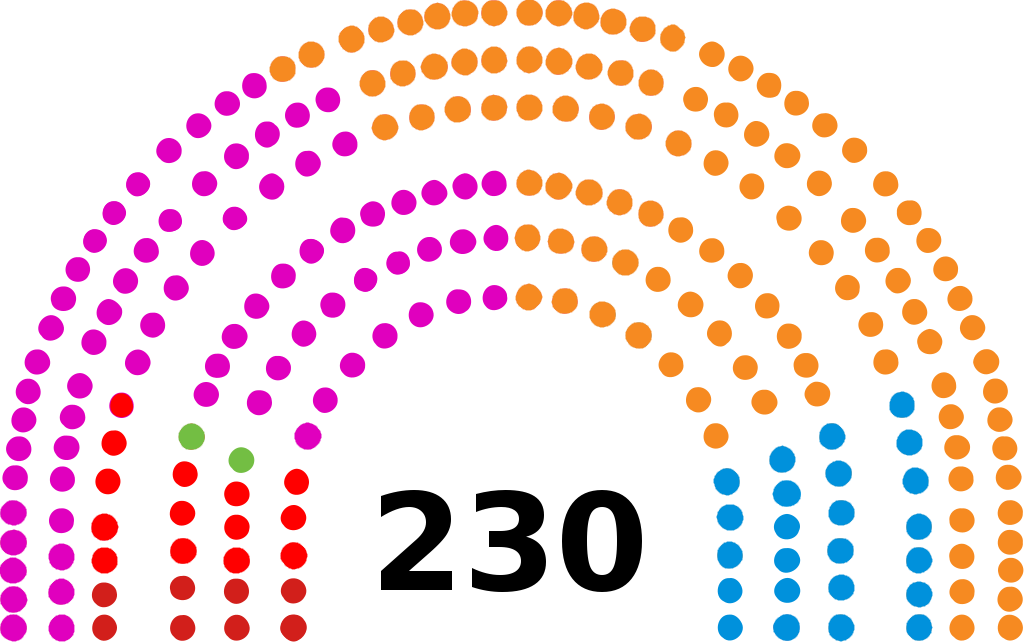
- Members: 230
- President: Assunção Esteves (PPD/PSD)
- First Vice-President: Guilherme Silva (PPD/PSD)
- Second Vice-President: Eduardo Ferro Rodrigues (PS) (2011–2014); Júlio Miranda Calha (PS) (2014–2015)
- Third Vice-President: Teresa Caeiro (CDS–PP)
- Fourth Vice-President: António Filipe (PCP)

The 12th Legislature of the Third Portuguese Republic (Portuguese: XII Legislatura da Terceira República Portuguesa) ran from 20 October 2011 to 22 October 2015. The composition of the Assembly of the Republic, the legislative body of Portugal, was determined by the results of the 2011 legislative election, held on 5 June 2011.

== Election ==
The 13th Portuguese legislative election was held on 5 June 2011. In the election, the Social Democratic Party (PPD/PSD) became the largest party but fell short of a majority, relying on the CDS – People's Party (CDS–PP) to form a majority coalition government.

Party	Assembly of the Republic			
Party	Votes	%	Seats	+/−
PPD/PSD	2,159,181	38.66	108	+27
PS	1,566,347	28.05	74	–23
CDS–PP	653,888	11.71	24	+3
CDU	441,147	7.90	16	+1
BE	288,923	5.17	8	–8
Other/blank/invalid	475,143	8.49	0	±0
Total	5,585,054	100.00	230	±0

== Composition (2011–2015) ==
Party	Parliamentary group leader	Elected	
Party	Parliamentary group leader	Seats	%
PPD/PSD	Luís Montenegro (Aveiro)	108	47.0
PS	Maria de Belém Roseira (Lisbon) (2011); Carlos Zorrinho (Évora) (2011–2013); Alberto Martins (Porto) (2013–2014); Eduardo Ferro Rodrigues (Lisbon) (2014–2015)	74	32.2
CDS–PP	Nuno Magalhães (Setúbal)	24	10.4
PCP	Bernardino Soares (Lisbon) (2011–2013); João Oliveira (Évora) (2013–2015)	14	6.1
BE	Luís Fazenda (Lisbon) (2011–2012); Pedro Filipe Soares (Aveiro) (2012–2015)	8	3.5
PEV	Heloísa Apolónia (Setúbal)	2	0.9
Total		230	100.0

== Election for President of the Assembly of the Republic ==
To be elected, a candidate needs to reach a minimum of 116 votes. The Social Democratic Party (PSD) proposed Fernando Nobre as their candidate for president. The CDS – People's Party (CDS–PP) announced that they would abstain from voting for Fernando Nobre, citing concerns that the party didn't consider Nobre to be worthy of being the second most important state figure. The first ballot occurred on 20 June 2011, where Fernando Nobre failed to be elected:

Election of the President of the Assembly of the Republic
Ballot →	20 June 2011	
Required majority →	116 out of 230	
Fernando Nobre (PPD/PSD)	106 / 230	X mark
Blank ballots	101 / 230	
Invalid ballots	21 / 230	
Absentees	2 / 230	

Following the first ballot, a second ballot was required to take place in the same day. Fernando Nobre was once again the only candidate on the ballot, failing once again to achieve a majority:

Election of the President of the Assembly of the Republic
Ballot →	20 June 2011	
Required majority →	116 out of 230	
Fernando Nobre (PPD/PSD)	105 / 230	X mark
Blank ballots	101 / 230	
Invalid ballots	22 / 230	
Absentees	2 / 230	

A third ballot was scheduled for the next day, 21 June. Fernando Nobre decided to withdraw his candidacy, and the PSD proposed Assunção Esteves as their candidate for president, this time with the support of the CDS–PP. Assunção Esteves was easily elected, becoming the first woman President of the Assembly of the Republic:

Election of the President of the Assembly of the Republic
Ballot →	21 June 2011	
Required majority →	116 out of 230	
Assunção Esteves (PPD/PSD)	186 / 230	check
Blank ballots	41 / 230	
Invalid ballots	2 / 230	
Absentees	1 / 230	
