= 11th Legislature of the Third Portuguese Republic =

←	10th Legislature	12th Legislature	→

Overview
- Legislative body: Assembly of the Republic
- Meeting place: Palace of Saint Benedict
- Term: 15 October 2009 – 19 June 2011
- Election: 27 September 2009
- Government: XVIII Constitutional Government
- Website: parlamento.pt

Deputies
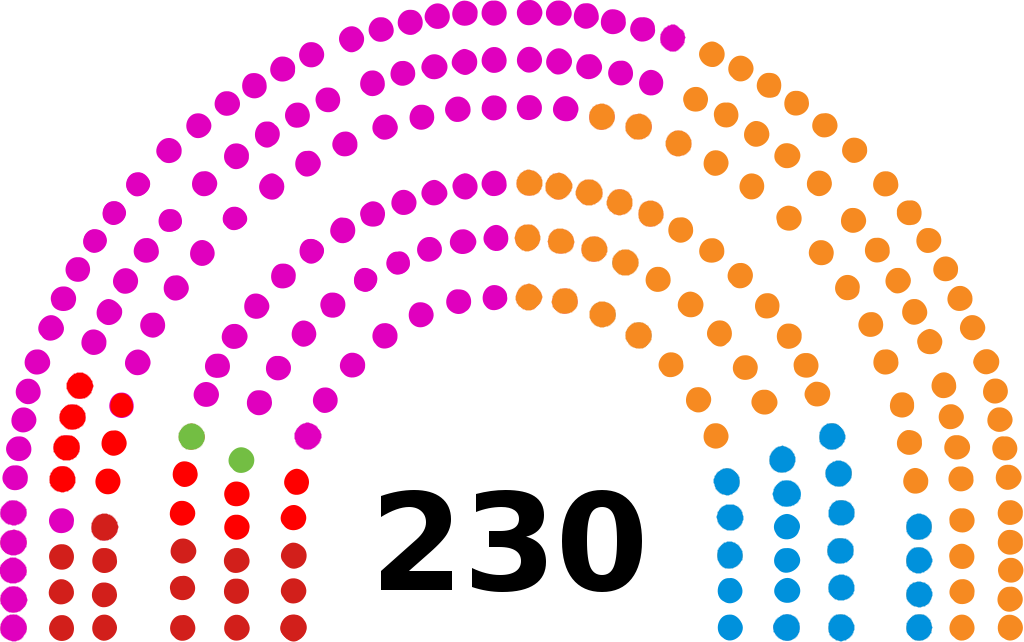
- Members: 230
- President: Jaime Gama (PS)
- First Vice-President: José Vera Jardim (PS)
- Second Vice-President: Guilherme Silva (PPD/PSD)
- Third Vice-President: Teresa Caeiro (CDS–PP)
- Fourth Vice-President: Luís Fazenda (BE)

The 11th Legislature of the Third Portuguese Republic (Portuguese: XI Legislatura da Terceira República Portuguesa) was a meeting of the Assembly of the Republic, the legislative body of Portugal. It convened on 15 October 2009, with its membership determined by the results of the 2009 Portuguese legislative election held the previous 27 September.

After the Fourth Stability and Growth Program, presented by the Socialist Party Government, failed to achieve a majority in Parliament, Prime Minister José Sócrates resigned and President Aníbal Cavaco Silva dissolved the Assembly of the Republic, calling a snap election in June 2011. The Legislature ended on 19 June 2011.

== Election ==
The 12th Portuguese legislative election was held on 27 September 2009. In the election, the Socialist Party (PS) remained the largest party but lost its majority.

Party	Assembly of the Republic			
Party	Votes	%	Seats	+/−
PS	2,077,238	36.56	97	–24
PPD/PSD	1,653,665	29.11	81	+6
CDS–PP	592,778	10.43	21	+9
BE	557,306	9.81	16	+8
CDU	446,279	7.86	15	+1
Other/blank/invalid	353,992	6.23	0	±0
Total	5,681,258	100.00	230	±0

== Composition (2009–2011) ==
Party	Parliamentary group leader	Elected	
Party	Parliamentary group leader	Seats	%
PS	Francisco Assis (Guarda)	97	42.2
PPD/PSD	José Pedro Aguiar-Branco (Porto) (2009–2010); Miguel Macedo (Braga) (2010–2011)	81	35.2
CDS–PP	Pedro Mota Soares (Lisbon)	21	9.1
BE	José Manuel Pureza (Coimbra)	16	7.0
PCP	Bernardino Soares (Lisbon)	13	5.7
PEV	Heloísa Apolónia (Setúbal)	2	0.9
Total		230	100.0

== Election for President of the Assembly of the Republic ==
To be elected, a candidate needs to reach a minimum of 116 votes. Then incumbent President of the Assembly Jaime Gama, since 2005, ran for a second term and was easily re-elected:

Election of the President of the Assembly of the Republic
Ballot →	15 October 2009	
Required majority →	116 out of 230	
Jaime Gama (PS)	204 / 230	check
Blank ballots	24 / 230	
Invalid ballots	0 / 230	
Absentees	2 / 230	
