= José Filipe Moraes Cabral =

Portuguese academic, author and diplomat

Permanent Representative to the United Nations
- In office 21 January 2009 – 31 January 2013
- President: Aníbal Cavaco Silva
- Preceded by: João Manuel Salgueiro
- Succeeded by: Álvaro Mendonça e Moura

Chief of the Civilian House
- In office 9 March 2001 – 27 October 2004
- President: Jorge Sampaio
- Preceded by: António Franco
- Succeeded by: João Bonifácio Serra

Personal details
- Born: December 6, 1950 (age 75) Lisbon, Portugal
- Party: Social Democratic Party
- Spouse: Lydia Reinhold
- Education: University of Brussels

José Filipe Moraes Cabral (born 6 December 1950) is a Portuguese academic, author and diplomat who previously served as the Portuguese Permanent Representative to the United Nations from 2008 until 2013.

== Career in the Diplomatic Service ==
Cabral joined Portugal's diplomatic service in 1979. From 1982 to 1991 he worked in diplomatic positions in Portugal's missions to Canada, Morocco, Saudi Arabia, and the European Union.

From 1992 to 1993, Moraes Cabral was an advisor to the Portuguese Permanent Representation to the European Union.

In 1999 he became Portugal's ambassador to Israel, and held this post until 2001, when he became chief of staff to Portuguese President Jorge Sampaio. From 2004 to 2008 he was Portuguese ambassador to Spain, and in December 2008 he became the Permanent Representative to the United Nations in New York, the most prestigious post in the Portuguese Diplomatic Service.

In November 2011, Cabral was President of the United Nations Security Council.

== Education ==
The ambassador attended the University of Brussels, graduating with a degree in 'Sciences Politiques et Diplomatiques' which would translate into a present-day degree in International Relations, in 1973.

== Personal life ==
Moraes Cabral married Lydia Reinhold and together they are parents to three children. He holds many honourable distinctions from various countries he has served in including the Commandeur de la Légion D'Honneur, from the French Government.
