= Constituent Assembly of Portugal =

Constituent Assembly Assembleia Constituinte

Type
- Type: Unicameral

History
- Established: 2 June 1975
- Disbanded: 2 April 1976
- Succeeded by: 1st Legislature

Leadership
- President: Henrique de Barros, Socialist Party
- Vice Presidents: Vasco da Gama Fernandes, Socialist Party; Francisco Pinto Balsemão, Democratic People's Party; José Tavares Magro, Communist Party

Structure
- Seats: 250
- Political groups: PS (116); PPD (81); PCP (30); CDS (16); MDP/CDE (5); UDP (1); ADIM (1)

Elections
- Voting system: Party-list proportional representation
- Last election: 25 April 1975

Meeting place
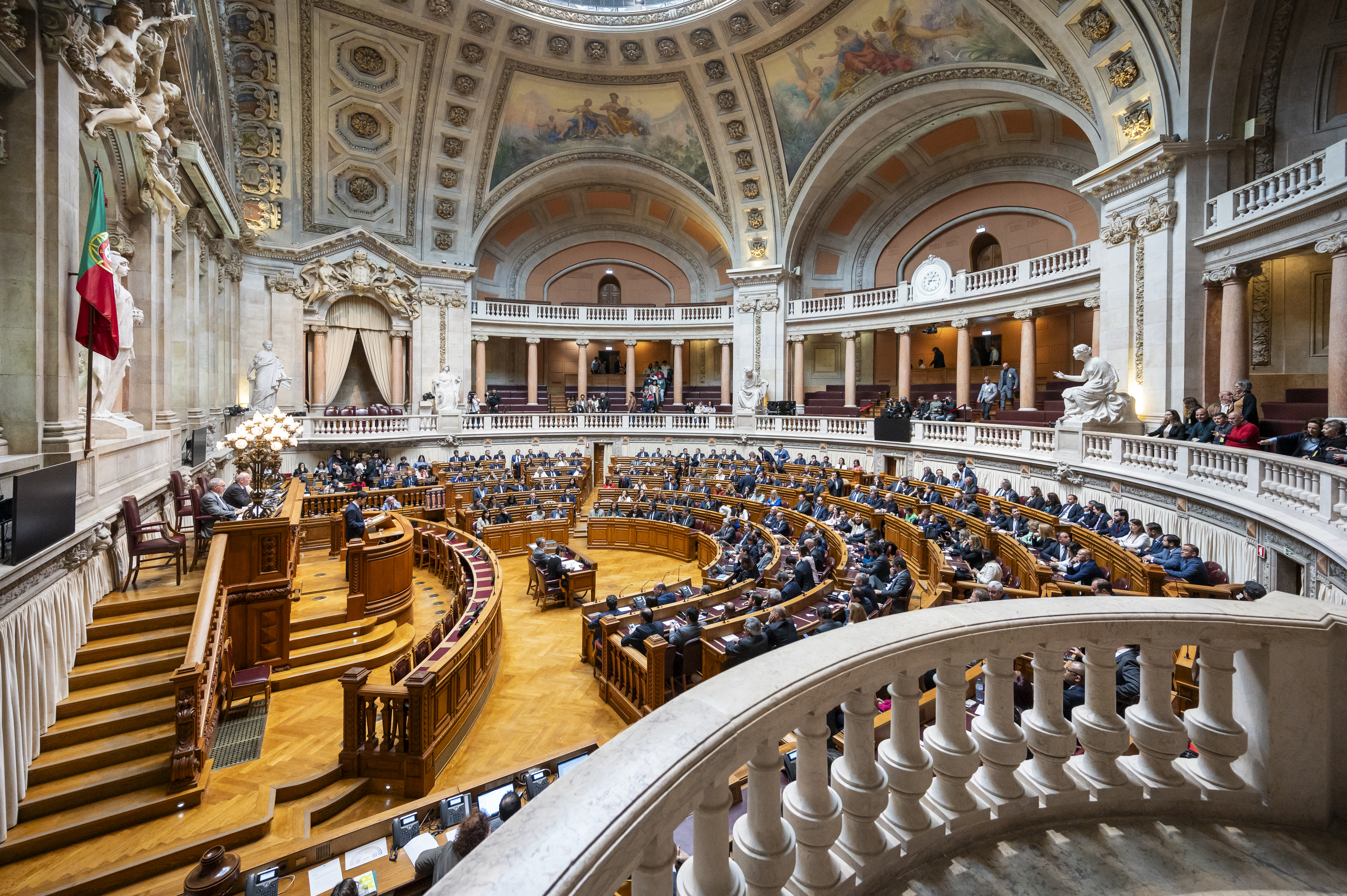
- São Bento Palace, Lisbon, Portugal

The Constituent Assembly (Portuguese: Assembleia Constituinte) was the Portuguese constituent assembly elected on 25 April 1975, after the Carnation Revolution (25 April 1974), for the purpose of adopting a constitution for the Third Portuguese Republic, the Constitution of 1976.

== Background ==
After the Carnation Revolution, the National Salvation Junta dissolved all political offices previously existing in the Estado Novo (Law no. 1/74). On 14 May 1974, the President of the National Salvation Junta, António de Spínola, abolished the National Assembly and the Corporative Chamber (Law no. 2/74), the two parliamentary chambers in the Estado Novo, and established a transitory constitution (Law no. 3/74) to be used until the new constitution was approved.

== Election ==
The election of the Constituent Assembly was carried out in Portugal on 25 April 1975, exactly one year after the Carnation Revolution and was the first free election in fifty years, the first in the new democratic regime created after the revolution.

The election was won by the Socialist Party, with the Democratic People's Party being the second most voted party. The parliament had a large majority of moderate parties, from Socialism to Centrism, meaning a victory of "democratic legitimacy over revolutionary legitimacy". A new Constitution was approved on 2 April 1976.

Party	Constituent Assembly		
Party	Votes	%	Seats
PS	2,162,972	37.87	116
PPD	1,507,282	26.39	81
PCP	711,935	12.46	30
CDS	434,879	7.61	16
MDP/CDE	236,318	4.14	5
UDP	44,877	0.79	1
ADIM (Note: Independent Democratic Association of Macau electoral list only in Macau.)	1,622	0.03	1
Other/blank/invalid	611,944	10.71	0
Total	5,711,829	100.00	250

== Composition ==
Party	Parliamentary group leader	Elected		Dissolution	
Party	Parliamentary group leader	Seats	%	Seats	%
PS	António Lopes Cardoso (Beja)	116	46.4	116	46.4
PPD	Carlos Mota Pinto (Coimbra) (1975); António Barbosa de Melo (Coimbra) (1975–1976)	81	32.4	60	24.0
PCP	Octávio Pato (Lisbon)	30	12.0	30	12.0
CDS	Victor Sá Machado (Lisbon)	16	6.4	16	6.4
MDP/CDE	José Tengarrinha (Lisbon)	5	2.0	5	2.0
UDP	João Pulido Valente (Lisbon)	1	0.4	1	0.4
ADIM	Diamantino de Oliveira Ferreira (Macau)	1	0.4	1	0.4
Independent	Various PPD deputies	0	0.0	21	8.4
Total		250	100.0	250	100.0

=== Changes ===
- Several Democratic People's Party (PPD) MPs → Independent: A total of 21 PPD MPs, including the party's parliamentary group leader, Carlos Mota Pinto, announced, on December 1975, that they were leaving the PPD and would become Independents, following deep disagreements with the party's leader, Francisco Sá Carneiro, regarding the ideology direction and policies of the party.

== Election for President of the Constituent Assembly ==
To be elected, a candidate needed to reach a minimum of 126 votes. The then interim President Henrique de Barros, from the Socialist Party, was easily elected:

Election of the President of the Constituent Assembly
Ballot →	5 June 1975	
Required majority →	126 out of 250	
Henrique de Barros (PS)	233 / 250	check
Vasco da Gama Fernandes (PS)	1 / 250	X mark
Blank ballots	2 / 250	
Invalid ballots	4 / 250	
Absentees	10 / 250	

== See also ==
- Assembly of the Republic
- Constitution of Portugal
- History of Portugal
- São Bento Palace
