= List of ambassadors of Portugal to Spain =

Ambassador of Portugal to Spain
- Incumbent; José Augusto Duarte since April 4, 2025
- Style: His Excellency (formal); Mr. Ambassador (informal)
- Residence: 88 Calle Lagasca, Madrid
- Appointer: President of the Portuguese Republic with the advice and consent of the Government
- Website: Embaixada de Portugal em Espanha

The Ambassador of Portugal to Spain is the highest legal representative of Portugal to the Kingdom of Spain through the Embassy of Portugal in Madrid.

== History ==
Relations between Portugal and the Kingdoms of the Iberian Peninsula that would later constitute modern Spain, especially the Kingdom of León and the Kingdom of Castile, date back to the 12th century, when Portugal was established as an independent political unit.
On 5 October 1143, King Alfonso VII of León and Castile signed the Treaty of Zamora in which he recognized Afonso Henriques as King of Portugal.

A formal Portuguese diplomatic mission to Spain has existed since 1669. The first Portuguese ambassador, Count Miranda, was accredited to the Spanish court from 1668 to 1670.

The permanent Portuguese embassy in the capital, Madrid, is located in a villa built in 1908 at number 88 Calle Lagasca.

A Portuguese consulate general is also located there, with two others in Barcelona and Seville, and a vice-consulate in Vigo. Portuguese honorary consulates in Spain also exist in A Coruña, Badajoz, Bilbao, Cáceres, Las Palmas de Gran Canária, Málaga, Santa Cruz de Tenerife and in Ceuta.

== List of representatives ==
Portuguese Ambassadors in Spain
Name	Portrait	Period	Remarks
Kingdom of Portugal
Henrique de Sousa Tavares (Conde de Miranda)		13 June 1669 – 1670	Ambassador
João da Silva, marquês de Gouveia (pt)		1670 – 2 October 1673	Ambassador
Duarte Ribeiro de Macedo (pt)		1676 – 1679	Envoy
Diogo Gomes de Figueiredo		1676	Special Envoy
Mendo de Fóios Pereira		1679 – 1686	Envoy
António de Freitas Branco		1686 – 1688	
José de Faria		1688 – 1699	Envoy
Manuel Jacques de Magalhães (Visconde da Fonte Arcada) (pt)		1689	Special Envoy on a Special Mission
Pedro de Figueiredo de Alarcão		1690	Special Envoy on a Special Mission
Diogo de Mendonça Corte-Real		1694 – 13 December 1703	Special Envoy
João de Almeida Portugal (Conde Assumar) (pt)		1705 – 22 July 1712	Special Envoy at the Court of Charles VI
D Henrique Henriques		1712	
Pedro de Vasconcelos e Sousa (pt)		1716 – 5 October 1718	Special Ambassador
Manuel Sequeira		1718 – 16 September 1719	Representative, on 20 February 1719 accredited
Luís da Cunha		May 1719 – 4 September 1720	Special Ambassador
António Guedes Pereira		1720 – 1727	Special Envoy
Joaquim Severino Gomes		February 1725 – March 1725	Chargé d'affaires
José da Cunha Brochado (pt)		8 June 1725 – 29 December 1725	Minister Plenipotentiary, on 8 June 1725 accredited
Rodrigo Anes de Sá Almeida e Meneses (Marquês de Abrantes)		19 March 1727 – 1729	Special Ambassador, on 25 December 1727 accredited
Padre Manuel Ribeiro		1729 – 1731	
Pedro Alvares Cabral		1729 – 21 March 1735	Minister Plenipotentiary
Conde de Tarouca		1737 – ?	Ambassador
Tomás Teles da Silva (Visconde de Vila Nova de Cerveira) (pt)		October 1746 – February 1753	Special Ambassador
Rodrigo Xavier Teles de Castro e Silveira (Conde de Unhão)		February 1753 – 2 November 1757	Special Ambassador and Minister Plenipotentiary
António de Saldanha da Gama		September 1757 – April 1760	Special Ambassador and Minister Plenipotentiary
José da Silva Pessanha		February 1760 – 1 May 1762	Special Ambassador and Minister Plenipotentiary
Aires de Sá e Melo (pt)		29 November 1764 – 30 January 1775	Ambassador, on 9 December 1764 accredited
João Crisóstomo Pereira Barbosa		22 May 1771 – 14 July 1772	Chargé d'affaires
Amador José da Costa Asso		30 July 1772 – 8 February 1773	Chargé d'affaires
Francisco Inocêncio de Sousa Coutinho (pt)		6 March 1775 – 6 February 1780	Special Ambassador, on 10 March 1775 accredited
António Lobo da Costa Gama		14 January 1780 – 2 November 1782	Chargé d'affaires
Miguel Lúcio de Portugal e Castro		8 June 1780 – 16 January 1781	Ambassador
António Lobo da Costa Gama		16 January 1781 – 2 November 1781	Chargé d'affaires
Henrique de Meneses (Marquês de Louriçal)		2 November 1781 – 29 May 1787	Ambassador, on 3 November 1782 accredited
José Fernandes da Silva		29 May 1787 – 20 October 1787	Chargé d'affaires
Diogo José de Noronha (pt)		20 October 1787 – February 1789	Ambassador, on 23 October 1787 accredited
Diogo de Carvalho e Sampayo		February 1789 – June 1789	Chargé d'affaires
Diogo de Noronha		June 1789 – November 1789	Ambassador
Diogo de Carvalho Sampaio		November 1789 – July 1790	Chargé d'affaires
Diogo de Noronha		July 1790 – November 1791	Ambassador
Diogo de Carvalho Sampaio		November 1791 – July 1792	Chargé d'affaires
Diogo de Noronha		July 1792 – August 1793	Ambassador
Diogo de Carvalho Sampaio		August 1793 – July 1794	probably Minister Plenipotentiary
Diogo de Noronha		July 1794 – October 1795	Ambassador
Diogo de Carvalho Sampaio		20 October 1795 – June 1796	Minister Plenipotentiary
Alexandre de Sousa Holstein (pl)		1796	Ambassador
Diogo de Carvalho Sampaio		July 1796 – 27 February 1801	Special Ambassador, on 25 July 1796 accredited
José Manuel Pinto		1798	Official
Diogo de Noronha		23 July 1798 – 11 November 1798	Envoy, on 24 July 1798 accredited
José Maria de Sousa		20 February 1801 – February 1801	Minister Plenipotentiary
Miguel Vieira de Abreu		April 1801 – August 1801	Agent without position
Luís Pinto de Sousa Coutinho		July 1801 – August 1801	Minister Plenipotentiary to sign the Treaty of Badajoz (1801)
Cipriano Ribeiro Freire (pt)		13 August 1801 – 5 April 1805	Minister Plenipotentiary
Aires José Maria de Saldanha Albuquerque (Conde de Ega) (pt)		May 1805 – 1 November 1807	Ambassador, on 10 May 1805 accredited
Pedro de Sousa Holstein		14 July 1809 – 26 May 1812	Special Envoy and Minister Plenipotentiary to the Supreme Central Junta, on 23 July 1809 accredited
Joaquim Severino Gomes		26 July 1812 – 27 July 1814	Chargé d'affaires, accredited to the Cortes of Cádiz
José Luís de Sousa (pt)		27 July 1814 – 1817	Special Envoy and Minister Plenipotentiary, on 26 April 1820 again accredited
Domingos António de Sousa Coutinho (Conde do Funchal)		1817 – ?	
António Saldanha da Gama (Conde de Porto Santo)		12 July 1820 – February 1825	Special Envoy and Minister Plenipotentiary
Joaquim Severino Gomes		27 July 1821 – 18 December 1821	Chargé d'affaires
Manuel de Castro Pereira (pt)		2 November 1821 – 2 October 1822	Chargé d'affaires
Joaquim Freire de Andrade Salazar de Eça		28 September 1822 – ?	Chargé d'affaires, on 1 October 1822 accredited
Jacob Frederico Torlade Pereira de Azambuja		1823?	Chargé d'affaires
António Saldanha da Gama (Conde de Porto Santo)		2 January 1824 – February 1825	Ambassador
Manuel Inácio Martins Pamplona Corte Real (Conde de Subserra)		April 1825 – July 1825	Ambassador (Embaixador Ordinário)
Joaquim Severino Gomes		July 1825 – 15 August 1826	Chargé d'affaires
José Luís de Sousa Botelho Mourão e Vasconcelos (Conde de Vila Real)		8 September 1826 – 15 November 1829	Special Envoy and Minister Plenipotentiary
José Guilherme Lima		9 November 1826 – 4 July 1828	Chargé d'affaires
Conde da Figueira		27 June 1828 – 1834	Special Envoy and Minister Plenipotentiary
Kingdom of Portugal (1830–1910)
Alexandre Tomás de Morais Sarmento (Visconde do Banho) (pt)		1830	Chargé d'affaires
José Guilherme Lima		20 March 1830 – 31 July 1833	Chargé d'affaires
Visconde do Banho		6 March 1834 – 19 December 1834	Chargé d'affaires
José Guilherme Lima		20 December 1834 – 15 May 1837	Chargé d'affaires, on 31 December 1834 accredited
Francisco de Almeida Portugal (Conde de Lavradio) (pt)		1835	Special Envoy and Minister Plenipotentiary
Joaquim António Velez Barreiros (Barão da Luz)		16 April 1837 – 7 November 1837	Chargé d'affaires, on 15 May 1837 accredited
José Guilherme Lima		8 November 1837 – 11 July 1845	Minister Plenipotentiary, on 10 November 1837 accredited
João Carlos de Saldanha Oliveira e Daun (Duque de Saldanha)		7 November 1840 – 4 October 1841	Minister Plenipotentiary, on 19 November 1840 accredited
Simão da Silva Ferraz de Lima e Castro (Conde de Rendufe)		27 March 1846 – 2 November 1846	Minister Plenipotentiary, on 27 March 1846 accredited
António Bernardo da Costa Cabral (Conde de Tomar)		1 December 1846 – 12 August 1847	Minister Plenipotentiary, on 3 December 1846 accredited
José António Soares Leal (pt)		13 August 1847 – 24 November 1847	Chargé d'affaires
Vasco Pinto de Sousa Coutinho (Visconde de Balsemão)		26 November 1847 – 12 April 1848	Chargé d'affaires
Miguel Martins Dantas (pt)		13 April 1848 – 7 November 1848	Chargé d'affaires
António Bernardo da Costa Cabral (Conde de Tomar)		8 November 1848 – 4 May 1851	Minister Plenipotentiary, on 8 November 1848 accredited
Luiz Victorino de Noronha		27 July 1851 – 5 August 1852	Minister Plenipotentiary, on 29 July 1851 accredited
José Ferreira Borges de Castro		6 August 1852 – 5 November 1853	Chargé d'affaires
Conde da Azinhaga		6 November 1853 – 22 October 1856	Minister Plenipotentiary, on 6 November 1853 accredited
Luiz Augusto Pinto de Soveral (Marquês de Soveral) (pt)		31 January 1857 – 13 July 1866	Minister Plenipotentiary, on 29 February 1857 accredited
António José de Ávila (Conde D’Ávila)		26 September 1866 – 27 December 1867	Minister Plenipotentiary, on 26 September 1866 accredited
Frederico Francisco de la Figaniére e Mourão (pt)		27 December 1867 – 10 March 1868	Chargé d'affaires
Visconde de Alte		10 March 1868 – 16 November 1869	Minister Plenipotentiary, on 14 March 1868 accredited
João de Andrade Corvo		1869 – 1 June 1870	Minister Plenipotentiary, on 17 November 1869 accredited
Pedro da Costa de Sousa de Macedo (Conde de Vila Franca do Campo) (pt)		18 July 1870 – 31 March 1871	Minister Plenipotentiary, on 1 August 1870 accredited
Guilherme Street de Arriaga e Cunha		31 March 1871 – 18 December 1871	Chargé d'affaires
José da Silva Mendes Leal (pt)		18 December 1871 – 13 April 1874	Minister Plenipotentiary, on 18 December 1871 accredited
Miguel Martins Dantas		21 September 1874 – 14 February 1977	Minister Plenipotentiary, on 24 September 1874 accredited
José Maria do Casal Ribeiro (Conde do Casal Ribeiro) (pt)		20 March 1875 – April 1875	Minister Plenipotentiary on a Special Mission, on 22 March 1875 accredited
Joaquim Tomás Lobo de Ávila (Conde de Valbom) (pt)		15 February 1877 – 2 April 1979	Minister Plenipotentiary, on 15 February 1877 accredited
Guilherme Street de Arriaga e Cunha		2 April 1979 – 31 July 1879	Chargé d'affaires
José Maria do Casal Ribeiro (Conde do Casal Ribeiro)		31 July 1879 – 1 October 1881	Minister Plenipotentiary, on 18 August 1879 accredited
João de Andrade Corvo		6 October 1881 – 28 June 1883	Minister Plenipotentiary
José da Silva Mendes Leal		16 August 1883 – 3 July 1886	Minister Plenipotentiary, on 16 August 1883 accredited
José Maria do Casal Ribeiro (Conde do Casal Ribeiro)		20 November 1886 – 28 September 1891	Minister Plenipotentiary, on 22 November 1886 accredited
Miguel Aleixo António do Carmo de Noronha (Conde de Paraty) (pt)		16 March 1892 – 15 July 1892	Chargé d'affaires
José Manuel de Noronha e Brito de Menezes de Alarcão (Conde de São Miguel)		15 July 1892 – 27 November 1893	Minister Plenipotentiary, on 16 July 1892 accredited
Henrique de Macedo Pereira Coutinho (Conde de Macedo) (pt)		4 December 1893 – 18 September 1902	Minister Plenipotentiary, on 14 December 1893 accredited
António Maria Tovar de Lemos Pereira (Conde de Tovar) (pt)		13 October 1902 – 5 October 1910	Minister Plenipotentiary, on 16 October 1902 accredited
Portugal
Francisco de Oliveira Calheiros e Menezes		5 October 1910 – 11 April 1911	Chargé d'affaires
Augusto César de Almeida Vasconcelos Correia		11 April 1911 – 12 October 1911	Minister Plenipotentiary
José Relvas		19 October 1911 – 13 January 1914	Minister Plenipotentiary, on 30 October 1911 accredited
Armando Navarro		13 January 1914 – 13 August 1914	Chargé d'affaires
Augusto de Vasconcelos		13 August 1914 – 3 March 1918	Minister Plenipotentiary, on 29 August 1914 accredited
António Caetano de Abreu Freire Egas Moniz		4 March 1918 – 10 October 1918	Minister Plenipotentiary
Vasco Francisco Caetano de Quevedo		10 October 1918 – 15 February 1919	Chargé d'affaires
Manuel Teixeira Gomes		15 February 1919 – 24 April 1919	Minister Plenipotentiary, on 23 February 1919 accredited
Francisco Manuel Couceiro da Costa (pt)		14 May 1919 – 17 May 1921	Minister Plenipotentiary, on 27 May 1919 accredited
Vasco Francisco Caetano de Quevedo		17 May 1921 – 8 May 1922	Chargé d'affaires
João Carlos de Melo Barreto (pt)		8 May 1922 – 19 June 1926	Minister Plenipotentiary, on 16 May 1922 accredited
João Carlos de Melo Barreto		19 June 1926 – 26 January 1935	Re-accredited as Ambassador on 14 October 1926; the Legation was elevated to Embassy in June 1926
José Mendes de Vasconcelos Guimarãe (Riba Tâmega)		27 January 1935 – 23 December 1936	Chargé d'affaires
Pedro Teotónio Pereira		18 January 1938 – 16 June 1938	Special agent on a special mission with the civil war government of General Franco
Pedro Teotónio Pereira		16 June 1938 – 10 October 1945	Ambassador at the Portuguese Embassy in San Sebastian, on 25 June 1938 accredited
Manuel Antas de Oliveira		10 October 1945 – 1 April 1946	Chargé d'affaires at the Portuguese Embassy reestablished in Madrid
António Faria Carneiro Pacheco (pt)		1 April 1946 – 19 January 1954	Ambassador, on 25 April 1946 accredited
José Nosolini Pinto Osório da Silva Leitão		21 February 1954 – 4 January 1959	Ambassador, on 4 March 1954 accredited
Luis Jorge da Costa		4 January 1959 – 11 July 1959	Chargé d'affaires
Venâncio Augusto Deslandes (pt)		11 July 1959 – 11 June 1961	Ambassador, on 13 July 1959 accredited
Luis da Câmara Pinto Coelho (pt)		21 September 1961 – 9 October 1968	Ambassador, on 6 October 1961 accredited
Manuel Farrajota Rocheta		7 December 1868 – 6 August 1974	Ambassador, on 19 December 1968 accredited
Amândio Mourão de Mendonça Côrte-Real da Silva Pinto		6 August 1974 – 2 November 1974	Chargé d'affaires
José Eduardo de Meneses Rosa		2 November 1974 – 4 June 1977	Ambassador, on 14 November 1974 accredited
Victor José da Costa da Cunha Rego (pt)		8 June 1977 – 14 December 1979	Ambassador, on 21 June 1977 accredited
Manuel Barreiros Martins		14 December 1979 – 23 April 1980	Chargé d'affaires
João de Sá Coutinho Rebelo Sotto Maior		24 April 1980 – 8 March 1984	Ambassador, on 21 May 1980 accredited
João Carlos Lopes Cardoso de Freitas Cruz (pt)		15 March 1984 – 30 December 1984	Ambassador, on 26 April 1984 accredited
Gonçalo Aires de Santa Clara Gomes (pt)		30 December 1984 – 19 February 1985	Chargé d'affaires
Fernando José Reino		19 February 1985 – 21 June 1988	Ambassador, on 21 February 1985 accredited
José César Paulouro das Neves		26 June 1988 – 10 July 1990	Ambassador, on 3 July 1988 accredited
Carlos Alberto Soares Simões Coelho		11 July 1990 – 4 October 1993	Ambassador, on 18 September 1990 accredited
Leonardo Charles de Zaffiri Duarte Mathias (pt)		13 October 1993 – 29 April 1999	Ambassador, on 4 November 1993 accredited
António Manuel de Mendonça Martins da Cruz (pt)		12 May 1999 – 4 April 2002	Ambassador, on 22 June 1999 accredited
João da Rosa Lã (de)		29 July 2002 – 21 October 2004	Ambassador
José Filipe Moraes Cabral		28 October 2004 – 30 October 2008	Ambassador
Álvaro José Costa de Mendonça e Moura		11 November 2008 – 14 April 2013	Ambassador
José Tadeu da Costa Soares		5 April 2013 –14 October 2014	Ambassador, on 4 September 2013 accredited
Francisco Pimentel de Mello Ribeiro de Menezes		December 2014 –January 2020	Ambassador, on 8 January 2015 accredited
João Mira Gomes		February 2020 –2025	
José Augusto Duarte		since 4 April 2025	

== See also ==
Portugal–Spain relations
