= José Nunes Liberato =

Portuguese politician (born 1951)

Chief of the Civilian House
- In office 9 March 2006 – 9 March 2016
- President: Aníbal Cavaco Silva
- Preceded by: José Bonifácio Serra
- Succeeded by: Fernando Frutuoso de Melo

Secretary-General of the Social Democratic Party
- In office 15 November 1992 – 19 February 1995
- President: Aníbal Cavaco Silva
- Preceded by: José Falcão e Cunha
- Succeeded by: Eduardo Azevedo Soares

Member of the Assembly of the Republic
- In office 27 October 1995 – 24 October 1999
- Constituency: Leiria
- In office 4 November 1991 – 26 October 1995
- Constituency: Castelo Branco

Personal details
- Born: José Manuel Nunes Liberato; 16 August 1951 (age 74) Lisbon, Portugal
- Party: Social Democratic Party
- Occupation: Politician
- Profession: Economist

José Manuel Nunes Liberato (born 16 August 1951) is a Portuguese politician and economist who served as Chief of the Civilian House of President Aníbal Cavaco Silva from 2006 until 2016. He also served as Secretary-general of the Social Democratic Party from 1992 until 1995, and as a member of the Assembly of the Republic from 1991 until 1999.

== Biography ==
Nunes Liberato was born in Lisbon, in 1951, studying economics in the Higher Institute of Economic and Financial Sciences of the Technical University of Lisbon.

From 1979 until 1984, he was a part of the regional government of the Azores under João Bosco Mota Amaral, as Regional Under Secretary for Planning.

In 1985, he was invited to join Aníbal Cavaco Silva's first government as Secretary of State for Local Administration and Spacial Planning.

In 1992, following a party congress that re-elected Cavaco Silva as the President of the party, Nunes Liberato was elected as Secretary-general of the party, the second-in-command. After his election, he resigned as secretary of state and assumed his office as a member of the Assembly of the Republic, to which he was elected in the 1991 legislative election.

Following Cavaco Silva's departure from the leadership of the party, he was succeeded in the post of Secretary-general of the party by Eduardo Azevedo Soares, staying in parliament until 1999.

Following Cavaco Silva's election as President in 2006, Nunes Liberato was appointed as his Chief of the Civilian House, staying in office throughout both terms until 2016.

In 2024, he became the President of the Portuguese Center for Foundations.

He was appointed as Chancellor of the National Orders by President António José Seguro in 2026, succeeding Manuela Ferreira Leite.
