= Teresa Caeiro =

Portuguese politician (1969–2025)

Vice President of the Assembly of the Republic
- In office 15 October 2009 – 25 October 2019
- President: Jaime Gama; Assunção Esteves; Eduardo Ferro Rodrigues

Member of the Assembly of the Republic
- In office 10 March 2005 – 25 October 2019
- Constituency: Leiria (2005–2009); Lisbon (2009–2015); Faro (2015–2019)
- In office 4 April 2002 – 12 September 2003
- Constituency: Lisbon

Secretary of State for Arts and Performances
- In office 17 July 2004 – 10 March 2005
- Prime Minister: Pedro Santana Lopes

Secretary of State for Social Security
- In office 12 September 2003 – 17 July 2004
- Prime Minister: José Durão Barroso

Personal details
- Born: Teresa Margarida de Figueiredo de Vasconcelos Caeiro; 14 February 1969 Lisbon, Portugal
- Died: 14 August 2025 (aged 56) Lisbon, Portugal
- Party: CDS – People's Party (1997–2025)
- Spouse: Miguel Sousa Tavares (m. 2011; div. 2017)
- Children: 1
- Relatives: Mário Cesariny de Vasconcelos (great-uncle)
- Education: University of Lisbon
- Occupation: Lawyer • Translator • Politician
- Awards: Order of Merit of the Federal Republic of Germany (2009)

Teresa Margarida de Figueiredo de Vasconcelos Caeiro (14 February 1969 – 14 August 2025) was a Portuguese lawyer and politician.

== Early life ==
Teresa Margarida de Figueiredo de Vasconcelos Caeiro was born in the Portuguese capital of Lisbon on 14 February 1969. She was the daughter and granddaughter of naval officers, her father being a rear admiral and his father an admiral. His uncle Mário Cesariny de Vasconcelos was a Portuguese surrealist poet and painter. As a child she lived in several countries, including Cape Verde and Belgium, where she lived between the ages of 9 and 19, following her father in his work. She graduated in law from the Faculty of Law of the University of Lisbon, and did an internship at a legal company between 1993 and 1995. Then she worked as a freelance translator at the Court of Justice of the European Union and at the European General Court from 1996 to 1999. Between 1998 and 1999, she was also a lawyer at Portugália Airlines.

== Political career ==
A member of the Christian democratic CDS – People's Party (CDS-PP), Caeiro had her first active political experience as a member of the parish assembly of Mercês in Lisbon, between 1997 and 2001. In the late 1990s she was asked to be the legal advisor to the parliamentary group of the CDS-PP, in the Assembly of the Republic. She later became the chief of staff for the same CDS-PP parliamentary group.

In the 2002 legislative elections the CDS-PP included Caeiro on the Lisbon constituency list of candidates to be a deputy in the Assembly of the Republic. Although she was elected, she did not take office as she was appointed to the post of civil governor of Lisbon, on 14 May 2002. In September 2003, however, she left the post in Lisbon to become Secretary of State for Social Security in the coalition government of the Social Democratic Party and CDS-PP, under the prime minister José Manuel Barroso. In 2004, under the new prime minister, Pedro Santana Lopes, she was appointed Secretary of State for Arts and Performances. In 2005 she was again elected to the National Assembly as a candidate on the CDS-PP list for the Leiria constituency. She was re-elected in 2009 and 2011, for the Lisbon constituency and again in 2015, for the Faro constituency.

Caeiro was involved with a charitable organization called Raríssimas, that aimed to help people with rare mental illnesses. In 2019, the founder and president was taken to court by the charity to obtain repayment of over €380,000 of funds, said to have been used inappropriately. Caeiro had been a member of the governing body at the time, although the extent of her actual involvement with the charity was disputed.

== Personal life and death ==
Caeiro became an unmarried mother at the age of 37, having a son with a professor, Vasco Rato. In 2011 she married the journalist and writer, Miguel Sousa Tavares, in what was his fourth marriage. They separated in September 2017.

Caeiro died on 14 August 2025, at the age of 56.
