= Chief of the Civilian House =

Portuguese administrative office

- Incumbent; Cláudia Ribeiro since 9 March 2026
- Civilian House of the Presidency
- Reports to: President of Portugal
- Appointer: President of Portugal
- Formation: 1976
- First holder: Henrique Granadeiro
- Website: www.presidencia.pt

The Chief of the Civilian House (Portuguese: Chefe da Casa Civil) is the chief of staff to the Presidency of the Portuguese Republic. This post was established in 1976, under the presidency of António Ramalho Eanes. The Civilian House also integrates advisors and secretaries, as well as a body of consultants responsible for advising the President in several areas.

The current Chief of Staff of President António José Seguro is Cláudia Ribeiro since 9 March 2026.

== List of chiefs of the Civilian House ==
No.	Chief of Staff	Took office	Left office	Time in office	President
1	Henrique Granadeiro (b. 1943)	14 September 1976	15 April 1979	2 years, 213 days	António Ramalho Eanes
–	Vacant office	15 April 1979	7 March 1980	327 days	António Ramalho Eanes
2	Fernando Reino (1929–2018)	7 March 1980	15 August 1981	1 year, 161 days	António Ramalho Eanes
3	José Caldeira Guimarães (?–?)	15 August 1981	9 March 1986	4 years, 206 days	António Ramalho Eanes
4	Alfredo Barroso (b. 1945)	9 March 1986	9 March 1996	10 years, 0 days	Mário Soares
5	António Franco (1944–2020)	9 March 1996	9 March 2001	5 years, 0 days	Jorge Sampaio
6	José Filipe Moraes Cabral (b. 1950)	9 March 2001	27 October 2004	3 years, 232 days	Jorge Sampaio
7	João Bonifácio Serra (1949–2023)	27 October 2004	9 March 2006	1 year, 133 days	Jorge Sampaio
8	José Nunes Liberato (b. 1951)	9 March 2006	9 March 2016	10 years, 0 days	Aníbal Cavaco Silva
9	Fernando Frutuoso de Melo (b. 1955)	9 March 2016	9 March 2026	10 years, 0 days	Marcelo Rebelo de Sousa
10	Cláudia Ribeiro (b. ?)	9 March 2026	Incumbent	183 days	António José Seguro
