= Miguel Sousa Tavares =

Portuguese journalist and writer (born 1952)

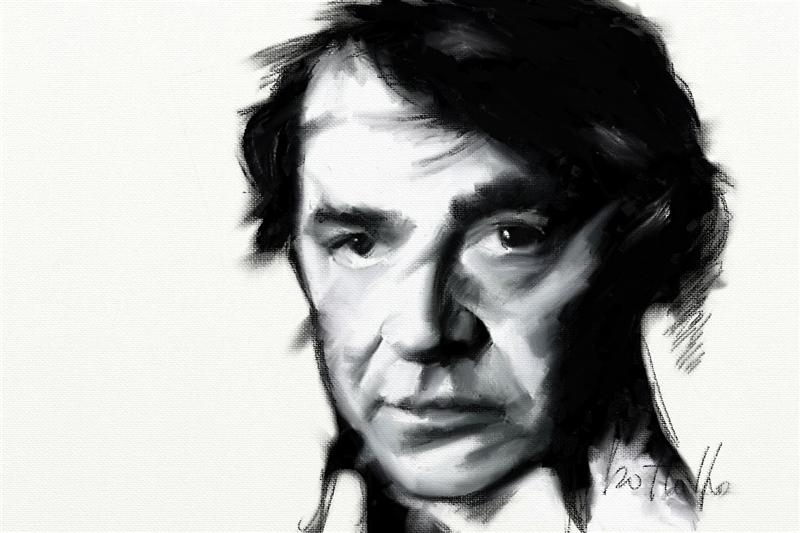
- Born: 25 June 1952 (age 74) Porto, Portugal
- Occupation: Journalist; writer; pundit
- Notable works: Equator (2003)
- Spouses: Mariana Bustorff Silva (m. 1973, divorced) Laurinda Alves (divorced) Cristina Moreira (m. 2003; div. 2009) Teresa Caeiro (m. 2011; div. 2017)
- Children: 3
- Relatives: Sophia de Mello Breyner Andresen (mother)

Miguel Andresen de Sousa Tavares (born 25 June 1952) is a Portuguese journalist, writer and pundit.

The son of poet Sophia de Mello Breyner Andresen and lawyer and politician Francisco Sousa Tavares, Miguel received his education in Law, eventually pursuing careers in journalism and essay writing for which he became known. His literary fiction debut Equador, based on the life of a Portuguese governor of São Tomé e Príncipe, was one of the best-selling books of 2003 in Portugal, with over 220,000 copies sold. He has also published some best-selling books for children. He currently writes a weekly column of political commentary for Expresso (as he previously did for Público), and contributes to the sports newspaper A Bola. His passion for football is well known, and he is a keen FC Porto supporter. He is usually seen as a right winger in politics, advocating for union busting of Comboios de Portugal in an oped.

== Personal life ==
He first married in Estoril on 7 April 1973 and divorced Mariana Espírito Santo Bustorff Silva (Lisbon, São Sebastião da Pedreira, 9 December 1951 - 1 January 2001), daughter of António Sérgio Carneiro Bustorff Silva and wife Ana Maria da Anunciação de Fátima (de Morais Sarmento) Cohen do Espírito Santo Silva (daughter of Ricardo Espírito Santo and whose maternal grandfather was Sephardi Jewish), and has two children: Pedro Bustorff (Silva) de Sousa Tavares (born 17 April 1975), who by Sofia Barciela Borges has a son Miguel Barciela de Sousa Tavares (born Lisbon, 10 December 2007); and Rita Bustorff (Silva) de Sousa Tavares (born Lisbon, 19 May 1978), wife in 2002 of her cousin Ricardo Espírito Santo Bastos Salgado, son of Ricardo Salgado and wife Maria João Leal Calçada Bastos, by whom she has one son and two daughters.

He married secondly and divorced Laurinda Alves Nunes Fernandes (born 1 December 1962), fellow journalist and head of list candidate for the Hope for Portugal Movement to the 2009 European Parliament election in Portugal, daughter of José Nunes Fernandes and wife Helena Maria Alves, by whom he has a son: Martim Alves Andresen de Sousa Tavares (born Lisbon, 1991).

He divorced for the third and alone since 2009 Cristina Pinto Basto Avides Moreira, daughter of Miguel de Viveiros Avides Moreira and wife Helena Elisabeth Júlia Ferreira Pinto Basto (Noblemen of Coat of Arms), without issue. Miguel Sousa Tavares invested in Espírito Santo Group about two million euros in participation units of the ES Liquidez fund, in a total of five bank movements made throughout the year 2013. Sousa Tavares did not know. "I have never, with my knowledge or authorization, been an investor in BES and GES products."
