= Vasco da Gama Fernandes =

Portuguese lawyer and politician

His Excellency Vasco da Gama Fernandes GCC GCL

1st President of the Assembly of the Republic
- In office 29 July 1976 – 29 October 1978
- Succeeded by: Teófilo Carvalho dos Santos

Vice-President of the Constituent Assembly
- In office 2 June 1975 – 2 April 1976

Personal details
- Born: 4 November 1908 São Vicente, Portuguese Cape Verde
- Died: 9 August 1991 (aged 82) Lisbon, Portugal
- Spouse: Maria da Glória Ramos de Ataíde Fernandes
- Education: University of Lisbon
- Profession: Lawyer

Vasco da Gama Fernandes GCC GCL (4 November 1908 – 9 August 1991) was a Portuguese lawyer and politician.

== Career ==
Vasco da Gama Fernandes was licensee in Law, from the faculty of Law of the University of Lisbon, and became a lawyer and politician. Distinguished as an opposition figure to the Estado Novo, after being arrested for several times by the political police (PIDE), he joined the Aliança Republicana e Socialista (ARS) and later to the Movimento de Unidade Nacional Antifascista (MUNAF). In 1945, he was one of the founders of the Movimento de Unidade Democrática (MUD), and also of the Partido Trabalhista in 1947 and the Socialist Party (PS) in 1973.

After the Carnation Revolution, he was elected a deputy and vice-president of the Constituent Assembly for PS and, when reelected to the Assembly of the Republic, he also became its 1st President from 29 July 1976 to 29 October 1978, also becoming inherently a member of the Portuguese Council of State.

In 1979, he resigned from PS, he would then join the Frente Republicana e Socialista (FRS) and later founded the Democratic Renovator Party (PRD). He was elected deputy again under this party in the legislative elections of 1985 and 1987.
