= Francisco de Oliveira Dias =

Portuguese politician (1930–2019)

President of the Assembly of the Republic
- In office 22 October 1981 – 2 November 1982
- Preceded by: Leonardo Ribeiro de Almeida
- Succeeded by: Leonardo Ribeiro de Almeida

Personal details
- Born: Francisco Manuel Lopes Vieira de Oliveira Dias; 17 February 1930 Leiria, Portugal
- Died: 14 January 2019 (aged 88) Lisbon, Portugal
- Party: CDS – People's Party
- Occupation: Politician

Francisco Manuel Lopes Vieira de Oliveira Dias (17 February 1930 – 14 January 2019) was a Portuguese politician.

== Career ==
He was a collaborator of the Founders of then Democratic and Social Center (CDS), and occupied many offices in this Party.

In 1974 he was elected a Deputy to the Constituent Assembly and in 1976 to the Assembly of the Republic, where he was successively elected until 1983.

He was the 4th President of the Assembly of the Republic between 22 October 1981 and 2 November 1982, during which he was also a Member of the Portuguese Council of State.

He was also a Member of the Parliamentary Assembly of the European Council and of its Commission of Education and Culture.

He died on 14 January 2019, aged 88.

== Family ==
He was son of Francisco António do Amaral Dias, a Medical Doctor, and wife Maria Isabel Charters Lopes Vieira da Câmara de Oliveira (born 1904), of English descent, related to the 1st Viscounts of São Sebastião.

He married Maria das Mercês Coelho da Silva Gil, daughter of Adelino da Silva Gil (1885–1935) and wife Deolinda Duarte Coelho (1887–1955), and had eleven children:

- Maria Isabel Gil de Oliveira Dias
- Francisco Maria Gil de Oliveira Dias
- Paulo Gil de Oliveira Dias
- João Manuel Gil de Oliveira Dias
- José Pedro Gil de Oliveira Dias
- Maria das Mercês Gil de Oliveira Dias
- Nuno Gil de Oliveira Dias
- Miguel Gil de Oliveira Dias
- Maria do Carmo Gil de Oliveira Dias
- Marta Maria Gil de Oliveira Dias
- Maria Madalena Gil de Oliveira Dias
