= Henrique de Barros =

Portuguese politician

Henrique Teixeira de Queirós de Barros (7 October 1904, in Coimbra – 21 August 2000) was a Portuguese politician.

== Background ==
Henrique was the son of João de Barros and his wife Raquel Teixeira de Queirós, and a paternal grandson of the 1st Viscount of Marinha Grande, of whom he was the representative. He was also a brother-in-law of Marcelo Caetano, the Prime Minister of Portugal during the final years of the Dictatorship.

== Career ==
Henrique was a Licentiate in agricultural economics from the Instituto Superior de Agronomia of the University of Lisbon, and from there he developed an intense activity as a pedagogue and an Investigator.

In opposition to the dictatorial regime of Estado Novo from a young age, he joined the Movimento de Unidade Democrática (MUD) in 1945. He joined the Socialist Party in 1974, and a year later he was elected a Deputy to the Constituent Assembly, of which he became the 1st and only President from 3 June 1975 to 2 April 1976. With this, his name got permanently connected with the Constitution of Portugal of 1976.

He then served as minister of state of the First Constitutional Government and a member of the Portuguese Council of State.

In 1981 he disconnected from PS and, from 1985, he started collaborating with the Democratic Renovator Party (PRD).

== Family ==
He married Luísa de Morais Sarmento, from an ancient noble family of Trás os Montes e Alto Douro, without issue.
