= Jaime Gama =

Portuguese politician (born 1947)

His Excellency Jaime Gama GCC GCIH GCL
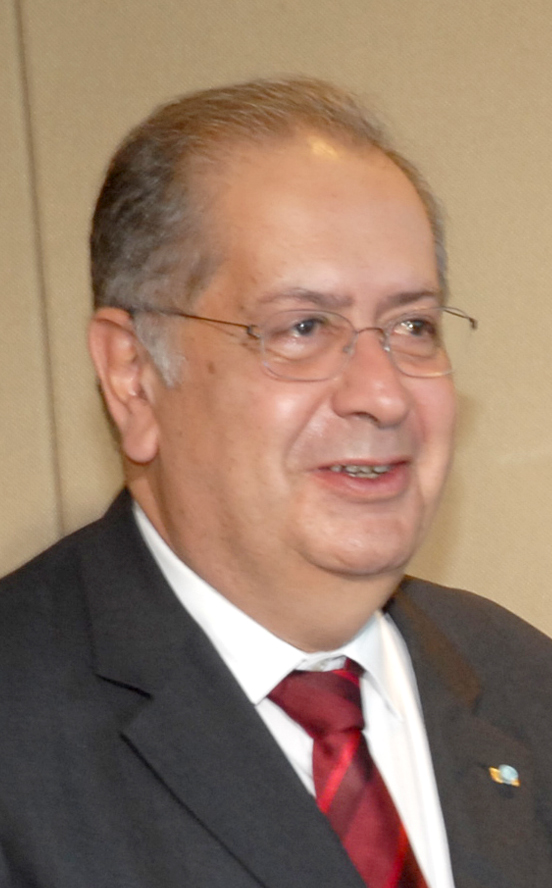
- Gama in 2008

President of the Assembly of the Republic
- In office 16 March 2005 – 19 June 2011
- Preceded by: Mota Amaral
- Succeeded by: Maria da Assunção Esteves

Chancellor of the Ancient Military Orders
- In office 14 March 2016 – 20 July 2026
- President: Marcelo Rebelo de Sousa; António José Seguro
- Preceded by: Vasco Rocha Vieira
- Succeeded by: Guilherme d'Oliveira Martins

Minister of Foreign Affairs
- In office 28 October 1995 – 6 April 2002
- Prime Minister: António Guterres
- Preceded by: José Manuel Barroso
- Succeeded by: Teresa Gouveia
- In office 9 June 1983 – 6 November 1985
- Prime Minister: Mário Soares
- Preceded by: Vasco Futscher Pereira
- Succeeded by: Pedro Pires de Miranda

Minister of National Defence
- In office 29 May 1999 – 25 October 1999
- Prime Minister: António Guterres
- Preceded by: José Veiga Simão
- Succeeded by: Júlio Castro Caldas

Minister of the Internal Administration
- In office 27 February 1978 – 29 August 1978
- Prime Minister: Mário Soares
- Preceded by: Alberto Oliveira e Silva
- Succeeded by: António Gonçalves Ribeiro

Member of the Assembly of the Republic
- In office 31 May 1983 – 19 June 2011
- Constituency: Lisbon
- In office 3 June 1976 – 30 May 1983
- Constituency: Azores

Personal details
- Born: 8 June 1947 (age 79) Senhora da Rosa, Fajã de Baixo, Portugal
- Party: Socialist Party
- Spouse: Alda Taborda
- Children: 1
- Education: University of Lisbon
- Profession: Philosopher, university professor, journalist
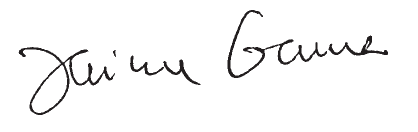
- Signature
- Website: Official website

Jaime José de Matos da Gama GCC GCIH GCL (born 8 June 1947) is a Portuguese former politician. In the Portuguese government, he served as Minister of Internal Administration in 1978, Minister of Foreign Affairs from 1983 to 1985 and from 1995 to 2002, and Minister of National Defence in 1999. From 2005 to 2011 he was President of the Assembly of the Republic.

Since leaving politics, he has worked as Senior Strategic Counsel at the Albright Stonebridge Group, a global strategy and business advisory firm, and as chairman of the bank Novo Banco dos Açores.

== Background ==
Born at Senhora da Rosa, in the Azores' Fajã de Baixo parish in 1947, he is a son of Jaime da Rosa Ferreira da Gama (Matriz, Horta, Faial, Azores, January 1914 – Lisbon, 29 July 2003) and wife Lucília Vaz do Rego de Matos (São Sebastião, Ponta Delgada, São Miguel, Azores, 12 September 1916 – Hospital Militar, Estrela, Lisbon, 21 September 1987).

== Political life ==
He graduated as a Licentiate in philosophy from the Faculty of Letters of the University of Lisbon. He was involved in the opposition to the fascist Estado Novo (New State) regime, since his youth, and was first arrested, aged only 18, due to an article published in the local press. He was a member of the socialist Electoral Commission for Democratic Unity in the campaign for the 1969 legislative elections, won by the ruling Nationaal Union party, due to massive fraud. He was a journalist of the opposition newspaper República, in the last years of the fascist regime.

He was a founder of the Socialist Party, in the German exile of Bad-Munstereifel. He was elected for his party as a Deputy to the Assembly of the Republic for the Azores from 1975 and for Lisbon from 1983.

In the 1st Constitutional Government, he was Minister of Internal Affairs (1978), and Minister of Foreign Affairs in the 9th Constitutional Government, from 1983 to 1985. He returned to the same ministry, in António Guterres' governments, from 1995 to 2002, and was also Minister of National Defence, in 1999, and Minister of State from 1999 to 2002.

He was President of the United Nations Security Council during June 1998. He was the chairman of the Presidency of the Council of Europe from 1 January 2002 until 6 April 2002, when he lost his post as Foreign Minister when the new government of José Manuel Durão Barroso took office in Portugal.

From 2005 to 2011, he was President of the Assembly of the Republic.

== Foreign policy ==
As Minister of Foreign Affairs, Jaime Gama signed the Accession Treaty of Portugal to the European Communities, the Friendship, Cooperation and Consultation Treaty with Brazil, and initiated and concluded negotiations with China on the handover of Macau. He negotiated and signed the New York Agreements between the UN, Indonesia, and Portugal that led to the self-determination and independence of East Timor. On several occasions, he managed crisis and peace and reconciliation efforts in Angola, Mozambique, and Guinea-Bissau. Jaime Gama was the Portuguese Minister of Foreign Affairs in 2002 when Angola reached peace after a 27-year civil war.

Jaime Gama proposed, negotiated and launched the Community of Portuguese Language Countries (CPLP).

As Foreign Minister he proposed and organized, with Algeria and Egypt, the first Africa-EU Summit, paving the way for the Africa-EU Partnership. As Speaker of the Parliament he negotiated and implemented the Parliamentary Forum of the Ibero-American Community of Nations.

== Life after politics ==
Jaime Gama is Senior Strategic Counsel at the Albright Stonebridge Group, a global strategy and business advisory firm led by former U.S. Secretary of State in the Clinton administration Madeleine Albright and former Commerce Secretary and Kellogg Company CEO Carlos Gutierrez.

Presently, he is a member of the General Council of the University of Lisbon, of the supervisory board and of the Strategy Board of the Political Studies Institute, both of the Lisbon Catholic University, of the European Council on Foreign Relations and of the Aspen Ministers Forum.

In addition, he was the chairman of the Board of Directors of the bank Novo Banco dos Açores, is chairman of the supervisory board for the electronic newspaper "Observador" and a member of the Board of Directors of the Francisco Manuel dos Santos Foundation.

== Honours ==
=== National ===
- Grand Cross of the Order of Christ (2 June 1987)
- Grand Cross of the Order of Prince Henry (19 April 1986)
- Grand-Cross of the Order of Liberty (4 October 2004)

=== Foreign ===
- Belgium: Grand Cordon of the Order of Leopold (9 October 2000)
- Chile: Grand Cross of the Order of Merit (30 September 2001)
- Estonia: First Class of the Order of the White Star (29 March 2006)
- France:
  - Grand Officer of the National Order of Legion of Honour, France (29 November 1999)
  - Commander of the National Order of Legion of Honour (28 January 1991)
- Germany: Grand Cross of the Order of Merit of the Federal Republic of Germany (9 May 1989)
- Greece: Grand Cross of the Order of Honour (17 March 2000)
- Holy See: Grand Cross of Order of St. Gregory the Great (3 September 2010)
- Italy: Knight Grand Cross of the Order of Merit of the Italian Republic (1 April 2002)
- Jordan: Grand Cordon of the Order of the Star of Jordan (28 May 2009)
- Morocco: Grand Cordon of the Order of Ouissam Alaouite (6 February 1992)
- Norway: Grand Cross of Royal Norwegian Order of Merit (25 September 2009)
- Poland: Commander's Cross with Star of the Order of Merit of the Republic of Poland (22 September 1997)
- Spain: Grand Cross of the Order of Civil Merit (17 August 1998)
- Uruguay: Medal of the Oriental Republic of Uruguay (12 August 1997)

== Family ==
He married in Lisbon on 18 September 1971 Alda Taborda and their son, João Taborda da Gama, born in 1977, is a Tax Law Professor of the Law School of the Catholic University of Portugal. They have five grandchildren.

Political offices
Preceded by Alberto Oliveira e Silva	Minister of the Internal Administration; 1978	Succeeded by António Gonçalves Ribeiro
Preceded by Vasco Futscher Pereira	Minister of Foreign Affairs; 1983–1985	Succeeded by Pedro Pires de Miranda
Preceded by José Manuel Barroso	Minister of Foreign Affairs; 1995–2002	Succeeded by Teresa Gouveia
Preceded by José Veiga Simão	Minister of National Defence; 1999	Succeeded by Júlio Castro Caldas
Preceded by Mota Amaral	President of the Assembly of the Republic; 2005–2011	Succeeded by Maria da Assunção Esteves
Honorary titles
Preceded by Vasco Rocha Vieira	Chancellor of the Ancient Military Orders; 2016–present	Incumbent
