= António Lopes Cardoso =

Portuguese politician

Minister of Agriculture and Fishing
- In office 1976–1977
- Succeeded by: Álvaro Barreto

Personal details
- Born: 27 March 1933 Praia, Santiago, Cape Verde
- Died: 9 June 2000 (aged 67) Lisbon, Portugal

António Poppe Lopes Cardoso (27 March 1933 – 8 June 2000) was a Portuguese politician.

== Biography ==
He was born in Praia in the island of Santiago, Cape Verde, then a colony of Portugal.

He studied at the High Institute of Agronomy (Instituto Superior de Agronomia), as an opponent of the Estado Novo he was stripped from associative functions.

In 1962, he was captured by PIDE, the secret police force of the Salazar regime, following his participation in the Beja coupe. Not long after, he went to exile first to Paris then to Brazil where he remained until 1971. After this, he returned to Portugal and returned to the institute at which he had previously studied. In 1973, not long after the congress was founded became part of the Socialist Party in which he went to.

During the Constituent Assembly from 1975 to 1976, he was a leader of the parliamentary group of the Socialist Party (PS). He took part in ministries including the Ministry of Agriculture in the Sixth Provisional Government, led by Pinheiro de Azevedo and in the First Constitutional Government headed by Mário Soares.

He opposed the new agrarian regulations of the Socialist Party. As a result, he was removed from his cabinet position, he became an independent deputy. He founded the Worker's Brotherhood, a movement that would lead to a new party, the UEDS (Left Union of Socialist Democracy). In representation since the tiny party, he was elected deputy of the Republican Assembly in the Second Legislature, he was later re-elected, with an independent deputy, newly to the Socialist Party's list.

He was an author of several books and articles on Portuguese agriculture and its political party system.

== Publications ==
- Um ensaio de análise gráfica da influência do meio físico nos resultados económicos da empresa agrícola (Lisbon, 1960).
- A estabilização dos mercados agrícolas e a organização da produção ["The Establishment of Agricultural Markets and Production Organization"] (Lisbon, 1961).
- A região a oeste da Serra dos Candeeiros [A Region West of Serra dos Candeeiros] (Lisbon, Calouste Gulbenkian Foundation, 1961).
- A concentração da actividade agrícola e a integração empresarial ["Concentration on Agricultural Activity and Company Integration"] (Lisbon, Centro de Estudos de Economia Agrária (Agrarian Economic Studies Centre), 1962).
- Luta pela reforma agrária ["Fight for Agrarian Reforms"] (Lisbon, Diabril, 1976).
- A liberdade defende-se construindo o socialismo, o socialismo constrói-se defendendo a liberdade (Beja, Fed. de Beja do Partido Socialista, 1976).
- A nova lei da reforma agrária ["A New Law on Agrarian Reforms"] (Lisbon, Livros Horizonte, 1977).
- Os sistemas eleitorais ["Electoral Systems"] (Lisbon, Salamandra, 1993, ISBN 972-689-046-2).
- Intervenções parlamentares de Lopes Cardoso : testemunho sobre a coerência de um percurso ["Parliamentary Interventions by Lopes Cardoso"] (Lisbon, A.R., 2003, ISBN 972-556-342-5).

Preceded by none	Minister of Agriculture and Fishing; 1976	Succeeded by Álvaro Barreto
