= President of Portugal =

Head of state

President of the Portuguese Republic
- Presidente da República Portuguesa
- Coat of arms used by the presidency

- Presidential standard

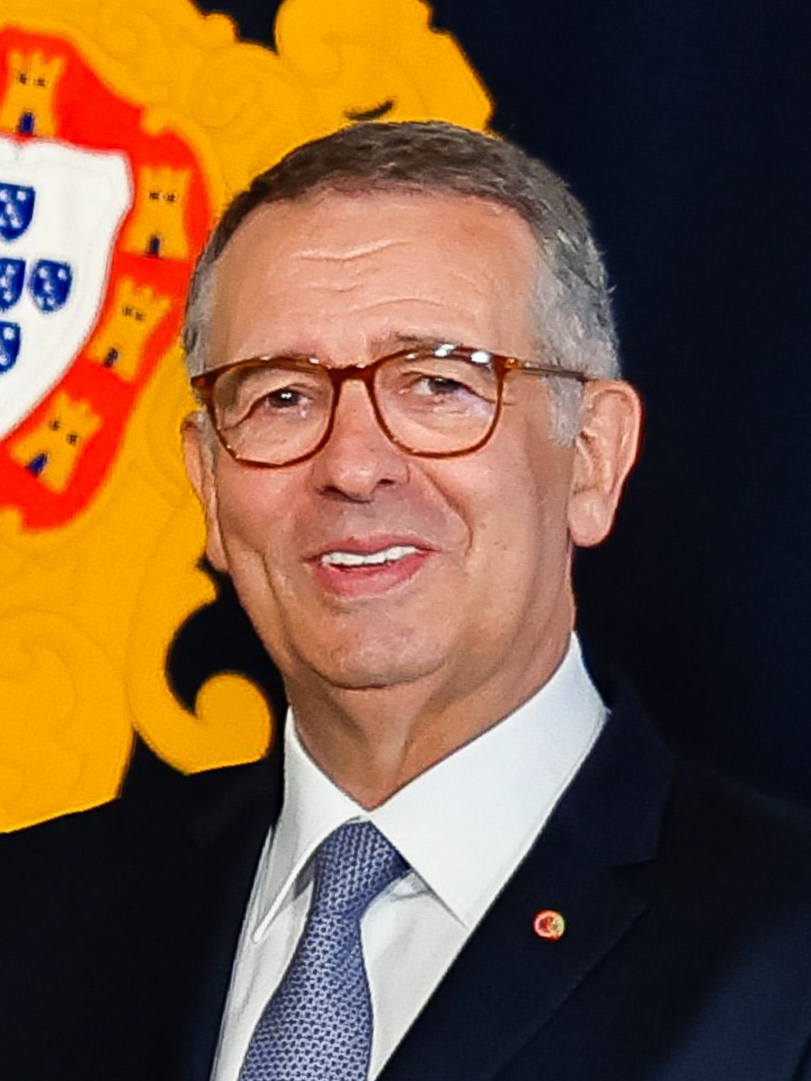
- Incumbent; António José Seguro since 9 March 2026
- Sovereignty body of Portugal; Presidential Office
- Style: Mr. President (informal); His Excellency (diplomatic)
- Type: Head of state; Supreme commander of the armed forces; Grand master of all Portuguese orders
- Abbreviation: PR
- Member of: Council of State; Superior Council of National Defense
- Residence: Belém Palace
- Seat: Lisbon, Portugal
- Appointer: Direct election or via succession
- Term length: Five years; (renewable once consecutively)
- Constituting instrument: Constitution of Portugal (1976)
- Precursor: President of the provisional government
- Formation: 24 August 1911 (115 years ago)
- First holder: Manuel de Arriaga
- Salary: €137,662 annually
- Website: presidencia.pt

The president of Portugal, officially the president of the Portuguese Republic, (Note: Portuguese: Presidente da República Portuguesa, pronounced [pɾɨziˈðẽtɨ ðɐ ʁɛˈpuβlikɐ puɾtuˈɣezɐ]) is the head of state and highest office of Portugal.

The powers, functions and duties of prior presidential offices, and their relation with the prime minister and cabinets have over time differed with the various Portuguese constitutions. Currently, in the Third Republic, a semi-presidential system, the president holds no direct executive power, unlike his counterparts in the United States and France. However, even though he is in general a ceremonial figure, he holds some powers less-commonly found in parliamentary systems: one of his most significant responsibilities is the promulgation of all laws enacted by the Assembly of the Republic (parliament) or the Government (an act without which such laws have no legal validity), with an alternative option to veto them (although this veto can be overcome in the case of laws approved by Parliament) or send them to the Constitutional Court for appreciation of whether they violate the Constitution. This and other abilities imply that the president of Portugal does not fit clearly into either of the three traditional powers – legislative, executive and judicial – acting instead as a sort of "moderating power" among the traditional three.

The current president of Portugal is António José Seguro, who took office on 9 March 2026.

== Role ==
The Portuguese Third Republic is a semi-presidential system. Despite being a rather ceremonial figure, unlike most European presidents, who are largely ceremonial figures, the Portuguese president is vested with more extensive powers. Although the prime minister and parliament oversee and direct much of Portugal's actual governmental affairs, the president wields significant influence and authority, especially in the fields of national security and foreign policy, however, always on the advice of the Government and the approval of Parliament. The president is the supreme commander of the armed forces, holds the nation's most senior office, and outranks all other politicians.

Prior to the Carnation Revolution, the powers of the presidency varied widely; some presidents were virtual dictators (such as Pais, and Carmona in his early years), while others were little more than figureheads (such as Carmona in his later years, Craveiro Lopes, and Américo Tomás). During the Estado Novo, the president was nominally vested with near-dictatorial powers, but in practice supreme power was held by the president of the Council of Ministers (António de Oliveira Salazar and Marcelo Caetano).

=== Government nomination ===
The president's greatest power is their ability to appoint the prime minister. However, since the Assembly of the Republic has the sole power to dismiss the prime minister's government, the prime minister named by the president must have the confidence of a majority of representatives in the assembly, otherwise the prime minister may face a motion of no confidence. The president has the discretionary power to dissolve parliament when he/she sees fit (colloquially known as the "atomic bomb" in Portugal), and President Jorge Sampaio made use of this prerogative in late 2004 to remove the controversial government of Pedro Santana Lopes, despite the absolute majority of deputies supporting the government.

=== Armed Forces ===
In 2003, President Sampaio also intervened to limit the Portuguese participation in the Iraq War – as Supreme Commander of the Armed Forces he forbade the deployment of the Portuguese Army in a war that he personally disagreed with, clashing with the then–prime minister José Manuel Barroso. Because of this, the Government eventually deployed 128 members of the National Republican Guard (GNR) to Iraq from 2003 to 2005, this being possible because the GNR, despite being a military force, was not part of the Armed Forces.

== Powers ==
The constitution grants the following powers to the president:

- The president of the republic exercises the functions of Supreme Commander of the Armed Forces and Grand Master of the Three Orders, and appoints and dismisses, on a proposal from the Government, the chief of the General Staff of the Armed Forces and the heads of General Staff of the three branches of the Armed Forces.
- The president of the republic can dissolve the Assembly of the Republic, which implies the need to call new legislative elections and, after these have been held, the resignation of the Government.
- The president of the republic appoints the prime minister taking into account the electoral results and appoints the remaining members of the Government on the proposal of the prime minister. The president can, on the other hand, dismiss the Government when this becomes necessary to ensure the regular functioning of democratic institutions.
- The governing bodies of the autonomous regions may be dissolved by the president of the republic, for carrying out serious acts contrary to the Constitution.
- The president of the republic declares the state of siege and emergency, after hearing the Government and under authorization from the Assembly of the Republic.
- Upon a proposal from the Government and with authorization from the Assembly of the Republic, the president of the republic may declare war in the event of effective or imminent aggression and make peace.
- The president of the republic promulgates or signs and, consequently, can veto the promulgation or signature of laws, decree-laws, regulatory decrees and other Government decrees.
- In the domain of his competences in international relations, the president of the republic ratifies international treaties.
- The president of the republic decides on the convening of the referendum whose holding is proposed by the Assembly of the Republic.
- The president of the republic may request the Constitutional Court to pre-empt the constitutionality of norms contained in international conventions or decrees that have been sent to him for promulgation as an organic law, law or decree-law.
- The president of the republic appoints and exonerates, in some cases on a proposal from the Government, holders of important state bodies such as the representatives of the Republic for the autonomous regions, the president of the Court of Auditors and the attorney general of the republic, five members of the Council of State and two members of the Superior Council of the Judiciary.
- The president of the Republic appoints the ambassadors and extraordinary envoys, on a proposal from the Government, and accredits the foreign diplomatic representatives.
- The president of the republic, after hearing the Government, pardons and commutes sentences.

== Election ==
Under the Portuguese Constitution adopted in 1976, in the wake of the 1974 Carnation Revolution, the president is elected to a five-year term. In order to be eligible, any citizen has to be of Portuguese origin and above 35 years old. He may be reelected any number of times, but not more than twice in a row. The official residence of the Portuguese president is the Belém Palace in Lisbon.

The president is elected in a two-round system: if no candidate reaches 50% of the votes during the first round, the two candidates with the most votes face each other in a second round held two weeks later. However, the second round have only been needed twice, during the 1986 presidential election and 2026 presidential election. To date, all of the elected presidents since the Carnation Revolution have served for two consecutive terms, and presidents consistently rank as the most popular political figure in the country. During his time in office, however, the popularity of former president Aníbal Cavaco Silva plummeted, making him the second-least popular political figure in the country, just above the then-prime minister, and the first Portuguese president after 1974 to have a negative popularity. By 2024, Marcelo Rebelo de Sousa also displayed negative popularity ratings.

After the election, the President-elect usually takes an office in the Queluz Palace in Sintra (this having been the case for Aníbal Cavaco Silva, Marcelo Rebelo de Sousa and António José Seguro).

=== Succession ===
Under article 132 of the Constitution, if the president dies or becomes incapacitated while in office, the president of the Assembly of the Republic assumes the office with restricted powers until a new president can be inaugurated following fresh elections. In case there's no president of the Assembly to assume the office of President, the regiment of the Assembly of the Republic takes into effect and the vice presidents of the Assembly assume the office by their order and, if none are available, the member of Parliament with the longest tenure assumes the office until the election of a new president of the Assembly.

Since 1976, four Presidents of the Assembly of the Republic have served as interim presidents: Vasco da Gama Fernandes in May 1978, Teófilo Carvalho dos Santos in June 1979, Francisco de Oliveira Dias in December 1981 and António de Almeida Santos in July 1996.

This is the current presidential line of succession of Portugal:

No.	Office	Incumbent	Party
–	President of the Republic	António José Seguro	Socialist
1	President of the Assembly of the Republic	José Pedro Aguiar-Branco	Social Democratic
2	First Vice President of the Assembly	Teresa Morais	Social Democratic
3	Second Vice President of the Assembly	Diogo Pacheco de Amorim	Chega
4	Third Vice President of the Assembly	Marcos Perestrello	Socialist
5	Fourth Vice President of the Assembly	Rodrigo Saraiva	Liberal
6	Longest-serving member of the Assembly	José Cesário	Social Democratic

== President's residence ==
Facade of the Belém Palace

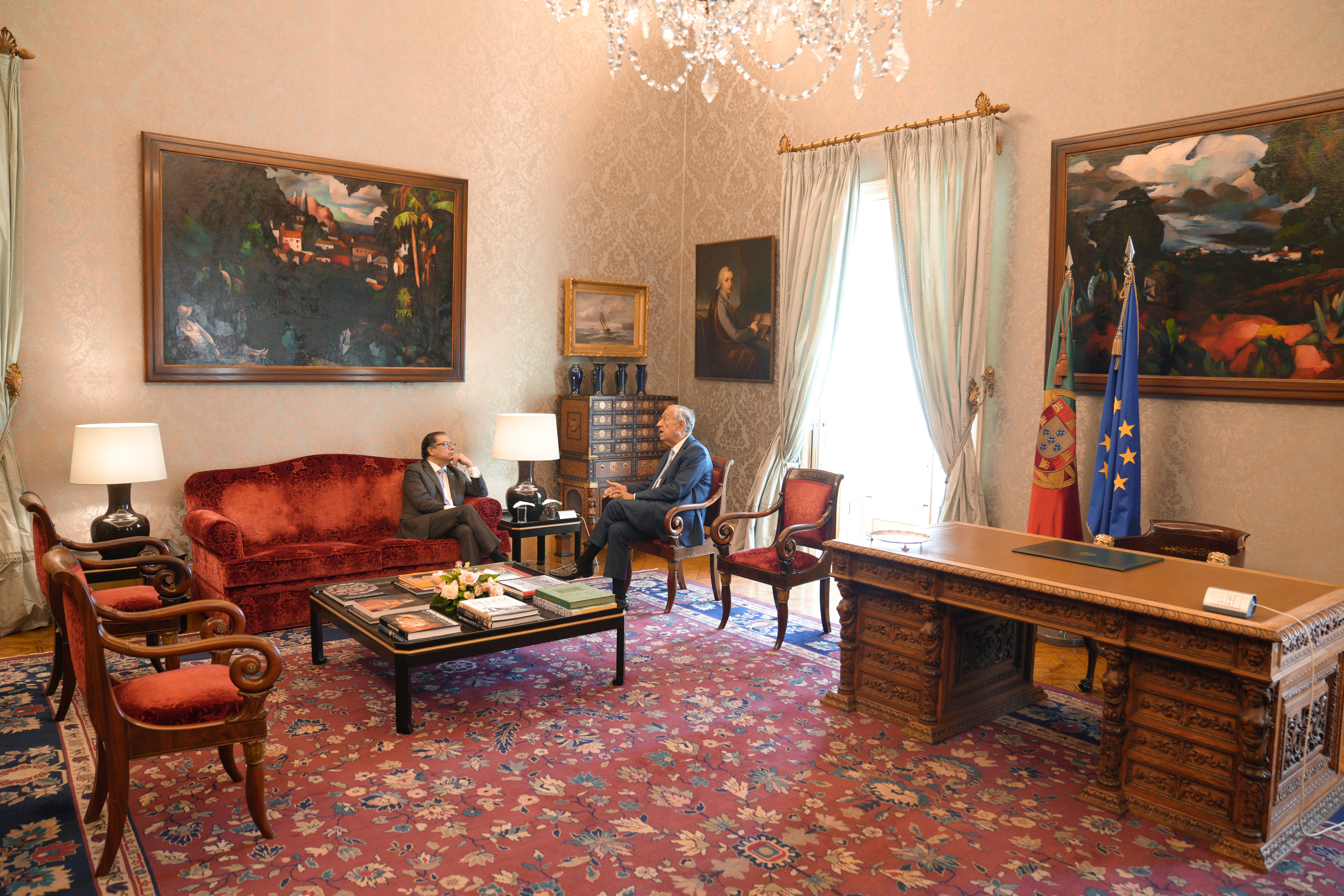
Presidential Office

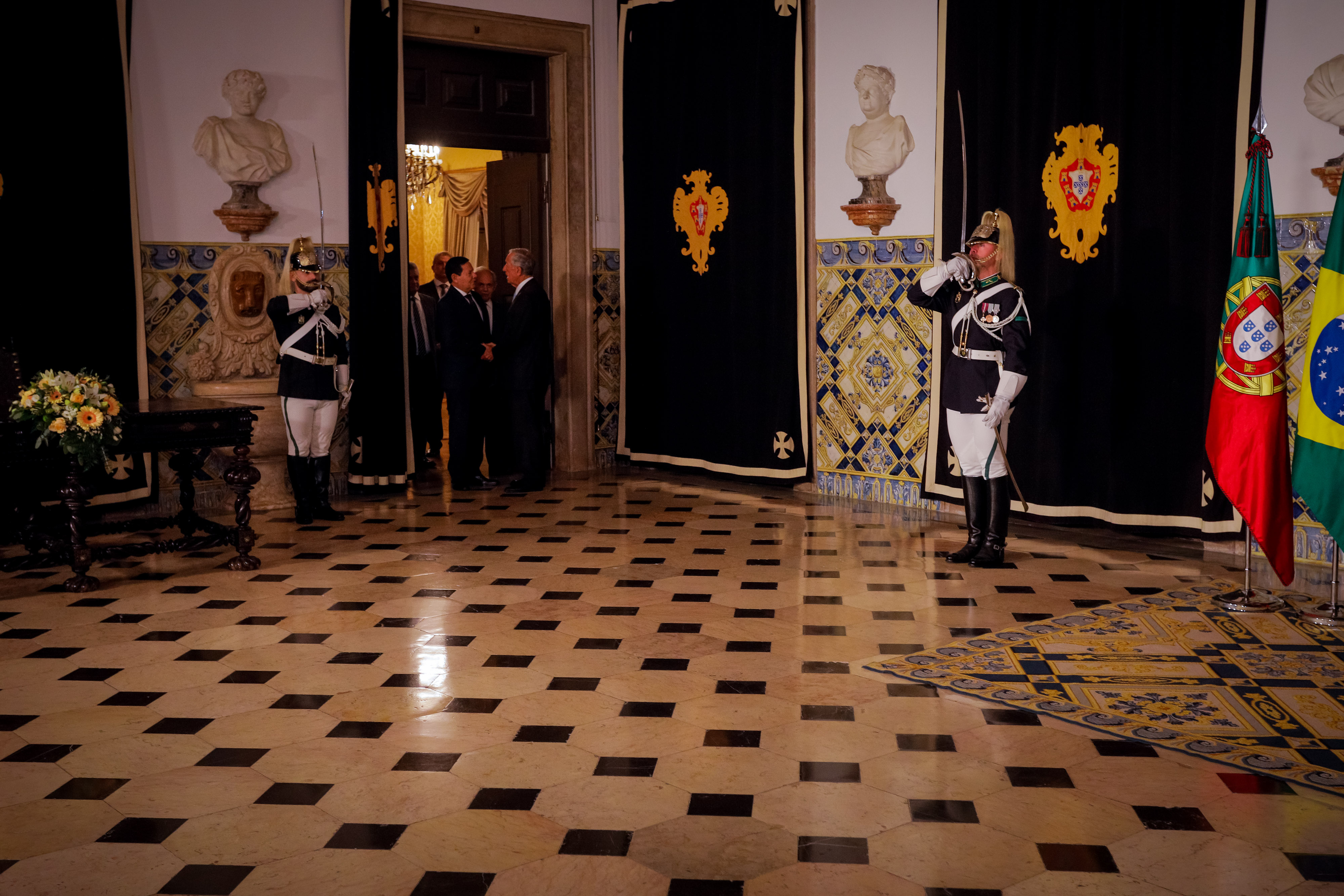
Bicas room

Belém Palace is the official residence of the president of the Portuguese republic since 1910. Built in the 16th century by a high ranking diplomat named Manuel de Portugal, was bought by King John V in the 18th century and served as one of the residences of the Royal Family until the early 20th century.

António José Seguro, the current president, does not live in the palace.

== Last election ==
=== 2026 presidential election ===
Candidate	Party	First round		Second round	
Candidate	Party	Votes	%	Votes	%
António José Seguro	Socialist Party (Note: Also supported by Volt Portugal.)	1,755,563	31.11	3,502,613	66.84
André Ventura	Chega	1,327,021	23.52	1,737,950	33.16
João Cotrim de Figueiredo	Liberal Initiative	903,057	16.00		
Henrique Gouveia e Melo	Independent (Note: Supported by the People's Monarchist Party.)	695,377	12.32		
Luís Marques Mendes	Social Democratic Party (Note: Also supported by CDS – People's Party.)	637,442	11.30		
Catarina Martins	Left Bloc	116,407	2.06		
António Filipe	Portuguese Communist Party (Note: Also supported by the Ecologist Party "The Greens".)	92,644	1.64		
Manuel João Vieira	Independent	60,927	1.08		
Jorge Pinto	LIVRE	38,588	0.68		
André Pestana	Independent (Note: Supported by the Socialist Alternative Movement.)	10,897	0.19		
Humberto Correia	Independent	4,773	0.08		
Total		5,642,696	100.00	5,240,563	100.00
Valid votes		5,642,696	97.82	5,240,563	95.01
Invalid votes		64,565	1.12	98,342	1.78
Blank votes		61,275	1.06	177,072	3.21
Total votes		5,768,536	100.00	5,515,977	100.00
Registered voters/turnout		11,009,803	52.39	11,025,823	50.03
Source: Comissão Nacional de Eleições

== Support Services ==
The Support Services for the Presidency are a group of personal, technical, and asset management, administrative, and financial support services for the Presidency of the Portuguese Republic. The support services are subdivided into Direct Support Services to the President and Management Services, which are as follows:

Service	Chief Executive	Head
Direct Support Services for the President
Civilian House	Chief of the Civilian House	Cláudia Ribeiro
Military House	Chief of the Military House	Paulo Maia Pereira
Security Services
Communications Center
Medical Support Service
Management Services
Board of Directors	Chief of Staff	Cláudia Ribeiro
General Secretariat of the Presidency of the Republic	Secretary-General of the Presidency of the Republic	Ana Cristina Batista
Others
Data Protection Officer

== Travel ==
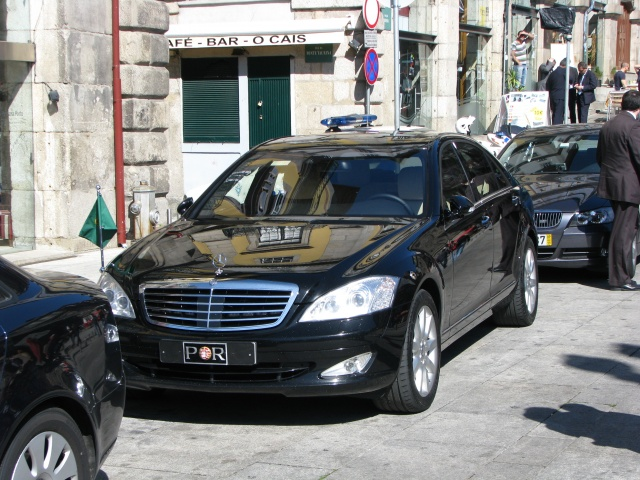
Official Presidential car, model Mercedes-Benz S-Class during 2010

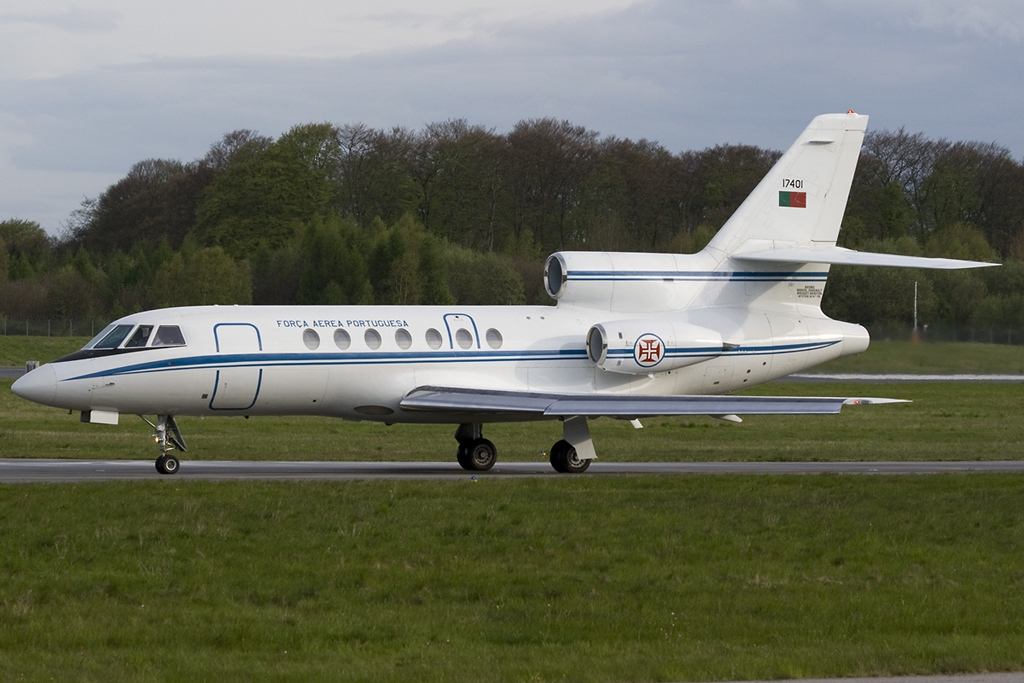
Dassault Falcon 50

== List of presidents ==
See: List of presidents of Portugal

=== Living former Presidents of Portugal ===
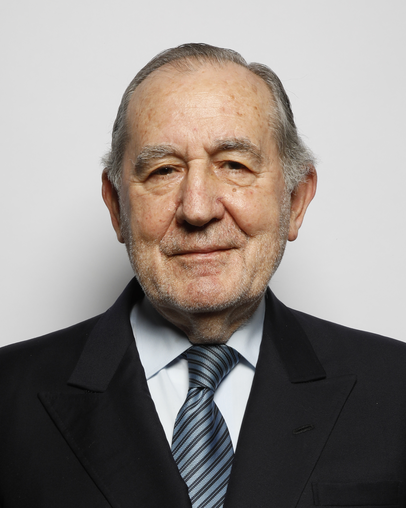
António Ramalho Eanes
(1976–1986)
25 January 1935 (age 91)

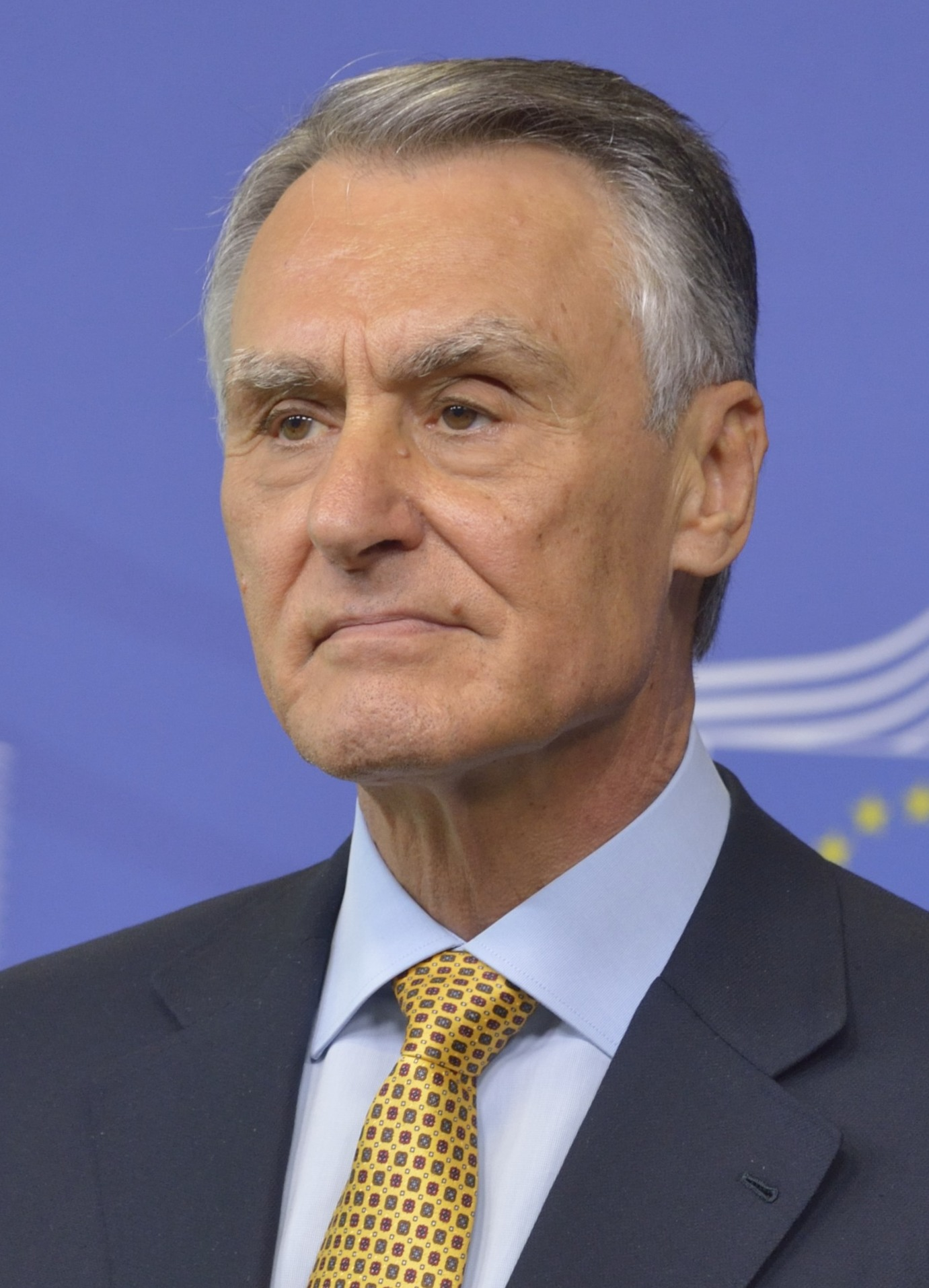
Aníbal Cavaco Silva
(2006–2016)
15 July 1939 (age 87)

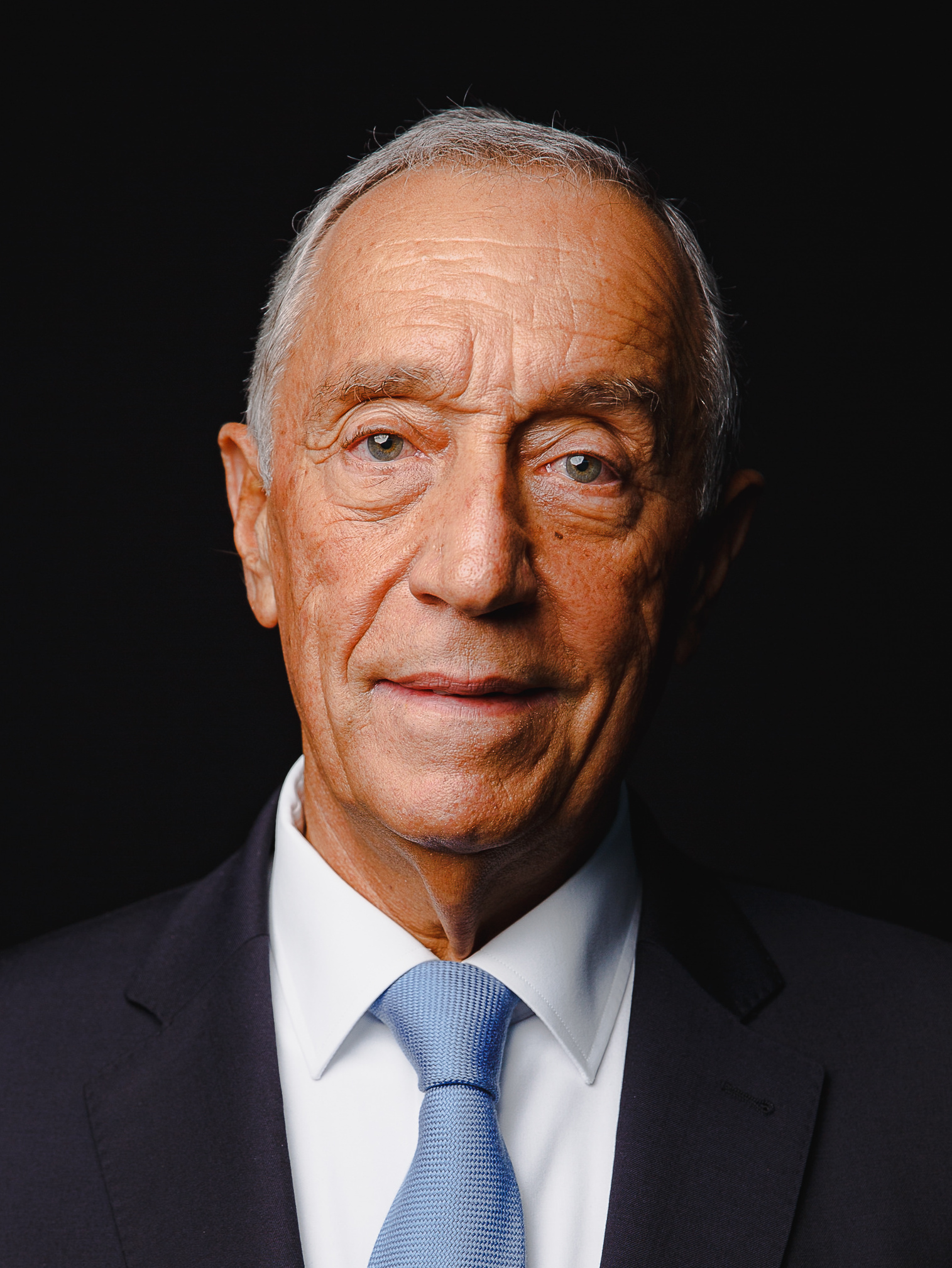
Marcelo Rebelo de Sousa
(2016–2026)
12 December 1948 (age 77)

== Historical rankings of presidents ==
Polling firm	Fieldwork date	Rebelo de Sousa	Cavaco Silva	Jorge Sampaio	Mário Soares	Ramalho Eanes	Costa Gomes	Oth	Lead
Polling firm	Fieldwork date	2016 2026	2006 2016	1996 2006	1986 1996	1976 1986	1974 1976	Oth	Lead
Polling firm	Fieldwork date	PSD	PSD	PS	PS	Ind. PRD	Ind.	Oth	Lead
Intercampus	6–13 Jan 2026	22.8	9.9	18.1	11.2	28.0	—N/a	9.9	5.2
Pitagórica	11–19 Dec 2025	11	15	26	13	29	0	6	3
Pitagórica	6–10 Oct 2025	12	12	23	12	32	1	8	9
Pitagórica	23–27 Feb 2025	13	12	24	14	30	0	7	6
Pitagórica	28 Dec 2024–5 Jan 2025	14	10	26	15	29	1	5	3
Intercampus	12–20 May 2024	15.9	7.7	19.2	10.8	28.4	—N/a	18.0	9.2
Intercampus	25–31 May 2023	27.0	6.7	22.3	8.8	25.7	—N/a	9.5	1.3
Pitagórica	21 Jun–4 Jul 2022	24	9	29	6	26	1	—N/a	3
Aximage	9–12 Nov 2018	39.4	4.5	17.3	8.8	26.7	—N/a	3.3	12.7

== See also ==
- Politics of Portugal
- Chief of the Civilian House
- First Lady of Portugal
