= Maria da Assunção Esteves =

Portuguese politician

Her Excellency Assunção Esteves GCC
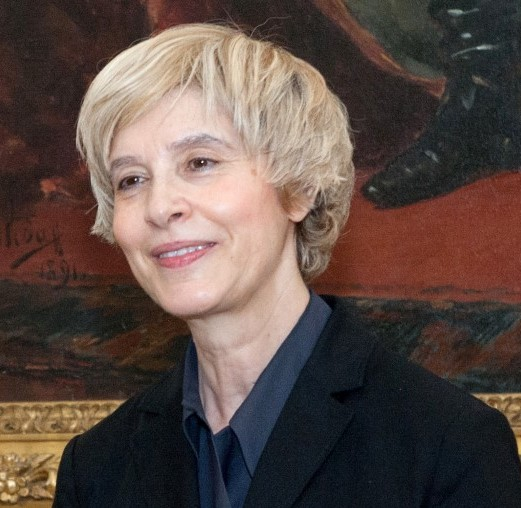
- Esteves in 2015

President of the Assembly of the Republic
- In office 21 June 2011 – 22 October 2015
- Preceded by: Jaime Gama
- Succeeded by: Eduardo Ferro Rodrigues

Member of the Assembly of the Republic
- In office 22 June 2011 – 22 October 2015
- Constituency: Lisbon
- In office 5 April 2002 – 20 June 2004
- Constituency: Vila Real
- In office 13 August 1987 – 2 August 1989
- Constituency: Vila Real

Member of the European Parliament
- In office 20 June 2004 – 13 July 2009
- Constituency: Portugal

Justice of the Constitutional Court
- In office August 1989 – March 1998
- Preceded by: Raul Mateus da Silva
- Succeeded by: Paulo Mota Pinto

Personal details
- Born: 15 October 1956 (age 69) Valpaços, Portugal
- Party: Social Democratic Party
- Spouse: José Lamego (divorced)
- Education: Catholic University of Portugal
- Profession: Jurist

Maria da Assunção Andrade Esteves (born 15 October 1956) is a Portuguese politician who was President of the Assembly of the Republic of Portugal from 2011 to 2015. She was a Member of the European Parliament for the Social Democratic Party–People's Party coalition, part of the European People's Party–European Democrats group, from 2004 to 2009.

== Life and career ==
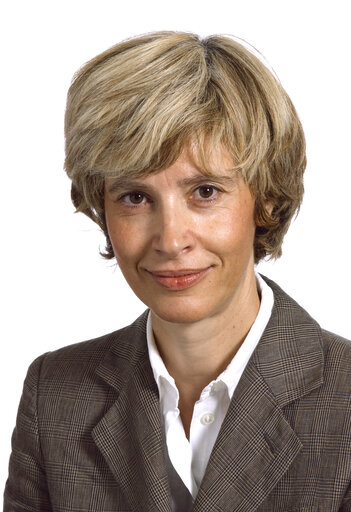
Official portrait as an MEP, 2004

Born in Valpaços, Valpaços, Assunção Esteves holds both a bachelor's degree and a master's degree in law from the Faculty of Law of the University of Lisbon, where she was an assistant between 1989 and 1999. During that time, she was also a Justice of the Portuguese Constitutional Court from 1989 to 1998.

On 21 June 2011 she became the first female President of the Assembly of the Republic. At the time, being unable to receive both her salary of €5,219.15 as President of the Assembly and her retirement pension of €7,255, which she started receiving at the age of 42, for having been a Justice of the Portuguese Constitutional Court, she chose to keep her retirement pension. Additionally, she received €2,133 for work expenses.

== Honours ==
=== National ===
- Grand Cross of the Order of Christ (11 November 2015)

=== Foreign ===
- Mexico: Sash of the Order of the Aztec Eagle (17 August 2015)
- Peru: Grand Cross of the Order of the Sun (26 July 2013)

Political offices
Preceded by Jaime Gama	President of the Assembly of the Republic; 2011–2015	Succeeded by Eduardo Ferro Rodrigues
