= Manuel Tito de Morais =

Portuguese politician

Manuel Alfredo Tito de Morais (28 June 1910 in Lisbon – 14 December 1999), was a Portuguese politician.

== Background ==
Tito de Morais was the eldest child and son of Tito Augusto de Morais (Peso da Régua, 11 February 1880 – 1963), a Navy Officer of the Portuguese Navy, Provisional Governor of Portuguese India in 1926, and a Minister, and wife (m. 2 June 1909) Carolina de Antas de Loureiro de Macedo (8 July 1881 - ?), sister-in-law of Augusto de Paiva Bobela da Mota, 116th, also (Provisional) Governor of Portuguese India in 1919 and great-great-granddaughter in female line of the 1st Baron of São José de Porto Alegre, a rich merchant from Macau. He was the brother of Maria Palmira Tito de Morais, a pioneer in the field of nursing in Portugal.

== Career ==
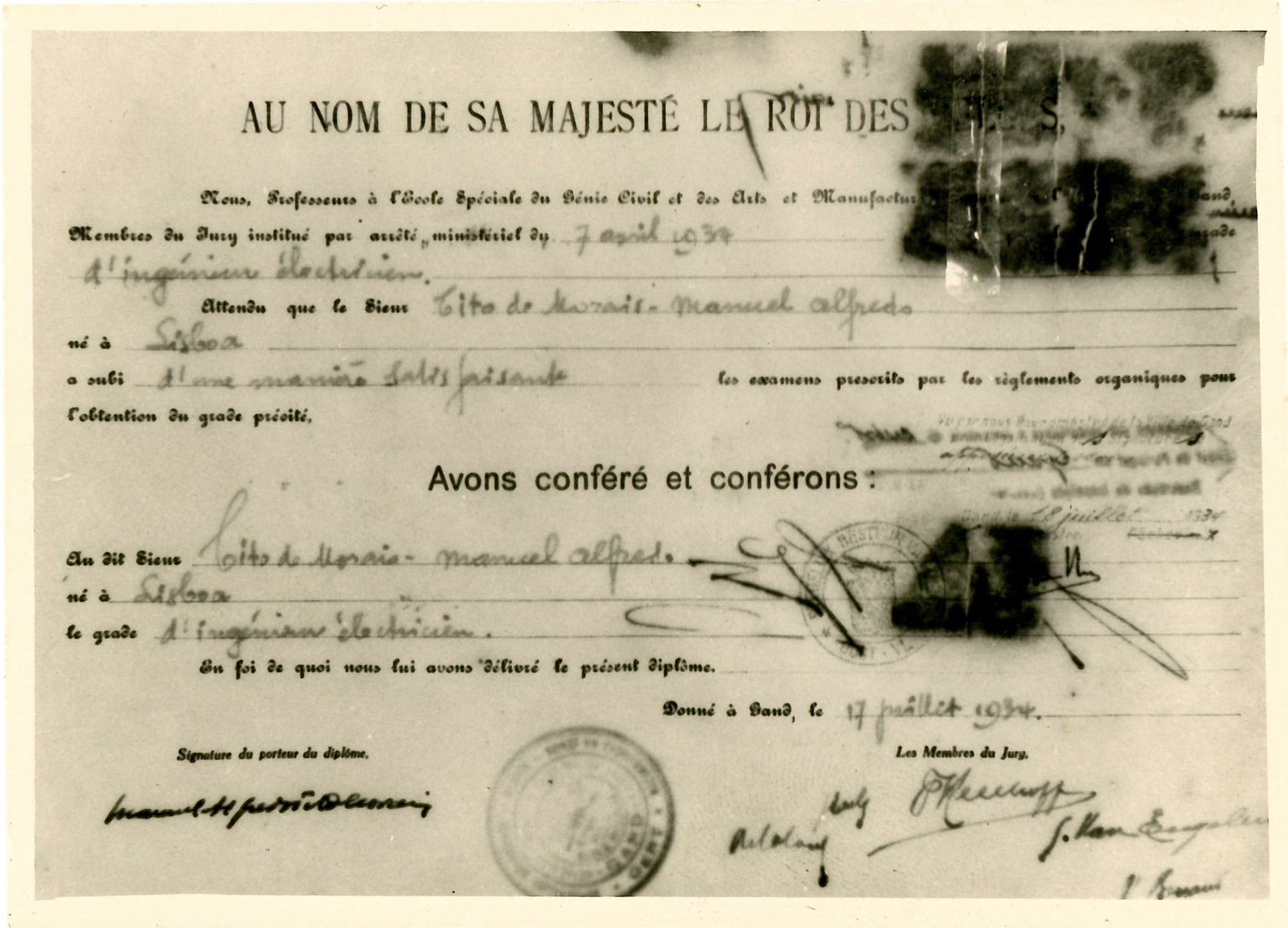
Reproduction of Manuel A. Tito de Morais' diploma from Ghent University

He graduated as a Licentiate in Electronic Engineering from Ghent University (Belgium) (see picture).

In 1945, with the end of World War II and the beginning of new democratic movements, he was a Member of the Central Commission of the Movimento de Unidade Democrática (MUD). However, due to the political conditionments of the Estado Novo, he was forced to exile in the Portuguese overseas territory of Angola, where two of his sons were born in the 1950s, France, Brazil, Algeria, where Manuel Alegre and other resistant elements, many of whom Socialists as him, did also live and where another son was born in the 1960s, Switzerland, Italy and West Germany. In Algeria he was the Director of the Junta de Salvação Nacional and, in Geneva in 1964, he founded the Associação Socialista Portuguesa (ASP), which later originated the Socialist Party (PS) in 1973, of which he was also one of the Founders and a Militant.

After the Carnation Revolution and the legalization of his Party, he became a Deputy to the Constituent Assembly in 1975 and a Deputy to the Assembly of the Republic in the following year of 1976. Between May 1979 and April 1980 he held the office of Vice-President of the Parliamentary Assembly of the European Council.

He occupied the office of Vice-President of the Assembly of the Republic between 8 February 1978 and 29 October 1978 and again from 22 October 1981 and 30 May 1983, and was its 6th President from 8 June 1983 to 24 October 1984. In these last functions he also became a Member of the Portuguese Council of State.

In the 6th Congress of PS he became its President between 1986 and 1989.

A wealth of information on his political career is available on the Portuguese national archive (known as the "Arquivo Nacional Torre do Tombo").

== Family ==
He married firstly Maria da Conceição Formosinho Mealha (Silves, Silves, 1912 - Lisbon, 1992), daughter of João Vitorino Mealha, a Lawyer (whose mother's paternal grandfather was famous Portuguese Miguelist outlaw and bandit Remexido), and wife Maria Julieta da Guerra Formosinho, whom he divorced, and had five children:

- Maria Carolina Mealha Tito de Morais, married to Augusto Manuel Rodrigues Correia Pereira de Oliveira (Lisbon, 30 April 1932 - Lisbon, 1 August 1984), and had issue
- Maria da Conceição Mealha Tito de Morais, married to Vítor Manuel Correia Pires, and had issue
- João Manuel Mealha Tito de Morais (Lisbon, 1939 - Lisbon, 25 November 2001), married firstly to Geny de Almeida, and had issue, and married secondly to Lúcia de Melo, without issue:
  - Marcelo Augusto Tito de Morais
    - Marcos Augusto Alves Tito de Morais
    - Marcelo Stéfano Alves Tito de Morais
    - Matheus Meirelles Itajahy Tito de Morais
    - Lucas Meirelles Itajahy Tito de Morais
  - João Luís Tito de Morais
    - Gabriela Romeiro Tito de Morais
- Maria Luísa Mealha Tito de Morais (b. Lisbon, 19 August 1942), married firstly as his second wife to Pedro Manuel Ramos de Almeida, whom she divorced, and had issue, and married secondly to Dulcínio Caiano Pereira, without issue
- Maria Teresa Mealha Tito de Morais (b. 1945), married to Jaime Teixeira Mendes (b. 1943), a Medical Doctor, and had issue

He married secondly Maria Emília Adelaide Pedroso da Cunha Rego Monteiro dos Santos (Lisbon, São Sebastião da Pedreira, 2 May 1923 - Lisbon, 7 April 2011), of some maternal Nobility, and had three children:

- Manuel Tito de Morais (Luanda, 2 October 1953), unmarried and without issue
- Luís Manuel Tito de Morais (Luanda, 20 October 1955), married to Anne Huguette Bertrand, French, and had issue:
  - Claire Tito de Morais
  - Marine Tito de Morais
- Pedro Manuel Tito de Morais (Algiers, 24 August 1964), unmarried and without issue
