= José Vitoriano =

Portuguese politician

José Rodrigues Vitoriano (1918, Silves – 3 February 2006) was a Portuguese politician and a major figure in the struggle against the Portuguese fascist regime led by António Oliveira Salazar.

== Early life ==
Vitoriano started work at the age of 13 in a cork factory in Algarve and joined the Portuguese Communist Party in 1941. Between 1945 and 1948 he was the president of the cork workers' Trade Union. After that, in 1951, he became a cadre of the Party.

== Imprisonment ==
Meanwhile, in 1948, he had been imprisoned by the regime's political police, the PIDE, only leaving jail in 1950. In 1953 he was arrested once more, and was sentenced to four years; however, as the fascist sentences for political prisoners were open-ended, Vitoriano only left jail in 1966. In January 1967, he became a clandestine, a usual method used by the members of the Communist Party to avoid detentions. He would only leave that status after the democratic revolution of 1974. Vitoriano spent a total of 17 years in jail.

== Political career ==
Vitoriano was a member of the Party's Central Committee between 1968 and 2000 and a member of its Secretariat between 1968 and 1972. Between 1977 and 1987, he was a member of the Portuguese Parliament, being its vice-president between 1977 and 1984.

== Death ==
José Vitoriano died on 3 February 2006 in Lisbon.
