= Leonardo Ribeiro de Almeida =

Portuguese politician (1924–2006)

Leonardo Eugénio Ramos Ribeiro de Almeida (19 September 1924 in Santarém – 18 January 2006), was a Portuguese politician.

== Career ==
He was a Licentiate in Law from the Faculty of Law of the University of Lisbon and became a Lawyer.

He joined then Popular Democratic Party (PPD), later Social Democratic Party (PSD) in May 1974 and in the following year he was elected a Deputy to the Constituent Assembly and in 1980 again to the Assembly of the Republic.

He became the 3rd and 5th President of the Assembly of the Republic between 8 January 1980 and 21 October 1981 and again from 3 November 1982 to 30 May 1983, in which period he also became according to his office a Member of the Portuguese Council of State.

He was also a Minister of Defence between November 1985 and August 1987.

Internationally he participated in the Conference of Presidents of the European Parliaments in Madrid in 1980 and he represented the Portuguese Parliament at the Conference of the Latin-American Parliaments in Bogotá in 1981. As the President of the Portuguese Association of the Atlantic he participated in 1982 in the Sea-Link/82, in the United States of America.

== Family ==
He was married and had issue.
