= Teófilo Carvalho dos Santos =

Portuguese politician

Teófilo Carvalho dos Santos (4 September 1906 in Lisbon – 24 March 1986), was a Portuguese politician.

== Career ==
He was a Licentiate in Law from the Faculty of Law of the University of Lisbon.

In 1945 he became one of the Founders of the Partido Trabalhista and, four years later in 1949, he integrated the core of the Resistência Republicana Socialista.

In 1969 he joined the Accção Socialista Portuguesa (ASP) and in 1973, along with other Members of that Party, he founded the Socialist Party.

After the Carnation Revolution and the legalization of his Party he was a Deputy for PS to the Assembly of the Republic for eleven years, between 1975 and 1986. He died in office.

He was the 2nd President of the Assembly of the Republic for two years, from 30 October 1978 to 7 January 1980, in which period he was also inherently a Member of the Portuguese Council of State.

== Family ==
He married Maria Fernanda Troni de Sousa e Melo, daughter of Vasco de Sousa e Melo, a Lawyer, and wife (m. Alenquer, 27 April 1922) Maria Regina Namorado Troni (Alenquer, Triana, 20 December 1889 - ?), whose paternal grandfather was Italian, and had issue:

- Maria Regina de Sousa e Melo Carvalho dos Santos, married in Lisbon on 19 April 1969 to Nuno Manuel de Brederode Rodrigues dos Santos, a Deputy to the Assembly of the Republic (of distant Dutch descent, great-great-grandson in female line of the 2nd Counts of Vila Real and great-great-great-grandson of the 2nd Counts of a Cunha), brother of Maria Emília de Brederode Rodrigues dos Santos and brother in law of José Manuel de Medeiros Ferreira, also a Deputy to the Assembly of the Republic, and had issue:
  - Vasco de Melo de Brederode dos Santos (b. Lisbon, 18 August 1977)
  - Alexandre de Melo de Brederode dos Santos (b. Lisbon, 24 May 1980)
- Vasco de Sousa e Melo Carvalho dos Santos, unmarried and without issue
