= Adelino Gomes =

Portuguese journalist and academic (born 1944)

Adelino Gomes ComIH
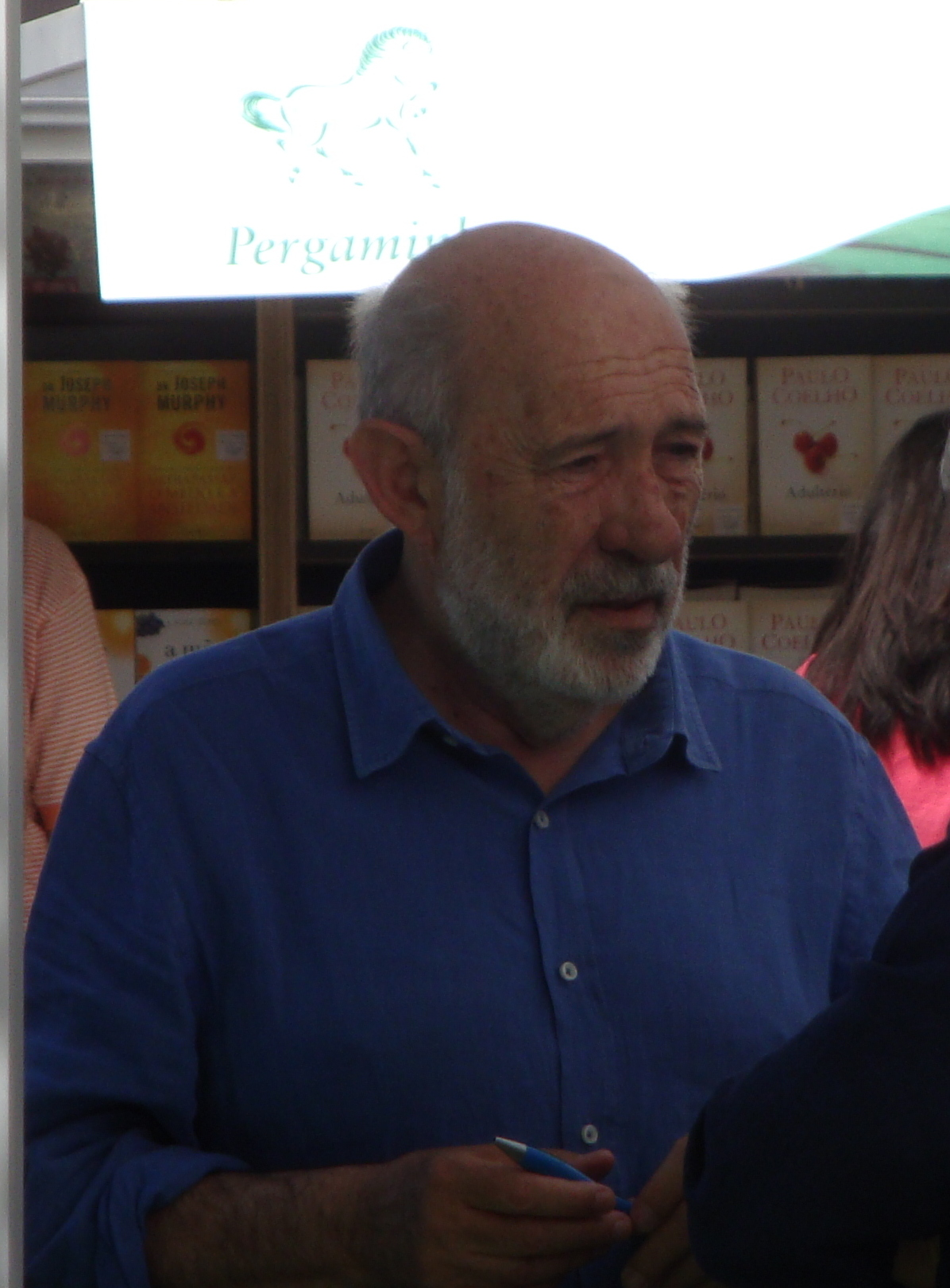
- Adelino Gomes in 2008
- Born: Adelino Clemente Gomes; 10 August 1944 (age 82); Marrazes, Leiria, Portugal
- Education: University of Lisbon
- Occupations: Journalist, broadcaster, academic
- Awards: Order of Prince Henry (Commander); Gazeta de Mérito Award (2010)

Adelino Clemente Gomes ComIH (born 10 August 1944) is a Portuguese journalist, radio broadcaster and academic. He is particularly known for his reporting of the Carnation Revolution on 25 April 1974, when he covered the military uprising for Rádio Renascença. He subsequently worked for RTP, reporting on political developments during the Portuguese Revolutionary Process, including the attempted coup of 11 March 1975 and the conflicts associated with the decolonisation of Portuguese Africa and East Timor.

One of the founders of the newspaper Público, Gomes served as its deputy director and senior editor. He also held senior positions within Portuguese public broadcasting, including director of information at Antena 1 and Ombudsman for Radio Listeners at RTP from 2008 to 2010. In addition to his journalistic career, he has taught journalism and researched media and communication, obtaining a doctorate in sociology from ISCTE in 2011.

== Early life and education ==
Adelino Gomes was born in Marrazes, in the municipality of Leiria, Portugal, on 10 August 1944. He attended the Liceu Nacional de Leiria before moving to Lisbon, where he studied philosophy and law at the University of Lisbon.

He began his journalistic career in radio, working at Rádio Universidade, a station associated with the Portuguese national broadcasting service, Emissora Nacional. He subsequently worked for several Portuguese and international broadcasters, including Rádio Clube Português, Rádio Renascença and Deutsche Welle.

== Journalistic career ==
=== The Carnation Revolution ===
Gomes became particularly associated with his reporting of the Carnation Revolution of 25 April 1974, the military coup that overthrew Portugal's Estado Novo dictatorship.

On the morning of the revolution, he initially found himself among the civilians witnessing the events rather than working as an assigned correspondent. He subsequently became involved in the reporting of the uprising for Rádio Renascença, contributing to a collective radio broadcast that followed the movements of the military forces in Lisbon. His account included the events surrounding the advance of the military column commanded by Fernando Salgueiro Maia, whom he had known from his school years.

In later interviews, Gomes recalled the improvised circumstances of the reporting, explaining that he arrived at the events without a notebook or recording equipment and eventually participated in the radio coverage using equipment shared with other journalists.

His reporting became one of the contemporary journalistic records of the revolution. In 2010, the Clube de Jornalistas recognised his career with the Gazeta de Mérito award, citing his coverage of the 25 April revolution, the attempted coup of 11 March 1975 and the civil conflict in Timor among the notable episodes of his work.

=== Reporting for RTP ===
In 1975, Gomes worked as a reporter for RTP, covering the political and military developments of the revolutionary period. His reporting included the 11 March 1975 coup attempt and the increasingly unstable political situation that followed the fall of the dictatorship.

He also reported on the consequences of Portuguese decolonisation and the conflicts in former Portuguese territories. Among his assignments was the coverage of the displacement of refugees during the emerging civil conflict in Angola. RTP's historical archives preserve several of his reports from Luanda in July 1975, including material concerning refugees leaving the city.

His work also took him to East Timor, where he covered developments associated with the decolonisation process and the outbreak of conflict in the territory. In December 1975, he reported on the Indonesian invasion and military operations in the region, including events around Maliana.

He subsequently returned to the subject of East Timor in his written work, following the territory's transition towards independence. In 2004, he published As Flores Nascem na Prisão: Timor-Leste, Ano Um, a journalistic account of the first year of independent East Timor.

=== Público ===
In 1989, Gomes helped establish the newspaper Público, which became one of Portugal's leading national newspapers. He subsequently served as deputy director and senior editor, becoming one of the newspaper's principal journalists during its early years.

During his career at Público, he continued to work on subjects related to Portuguese political history, the democratic transition and international affairs. His previous experience covering the revolutionary period and the decolonisation process also informed his subsequent written work on these subjects.

=== Radio broadcasting and public service ===
Alongside his work in print and television journalism, Gomes maintained a long career in radio. He worked as a broadcaster for Rádio Clube Português, Rádio Renascença and Deutsche Welle, and held managerial and editorial responsibilities within Radiodifusão Portuguesa (RDP), including directing information and producing radio programmes.

He was also involved in the development of journalism and radio training in Portugal. He worked as a trainer at the Centre for Professional Training of Journalists (CENJOR) and coordinated the training course for journalists and broadcast presenters organised by TSF Rádio Notícias.

==== Ombudsman for Radio Listeners ====
In 2008, Gomes was selected by the administration of RTP to succeed José Nuno Martins as Ombudsman for Radio Listeners (Provedor do Ouvinte) at RDP. His appointment was subsequently approved by the broadcaster's Opinion Council, and he began his mandate on 26 June 2008.

The position involved examining complaints, suggestions and comments submitted by listeners concerning the programming and editorial practices of Portugal's public radio service. Gomes was also responsible for presenting the weekly programme Em Nome do Ouvinte, through which he discussed listeners' concerns and broader issues affecting public broadcasting.

During his mandate, he sought to broaden the programme's discussions beyond individual complaints. Its initial broadcasts included conversations with former radio professionals about the history and development of Portuguese broadcasting, including the radio services that had operated in Portugal's former African colonies.

His mandate ended in June 2010, when he was succeeded by Mário Figueiredo.

== Academic career and research ==
Gomes pursued an academic career alongside his work in journalism. He taught at the Escola Superior de Comunicação Social in Lisbon, the Porto School of Journalism and the Universidade Autónoma de Lisboa, in addition to teaching at ISCTE. He also worked in professional journalism training through CENJOR and TSF.

In 2011, he obtained a doctorate in sociology from ISCTE, specialising in the sociology of communication, culture and education. His doctoral dissertation was entitled O Telejornal e o Zapping na Era da Internet: Estudo do Comportamento de Editores e Telespectadores nos Jornais Televisivos das 20 Horas da RTP1, SIC e TVI (2006–2010).

The research examined the production and reception of evening television news broadcasts in Portugal, focusing on the main evening newscasts of three national television broadcasters: RTP1, SIC and TVI. In preparing the research, Gomes undertook participant observation in the newsrooms of the three broadcasters, supplemented by questionnaires and in-depth interviews with the editors responsible for their 8 p.m. news programmes.

A portion of his doctoral research was subsequently published in 2012 as the book Nos Bastidores dos Telejornais: RTP1, SIC e TVI, issued by Tinta-da-China. The work examines the editorial processes involved in the preparation and broadcasting of television news.

Gomes was also associated with the Centre for Research and Studies in Sociology (CIES-IUL), where he participated in research projects examining the professional characteristics and social profiles of Portuguese journalists. These included the projects Perfil Sociológico do Jornalista Português (2005–2009) and As Novas Gerações de Jornalistas em Portugal (2009–2013).

In 2012, he also participated in the initiative Para uma Carta de Princípios do Jornalismo na Era da Internet, part of the research project Jornalismo e Sociedade, which addressed the ethical and professional principles of journalism in the digital age.

In 2017, Gomes served on the jury of the Gabriel García Márquez Journalism Award, participating in the judging of the award's coverage category in Cartagena de Indias, Colombia.

== Publications ==
Gomes has published books and other works addressing Portuguese political history, the Carnation Revolution, journalism and the history of East Timor.

His selected publications and collaborations include:

- O Dia 25 de Abril: Diário da Revolução (1974), a double album of radio reports recorded during the Carnation Revolution, produced in collaboration with Paulo Coelho and Pedro Laranjeira.
- Portugal 2020 (1998).
- O 25 de Abril de 1974: 76 Fotografias e um Retrato (1999), produced in collaboration with photographer Alfredo Cunha. The work brought together photographs taken during the revolution, with captions by Gomes.
- Carlos Gil: Um Fotógrafo na Revolução (2004).
- As Flores Nascem na Prisão: Timor-Leste, Ano Um (2004), a journalistic account of the first year of East Timor's independence, with a foreword by historian José Mattoso.
- Os Dias Loucos do PREC (2006), co-authored with other contributors.
- Nos Bastidores dos Telejornais: RTP1, SIC e TVI (2012), based on his doctoral research into television news production.
- Os Rapazes dos Tanques (2014), co-authored with photographer Alfredo Cunha. The book combines photographs and interviews with members of the military units that confronted one another in Lisbon on 25 April 1974, including non-commissioned officers and soldiers who did not follow orders to open fire.

== Awards and honours ==
On 10 June 1991, Gomes was appointed Commander of the Order of Prince Henry (Ordem do Infante D. Henrique), one of Portugal's national orders.

In 2011, he received the 2010 Gazeta de Mérito award from the Clube de Jornalistas. The award recognised his career spanning approximately four and a half decades in radio, television and print journalism, with particular acknowledgement of his work as a reporter during major political events in Portuguese history.

He also received the Igrejas Caeiro Award from the Portuguese Society of Authors (SPA), in recognition of his contribution to Portuguese radio and journalism.
