= Maria Antónia Palla =

Portuguese feminist, journalist and abortion-rights activist

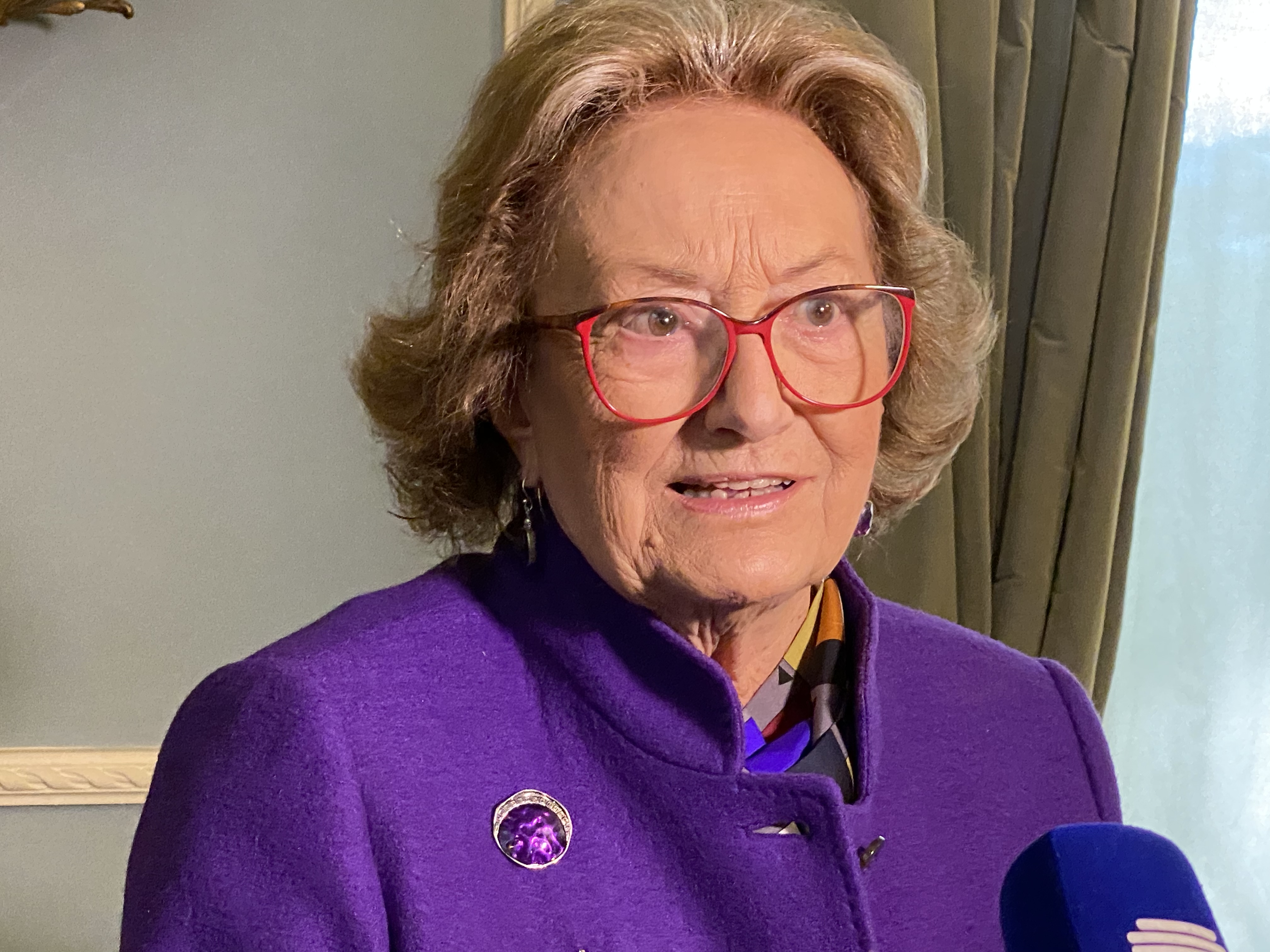
- Born: Maria Antónia de Assis dos Santos; 10 January 1933 (age 93); Seixal, Portugal
- Occupation: Journalist
- Known for: Journalist, feminist, abortion-rights activist
- Spouses: Orlando da Costa (m. 1953; div. 1962); Victor Palla (m. 1962; div. 1965); Manuel Pedroso Marques (m. 1974)
- Children: Isabel dos Santos da Costa (1957-1960); António Costa

Maria Antónia Palla (born 10 January 1933) is a Portuguese journalist, writer and feminist who was one of the first female journalists in Portugal. She played an important role in the legalization of abortion in the country, by promoting the practice in interviews and television programmes. In 2004 Palla was awarded the title of Commander of the Order of Liberty. She is the mother of António Costa, the former Prime Minister of Portugal.

== Early life ==
Maria Antónia Palla was born Maria Antónia de Assis dos Santos in Seixal, Portugal in January 1933 at the home of her paternal grandparents. At the age of four she moved to Sintra. She was brought up in an atheist, communist, and republican family. Her paternal grandfather and grandmother were Republicans and Freemasons. Her father, Ítalo Ferrer dos Santos, was the first in his family not to be baptised as a Catholic. Her mother was Angelina Painço de Assis. In contrast to her father's parents, her mother's parents were very conservative atheists. She claimed that from the time she had learnt to read her toys were books. Palla attended the Lycée français Charles Lepierre in Lisbon and graduated in Historical-Philosophical Sciences from the Faculty of Letters of the University of Lisbon. At university she briefly became a member of the Movement of Democratic Unity (MUD), which was a quasi-legal body opposed to the Estado Novo dictatorship.

After graduating in 1953, she married one of her lovers - the Goan-origin Communist writer Orlando da Costa - and became a housewife. He had been imprisoned six months earlier in Caxias prison near Lisbon. She was not allowed to have conjugal visits with him in prison because she was not his wife, and so she convinced him when he was released that they should get married in case he was arrested again. She gave birth to their only daughter, Isabel dos Santos da Costa, in 1957. Palla supported the 1958 presidential campaign of the pro-American independent candidate Humberto Delgado, in spite of his condemnation by the Portuguese Communist Party, because she was strongly anti-Salazar. In 1960, Isabel died in a road accident.

Palla gave birth to her only son António Costa on 17 July 1961. She then divorced his father Orlando da Costa in 1962 to marry her extra-marital lover, the Portuguese architect Victor Palla, as his third wife. This marriage also ended in divorce when she was 32 years old, but she kept Palla's surname. After her second divorce, she lived alone with her son. She also worked as a secretary and was the mistress of several men.

== Becoming a journalist ==
Convinced that she wanted to be a journalist she used her savings to go to Brazil for a month. Her report of that trip was published by Diário Popular and was a great success. This enabled her to obtain a permanent assignment with Diário Popular in 1968, when she was among the first group of women journalists to be admitted to the editorial staff of that daily newspaper. In the Diário Popular and later, she showed a particular interest in stories that revealed the violence suffered by women, children and the elderly. Three months after joining she was awarded a prize for an article about alcoholic wives, buying a television with the prize money. Her forensic approach to journalism made her claim that had she not been a journalist she would have been a member of Portugal's Judicial police. She was, however, dismissed from the Diário Popular for writing, without formal authorisation, a review of the events in Paris of May 1968, which involved widespread strikes and student protests. The following year she published a book entitled Revolução, meu amor – Maio 68, um ano depois (Revolution, My Love - May 68, a year on), including interviews with diverse observers, such as the singer/songwriter, actor and director Jacques Brel, the film director Jean Luc Godard, the cartoonist Siné, the sociologist Alain Touraine, the journalist and politician Françoise Giroud, and the student leader Jacques Sauvageot. This book, in turn, was banned by the Salazar-led Estado Novo regime, fearing a repetition of events in Paris in Portugal.

== O Século ==
Palla then began to work for the O Século newspaper, particularly for its weekly magazine O Século Ilustrado, being the first woman to join the editorial staff of the company and rapidly becoming editor-in-chief. In order to employ her the publisher had to be assured that, although she was a woman, she "writes like a man". She stayed with O Século Ilustrado for 11 years, travelling all over Portugal and working with the well-known photographers Eduardo Gageiro, Fernando Baião and Alfredo Cunha. She also carried out overseas missions, including one to prepare an article on the Rio Carnival and another to write about colonialism in the Bissagos Islands in Guinea-Bissau, which presented a view of this Portuguese colony that conflicted with the regime's claim that Portugal and its colonies were one country where all were treated equally, and which led to a threat by the regime to close O Século Ilustrado. She has also worked for the Agência Noticiosa Portuguesa (ANOP), now the Lusa News Agency, and for Diário de Notícias, among others.

== After the Carnation Revolution ==
She married a Portuguese colonel, Manuel Pedroso Marques, as her third husband in 1974. On the day of the Carnation Revolution, which led to the overthrow of the Estado Novo, Palla was on the streets of Lisbon witnessing events, including the release of prisoners from the Caxias prison, in which her first husband had been incarcerated. Between 1974 and 1976, together with Antónia de Sousa, she made a fortnightly television series for the state broadcaster, RTP, called Nome Mulher (Woman's Name), which featured 46 reports, each of 50 minutes. The first was shown in August 1974, and was dedicated to the early feminist and journalist Maria Lamas, who had a strong influence on Palla when she was a student. Another in the series looked at the writer and feminist Elina Guimarães.

In 1976 they produced a programme titled Aborto não é Crime (Abortion is not a crime). This programme, broadcast in February 1976, showed images of a woman having an abortion. Palla also gave an interview to the New York Times (published 13 March 1976, page 39) where she freely admitted to having had "several abortions" during her lifetime. Palla was accused of "offence to modesty and incitement to crime" after a complaint by a Lisbon maternity hospital. The series Nome Mulher was suspended from broadcast by the then president of RTP, who was ironically also her then husband. Criminal proceedings were instituted and she went to court but was acquitted in 1979. Her strong pro-abortion stance led to the establishment of the National Campaign for Contraception and Abortion. However, it was not until 2007 that abortion was allowed in Portugal. In 1979 she published Só acontece aos Outros – crónicas de violência (It only happens to others –stories of violence) on the subject of domestic violence.

Palla was the first woman to be a member of the Portuguese Union of Journalists, eventually becoming its vice-president. She worked closely on the Union with Maria Antónia de Sousa and Maria Antónia Fiadeiro, and they were called "the three Antónias" by the future prime minister Maria de Lourdes Pintasilgo. She was also the first woman to assume the presidency of the Journalists Pension Fund, holding the position for twelve years. She was one of the promoters of the Feminist Library, dedicated to the memory of Ana de Castro Osório, which is housed in the Municipal Library of Belém, near Lisbon and was only the second feminist library to be established in Europe. Palla was an early member of UMAR, which was active in supporting her during her court case. When it was founded in September 1976 the acronym stood for Union of Anti-Fascist and Revolutionary Women but in 1999 it was changed to Alternative and Answer Women's Union. She was president of the League of Women's Rights, a feminist association formed in 1985.

== Awards and honours ==
On 25 April 2004 Palla was awarded the title of Commander of the Order of Liberty.

== Publications ==
- Viver pela Liberdade. Matéria Prima, 2014.
- Savimbi: Um sonho africano (with João Soares). Nova Ática, 2003.
- A Condição Feminina. Ed. Imprensa Nacional, 1989.
- Só acontece aos Outros – crónicas de violência. Ed. Bertrand, 1979. (Republished by Sibila Publicações, 2017).
- Revolução Meu Amor - Maio 68, um ano depois. Prelo, Lisbon, 1969. (Republished by Sibila Publicações, 2018).
