= Operation Influencer =

2023 corruption investigation in Portugal

Operation Influencer (Portuguese: Operação Influencer) is an ongoing investigation initiated by Portugal's Public Prosecution Service, probing potential corruption within deals that involved members of the Portuguese government during António Costa's premiership. The investigation focuses on alleged instances of active and passive corruption and malfeasance regarding four specific deals: two concessions for lithium mines in northern Portugal, a project for a green hydrogen production plant in Sines, and a project for a data centre, also located in Sines.

On 7 November 2023, the Public Prosecution Service issued a statement announcing a search, seizure and arrest operation in 42 locations, which included the office of the Prime Minister, the Ministry of the Environment and Climate Action, and the Ministry of Infrastructure. Five people were apprehended, including the Prime Minister's chief of staff, Vítor Escária, and the Mayor of Sines, Nuno Mascarenhas. The Minister of Infrastructure João Galamba was named a formal suspect (arguido) and Prime Minister António Costa became the subject of a separate inquiry by the country's Supreme Court of Justice.

The announcement of the operation led to the resignations of Costa and Galamba, and the fall of the XXIII Constitutional Government of Portugal. It was the first time that the Portuguese government was brought down by a criminal investigation. The investigation has since attracted criticism after the prosecutors admitted several mistakes, including confusion between the names of António Costa and then Minister of Economy António Costa Silva in the transcript of a wiretap.

== Background ==
=== Concession for lithium mine in Montalegre ===
On 28 March 2019, a concession agreement was signed between the Portuguese government and Lusorecursos Portugal Lithium, a company established three days prior to the contract signing, for lithium extraction in the Romano mine, in the municipality of Montalegre. The authorisation for the concession was granted by then Secretary of State of Energy João Galamba and then Minister of the Environment João Pedro Matos Fernandes. The company announced a mixed exploration project, with an initial phase of open-air mining, later turning into underground mining, and the construction of a refinery. Prospection of the region in the prior years revealed a deposit of 30 million tons of lithium.

The local population was opposed to the project, citing concerns over the open-air exploration, the size of the mine, and its environmental, health, and agricultural consequences. On 7 September 2019, the Portuguese Environment Agency (APA, Portuguese: Agência Portuguesa do Ambiente) released an environmental impact report that was favorable to the project. Several legal actions in late 2019 and subsequent environmental impact reports by the Avaliação de Impacte Ambiental stalled the project.

=== Concession for lithium mine in Boticas ===
The concession contract for the mined production of lithium in the Barroso mine, in Boticas, was signed on 22 February 2017 between Savannah Lithium and the Directorate-General of Energy and Geology (DGEG, Portuguese: Direção-Geral de Energia e Geologia). In June 2019, Portuguese ENGO Quercus denounced the lithium mine project to UNESCO alleging a "severe threat to the agricultural system of the Barroso region". In December 2019, the Municipal Assembly of Boticas approved a motion against the lithium mining in the municipality, alleging "irreversible damage" in the landscape and livelihood of the populations.

In June 2020, Savannah Lithium submitted an environmental impact report for the Barroso mine, which received in 2022 a unfavourable review from the evaluation commission of the Portuguese Environment Agency (APA). Nevertheless, the project was reformulated and re-submitted for evaluation and included an extensive list of measures to eliminate, mitigate, or minimise impacts. On 31 May 2023, a favourable environmental impact report was emitted by the APA, a decision that was contested by the Municipality of Boticas, environmental organisations, and some members of the local population.

=== H2Sines project ===
The H2Sines is a project for an industrial cluster in the port city of Sines for production of green hydrogen, backed by several companies in the energy sector, including EDP, Galp, REN, Martifer, and Vestas. In July 2020, the H2Sines project was selected by the Portuguese government for application to the status of Important Project of Common European Interest (IPCEI) in the European Union.

In November 2020, there were reports that Portugal's Public Prosecution Service was heavily scrutinising the relationships between members of the government and members of the private companies that were part of the consortium in charge of the project. Pedro Siza Vieira, Minister of State, Economy, and Digital Transition, and João Galamba were then allegedly being investigated over traffic of influence and corruption, amongst other economical-financial crimes.

=== Sines 4.0 data centre ===
Start Campus, a joint venture of Davidson Kempner Capital Management and Pioneer Point Partners, announced in 2021 the plan to build the Sines 4.0 hyperscaler data centre campus in Sines. The data centre will fully run on renewable energy and will comprise nine buildings. The construction of the first building began in April 2022.

== Investigation ==
According to Público, the investigation from the Public Prosecution Service that is now known as Operation Influencer was opened after the airing of a report in the RTP investigative journalism show Sexta às 9 in April 2019. The report was about suspicions concerning the concession contract for the exploration of the Romano lithim mine in Montalegre.

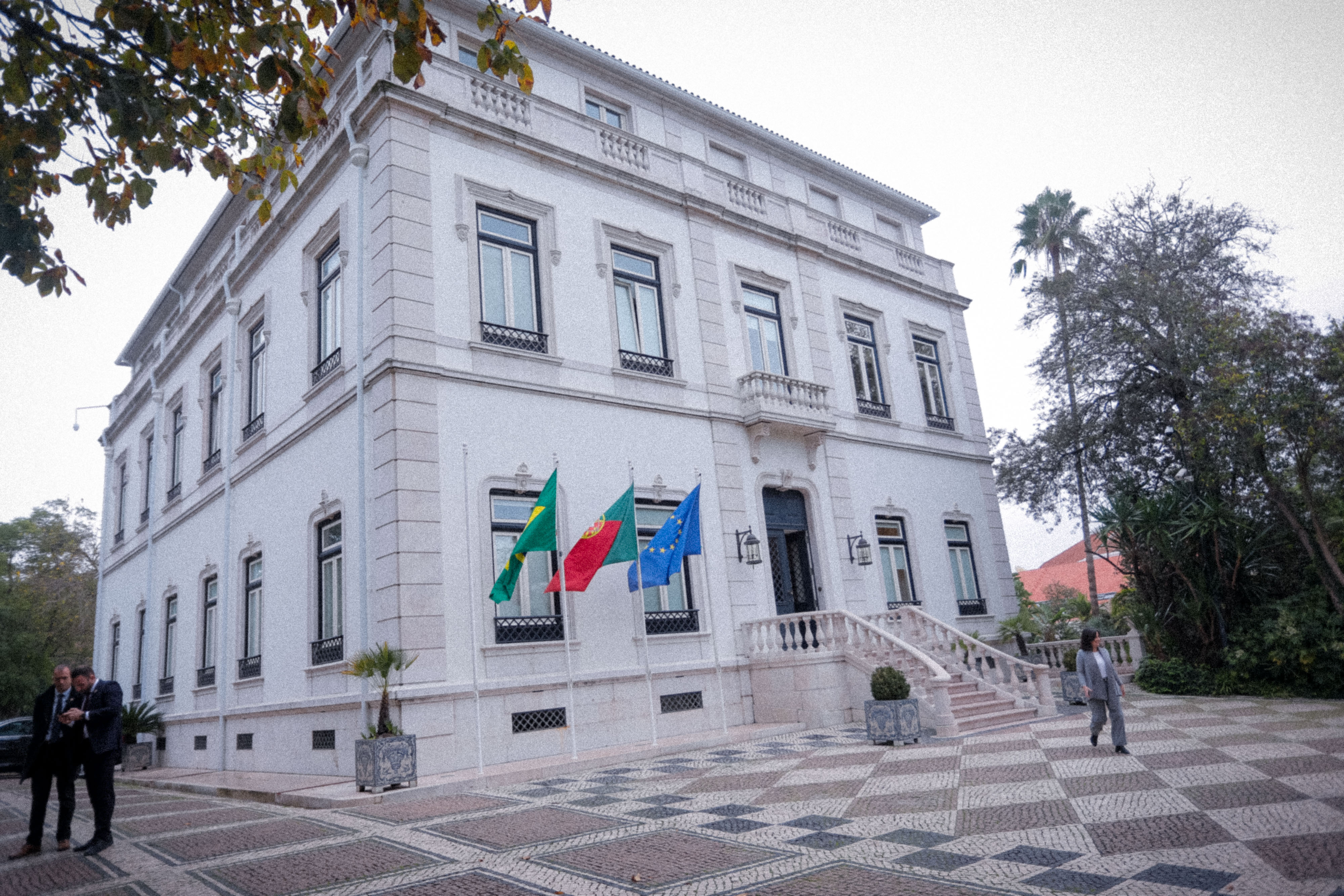
The São Bento Mansion, official residence of the Prime Minister of Portugal, was one of the places were searches were conducted.

On 7 November 2023, the Public Prosecution Service ordered searches in seventeen private properties, five lawyer offices, and twenty public and company offices in order to investigate possible active and passive corruption and malfeasance in the deals regarding the Romano mine in Montalegre, the Barroso mine in Boticas, and the H2Sines and the Sines 4.0 data centre projects in Sines. The public offices raided included the office of the Prime Minister's chief of staff in the São Bento Mansion (official residence of the Prime Minister), the Ministry of Infrastructure, the Ministry of Environment and Climate Action, the State Secretariat of Energy and Climate, the câmara municipal of Sines, and the national headquarters of the Socialist Party.

Arrest warrants were issued for António Costa's chief of staff Vítor Escária, the Sines mayor Nuno Mascarenhas, Diogo Lacerda Machado (a lawyer and close friend of António Costa that was working with Start Campus), and two other executives from Start Campus, Afonso Salema and Rui de Oliveira Neves. According to the prosecutor's office, the arrests were made because they represented a flight risk and to protect evidence.

João Galamba, the infrastructure minister, and Nuno Lacasta, president of the APA, are formal suspects. On 9 November, João Tiago Silveira, a former Secretary of State in past Socialist Party governments, was added to the list of formal suspects; there is a total of nine formal suspects. António Costa, the prime minister, is the target of an autonomous investigation by Portugal's Supreme Court of Justice over suspicions of intervening in the unblocking of procedures regarding the lithium mines and green hydrogen plant deals. The investigation was officially named Operation Influencer by the Public Prosecution Service on 9 November 2023.

78,000 euros in cash were found in Vítor Escária's office in the São Bento Mansion, hidden in books and wine boxes. When asked about this, his lawyer assured that the money found is not illegal. António Costa sacked Escária after learning about the money found in his office, replacing him with Tiago Vasconcelos. The money in his office was later proven to have no relation to the lithium and green hydrogen deals. On 13 November 2023, the five defendants who were arrested as part of Operation Influencer were allowed to wait for their trial in freedom. Escária had to surrender his passport and was also prohibited to leave Portugal. On 14 November, Escária announced that he was going to appeal against the coercive measures imposed on him.

== Consequences ==
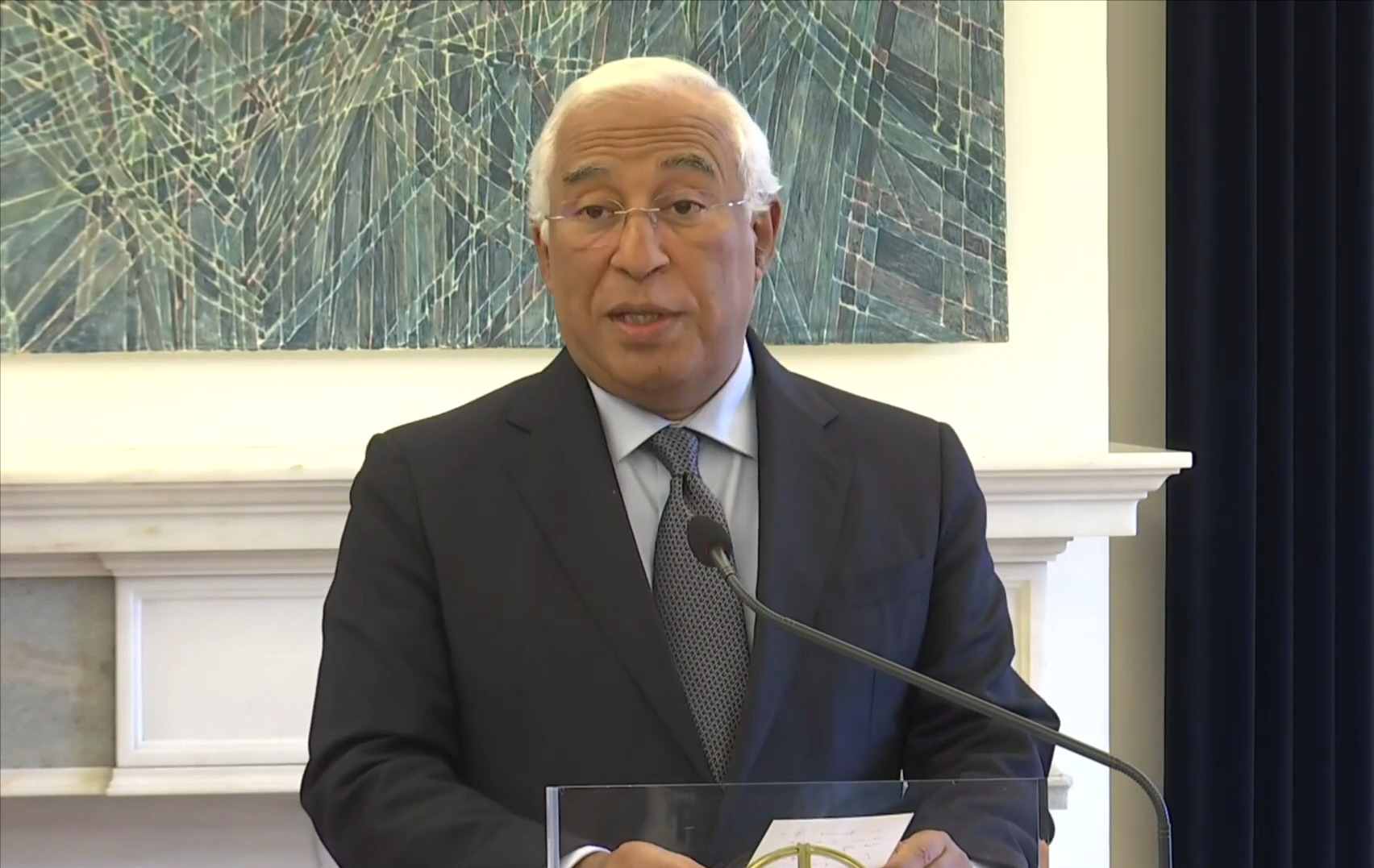
António Costa announcing his resignation on 7 November 2023

The announcement of the investigations on 7 November 2023 caused immediate political turmoil, with some opposition parties asking for the resignations of João Galamba and António Costa. Costa met with president Marcelo Rebelo de Sousa twice before announcing his resignation in a televised statement in the afternoon. He said he would not run again for office and would remain in caretaker duties until the next legislative elections.

On 9 November, after meeting with the Council of State and talking with the political parties represented in the Assembly of the Republic, president Rebelo de Sousa announced snap elections to be held on 10 March 2024. Because the 2024 government budget debate was still underway in the parliament and by law elections need to be held within 60 days of the dissolution of the parliament, president Rebelo de Sousa opted for dissolving the parliament after the final vote on the 2024 budget bill due on 29 November. On 13 November, João Galamba resigned from his position of Minister of Infrastructure. The project for the Barroso mine in Boticas was not affected by the investigations and is advancing towards the execution phase.

== See also ==
- 2024 Portuguese legislative election
- Corruption in Portugal
