= Vítor Escária =

Portuguese economist, politician (born 1971)

Chief of Staff to the Prime Minister
- In office 17 August 2020 – 9 November 2023
- President: António Costa
- Preceded by: Francisco André
- Succeeded by: Tiago de Almeida e Vasconcelos

Personal details
- Born: August 21, 1971 (age 55) Lisbon
- Relations: Susana Escária (wife)
- Education: University of York
- Occupation: Politician and economist

Vítor Manuel Álvares Escária (born 21 August 1971) is a Portuguese economist, specialized in European funds, and politician.

He got his PhD in economics in 2004 from the University of York in the UK.

He was appointed as the main economic adviser to José Sócrates on 4 April 2005, position that he would keep until 2011. He maintained business relations with Venezuela.

He was made a defendant in 2017 in the case and scandal known as Galpgate, resigned and returned in 2020. In August 2022 he was reappointed as António Costa's chief of staff, being sacked in November 2023 following Operation Influencer.

== Political life ==
Economic Adviser to the Prime Minister's Office of the XVII and XVIII Constitutional Government of Portugal.

Economic Adviser to the Office of the Prime Minister of Portugal of the XXI Constitutional Government of Portugal.

Head of the Cabinet of the Prime Minister of the XXII Constitutional Government of Portugal.

Chief of staff of the Prime Minister of Portugal of the XXIII Constitutional Government of Portugal.

== Operation Influencer ==
On 7 November 2023, due to Operation Influencer, some people were arrested, including António Costa's chief of staff, Vítor Escária, António Costa's close advisor, Diogo Lacerda Machado, and the mayor of Sines, Nuno Mascarenhas.

Judicial searches of Escária's office and home due to suspicion of lithium and hydrogen shady businesses.

Vítor Escária was found with 78,000 euros in his office. Asked why 78,000 euros in banknotes were found in Escária's office, his lawyer said that if it had been deposited in the bank there would have been "terrible trouble", although he assured that the money found is not illegal. António Costa sacked Escária, his chief of staff, after learning that the Public Prosecutor's Office had found the notes hidden in his office, being replaced with Tiago Vasconcelos. Later the 78,000 euros in his office were proven to have nothing to duo with the lithium and hydrogen businesses.

On 13 November 2023, the five defendants who were arrested as part of Operation Influencer, including Escária, were allowed to wait for their trial in freedom. This happened in the same day that João Galamba resigned. Vítor Escária had to surrender his passport and was also prohibited to leave Portugal. On 14 November Escária announced that he was going to appeal against the coercive measures imposed on him.

== See also ==
- Operation Influencer
- António Costa
- José Sócrates
