= Página Um =

Portuguese online newspaper

- O jornalismo independente (só) depende dos leitores.
- Type: Daily newspaper
- Format: Online
- Owner(s): Pedro Almeida Vieira (70%); Bartolomeu Costa Macedo (10%); Rita Pinto Coelho de Aguiar (10%); Luís Gomes (5%); Nuno André (5%)
- Founder: Pedro Almeida Vieira
- Editor-in-chief: Pedro Almeida Vieira; Serafim (Mascot)
- Founded: 2021
- Language: Portuguese
- Website: https://www.paginaum.pt

Página Um (stylized as PÁGINA UM) is a Portuguese daily digital investigative journalism newspaper. It was founded in 2021 by the journalist Pedro Almeida Vieira (its current executive director).

== History ==
In February 2023, it obtained access through the Administrative Court of Lisbon to a report on COVID-19 that the Instituto Superior Técnico (IST) refused to release. In this report, the IST "blamed" the June festivities for 330 deaths. Pedro Almeida Vieira wanted to clarify how the scientists' calculations had been made, as they contradicted official information on mortality during this period.

In August 2025, José Gabriel Quaresma (a news presenter at CNN Portugal), formally requested the closure of Página to the Portuguese Public Prosecution Service. The reason was the alleged existence of "serious irregularities" and the "dissemination of fake news" by Página Um. The formal request was also made to the Regulatory Authority for Social Communication (ERC), the Professional Journalist Card Commission (CCPJ) and the Journalists' Labour Union (SJ).

In August 2025, Filipe Alves, News Director of Diário de Notícias (DN), stated that Pedro Almeida Vieira "receives a salary but issues green receipts recibos verdes for "opinion articles". In response, Pedro Almeida Vieira stated that were no legal irregularities and that Filipe Alves hid the correct values of visiting users pageviews of PáginaUm. In a response note, the Direction of DN stated that they "do not identify with the accusations".
