= Maria Rosa Colaço =

Portuguese writer, educationalist and journalist

Maria Rosa Colaço (1935 – 2004) was a Portuguese teacher, writer and journalist.

== Biography ==
Maria Rosa Parreiro Colaço was born in Torrão in the municipality of Alcácer do Sal in the Setúbal District of Portugal on 19 September 1935.

She trained to be a nurse at the Portuguese Institute of Oncology but then changed to training to be a primary school teacher in Évora.

After training she moved to the Portuguese colony of Mozambique, where she taught in Nampula, Beira and Lourenço Marques (now Maputo) and also wrote for the local newspapers Notícias da Beira and Notícias de Lourenço Marques. Four years after Mozambique's independence she returned to Portugal to teach and lived in Almada, on the left bank of the River Tagus, to the south of the Portuguese capital of Lisbon. With her husband, António Lille Delgado Malaquias de Lemos, she had three children.

Promoting the importance of reading in the development and education of children, Colaço was particularly identified with her book A Criança e a Vida (Child and Life), a collection of stories written by her primary school students in Mozambique, which was published in 1960 and has been translated into several other languages, and as a journalist, having a weekly column of chronicles about everyday life in the Lisbon-based newspaper, A Capital, as well as writing for several other newspapers including Diário de Notícias. She was an advisor to RTP (Rádio e Televisão de Portugal) on children´s television programmes, taking a course in screenplay writing. She was also associated with children’s theatre, her first play being written in 1958.

Colaço became known as a writer of children's books although she was never happy being called a writer of children's literature, saying that she was writing for all readers. In 1982 she won the Soeiro Pereira Gomes Prize for her book Gaivota. In 1989, she won the Alice Gomes Award from the Portuguese Association for Education through Art for the work Anjo Branco. She also prepared several texts for exhibition catalogues by artists and by the photographer Eduardo Gageiro, with whom she collaborated on Estas Crianças Aqui (These children here) in 1988.

Maria Rosa Colaço died on October 13, 2004. The annual Maria Rosa Colaço Literary Prize celebrates her work and she has also given her name to several roads in Portugal and to the public library in Torrão.
