= Eduardo Gageiro =

Portuguese photographer (1935–2025)

- Born: 16 February 1935; Sacavém, Portugal
- Died: 4 June 2025 (aged 90); Lisbon, Portugal
- Known for: Photography, photojournalism

Eduardo Gageiro (16 February 1935 – 4 June 2025) was a Portuguese photographer and photojournalist.

== Beginnings ==
Gageiro became interested in photography at a very early age whilst working at the Sacavém Factory, with the life of its workers providing the theme to his early pictures. The first photograph of him to be published appeared on the front page of the Diário de Notícias, of Lisbon, when Gageiro was twelve years old.

== Photographic career ==
Gageiro began his photojournalism career at Diário Ilustrado, later working for Vida Ribatejana, before joining weekly O Século in 1957. He later worked for Eva and also edited Sábado. He continued to work with various publications and press agencies into later life, mainly the Portuguese Associated Press.

As well as his photojournalist work, Gageiro produced several photobooks, often in collaboration with important Portuguese writers. He worked on Gente (1971), with José Cardoso Pires (whose introduction provides one of the earliest and most acute appraisals of Gageiro's work), on Lisboa Operária (1994), with David Mourão-Ferreira and, on Olhares (1999), with António Lobo Antunes. His book Lisboa no Cais da Memória (2003) reproduces some of the key images from these works and can be seen as an anthology of his work about Lisbon.

Gageiro saw worldwide exposure of his work when he photographed the events related to the Munich massacre that took place at the Olympic Games of 1972. He was also one of the main photographers of the events surrounding the Carnation Revolution in 1974, with Alfredo Cunha, such as the picture taken in the headquarters of the P.I.D.E. (Portugal's secret police), where he captured a young soldier taking down a portrait of former dictator Salazar. Gageiro was also the official photographer during Ramalho Eanes's Presidency.

== Travels and prizes ==
Gageiro photographed all around the world, including Cuba, where the Fidel Castro government allowed him to work with few restrictions, and East Timor, where he travelled to document life in the immediate post-independence period.

He received his first photographic prize in 1955. Thereafter, he went on to win more than 300 prizes around the world. In 2005 he was awarded first prize at the 11th International Photography Exhibition in China, the world's biggest photography competition.

== Influences ==
Gageiro's work is similar to that of the postwar French photographers Henri Cartier-Bresson, Robert Doisneau and Willy Ronis. The vicissitudes of daily life in all its monotony and the historical are recurring in his wide-ranging body of work. This does not mean that Gageiro's images are merely accurate snapshots, the decisive moment he tends to capture is often gently composed and finely balanced. True to this tradition, Gageiro worked exclusively in black and white.

Jorge Pedro Sousa, in his thesis on the history of photojournalism in Portugal characterised Gageiro's photographic practice by the same "aesthetic-compositional quality, human value and dramatic form" that are also found in W. Eugene Smith and Henri Cartier-Bresson.

== Death ==
Gageiro died on 4 June 2025, at the age of 90.

== Photobibliography ==
- Gente (1971), with text by José Cardoso Pires
- Mulher (1978), with text by Maria Velho da Costa
- O Sol, o Muro, o Mar (1984), with text by Sophia de Mello Breyner Andresen
- China: a contra revolução tranquila (1985), by Cáceres Monteiro
- Mulher (1988), with text by Maria Judite de Carvalho
- Estas Crianças Aqui (1988), with text by Maria Rosa Colaço
- Alentejo: Relógio de Sol (1988), with text by Miguel Torga
- Lisboa Operária (1994), with text by David Mourão-Ferreira
- Revelações (1996), with text by Mário Soares and Nuno Brederode Santos
- Évora: Património da Humanidade (1997), with text by José Saramago
- Fotos de Abril (1999), with text by 25 authors
- Olhares (1999), with text by António Lobo Antunes
- Timor - No Amanhecer da Esperança (2000), with text by 6 authors
- A Fábrica e Sacavém (2003), with text by three authors
- Lisboa no Cais da Memória (2003), with text by Jorge Sampaio e António Valdemar
- Fé - Olhares Sobre o Sagrado (2004), with text by José Mattoso
- Silêncios (2008), with text by Lídia Jorge
- Lisboa Amarga e Doce (2012), with text by António Costa and Baptista-Bastos
- Lisboa, Tejo e Tudo (2012)
- Liberdade (2013)
- Tudo Isto É Fado (2014)
