= João Galamba =

Portuguese economist and politician (born 1976)

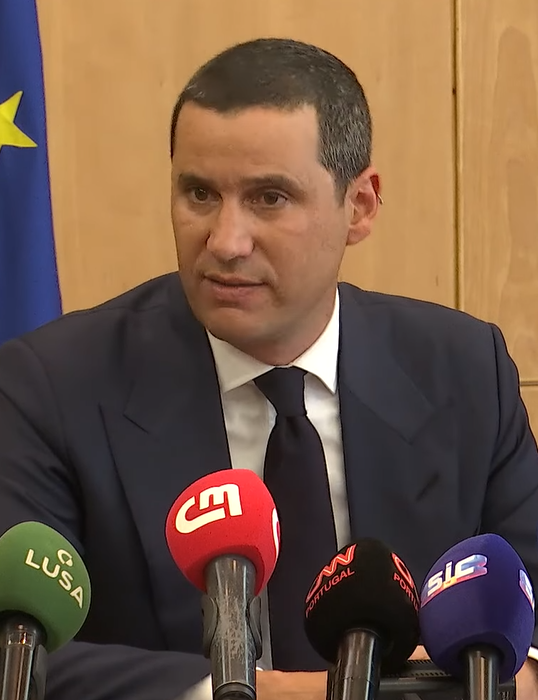
- Galamba in 2023

Minister of Infrastructure
- In office 4 January 2023 – 13 November 2023
- Prime Minister: António Costa
- Preceded by: Pedro Nuno Santos
- Succeeded by: António Costa

Personal details
- Born: 4 August 1976 (age 50) Lisbon, Portugal
- Party: Socialist Party
- Spouse: Laura Cravo (m. 2009)
- Children: 2

João Saldanha de Azevedo Galamba (born 4 August 1976) is a Portuguese economist and politician. A member of the Socialist Party, he served as Minister of Infrastructure in the XXIII Constitutional Government of Portugal, between January and November 2023.

Galamba was previously a deputy to the Assembly of the Republic and vice-president of the Socialist Party's parliamentary group. He served as Secretary of State for Energy in António Costa's first government, Deputy Minister and Secretary of State for Energy in Costa's second term, and Secretary of State for the Environment and Energy in the beginning of the third term.

Galamba has been named a formal suspect (arguido) in a corruption investigation regarding deals he was involved in during his time as Secretary of State. The political scandal led to the resignation of Prime Minister António Costa on 7 November 2023 and the fall of the government. Six days later, on 13 November 2023, Galamba resigned from his position as minister.

== Early life, education and career ==
João Galamba was born in Lisbon on 4 August 1976. He received a bachelor's degree in Economics from the Nova School of Business and Economics and was enrolled in a PhD in political science at London School of Economics, where he taught political philosophy in the Government department.

He worked at Santander Group and DiamondCluster International.

== Political career ==
Before accepting the position of Secretary of State, Galamba was vice-president of the Parliamentary group of the Socialist Party, and served as a deputy from 2009 until 2019. He also worked in the Portuguese Presidency of the Council of the European Union and in the Mission Unit for Integrated Continuous Care.

In 2014, as a deputy in the Assembly of the Republic, Galamba warned José Sócrates that he would be the target of “anything against him very quickly”, a warning that referred to Operation Marquês. In 2018, he stated before Parliament that the accusations of corruption and money laundering against the former prime minister shamed “any socialist”.

Between 2013 and 2018, he was a commentator on the socio-political debate program Sem Moderação - then broadcast on Canal Q and TSF and made available on the SAPO portal - where he worked until he joined the government of António Costa as a Secretary of State.

=== Secretary of State for Energy (2018–2023) ===
Galamba became Secretary of State of Energy in October 2018, during António Costa's first government. He was upgraded to Deputy Minister and Secretary of State for Energy in Costa's second term, from October 2019 to March 2022, working in the Ministry of the Environment and Climate Action. In Costa's third term, he started as Secretary of State for Energy and the Environment.

As Secretary of State, he was involved with the Public Prosecutor's Office, which investigated alleged irregularities in the concession for the exploration of lithium in Montalegre. He defended that “he would have committed a crime” if he had reversed the order that reported the approval of the concession of research and exploitation of lithium to LusoRecursos, and said that he did what he had been asked to do.

Following an episode of the RTP investigative journalism program Sexta às 9 about the Montalegre lithium mines, he posted on his Twitter account that the program was “manure” and a “disgusting thing”. The comments sparked criticism and condemnation from RTP and the Union of Journalists.

=== Minister of Infrastructure (2023) ===
After the resignation of the Minister of Infrastructure and Housing Pedro Nuno Santos, António Costa appointed Galamba as Minister of Infrastructure. His choice provoked harsh criticism from the leaders of the Social Democratic Party and Chega.

On 7 November 2023, Galamba was named a formal suspect (arguido) in Operation Influencer, a corruption investigation ordered by the Public Prosecution Service of Portugal, regarding several deals he was involved in during his time as Secretary of State. The political scandal led to the resignation of the Prime Minister, who is also under suspicion, and the fall of the government. On 13 November 2023, Galamba resigned from his position as minister.
