= Nome Mulher =

RTP television series

- Genre: Documentary
- Country of origin: Portugal
- Original language: Portuguese

Production
- Production company: Radiotelevisão Portuguesa

Original release
- Network: I Programa
- Release: 10 August 1974 – 2 March 1976

Nome Mulher (Woman's Name in Portuguese) was a pioneering women's issues television programme commissioned by Radiotelevisão Portuguesa (RTP) and aired on its I Programa in 1974, shortly after the Carnation Revolution. The series, hosted by journalists Maria Antónia Palla and Antónia de Sousa, debuted on 10 August 1974, featuring a documentary-style look at the lives of women in the small town of Monforte da Beira, Castelo Branco, and what their hopes and dreams were now that they lived in a "post-25 April world". The first episode produced, a look into the life of the esteemed journalist Maria Lamas, was the second to air, on 31 August 1974.

Nome Mulher aired for 46 semi-monthly installments, with the final installment focusing on the stories of the Local Ambulatory Support Service in the north of Portugal and the involvement of women in the Fundo de Fomento à Habitação (Housing Development Fund) in Porto, on 2 March 1976. After that broadcast, the programme was pulled from the schedule, never to return.

== Conception and controversy ==
Nome Mulher was part of a broader campaign at Radiotelevisão Portuguesa (RTP) to incorporate all Portuguese voices and opinions into its programming after the Carnation Revolution overthrew the Estado Novo regime on 25 April 1974. The Estado Novo regime sidelined women in many respects, teaching Portuguese women that their service in life was to be a good wife, good mother, and good Catholic. Overall RTP programming prior to the Carnation Revolution would have focused on promoting solely these attributes.

Two female journalists who had already received accolades for their work at home and abroad were Maria Antónia Palla and Antónia de Sousa, two of the three noted "Três Antónias" in Portugal's budding second-wave feminist movement. With the help of production cooperative Cinequipa and producers Fernando Matos Silva and João Matos Silva, Nome Mulher was conceptualized as a way for women to express themselves freely about the world they were now facing, and will face, now that the old regime was gone and Portugal was on a road to full representative democracy. Speaking on her work, Palla commented in 2017, "The project [Nome Mulher] involved making an inventory and debating women's problems and recording the most representative actions of their struggles during the revolutionary period. Sometimes, we approached a concrete case, other times, a thematic case. We talked about things that had never been discussed before: divorce, single mothers, de facto unions, et cetera."

The road to democracy was rocky in Portugal, with a coup attempt occurring on 28 September 1974. Nome Mulher, then a new programme, dedicated an episode which aired on 5 October profiling the role of women in preventing the coup attempt. The road ahead for Portugal was also filled with social change, with a December 1974 episode discussing the aforementioned topic of divorce, just before the Portuguese government reinstated its 1910 decision to allow all Portuguese, regardless of religion, the right to divorce.

Other controversial installments included the discussion previously mentioned by Palla regarding the plight of single mothers in contemporary Portugal (aired on 22 February 1975); what family planning means to Portuguese women, both rural and urban (aired on 18 March 1975); the right of women to vote, recently given to women regardless of literacy level, discussed with the help of noted feminist Elina Guimarães (aired on 15 April 1975); and a programme giving women the facts on abortion and contraception, with the help of medical professionals (airing on 14 June 1975). Nome Mulher was more than a hot-button issue programme, because it attempted to tackle not just these issues but also the standard of living for many Portuguese women. A 1974 series in which de Sousa and Palla visited Terceira in the Azores was well-received, as were reports on agricultural workers, women who worked in fishing, and a "diary" of the daily life of a woman who worked as a housekeeper.

== Cancellation and aftermath ==
On 4 February 1976, Nome Mulher aired a special called O Aborto não é um Crime (Abortion is Not a Crime). The title was chosen deliberately, as abortion was indeed a crime under Portuguese law and would continue to be so until 2007. The episode focused on a clandestine group in the Lisbon area (with all of the attendees and participants using only first names) who facilitated illegal abortions. These people, who had studied midwifery, abortion, and reproductive health, but did not possess doctor of medicine degrees and credentials themselves, offered their services to interested parties and typically did not involve doctors because they felt the method of abortion used, the vacuum aspiration method, was not a "medical act", therefore bypassing the need for a doctor in such a scenario. The clandestine group also offered references to medical aftercare and even provided psychological services to women post-abortion.

While Nome Mulher was controversial in the past, this particular special, which included footage of a woman aborting her pregnancy via the vacuum aspiration method in a clinic setting in Cova da Piedade, caused a national uproar. Conservative political groups joined forces to denounce the programme, and even the Socialist Party in power at the time felt compelled to stay silent. One Socialist politician, speaking on condition of anonymity to The New York Times, said that while the party overall agreed with Palla's stances, the timing of the programme was inopportune as it came up unexpectedly in the weeks leading up to the 1976 Portuguese legislative election, potentially hurting their chances at the polls. There were calls for the head of RTP at the time, Manuel Pedroso Marques, to cancel the series, which only further complicated matters as he was (and still is today) the husband of Maria Antónia Palla. The Porto Fundo de Fomento à Habitação story, which had already been produced and completed, was allowed to air on 2 March 1976, but afterward, Marques pulled the programme for good.

Shortly after the programme's broadcast, Maternidade Alfredo da Costa, Lisbon's leading maternity hospital, filed charges against Palla for "offense to public morals" and "illegal practice of medicine". Palla argued that she never made an on-air statement endorsing nor rebuking abortion and that the point of the programme in question was to highlight how easy and relatively safe it was to obtain an abortion in Portugal, in spite of its illegality. Palla alleged that in 1976, abortions in Portugal could be obtained with the absolute minimum of hygiene standards met for just 500 escudos ($18.50 in 1976 U.S. dollars and $98.90 in 2023 dollars, or approximately €90 in 2023 euro valuations), with more state-of-the-art, luxury treatment available for 5,000 escudos ($185 in 1976 U.S. dollars, or $989 / €900 in 2023 values). Nevertheless, Palla was brought to trial in Lisbon in 1979. She was eventually acquitted of all charges.
