= Orlando da Costa =

Portuguese writer (1929–2006)

- Born: Orlando António Fernandes da Costa; July 1929; Lourenço Marques, Portuguese Mozambique
- Died: 27 January 2006 (aged 76–77)
- Occupation: Writer
- Spouse: Maria Antónia Palla (divorced)
- Children: Antonio Costa (son)
- Relatives: Sérgio Vieira (cousin)

Orlando António Fernandes da Costa (July 1929 − 27 January 2006) was a Portuguese writer of Goan paternal and Portuguese-French maternal descent whose writings express his experiences of life in Goa. According to Everton Machado, his book O Último Olhar de Manú Miranda is a good introduction to know Indo-Portuguese literature. He was the father of the current President of the European Council and the former Portuguese Prime Minister Antonio Costa, by his first wife Maria Antónia Palla. Costa was maternal cousin to Sérgio Vieira, a politician in Mozambique.

== Biography ==
After being raised in Margão, Portuguese Goa, Costa spent in the 1950s, most of his time in Casa dos Estudantes do Império, an institution mainly built to house students from the Portuguese colonies that were studying in the metropole. There, he came in contact with many of the future leaders of the nationalist movements of the colonies, such as the MPLA, the FRELIMO and the PAIGC. Between 1950 and 1953, he was arrested three times by the Salazar government. A few days before he died, on January 5, 2006, he received from Jorge Sampaio's hands the degree of Commander of the Order of Liberty.

== Bibliography ==
- 1951 − A Estrada e a Voz
- 1953 − Os Olhos sem Fronteira
- 1955 − Sete Odes do Canto Comum
- 1961 − O Signo da Ira
- 1964 − Podem Chamar-me Eurídice
- 1971 − Sem Flores nem Coroas
- 1979 − Canto Civil
- 1984 − A Como Estão os Cravos Hoje?
- 1994 − Os Netos de Norton
- 2000 − O Último Olhar de Manú Miranda
