= Corruption in Portugal =

Corruption in Portugal describes the prevention and occurrence of corruption in Portugal. In 2013, a report by Transparency International revealed that political parties, the Parliament, the judiciary and the military are the most corrupt institutions in Portugal. Transparency International's 2025 Corruption Perceptions Index ranks the country's public sector in 46th place out of 180 countries in the Index.

== Extent ==
Transparency International’s Global Corruption Barometer 2013 reveals that political parties, Parliament, the judiciary and the military are the most corrupt institutions in Portugal.

Transparency International's 2025 Corruption Perceptions Index scored Portugal at 56 on a scale from 0 ("highly corrupt") to 100 ("very clean"). When ranked by score, Portugal ranked 46th among the 180 countries in the Index, where the country ranked first is perceived to have the most honest public sector. For comparison with regional scores, the best score among Western European and European Union countries (Note: Austria, Belgium, Bulgaria, Croatia, Cyprus, Czechia, Denmark, Estonia, Finland, France, Germany, Greece, Hungary, Iceland, Ireland, Italy, Latvia, Lithuania, Luxembourg, Malta, Netherlands, Norway, Poland, Portugal, Romania, Slovakia, Slovenia, Spain, Sweden, Switzerland, and the United Kingdom.) was 89, the average score was 64 and the worst score was 40. For comparison with worldwide scores, the best score was 89 (ranked 1), the average score was 42, and the worst score was 9 (ranked 181, in a two-way tie).

The exposure of high-profile corruption cases in the media and the limited political engagement has contributed to poor public perception of political corruption in Portugal. Recurring corruption scandals involving high-level politicians, local administrators and businesses abusing public funds have revealed that safeguards to counter corruption and abuse of power have been relatively inefficient, according to the National Integrity System Assessment 2012 by the Portuguese chapter of Transparency International (TIAC).

Regarding business and corruption, several sources indicate that corruption plays a limited role in Portugal's business culture. Foreign companies reportedly encounter limited corruption, but they do not consider corruption an obstacle to foreign direct investment. The EU report on corruption revealed that the Portuguese perceive a high level of corruption (with 90% answering that corruption is widespread, compared to an EU average of 76%). However, the same report reveals that, when asked if they had actually witnessed corruption, only 1% responded positively (with an EU average of 5%).

== See also ==
- Crime in Portugal
- Police corruption in Portugal
- International Anti-Corruption Academy
- Group of States Against Corruption
- International Anti-Corruption Day
- ISO 37001 Anti-bribery management systems
- United Nations Convention against Corruption
- OECD Anti-Bribery Convention
- Transparency International
- Corruption Perception Index
