= PREC =

PREC may refer to:

- Puerto Rico Energy Commission, a government agency in Puerto Rico
- Processo Revolucionário Em Curso, a tumultuous period in 1975 during the Portuguese transition to democracy
