= Antena 1 =

Antena 1 may refer to:

- Antena 1 (Portugal), a Portuguese radio station
- Antena 1 (Romania), a Romanian TV channel
