= Público =

Público may refer to:

- Público (Portugal), a Portuguese newspaper
- Público (Spain), a Spanish newspaper launched in September 2007
- a system of land transport in Puerto Rico system, similar to share taxis
