= António Costa =

President of the European Council since 2024

His Excellency António Costa GCC GCIH
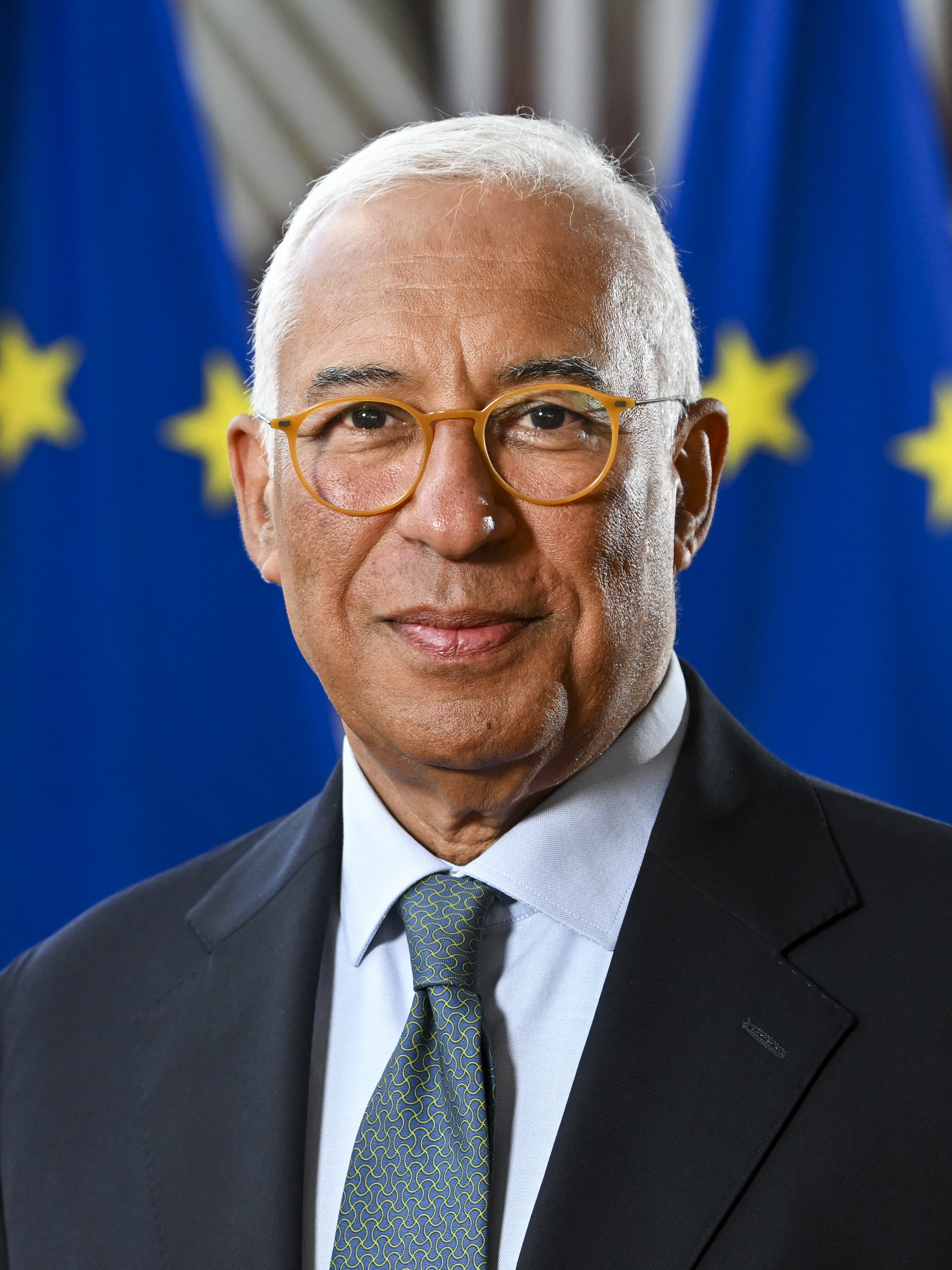
- Official portrait, 2024

President of the European Council
- Incumbent
- Assumed office 1 December 2024
- Preceded by: Charles Michel

Prime Minister of Portugal
- In office 26 November 2015 – 2 April 2024
- President: Aníbal Cavaco Silva; Marcelo Rebelo de Sousa
- Preceded by: Pedro Passos Coelho
- Succeeded by: Luís Montenegro

Secretary-General of the Socialist Party
- In office 22 November 2014 – 7 January 2024
- President: Carlos César
- Deputy: Ana Catarina Mendes; José Luís Carneiro; João Torres
- Preceded by: António José Seguro
- Succeeded by: Pedro Nuno Santos

Leader of the Opposition
- In office 22 November 2014 – 26 November 2015
- Prime Minister: Pedro Passos Coelho
- Preceded by: António José Seguro
- Succeeded by: Pedro Passos Coelho
Other offices
Mayor of Lisbon
In office 1 August 2007 – 6 April 2015
| Preceded by | Carmona Rodrigues |
| Succeeded by | Fernando Medina |
Minister of Internal Administration
In office 12 March 2005 – 17 May 2007
| Prime Minister | José Sócrates |
| Preceded by | Daniel Sanches |
| Succeeded by | Rui Pereira |
Minister of Justice
In office 25 October 1999 – 6 April 2002
| Prime Minister | António Guterres |
| Preceded by | José Vera Jardim |
| Succeeded by | Celeste Cardona |
Minister of Parliamentary Affairs
In office 27 November 1997 – 25 October 1999
| Prime Minister | António Guterres |
| Preceded by | António Couto dos Santos |
| Succeeded by | Luís Marques Mendes |
Member of the Assembly of the Republic
In office 23 October 2015 – 26 March 2024
| Constituency | Lisbon |
In office 5 April 2002 – 9 March 2005
| Constituency | Leiria |
In office 4 November 1991 – 26 October 1995
| Constituency | Lisbon |
Member of the European Parliament
In office 20 July 2004 – 11 March 2005
| Constituency | Portugal |

Personal details
- Born: António Luís Santos da Costa; 17 July 1961 (age 65) Lisbon, Portugal
- Citizenship: Portuguese
- Party: Socialist (since 1975)
- Height: 1.66 m (5 ft 5 in)
- Spouse: Fernanda Tadeu (m. 1987)
- Children: 2
- Parents: Orlando da Costa (father); Maria Antónia Palla (mother)
- Education: University of Lisbon
- Website: portugal.gov.pt/pm

Military service
- Branch/service: Portuguese Army

António Luís Santos da Costa (Note: European Portuguese: [ɐ̃ˈtɔni.u ˈkɔʃtɐ, ɐ̃ˈtɔnju -]) GCC GCIH (born 17 July 1961) is a Portuguese lawyer and politician who has served as president of the European Council since 2024. He previously served as prime minister of Portugal from 2015 to 2024 and secretary-general of the Socialist Party from 2014 to 2024.

Born in Lisbon, Costa was secretary of State for Parliamentary Affairs from 1995 to 1997, minister of Parliamentary Affairs from 1997 to 1999, minister of Justice from 1999 to 2002, minister of Home Affairs from 2005 to 2007, as well as mayor of Lisbon from 2007 to 2015.

Costa was elected secretary-general of the Socialist Party in 2014. Costa's near nine-year tenure as prime minister is the second longest, with Costa also being the longest-serving politician in government functions, in Portuguese democracy, as well as the second longest of any Iberian Peninsula national leader in the 21st century. On 7 November 2023, Costa resigned following an investigation involving members of his government in connection with alleged corruption and malfeasance in handling lithium mining and hydrogen projects in the country. The president of Portugal decided to dissolve Parliament and called for a snap election. Costa stayed as prime minister in a caretaker capacity until 2 April 2024, when he was succeeded by Luís Montenegro.

In December 2024, Costa succeeded Charles Michel as president of the European Council. As president of the European Council, Costa reaffirmed support for Ukraine during the Russian invasion of Ukraine.

== Early life and education ==
Born in the parish of São Sebastião da Pedreira in Lisbon, António Costa has Indian roots, of Goan origin, on his father's side. In Goa, Costa is affectionately known as Babush, a word in Konkani meaning 'a young loved one'. He is the son of the advertising professional and writer, as well as a prominent member of the Portuguese Communist Party, Orlando da Costa (himself the son of a Catholic Goan man and, on his mother's side, the grandson of a French woman, a direct male-line descendant of Marada Poi, a 16th-century Gaud Saraswat Brahmin), and his first wife, the journalist Maria Antónia Palla, first woman to join the leadership of the Portuguese Journalists' Union.

Costa graduated from the Faculty of Law of the University of Lisbon in the 1980s when he first entered politics and was elected as a Socialist deputy to the municipal council. He completed the mandatory military service in 1987 and later practised law briefly from 1988, before entering politics full-time.

== Political career ==
António Costa joined the Socialist Youth in 1975, at the age of 14. In the 1982 local elections, Costa was elected as a member of the Lisbon municipal assembly, being re-elected in 1985 and 1989. In the 1991 legislative election, Costa was elected as member of the Assembly of the Republic from the district of Lisbon.

For the 1993 local elections, Costa was picked as the mayoral candidate for the municipality of Loures, a suburb of Lisbon. This contest threw national attention because Costa did a campaign stunt by promoting a race between a Ferrari and a donkey to highlight the difficulty in roads and transportation to Lisbon, and to point for the necessity of better roads and a subway connection to Loures. Costa narrowly lost the mayoral race to the Unitary Democratic Coalition (CDU) candidate by a 35 to 34 percent margin.

In the 1996 presidential election, António Costa was the campaign director of Jorge Sampaio's successful run for the Presidency of the Republic. Costa's first role in a Socialist government was as Minister of Parliamentary Affairs under Prime Minister António Guterres between 1997 and 1999. In Guterres' second term, Costa held the office of Minister of Justice from 1999 to 2002. Costa also coordinated the organization of the Expo '98 in Lisbon.

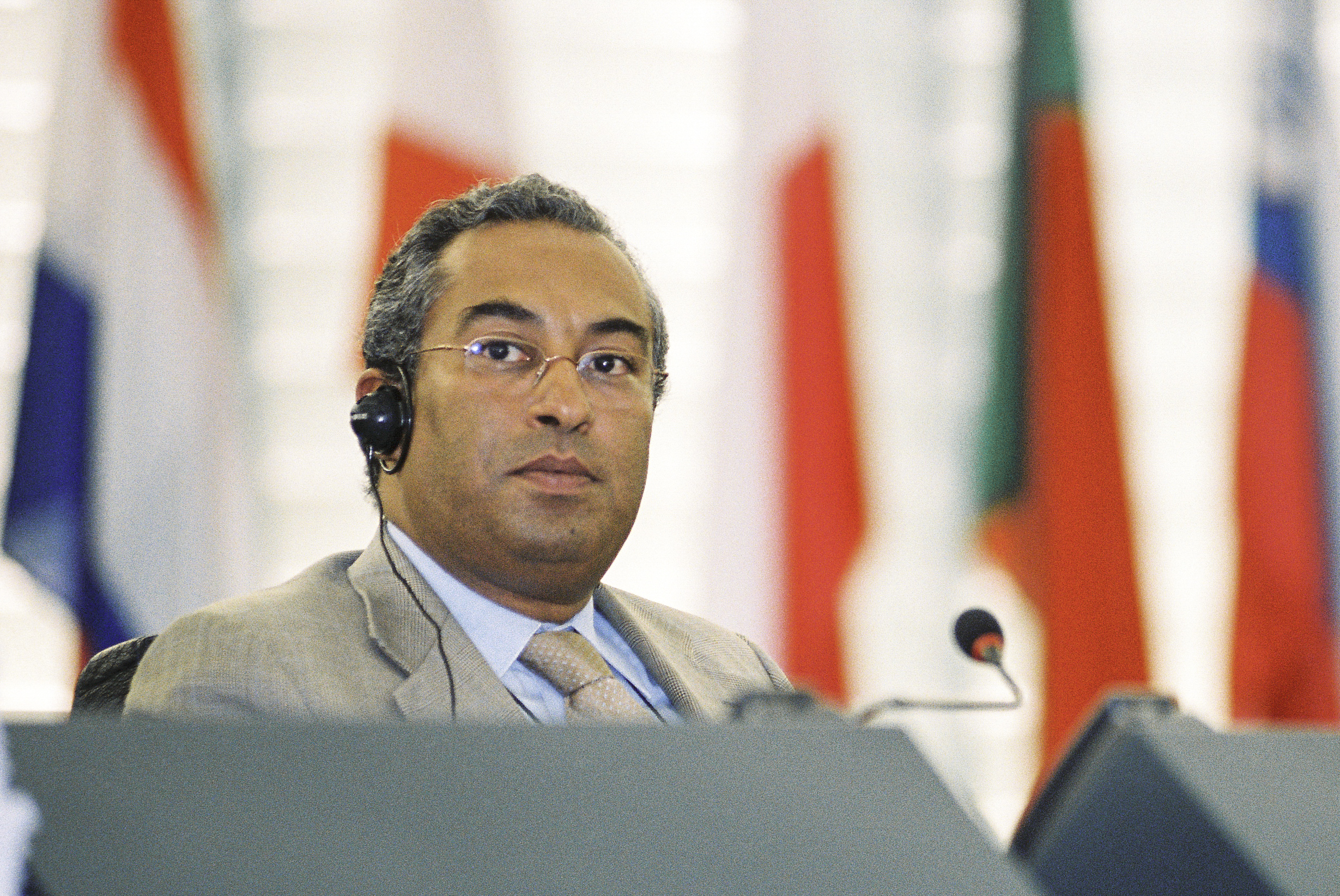
Costa in 2004

In the 2002 legislative election, Costa was elected a member of parliament from the district of Leiria and, due to the defeat of the PS in this election, became the party's parliamentary leader in opposition. During the 2003 Casa Pia child sexual abuse scandal, António Costa's name was involved in wiretaps where he appears to want to interfere with the Public Prosecutor's Office to avoid the arrest of the PS deputy Paulo Pedroso. Costa was a member of the European Parliament for the Socialist Party (Party of European Socialists), heading the list for the 2004 European elections after the death of top candidate António de Sousa Franco. On 20 July 2004, he was elected as one of the 14 vice-presidents of the European Parliament. He also served on the Committee on Civil Liberties, Justice and Home Affairs. Costa would remain a member of the Party of European Socialists (PES) coalition.

Costa resigned as an MEP on 11 March 2005 to become Minister of State and Internal Administration in the government of José Sócrates following the 2005 national elections.

=== Mayor of Lisbon ===
António Costa resigned from all government offices in May 2007 to become his party's candidate for the municipality of Lisbon, Portugal's capital city. He was elected as Lisbon's mayor on 15 July 2007 and reelected in 2009 and 2013, with a bigger majority each time. In April 2015, he resigned his duties as mayor, while he was already the secretary general of the Socialist Party and the party's candidate for prime minister, so that he could prepare his campaign for the October 2015 general elections.

=== Candidate for prime minister ===
In September 2014, the Socialist Party chose Costa as its candidate to be prime minister of Portugal in the 2015 national elections. In a ballot to select the party's candidate, gaining nearly 70 percent of the votes, he defeated party leader António José Seguro, who announced his resignation after the result. By April 2015, he stepped down as mayor to focus on his campaign.

During the campaign, Costa pledged to ease back on austerity and give more disposable income back to households. He proposed to boost incomes, hiring and growth to cut the budget deficits while scrapping austerity measures and cutting taxes for the middle and lower classes, asserting that would still allow deficits to reduce in line with the Euro convergence criteria. Also, he pledged to roll back a hugely unpopular hike in value added tax on restaurants and reinstate some benefits for civil servants.

== Prime Minister of Portugal ==
=== First term (2015–2019) ===
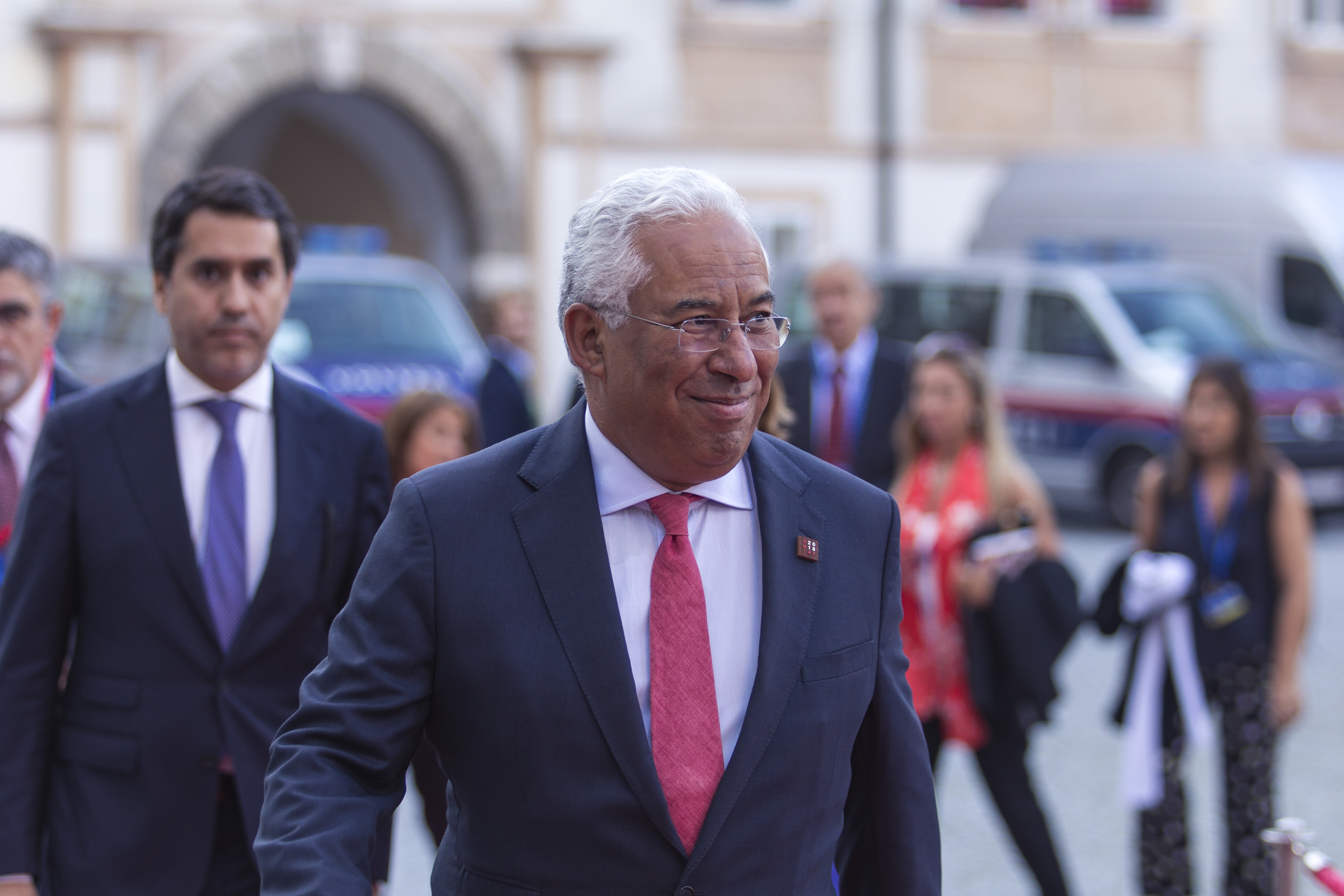
Costa at the Informal EU-Leaders' Meeting in Salzburg in 2018

On 4 October 2015, the conservative Portugal Ahead coalition that had ruled the country since 2011 came first in the elections, winning 38.6% of the vote, while the Socialist Party (PS) came second with 32.3%. Passos Coelho was reappointed prime minister the following days, but António Costa formed an alliance with the other parties on the left (the Left Bloc, the Portuguese Communist Party and the Ecologist Party "The Greens"), which altogether constituted a majority in Parliament, and toppled the government on 10 November (the People–Animals–Nature party also voted in favour of the motion of rejection presented by the left alliance). After toppling the conservative government, Costa was chosen as the new prime minister of Portugal by President Cavaco Silva on 24 November and assumed office on 26 November.

By March 2017, polls put support for Costa's Socialists at 42 per cent, up 10 points from their share of the vote in the 2015 election and close to a level that would give them a majority in parliament were the country to vote again. In the 2017 local elections, Costa further consolidated power in Portugal as his party captured a record haul of 158 town halls out of the country's 308 cities and towns; nationwide, the Socialists’ vote share topped 38 per cent, again up from their result in the 2015 parliamentary election.

During his tenure, Portugal experienced its deadliest wildfires ever, firstly in Pedrogão Grande in June 2017 (65 dead) and later across the country in October 2017 (41 dead). In October 2017, the opposition People's Party (CDS) launched a motion of no-confidence in Costa's government over its failure to prevent the loss of human lives in the lethal Iberian wildfires, the second such disaster in four months; the motion was largely symbolic as the minority Socialist government continued to be backed in parliament by two left-wing parties.

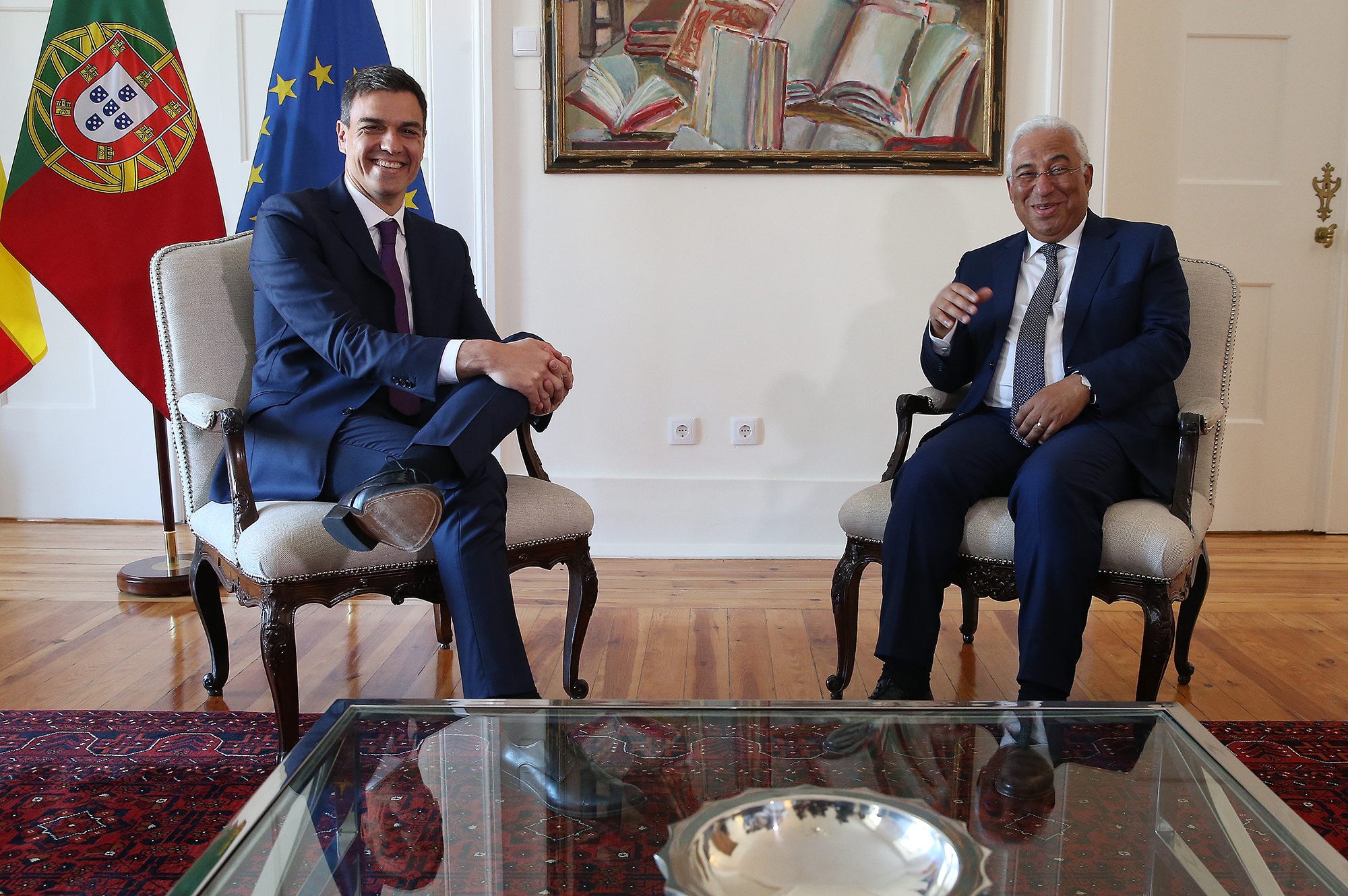
Costa with Spanish Prime Minister Pedro Sánchez in Lisbon, 2 July 2018

In April 2018, Reuters reported that, "Since coming to power, Costa's government has managed to combine fiscal discipline with measures to support growth, while reversing most of the austerity policies imposed by the previous centre-right administration during the 2010–13 debt crisis. Various reforms were also carried out during Costa’s first term in office, including social protection for children, free books for all students up until the age of 18, far cheaper public transport tickets, and a social electricity price; with lower bills for low-income families.

In early 2019, Costa's government survived another opposition motion of no confidence lodged over a wave of public sector strikes. Ahead of the 2019 national elections, Costa ruled out a coalition government with the hard left if, as expected, his governing party won the election but fell shy of a parliamentary majority. Instead, he indicated he favoured a continuation of the current pact in parliament with the Communists and/or the Left Bloc rather than any formal coalition in which they would have government ministers.

=== Second term (2019–2022) ===
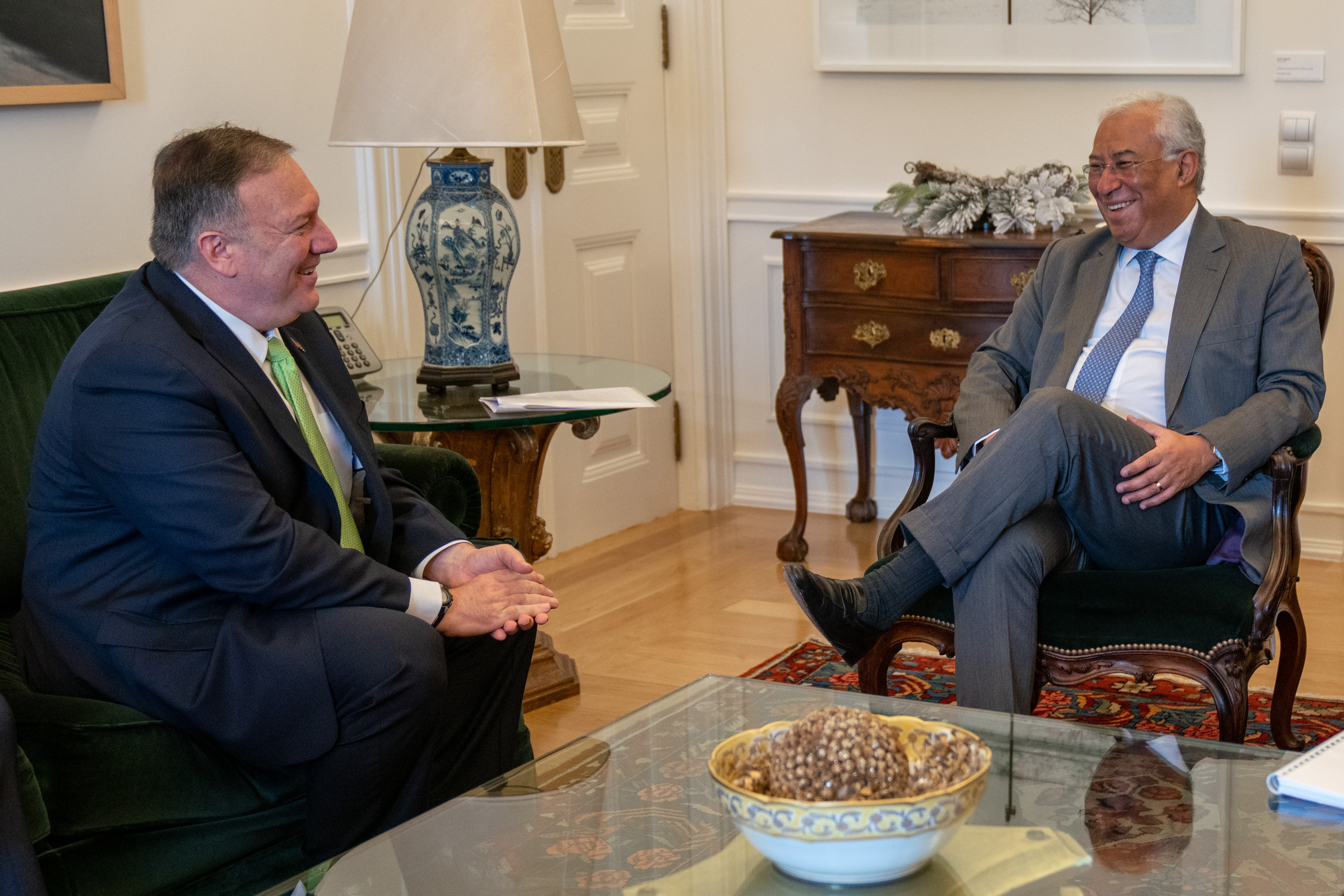
Costa meets with U.S. Secretary of State Mike Pompeo in Lisbon, Portugal on 5 December 2019.

Costa's second government was sworn in on 26 October 2019, the biggest government in Portuguese democracy, with 70 members: 20 ministers, including the prime minister, and 50 secretaries of state. This government would prove to be very unstable due to the lack of an agreement between the left-wing parties, and, in the vote of the 2020 budget, BE and CDU abstained while the Socialists were the only party voting in favour.

Despite the political instability from the lack of an agreement, the XXII government was dominated by the COVID-19 pandemic. The first case appeared on 2 March 2020, and shortly after, the government declared a state of emergency, which was signed by the President, and a lockdown was also issued. The lockdown and restrictions were lifted in June 2020, but new measures would be enacted in the following months as infections and deaths rose. By mid-2022, Portugal had become one of the worst affected countries in the world by the pandemic, with a death rate of 25.8 per 1 million, and an infection rate of 1,090 per 1 million. The Covid vaccination campaign in Portugal, led by Admiral Henrique Gouveia e Melo, which was nominated by the government, was a major success with more than 28 million vaccines given and nearly 9 million people fully vaccinated (85% of the population), one of the highest rates in the world.

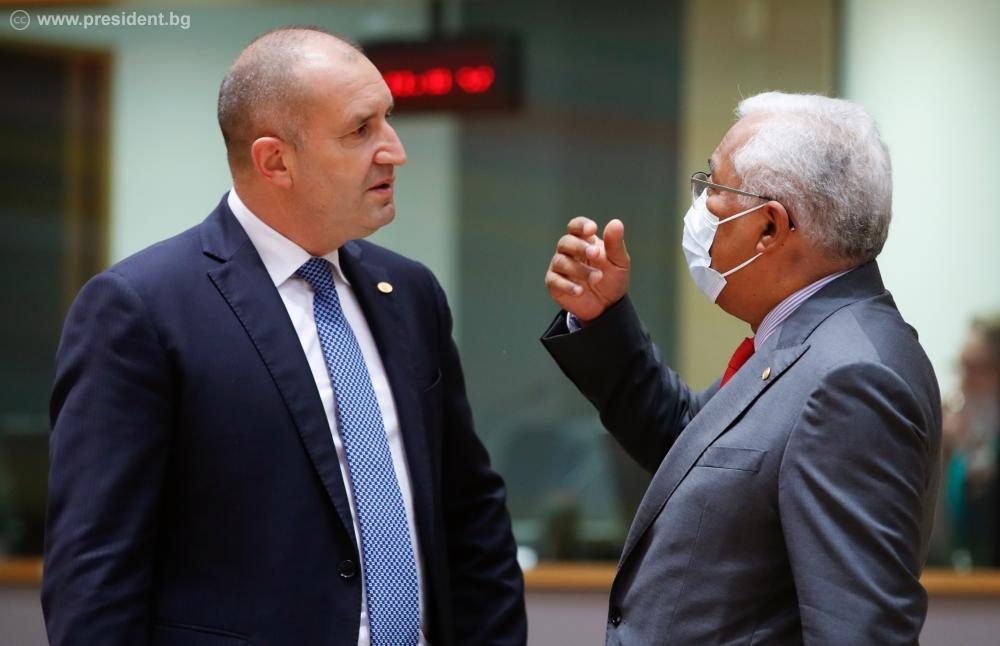
Costa with Bulgarian President Rumen Radev in the European Council Summit in Brussels, 22 October 2021

Between 1 January and 30 June 2021, António Costa presided over the Council of the European Union. In the 2021 local elections, the Socialist Party remained the largest party in the country but suffered heavy losses in several cities, especially Lisbon, which was lost to a centre-right coalition. The results were seen as a "yellow card" to António Costa. At the same time, the left-wing parties, BE and CDU, were threatening to reject the 2022 budget if Costa's government didn't make more concessions. The President warned that budget rejection would lead to snap elections, which ultimately happened as the left-wing parties joined forces with the right-wing and rejected the 2022 budget, the first rejection in democracy. Snap elections were called for 30 January 2022.

Further reforms were carried out during Costa’s second term, including a new housing and urban planning law, the extension of free early childhood education and care to all vulnerable children, extended bereavement leave, and a duty on employers “to refrain from contacting employees outside regular working hours.”

=== Third term (2022–2024) ===
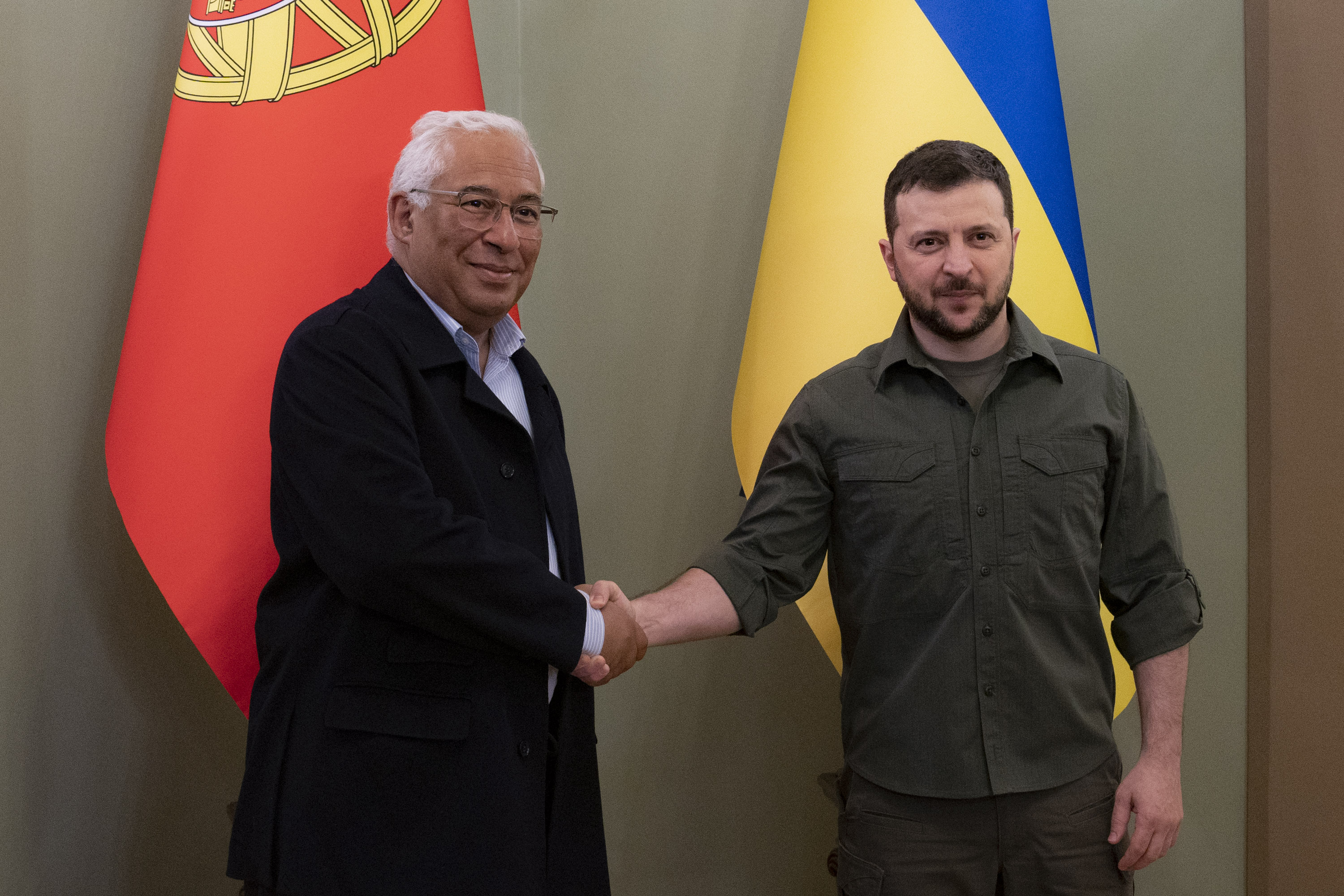
Costa with Ukrainian President Volodymyr Zelenskyy on 21 May 2022

Costa was re-elected in the 2022 Portuguese legislative election, with the PS winning 120 seats, up from 108 seats, in a surprise outright majority in the Assembly. In the weeks leading up to the election, polling suggested that Costa and the Socialist Party would retain their status as the largest party in the Assembly but would need the help of other parties to achieve a majority. In his victory speech, Costa thanked voters for giving him "an increased responsibility" and promising to govern "with and for all Portuguese". This gave him the mandate to form the XXIII Constitutional Government of Portugal.

During Costa's third term, several amendments were made to the Portuguese Labour Code. The third term was marred by a wave of scandals and resignations that affected Costa's popularity negatively in the opinion polls. 11 ministers and secretaries of state left their roles, over allegations of corruption and past misconduct or questionable practices. The most significant scandal was the TAP scandal where Costa's government has been involved. Infrastructure Minister Pedro Nuno Santos submitted his resignation in December 2022, following a public backlash over a hefty severance pay a secretary of state received from state-owned TAP, which fell under his remit.

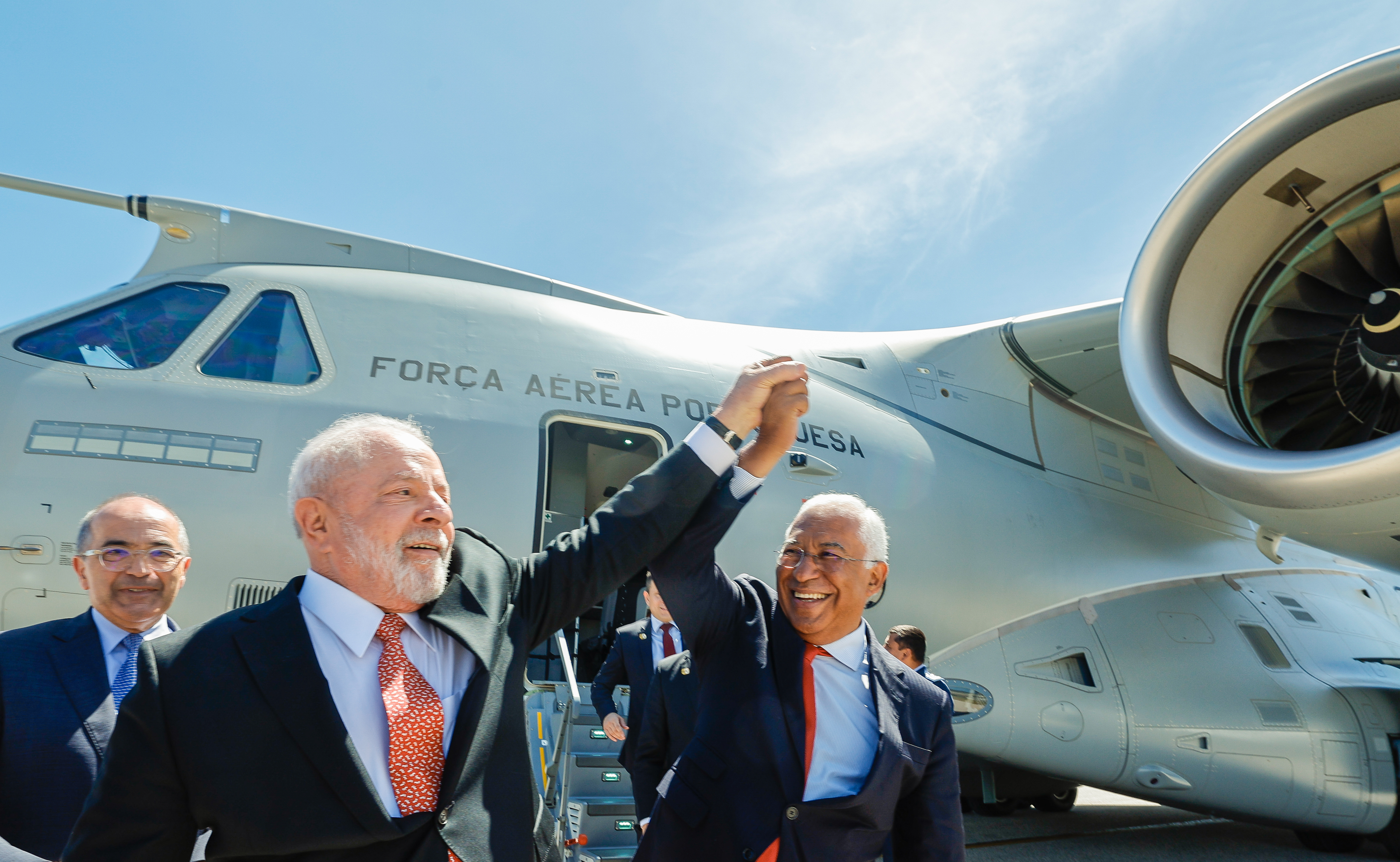
Costa with Brazilian President Luiz Inácio Lula da Silva on 24 April 2023

Costa replaced Santos with João Galamba, who submitted his resignation in May 2023 as the TAP scandal widened. Opposition parties said that Galamba concealed from parliament that he had proposed that then TAP CEO Christine Ourmières-Widener meet Socialist lawmakers to prepare for a parliamentary hearing about her severance package. Widener was later fired after an official inspection found that the severance was illegal. Galamba initially said the preparatory meeting was TAP's idea, but acknowledged it was he who had told Widener that, if she wanted, she could attend the meeting where his advisors would also be present.

Galamba stated that one of his advisors, who took notes on what was discussed at the meeting, had been fired and taken a laptop with confidential information with him. The laptop was later recovered by the national intelligence service SIS, leading to accusations from the opposition of government overreach since such cases were a police matter. Costa denied that either he or any member of the government had given orders to SIS to recover the laptop. He stated that he would reject the resignation of Galamba, keeping him in the job against president Marcelo Rebelo de Sousa's and the opposition's request. President Rebelo de Sousa responded by issuing a warning that Costa's government needed to work on preserving its credibility, while refraining from using his power to dissolve parliament.

==== Resignation ====
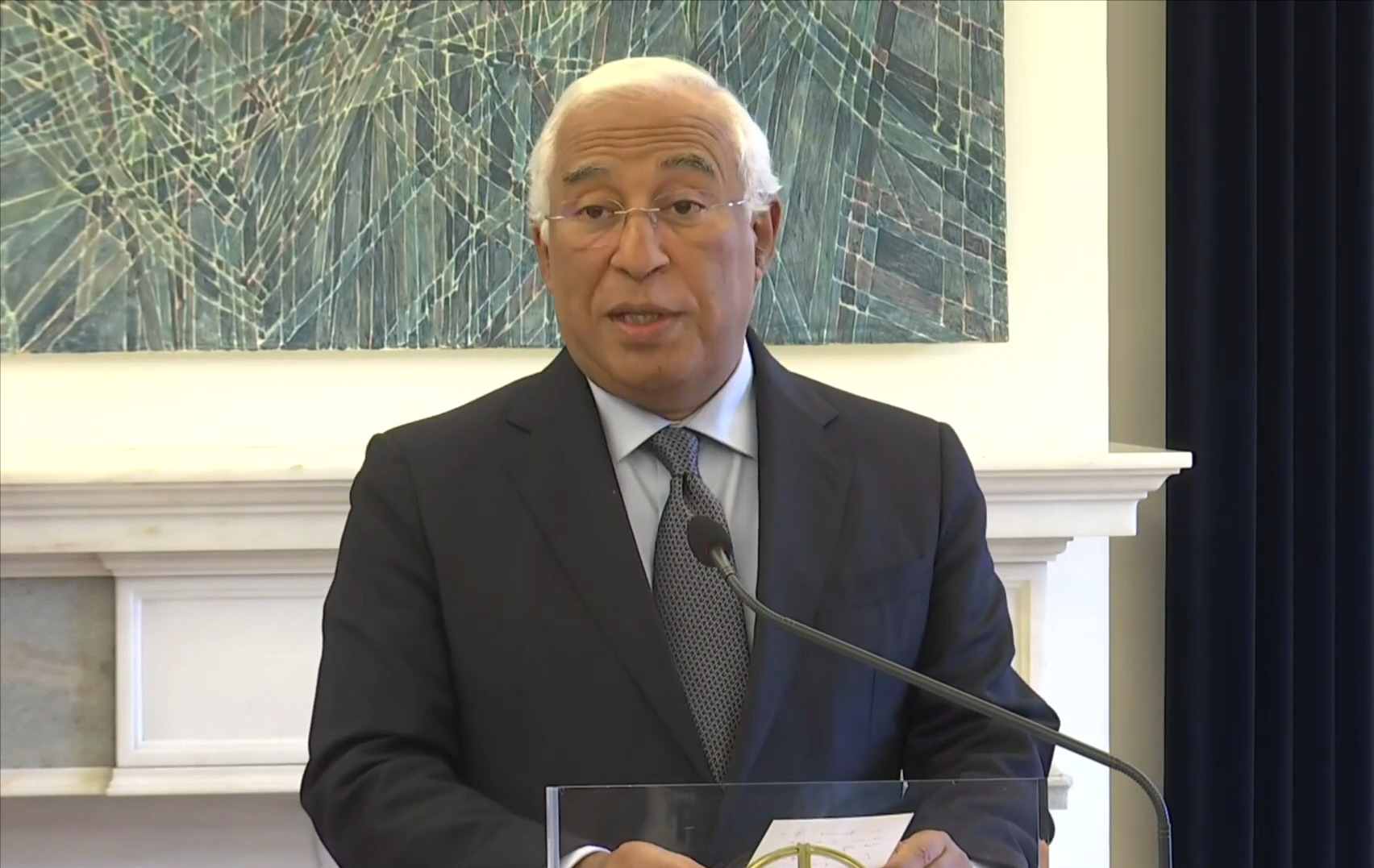
Costa announcing his resignation, on 7 November 2023

On 7 November 2023, Portuguese prosecutors detained Costa's chief of staff Vítor Escária and named João Galamba a formal suspect in an investigation into alleged corruption in lithium mining, green hydrogen production and a data centre deals. Over 40 searches were carried out, some of which in government and local government buildings, including Escária's office, the Ministry of Infrastructure and the Ministry of the Environment and Climate Action. Costa was also under suspicion of enabling the lithium and green hydrogen deals, and was to be inquired by the Supreme Court of Justice.

In a televised statement in the afternoon, Costa announced his resignation from the position of prime minister, saying that "the dignity of the functions of prime minister is not compatible with any suspicion about his integrity, his good conduct and even less with the suspicion of the practice of any criminal act".

The President of the Republic, Marcelo Rebelo de Sousa, accepted Costa's resignation on the same day. However, the resignation of Costa and his government was only made official on 8 December, to have the State Budget for 2024 approved. The Assembly of the Republic was also dissolved. The president scheduled early elections to be held on 10 March 2024. Costa's government remained in office in a caretaker capacity until the new government (led by Luis Montenegro) was sworn in after the elections.

The investigation attracted criticism after the prosecutors admitted several mistakes, including confusion between the names of António Costa and then Minister of Economy António Costa Silva in the transcript of a wiretap.

Costa became the second-longest-serving Portuguese prime minister during Portuguese democracy. He was also the second longest-serving head of government among all national leaders of the Iberian Peninsula in the 21st century.

== President of the European Council ==
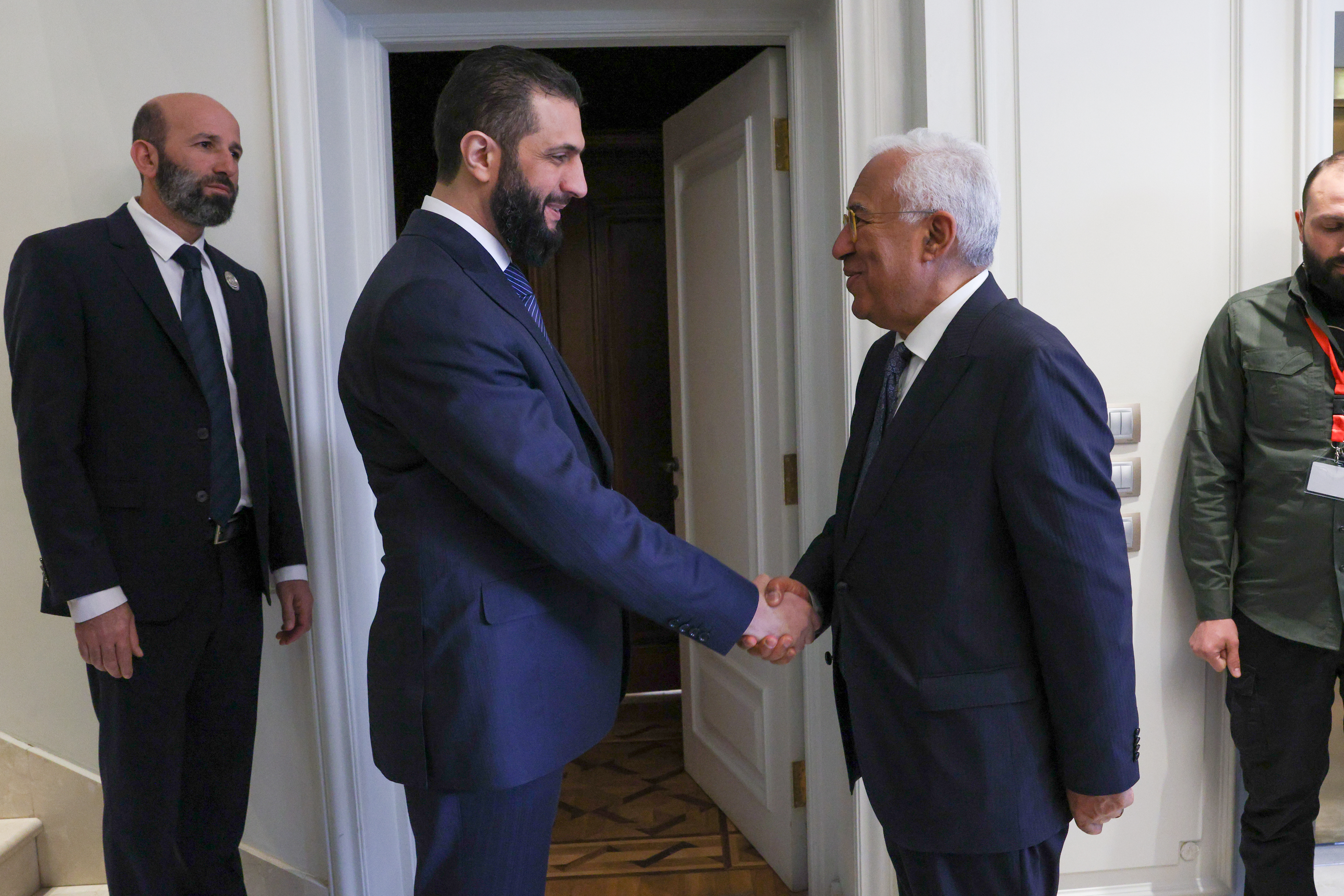
Costa with Syrian President Ahmed al-Sharaa at the Emergency Summit of the League of Arab States on Gaza, 3 March 2025

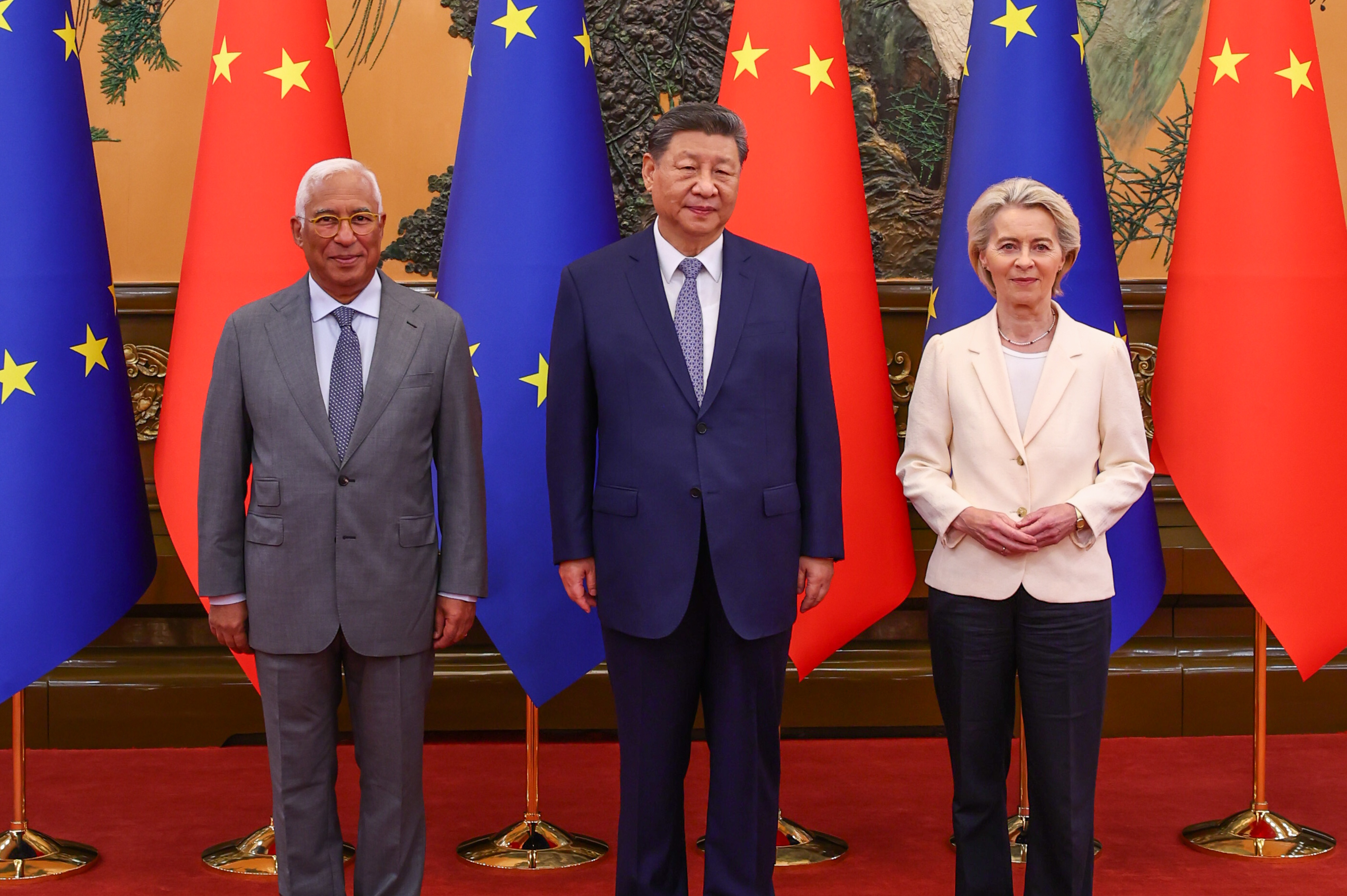
António Costa with Ursula von der Leyen and Chinese leader Xi Jinping in Beijing, China, 24 July 2025

In the aftermath of the 2024 European Parliament election, Costa was seen as the frontrunner candidate for the Presidency of the European Council. On 27 June 2024, António Costa was elected as President of the European Council, one of the three most important leadership posts of the European Union, by the 27 EU member state leaders. He started in the position on 1 December 2024. Costa is the first person of colour to occupy a top EU position.

As President of the European Council, Costa reaffirmed support for the Ukrainian government of Volodymyr Zelenskyy on the third anniversary of the 2022 Russian invasion of Ukraine.

In March 2025, Costa met in the Egyptian capital, Cairo, with Syrian President Ahmed al-Sharaa.

At the 2025 EU-China Summit, Costa and Commission President Ursula von der Leyen stated that China's support for Russia's invasion of Ukraine posed a direct threat to European security. They further stated that Beijing's position on the war would influence future EU-China relations.

In January 2026, Costa joined von der Leyen and Indian Prime Minister Narendra Modi in announcing that India and the European Union had reached a comprehensive free trade agreement covering a market of around two billion people. The agreement was accompanied by measures intended to facilitate mobility for skilled workers and students.

In mid June 2026 the 27 states of the European Union agreed to extend the sanctions against Russia because of its war against Ukraine for another 12 month, meant as a clear signal to ruler Vladimir Putin. According to a report Costa disregarded that effort and approached Moscow directly by having his Chief of Staff Pedro Lourtie call the Russians, without clear mandate to do so, causing a diplomatic fall out with European leaders: Amongst others, Chancellor of Germany Friedrich Merz and the President of France Emmanuel Macron voiced their anger with Costa.

== Personal life ==
In 1987, Costa married Fernanda Maria Gonçalves Tadeu, a teacher. The couple have a son and a daughter. Since 2017, Costa holds an Overseas Citizenship of India.

Costa is a supporter of the football club S.L. Benfica, and was a frequent spectator at their matches while mayor of Lisbon. He also accompanied Benfica to both UEFA Europa League finals, in 2013 and 2014.

In the 2026 G7 summit he confessed that he used to be a heavy smoker but had quit smoking in 2005.

== Electoral history ==
=== Loures City Council election, 1993 ===
Ballot: 12 December 1993
| Party | Candidate | Votes | % | Seats | +/− |
|---|---|---|---|---|---|
| CDU | Demétrio Alves | 55,524 | 34.6 | 4 | –1 |
| PS | António Costa | 53,749 | 33.5 | 4 | +1 |
| PSD | João Malato Correia | 34,727 | 21.7 | 3 | ±0 |
| CDS–PP | – | 6,348 | 4.0 | 0 | ±0 |
| PCTP/MRPP | – | 4,117 | 2.6 | 0 | ±0 |
| Blank/Invalid ballots | | 5,829 | 3.6 | – | – |
| Turnout | | 160,294 | 61.01 | 11 | ±0 |
Source: Autárquicas 1993

=== European Parliament election, 2004 ===
Ballot: 13 June 2004
| Party | Candidate | Votes | % | Seats | +/− |
|---|---|---|---|---|---|
| PS | António Costa (Note: Second in the list, became the top candidate after the sudden death of António de Sousa Franco, the original top candidate, during the campaign.) | 1,516,001 | 44.5 | 12 | ±0 |
| FP | João de Deus Pinheiro | 1,132,769 | 33.3 | 9 | –2 |
| CDU | Ilda Figueiredo | 309,401 | 9.1 | 2 | ±0 |
| BE | Miguel Portas | 167,313 | 4.9 | 1 | +1 |
| PCTP/MRPP | Garcia Pereira | 36,294 | 1.1 | 0 | ±0 |
| Other parties | | 108,338 | 3.2 | 0 | ±0 |
| Blank/Invalid ballots | | 134,166 | 4.0 | – | – |
| Turnout | | 3,404,782 | 38.60 | 24 | –1 |
Source: Comissão Nacional de Eleições

=== Lisbon City Council by-election, 2007 ===
Ballot: 15 July 2007
| Party | Candidate | Votes | % | Seats | +/− |
|---|---|---|---|---|---|
| PS | António Costa | 56,732 | 29.5 | 6 | +1 |
| Ind. | Carmona Rodrigues | 31,990 | 16.6 | 3 | new |
| PSD | Fernando Negrão | 30,401 | 15.8 | 3 | –5 |
| Ind. | Helena Roseta | 19,754 | 10.3 | 2 | new |
| CDU | Ruben de Carvalho | 18,163 | 9.4 | 2 | ±0 |
| BE | José Sá Fernandes | 13,132 | 6.8 | 1 | ±0 |
| CDS–PP | Telmo Correia | 7,148 | 3.7 | 0 | –1 |
| PCTP/MRPP | Garcia Pereira | 3,021 | 1.6 | 0 | ±0 |
| Other parties | | 4,530 | 2.3 | 0 | ±0 |
| Blank/Invalid ballots | | 7,483 | 3.9 | – | – |
| Turnout | | 192,354 | 36.70 | 17 | ±0 |
Source: Intercalares 2007

=== Lisbon City Council election, 2009 ===
Ballot: 11 October 2009
| Party | Candidate | Votes | % | Seats | +/− |
|---|---|---|---|---|---|
| PS | António Costa | 123,372 | 44.0 | 9 | +3 |
| PSD/CDS–PP/MPT/PPM | Pedro Santana Lopes | 108,457 | 38.7 | 7 | +4 |
| CDU | Ruben de Carvalho | 22,623 | 8.1 | 1 | –1 |
| BE | Luís Fazenda | 12,795 | 4.6 | 0 | –1 |
| Other parties | | 5,911 | 2.1 | 0 | ±0 |
| Blank/Invalid ballots | | 7,152 | 2.5 | – | – |
| Turnout | | 280,310 | 53.43 | 17 | ±0 |
Source: Autárquicas 2009

=== Lisbon City Council election, 2013 ===
Ballot: 29 September 2013
| Party | Candidate | Votes | % | Seats | +/− |
|---|---|---|---|---|---|
| PS | António Costa | 116,425 | 50.9 | 11 | +2 |
| PSD/CDS–PP/MPT | Fernando Seara | 51,156 | 22.4 | 4 | –3 |
| CDU | João Ferreira | 22,519 | 9.9 | 2 | +1 |
| BE | João Semedo | 10,533 | 4.6 | 0 | ±0 |
| PPM/PPV/PND | José Jorge Andrade | 2,814 | 1.2 | 0 | new |
| PCTP/MRPP | Joana Miranda | 2,378 | 1.0 | 0 | ±0 |
| Other parties | | 1,838 | 0.8 | 0 | ±0 |
| Blank/Invalid ballots | | 15,792 | 6.9 | – | – |
| Turnout | | 228,682 | 45.06 | 17 | ±0 |
Source: Autárquicas 2013

=== PS Primary election, 2014 ===
Ballot: 28 September 2014
| Candidate | Votes | % |
|---|---|---|
| António Costa | 120,188 | 67.8 |
| António José Seguro | 55,928 | 31.5 |
| Blank/Invalid ballots | 1,234 | 0.7 |
| Turnout | 177,350 | 70.71 |
Source: Resultados

=== Legislative election, 2015 ===
Ballot: 4 October 2015
| Party | Candidate | Votes | % | Seats | +/− |
|---|---|---|---|---|---|
| PàF | Pedro Passos Coelho | 2,085,465 | 38.6 | 107 | –25 |
| PS | António Costa | 1,747,730 | 32.3 | 86 | +12 |
| BE | Catarina Martins | 550,945 | 10.2 | 19 | +11 |
| CDU | Jerónimo de Sousa | 445,901 | 8.3 | 17 | +1 |
| PAN | André Silva | 75,170 | 1.4 | 1 | +1 |
| PDR | Marinho e Pinto | 61,920 | 1.1 | 0 | new |
| PCTP/MRPP | Garcia Pereira | 60,045 | 1.1 | 0 | ±0 |
| Other parties | | 178,937 | 3.3 | 0 | ±0 |
| Blank/Invalid ballots | | 201,979 | 3.7 | – | – |
| Turnout | | 5,408,092 | 55.84 | 230 | ±0 |
Source: Diário da República

=== Legislative election, 2019 ===
Ballot: 6 October 2019
| Party | Candidate | Votes | % | Seats | +/− |
|---|---|---|---|---|---|
| PS | António Costa | 1,903,687 | 36.3 | 108 | +22 |
| PSD | Rui Rio | 1,454,283 | 27.8 | 79 | –10 |
| BE | Catarina Martins | 498,549 | 9.5 | 19 | ±0 |
| CDU | Jerónimo de Sousa | 332,018 | 6.3 | 12 | –5 |
| CDS–PP | Assunção Cristas | 221,094 | 4.2 | 5 | –13 |
| PAN | André Silva | 173,931 | 3.3 | 4 | +3 |
| Chega | André Ventura | 67,502 | 1.3 | 1 | new |
| IL | Carlos Guimarães Pinto | 67,443 | 1.3 | 1 | new |
| LIVRE | Joacine Katar Moreira | 56,940 | 1.1 | 1 | +1 |
| Other parties | | 207,162 | 4.0 | 0 | ±0 |
| Blank/Invalid ballots | | 254,875 | 4.9 | – | – |
| Turnout | | 5,237,484 | 48.60 | 230 | ±0 |
Source: Comissão Nacional de Eleições

=== Legislative election, 2022 ===
Ballot: 30 January 2022
| Party | Candidate | Votes | % | Seats | +/− |
|---|---|---|---|---|---|
| PS | António Costa | 2,302,601 | 41.4 | 120 | +12 |
| PSD (Note: Sum of the votes of the Social Democratic Party (PSD) in mainland Portugal and the PSD.CDS – People's Party (CDS–PP) coalitions in Azores and Madeira. The 5 MPs elected in these coalitions are all from the PSD.) | Rui Rio | 1,618,381 | 29.1 | 77 | –2 |
| Chega | André Ventura | 399,659 | 7.2 | 12 | +11 |
| IL | João Cotrim Figueiredo | 273,687 | 4.9 | 8 | +7 |
| BE | Catarina Martins | 244,603 | 4.4 | 5 | –14 |
| CDU | Jerónimo de Sousa | 238,920 | 4.3 | 6 | –6 |
| CDS–PP | Rodrigues dos Santos | 89,181 | 1.6 | 0 | –5 |
| PAN | Inês Sousa Real | 88,152 | 1.6 | 1 | –3 |
| LIVRE | Rui Tavares | 71,232 | 1.3 | 1 | ±0 |
| Other parties | | 91,299 | 1.6 | 0 | ±0 |
| Blank/Invalid ballots | | 146,824 | 2.6 | – | – |
| Turnout | | 5,564,539 | 51.46 | 230 | ±0 |
Source: Comissão Nacional de Eleições

== Honours ==
=== National honours ===
- Grand Cross of the Military Order of Christ (25 November 2024)
- Grand Cross of the Order of Prince Henry (1 March 2006)

=== Foreign honours ===
- Brazil:
  - Grand Cross of the Order of Rio Branco (29 May 2023)
  - Commander of the Order of Rio Branco (19 May 2014)
- Chile: Grand Cross of the Order of Merit (31 August 2010)
- Estonia: Third Class of the Order of the Cross of Terra Mariana (16 July 2010)
- Greece: Grand Cross of the Order of Honour (21 April 2017)
- Holy See: Knight Grand Cross of the Order of St. Gregory the Great (3 September 2010)
- Japan: Grand Cordon of the Order of the Sacred Treasure (16 February 2015)
- Lithuania: Grand Cross of the Order for Merits to Lithuania (16 July 2010)
- Luxembourg: Grand Cross of the Order of Merit of the Grand Duchy of Luxembourg (28 June 2019)
- Norway: Grand Cross of the Royal Norwegian Order of Merit (25 September 2009)
- Poland:
  - Commander's Cross with Star of the Order of Merit of the Republic of Poland (16 February 2015)
  - Commander's Cross with Star of the Order of Polonia Restituta (18 July 2012)
- Sovereign Military Order of Malta: Grand Cross of the Order pro merito Melitensi (23 November 2010)
- Spain: Grand Cross of the Order of Charles III (25 November 2016)
- India: Pravasi Bharatiya Samman for Public Services (2017)

== See also ==
- List of heads of state and government of Indian origin

== Notes ==
Political offices
| Vacant Title last held by António Couto dos Santos | Minister of Parliamentary Affairs; 1997–1999 | Vacant Title next held by Luís Marques Mendes |
| Preceded by José Vera Jardim | Minister of Justice; 1999–2002 | Succeeded by Celeste Cardona |
| Preceded by Daniel Sanches | Minister of Internal Administration; 2005–2007 | Succeeded by Rui Pereira |
| Preceded by Carmona Rodrigues | Mayor of Lisbon; 2007–2015 | Succeeded by Fernando Medina |
| Preceded by António José Seguro | Leader of the Opposition; 2014–2015 | Succeeded by Pedro Passos Coelho |
| Preceded by Pedro Passos Coelho | Prime Minister of Portugal; 2015–2024 | Succeeded by Luís Montenegro |
| Preceded by Charles Michel | President of the European Council; 2024– | Incumbent |
Party political offices
| Preceded by Francisco Assis | President of the Parliamentary Group of the Socialist Party; 2002–2004 | Succeeded by António José Seguro |
| Preceded by António José Seguro | Secretary-General of the Socialist Party; 2014–2024 | Succeeded by Pedro Nuno Santos |
Academic offices
| Preceded by Jean-Claude Juncker | Invocation Speaker of the College of Europe; 2017 | Succeeded by Antonio Tajani |
