= Alfredo Cunha =

Portuguese photographer

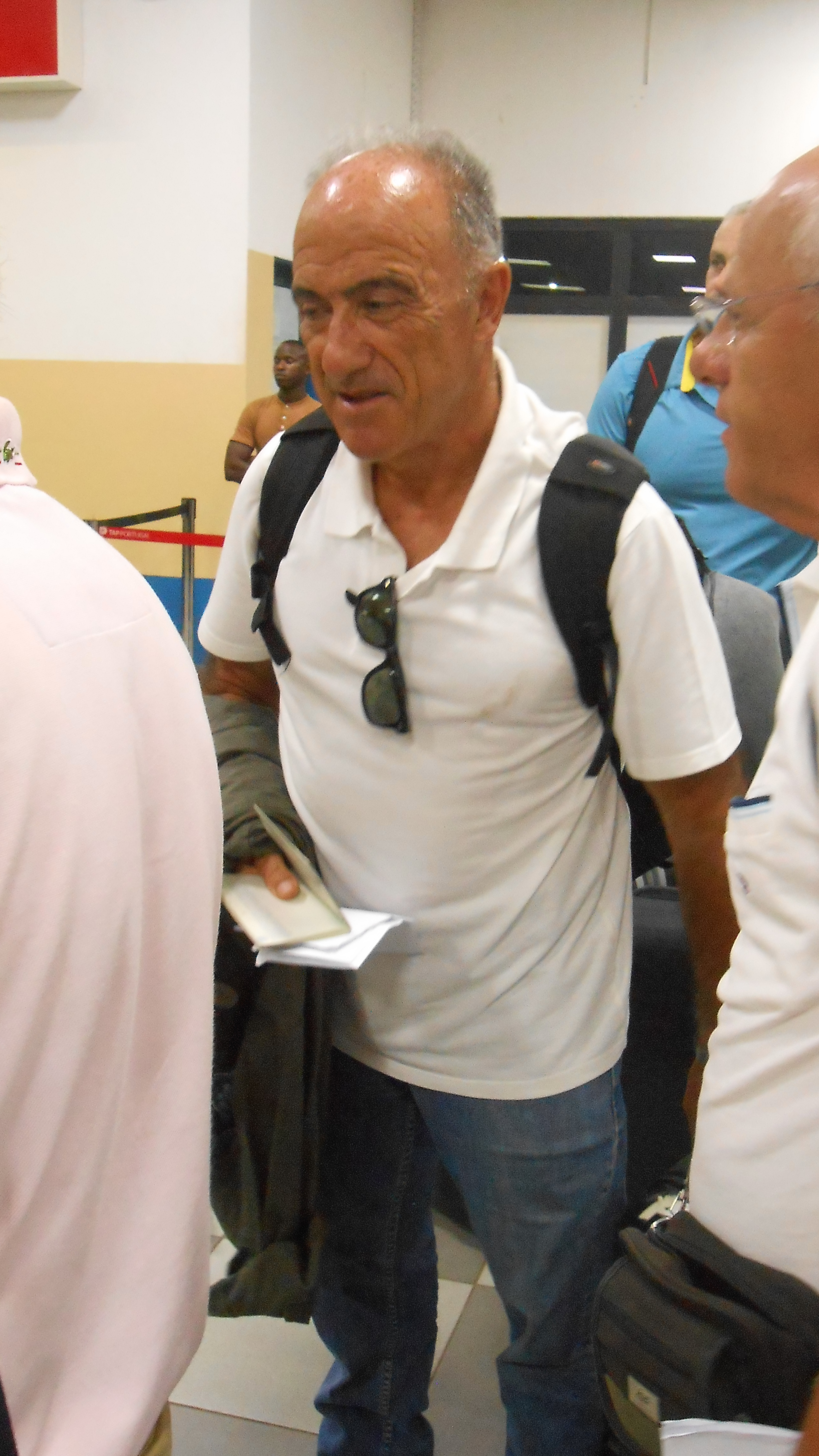
Alfredo Cunha (2017)

Alfredo de Almeida Coelho da Cunha (born in Celorico da Beira, 8 October 1953) is a Portuguese photographer. He is one of the most renowned Portuguese photojournalists.

== Career ==
Cunha started his professional career in 1970, initially related to publicity. He was first a collaborator of the newspaper Notícias da Amadora, in 1971, moving to the more prestiged weekly O Século and his magazine O Século Ilustrado, in 1972. He was one of the main photographers of the revolution of 25 April 1974, capturing some of the most memorable images of the historical event. He also documented the Decolonization, capturing the return of many Portuguese who came back from the African colonies, in 1975. He worked for three Portuguese news agencies, the ANOP, since 1977, the Notícias de Portugal (News of Portugal), since 1982, and LUSA, created as the merger of the two previous, in 1987.

He was the official photographer of President of the Republic, general António Ramalho Eanes, from 1976 to 1978, and of his successor, Mário Soares, from 1986 to 1996.

He worked as photography editor of the daily Público, from 1990 to 1997, and of the Edipresse Group, since 1997. He was, afterwards, editor of the daily Jornal de Notícias, of Porto, from 2003 to 2012, and photography director of the Global Imagens. After his official retirement, he became a freelancer in 2012. During bis carcere he documented historical events like the fall of the communist regime in Romania, in 1989, and the Iraq War, in 2003.

The largest exhibition of his work took place with the name Tempo Depois do Tempo. Fotografias de Alfredo Cunha: 1970-2017 (Time After Time. Photographs by Alfredo Cunha: 1970-2017) at the Municipal Gallery of the Cordoaria Nacional of Lisbon, on March–April 2017, presenting 480 black and white photographs from his entire career.

His works are archived at the Portuguese Photography Center of Porto and at the Municipal Photographic Archive of Lisbon, which own 500 printed photographs and more than 5000 digitised photographs, all in black and white. He always cultivated the black and white photography, instead of colour photography, as a personal preference.

== Bibliography ==
He is the author and illustrator of several books, including:

- Raízes da Nossa Força (1972)
- Vidas Alheias (1974)
- Disparos (1976)
- Sá Carneiro (1981), photobiography
- Grandes Museus de Portugal (1992)
- Naquele Tempo (1995)
- O Melhor Café (1996), with text by Pedro Rosa Mendes
- Porto de Mar (1997)
- A Norte (1998)
- O Dia 25 de Abril de 1974: 76 Fotografias e Um Retrato (1999), with text by Adelino Gomes
- A Cidade das Pontes (2001), with text by David Pontes
- Cuidado com as Crianças (2003)
- O Homem na Catedral (2003), by Eduardo Melo Peixoto
- A Cortina dos Dias (2012)
- Os Rapazes dos Tanques (2014), with text by Adelino Gomes
- Toda a Esperança do Mundo (2015)
- Felicidade (2016)
- Fátima - Enquanto Houver Portugueses (2017)
- Mário Soares (2017), photobiography
- Retratos, 1970-2018 (2018)
- 25 de Abril, 45 Anos (2019).

== See also ==
- Carnation Revolution
- Eduardo Gageiro
