= TVI =

TVI may refer to:

== Television channels and stations ==
- RTL-TVI, a French-language television station in Belgium
- TVi (channel), a Ukrainian TV-channel
- TVi, former name of TV Okey, a Malaysian television channel
- Tamil Vision International, a Tamil language television channel in Toronto, Canada
- Televisão Independente, a Portuguese television channel
- Television Iwate, a television station in Iwate Prefecture, Japan
- Television of Iran (TVI), a former name of IRIB TV1

== Other uses ==
- TeleVideo, a manufacturer of computer terminals
- TVI Community College (now Central New Mexico Community College) in Albuquerque, New Mexico
- Television interference
- Tactical vehicle intervention, a pursuit tactic by which a pursuing car can force a fleeing car to turn sideways abruptly, causing the driver to lose control and stop
