= Portuguese Africa =

Portuguese Africa may refer to:

- African territories of the Portuguese Empire:
  - Portuguese Cape Verde
  - Portuguese Congo
  - Portuguese East Africa
  - Portuguese Guinea
  - Portuguese São Tomé and Príncipe
  - Portuguese West Africa
  - Fort of São João Baptista de Ajudá
- Portuguese in Africa
- Portuguese-speaking African countries (Lusophone Africa)

== See also ==
- Portuguese exploration of Africa
- Scramble for Africa
- Pink Map
- Portuguese Colonial War
