= Public Prosecution Service (Portugal) =

- Ministério Público (Portuguese)
- Logo of the Public Prosecution Service

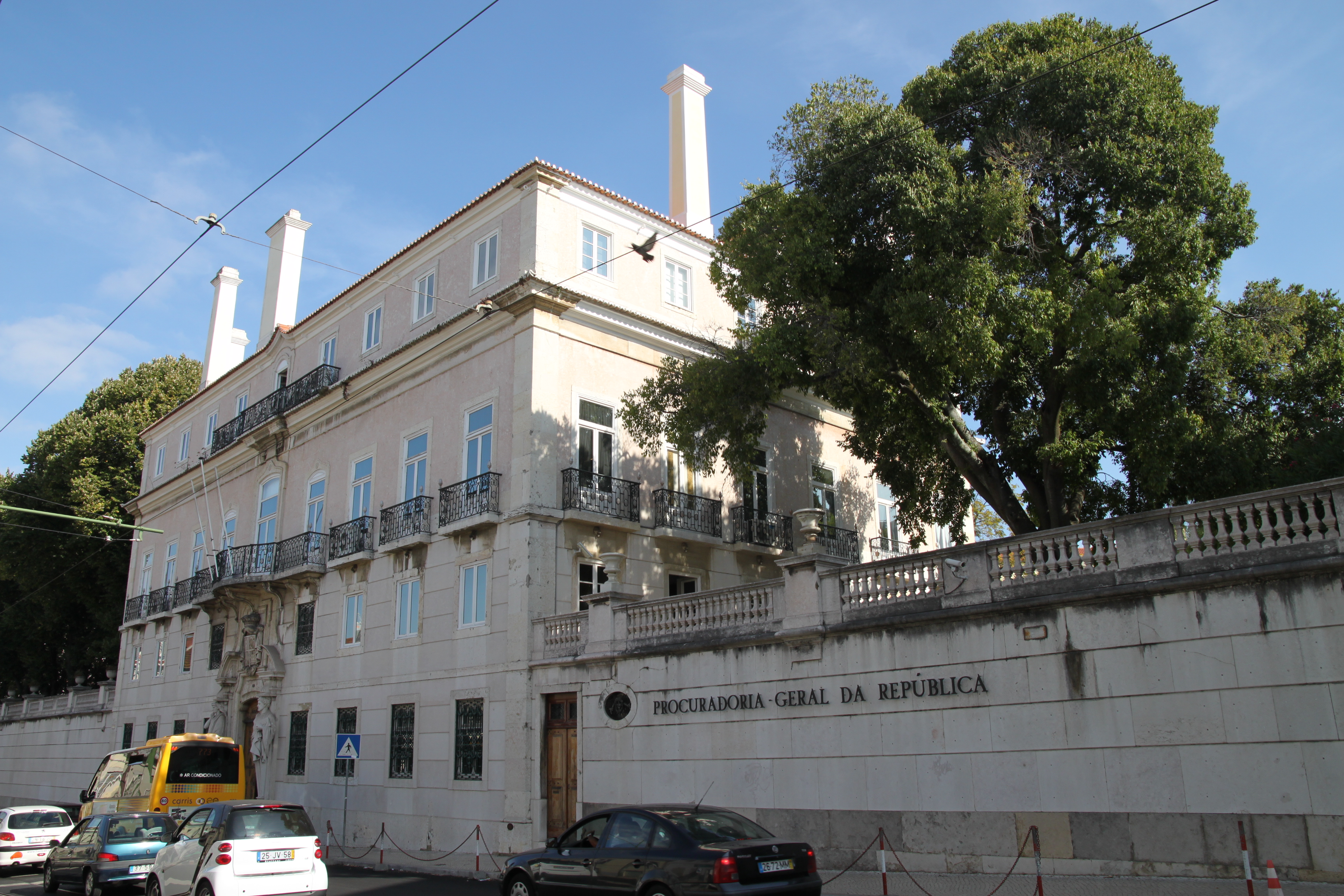
- Headquarters of the Public Prosecution Service in Lisbon

Ministry overview
- Formed: 16 May 1832; 194 years ago
- Type: Parquet
- Jurisdiction: Portugal
- Headquarters: Palace of the Dukes of Palmela, Lisbon, Portugal; 38°43′09″N 9°09′13″W
- Motto: In defense of democratic legality (Note: Portuguese: Em defesa da legalidade democrática)
- Ministry executive: Amadeu Guerra, Prosecutor General
- Child agencies: Prosecutor General's Office; High Council of the Public Prosecution Service; Central Department of Criminal Investigation and Prosecution
- Website: Public Prosecution Service of Portugal

The Public Prosecution Service (Note: Portuguese: Ministério Público; lit. 'Public Ministry') (MP), is the body of the judiciary of Portugal responsible for the public prosecution and the representation of the state before the courts. It is an hierarchic organized body, composed of magistrates and headed by the Procurador-Geral da República (attorney-general of the Republic).

Although having the word "ministry" in its name, the MP is not a ministry in the sense of government department.

== Roles ==
Among others, the Portuguese constitution and the common law give the following roles to the Public Prosecution Service:

- to conduct the public prosecution;
- to direct the criminal investigation;
- to participate in the execution of the criminal policy;
- to represent the State;
- to defend the democratic legality;
- to defend the rights and the interests of the child and young people;
- to exercise ex officio the patronage of the workers and their families in the defense of their social rights;
- to defend the collective and diffuse interests;
- to defend the independence of the courts;
- to ensure that the judicial function is exercised in accordance with the Constitution and the laws.

== Organization ==
The superior body of the Public Prosecution Service is the Procuradoria-Geral da República (attorney-general's office), presided by the Procurador-Geral da República (PGR).

The PGR is the only magistrate of the Public Prosecution Service that is politically designated, being proposed by the government and appointed by the president of Portugal for six years in office. The PGR is also the only magistrate of the Public Prosecution Service that can be chosen from among persons that previously were not magistrates, the person chosen not even being mandatory linked to any area of recruitment or having a specific training. However, in practice, most of the persons appointed for the office of PGR came from the career magistracy.

Under the Procuradoria-Geral da Reública there are also four procuradorias-gerais distritais (district attorneys-general's offices) and 23 procuradorias da República (attorney's offices). The first ones represent the Public Prosecution Service in the courts of second instance and the last ones in the courts of first instance.

For the role of directing the criminal investigation, each of the Public Prosecution Service offices includes a department of investigation and prosecution, composed of attorneys specially dedicated to the investigation of the most serious crimes. For the criminal investigation, the Public Prosecution Service also controls the activity of the Judiciary Police.

== Public Prosecution Service magistrates ==
The attorneys of the Public Prosecution Service are magistrates as the judges, but constitute a parallel and independent body from the Portuguese Judicial Magistracy.

The career of the magistrates of the Public Prosecution Service includes the following categories: procurador-geral-adjunto (deputy attorney-general), procurador da República (attorney) and procurador-adjunto (deputy attorney).

The Procurador-Geral da República (attorney-general) has also the status of the magistrate while in office, but it is not mandatory that he or she had been a Public Prosecution Service magistrate before being appointed for the role. Regarding the Vice-Procurador-Geral da República (vice-attorney-general), he or she is a magistrate with mandatory origin in the Public Prosecution Service career magistracy.

The Public Prosecution Service is represented by the Procurador-Geral da República and by procuradores-gerais-adjuntos before the Supreme Court of Justice, the Constitutional Court, the Supreme Administrative Court and the Accountants Court. It is represented by procuradores-gerais-adjuntos before the relações and the central administrative courts. Before the first instance courts, it is represented by procuradores-gerais-adjuntos, procuradores da República and procuradores-adjuntos.

The access to the career of Public Prosecution Service magistrate obeys to the same previous conditions as the access to the careers of judges, also implying the graduation in the Centro de Estudos Judiciários (Center of Judiciary Studies).
