= 2014 Portuguese Socialist Party prime ministerial primary =

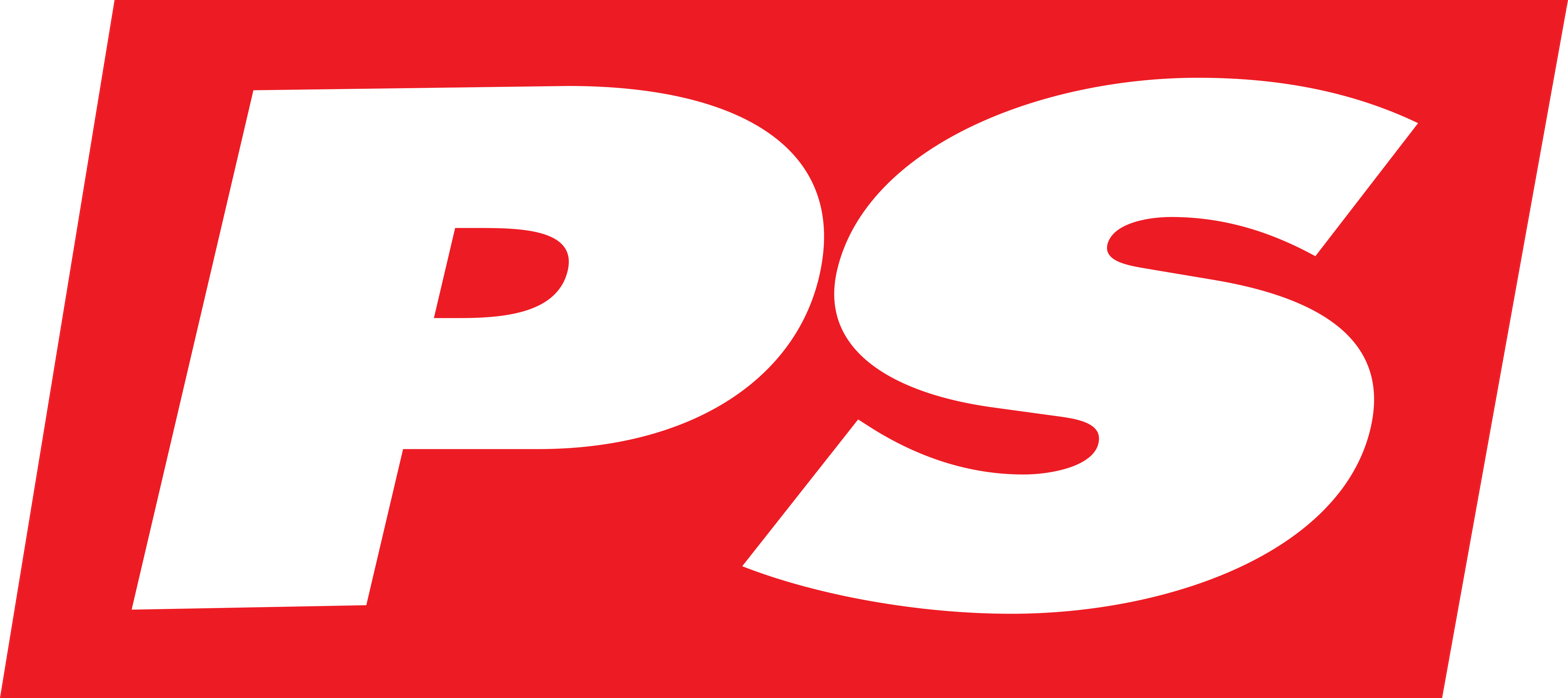
- 28 September 2014
- Turnout: 70.7%
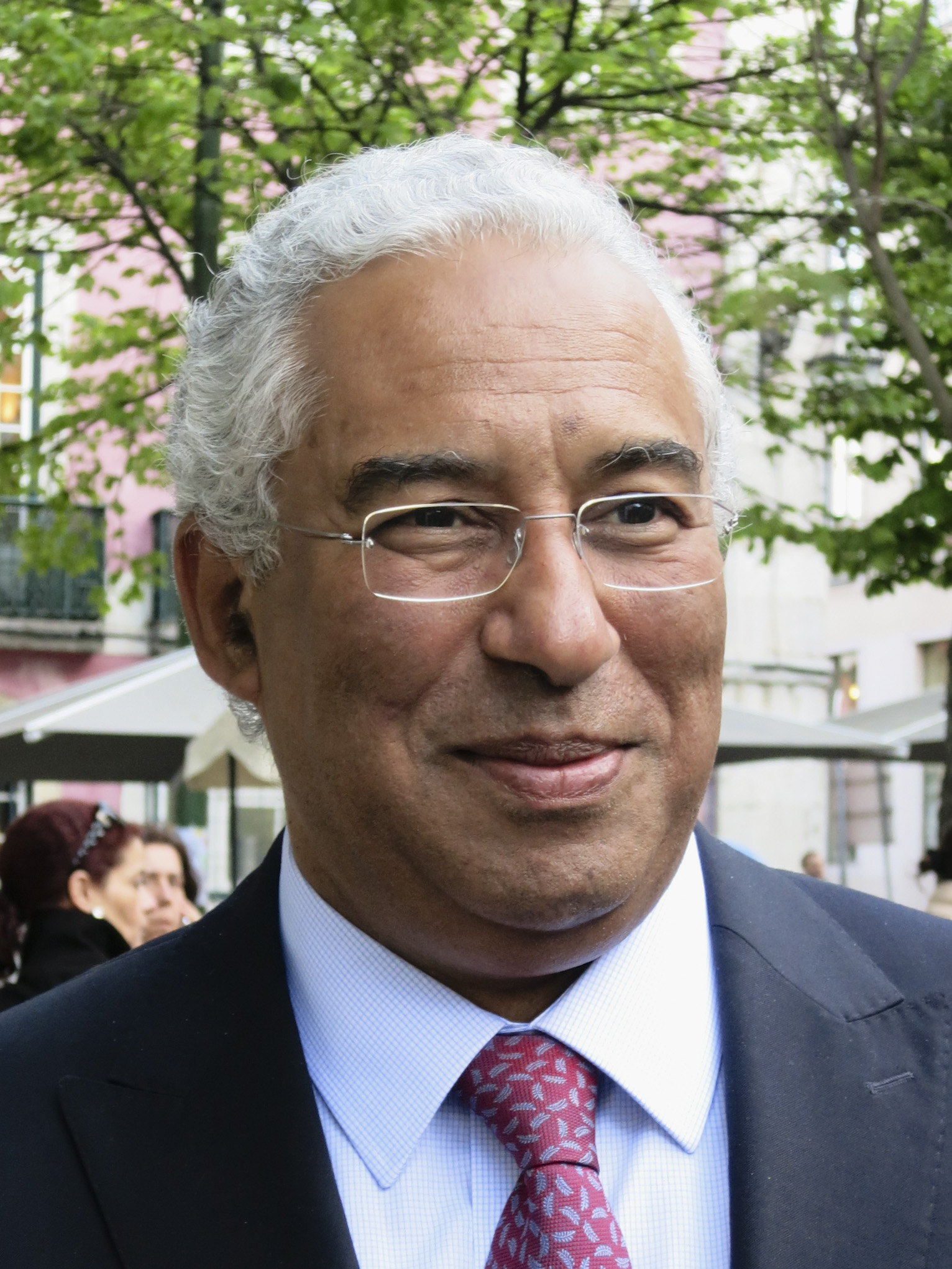

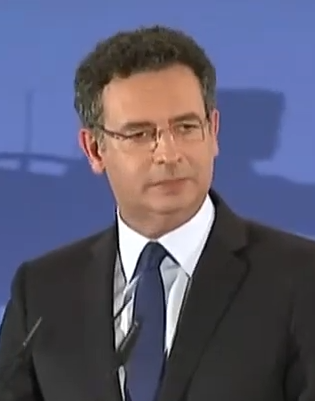
Nominee	António Costa	António José Seguro
Popular vote	120,188	55,928
Percentage	67.8%	31.5%
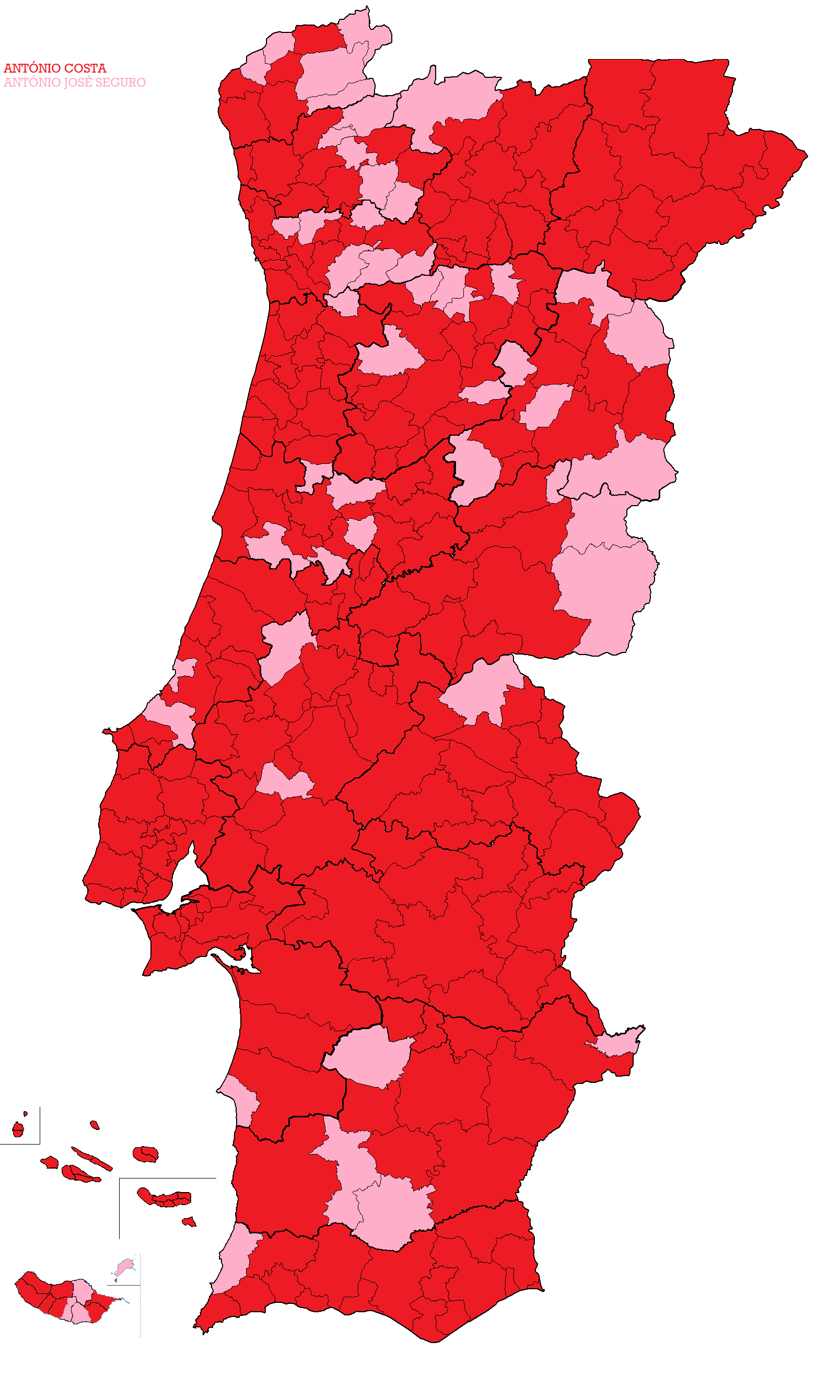
- Winner by municipality Red: Costa; Pink: Seguro

The 2014 Socialist Party prime ministerial primary elections was held on 28 September 2014, the first primary open for non-members of the Socialist Party (PS). It elected the party's candidate for Prime Minister of Portugal in the 2015 legislative election. It was the first time in Portugal that a party had an open primary. There were only two candidates running: António José Seguro, the incumbent secretary-general of the party, and António Costa, the mayor of Lisbon. António Costa won the primary by a landslide, achieving about 68% of the votes against the 32% of António José Seguro.

After the first results were announced, Seguro conceded defeat and resigned as Secretary-General of the Party.

== Background ==
Following the narrow victory of the Socialist Party over the coalition between the PSD and the CDS-PP in the European elections on 25 May 2014, many Socialist Party members and supporters considered the result a disappointment and many blamed Seguro for not being a real alternative to the Prime Minister Pedro Passos Coelho (PSD). On 27 May, António Costa announced that he would seek the leadership of the Socialist Party.

António José Seguro refused to initiate a leadership contest and accused António Costa of being an opportunist who had broken the deal the two made in early 2013, when António Costa was considering challenging Seguro.

After a bitter meeting of the party leadership members, António Costa included, it was agreed to call a primary election open to supporters of the Socialist Party that would elect the party's candidate for Prime Minister for the following legislative elections in October 2015.

== Voting procedures ==
=== Calendar ===
Nominations for the candidacy were opened on 15 July 2014 and closed on 14 August 2014. To be able to vote, voters had to register between 15 July 2014 and 12 September 2014.

=== Conditions ===
Unlike previous Socialist Party leadership elections, this was the first primary to be open to the general public. In order to participate to the open primary, voters had to meet the following conditions:

- Registered in the Portuguese electoral lists;
- Sign a declaration of political principles committing to the values of the Party: "freedom, equality and solidarity, and with the compromise of fighting for human rights, justice and peace."

Members of the party were automatically eligible to participate.

== Candidates ==
Name	Born	Experience
António José Seguro	11 March 1962 (age 52); Penamacor	Leader of the Opposition (2011–2014); Secretary-general of the Socialist Party (2011–2014); Member of Parliament for Braga (2005–2014); Parliamentary leader of the Socialist Party (2004–2005); Minister in the Cabinet of the Prime Minister (2001–2002); Member of the European Parliament (1999–2001); Secretary of State Assistant to the Prime Minister (1997–1999); Secretary of State for Youth (1995–1997); Member of Parliament for Guarda (1995–1999); Secretary-general of the Socialist Youth (1990–1994); Member of Parliament for Porto (1991–1995); Member of Parliament for Lisbon (1985–1987; 2002–2005)
António Costa	17 July 1961 (age 53); Lisbon	Mayor of Lisbon (2007–2015); Minister of Internal Administration (2005–2007); Vice President of the European Parliament (2004–2005); Member of the European Parliament (2004–2005); Parliamentary leader of the Socialist Party (2002–2004); Member of Parliament for Leiria (2002–2004); Minister of Justice (1999–2002); Minister of Parliamentary Affairs (1997–1999); Secretary of State for Parliamentary Affairs (1995–1997); Member of Parliament for Lisbon (1991–2002; 2005–2007)

== Notable endorsements ==
António José Seguro

Ministers

- Alberto Martins – former Minister of Justice (2009–2011), former Minister of Public Administration (1999–2002) and incumbent Member of the Assembly of the Republic (1987–2017)
- Maria de Belém Roseira – incumbent President of the Socialist Party (2011–2014), former Minister of Health (1995–1999), former Minister of Equality (1999–2000) and incumbent Member of the Assembly of the Republic (1999–2015)

Members of Parliament

- António Galamba – former Member of the Assembly of the Republic (1995–2011)
- António Gameiro – incumbent Member of the Assembly of the Republic (2005–2022) and Chair of the Santarém Federation of the Socialist Party
- Carlos Cordeiro – former Member of the Assembly of the Republic (1976–1979; 1983–1985; 1995–1999)
- Fernando Moniz – former Member of the Assembly of the Republic (1987–1991; 1999–2011)
- Jamila Madeira – former Member of the Assembly of the Republic (1995–1999; 2009–2011) and former Secretary-general of the Socialist Youth (2000–2004)
- João Paulo Pedrosa – incumbent Member of the Assembly of the Republic (2009–2022)
- José Albano Marques – former Member of the Assembly of the Republic (2009-2011) and chair of the Guarda Federation of the Socialist Party
- José Bravo Nico – incumbent Member of the Assembly of the Republic (2005–2015)
- José Luís Carneiro – incumbent Member of the Assembly of the Republic (since 2005) and Chair of the Porto Federation of the Socialist Party
- José Mota Andrade – incumbent Member of the Assembly of the Republic (1995-2015) and Chair of the Bragança Federation of the Socialist Party
- ~~Manuel Alegre – former Member of the Assembly of the Republic (1975–2009), candidate for President in 2006 and 2011 and candidate for the party's leadership in 2004~~ (changed his support to António Costa)
- Miguel Laranjeiro – incumbent Member of the Assembly of the Republic (2005–2015)
- Nuno Sá – incumbent Member of the Assembly of the Republic (2005–2022)
- Pedro Coimbra – former Member of the Assembly of the Republic (2002–2005) and Chair of the Coimbra Federation of the Socialist Party
- Rui Prudêncio – former Member of the Assembly of the Republic (2009–2011)

Members of the European Parliament

- Ana Gomes – incumbent Member of the European Parliament (2004–2019)
- Carlos Zorrinho – incumbent Member of the European Parliament (2014–2024)
- Francisco Assis – incumbent Member of the European Parliament (2014–2019; 2004–2009) and candidate for the party's leadership in July 2011

Mayors

- António Borges – mayor of Resende (2002-2013) and chair of the Viseu Federation of the Socialist Party
- João Soares – former Mayor of Lisbon (1995–2001) and candidate for the party's leadership in 2004
- José Manuel Carpinteira – former Mayor of Vila Nova de Cerveira (1989–2013) and Chair of the Viana do Castelo Federation of the Socialist Party
- Manuel Machado – incumbent Mayor of Coimbra (2013–2021; 1989–2001)
- Pedro do Carmo – incumbent Mayor of Ourique (2005–2015) and Chair of the Baixo Alentejo Federation of the Socialist Party
- ~~Rui Santos – incumbent Mayor of Vila Real (2013–2025)~~ (changed his support to António Costa)

Individuals

- Álvaro Beleza – physician and candidate for the party's leadership in 1992
- António Lacerda Sales – physician and candidate for Chair of the Leiria Federation of the Socialist Party
- Carlos Silva – Secretary-general of the General Union of Workers (UGT)
- Francisco Rocha – Chair of the Vila Real Federation of the Socialist Party
- Eurico Brilhante Dias – University professor and member of the National Secretariat of the Socialist Party.
- Victor Freitas – Chair of the Madeira Federation of the Socialist Party
António Costa

Presidents of the Republic

- Jorge Sampaio – former President of the Republic (1996–2006) and former Secretary-general of the Socialist Party (1989–1992)
- Mário Soares – former President of the Republic (1986–1996), former Prime Minister of Portugal (1976–1978, 1983–1985), former Secretary–general of the Socialist Party (1973–1985) and founding member of the Socialist Party

Prime Ministers

- José Sócrates – former Prime Minister (2005–2011) and former Secretary–general of the Socialist Party (2004–2011)

Presidents of the Assembly of the Republic

- António de Almeida Santos – former President of the Assembly of the Republic (1995–2002) and former President of the Socialist Party (1992–2011)

Ministers

- António Campos – former Minister of Health (2001–2002; 2005–2008)
- António Vitorino – former Minister of the Presidency and of Defence (1995–1997)
- Augusto Santos Silva – former Minister of Defence (2009–2011), former Minister of Parliamentary Affairs (2005–2009), former Minister of Culture (2001–2002), former Minister of Education (2000–2001) and incumbent Member of the Assembly of the Republic (2002–2024)
- Eduardo Ferro Rodrigues – former Secretary-general of the Socialist Party (2002–2004), former Minister of Labour (1995–2001), former Minister of Social Infrastructure (2001–2002) and incumbent Member of the Assembly of the Republic (1985–2022)
- João Cravinho – former Minister of Territorial Administration (1995–1999)
- José António Vieira da Silva – former Minister of Economy, Innovation and Development (2009–2011), former Minister of Labour (2005–2009) and incumbent Member of the Assembly of the Republic (2011–2015)
- José Lello – former Minister of Youth and Sports (2000–2002) and incumbent Member of the Assembly of the Republic (1983–2015)
- José Vera Jardim – former Minister of Justice (1995–1999)
- Jorge Lacão – former Minister of Parliamentary Affairs (2009–2011) and incumbent Member of the Assembly of the Republic (1983–2019)
- Luís Capoulas Santos – former Minister of Agriculture, Rural Development and Fisheries (1998–2002), and Chair of the Évora Federation of the Socialist Party

Members of Parliament

- Alberto Arons de Carvalho – former Member of the Assembly of the Republic (1975–1983; 1987–2009), former Secretary of State for Social Communication (1995–2002), former Secretary-general of the Socialist Youth (1975–1978) and founding member of the Socialist Party
- Alfredo Barroso – former Member of the Assembly of the Republic (1980–1987), former Secretary of State for the Presidency of the Council of Ministers (1983–1985) and founding member of the Socialist Party
- Ana Catarina Mendes – incumbent Member of the Assembly of the Republic (1995–2024) and Chair of the Setúbal Federation of the Socialist Party
- Ana Paula Vitorino – incumbent Member of the Assembly of the Republic (2009–2015) and former Secretary of State for Transportation (2005–2009)
- Duarte Cordeiro – former Member of the Assembly of the Republic (2009–2013), former Secretary of State for Youth and Sports (2005–2006) and former Secretary-general of the Socialist Youth (2008–2010)
- Eduardo Cabrita – incumbent Member of the Assembly of the Republic (2002–2022)
- Hortense Martins – incumbent Member of the Assembly of the Republic (2005–2022) and Chair of the Castelo Branco Federation of the Socialist Party
- Isabel Moreira – incumbent Member of the Assembly of the Republic (since 2011)
- João Galamba – incumbent Member of the Assembly of the Republic (2009–2024)
- José Miguel Medeiros – former Member of the Assembly of the Republic (1999–2011) and Chair of the Leiria Federation of the Socialist Party
- José Leitão – former Member of the Assembly of the Republic (1976–1980; 1983–1985; 1991–2005), former Secretary-general of the Socialist Youth (1978–1981) and founding member of the Socialist Party
- Manuel Alegre – former Member of the Assembly of the Republic (1975–2009), candidate for President in 2006 and 2011 and candidate for the party's leadership in 2004 (previously endorsed António José Seguro)
- Manuel Pizarro – incumbent Member of the Assembly of the Republic (2005–2019) and former Secretary of State for Health (2008–2011)
- Marcos Perestrello – incumbent Member of the Assembly of the Republic (2005–2009; 2011–2015), former Secretary of State for Defence and Sea Affairs (2009–2011) and Chair of the Lisbon Federation of the Socialist Party
- Pedro Delgado Alves – incumbent Member of the Assembly of the Republic (since 2011) and former Secretary-general of the Socialist Youth (2010–2012)
- Pedro Marques – former Member of the Assembly of the Republic (2009–2014) and former Secretary of State for Social Security (2005–2011)
- Pedro Nuno Santos – incumbent Member of the Assembly of the Republic (since 2005), former Secretary-general of the Socialist Youth (2004–2008) and Chair of the Aveiro Federation of the Socialist Party
- Sérgio Sousa Pinto – incumbent Member of the Assembly of the Republic (2009–2025; 1995–1999) and former Secretary-general of the Socialist Youth (1994–2000)
- Sónia Fertuzinhos – incumbent Member of the Assembly of the Republic (1995–2022)
- Vítor Ramalho – former Member of the Assembly of the Republic (1999–2009)

Members of the European Parliament

- Edite Estrela – former Member of the European Parliament (2004–2014) and former Mayor of Sintra (1993–2001)

Mayors

- Alberto Mesquita – incumbent Mayor of Vila Franca de Xira (2013–2021)
- André Rijo – incumbent Mayor of Arruda dos Vinhos (2013–2024)
- Berta Nunes – incumbent Mayor of Alfândega da Fé (2009–2019)
- Carla Tavares – incumbent Mayor of Amadora (2013–2024)
- Carlos Miguel – incumbent Mayor of Torres Vedras (2004–2015) and Chair of the Oeste Federation of the Socialist Party
- Domingos Bragança – incumbent Mayor of Guimarães (since 2013)
- Fernanda Asseiceira – incumbent Mayor of Alcanena (2009–2021)
- Filipe Sousa – incumbent Mayor of Santa Cruz (since 2013) (Independent)
- Guilherme Pinto – incumbent Mayor of Matosinhos (2005–2017) (Independent)
- Isilda Gomes – incumbent Mayor of Portimão (2013–2024)
- João Azevedo – incumbent Mayor of Mangualde (2009–2019)
- Joaquim Barreto – former Mayor of Cabeceiras de Basto (1993–2013) and Chair of the Braga Federation of the Socialist Party
- Luís Correia – incumbent Mayor of Castelo Branco (2013–2020)
- Luís Dias – incumbent Mayor of Vendas Novas (2013–2024)
- Maria da Luz Rosinha – former Mayor of Vila Franca de Xira (1998–2013)
- Maria do Céu Albuquerque – incumbent Mayor of Abrantes (2009–2019)
- Nuno Canta – incumbent Mayor of Montijo (2013–2024)
- Ricardo Pinheiro – incumbent Mayor of Campo Maior (2009–2015)
- Rui Santos – incumbent Mayor of Vila Real (2013–2025) (previously endorsed António José Seguro)
- Susana Amador – incumbent Mayor of Odivelas (2005–2015)

Individuals

- António Eusébio – Chair of the Algarve Federation of the Socialist Party
- António-Pedro Vasconcelos – film director (Independent)
- António Victorino de Almeida – composer (Independent)
- Luís Testa – Chair of the Portalegre Federation of the Socialist Party
- Ruben Alves – actor and film director (Independent)

== Opinion polling ==
Date(s) administered	Poll source	Sample size			Others/ Undecided	Lead
Date(s) administered	Poll source	Sample size	Seguro	Costa	Others/ Undecided	Lead
29 Sep 2014	Election result	177,350	31.5	67.8	0.7	36.3
24–25 Sep 2014	Eurosondagem	1,001	33.0	50.4	16.6	17.4
4–9 Sep 2014	Eurosondagem	1,011	32.9	55.1	12.0	22.2
31 Aug–3 Sep 2014	Aximage	602	26.4	60.9	12.7	34.5
31 Jul–6 Aug 2014	Eurosondagem	1,033	30.0	59.2	10.8	29.2
3–9 Jul 2014	Eurosondagem	1,014	24.9	68.3	6.8	43.4
4–7 Jul 2014	Aximage	593	26.4	64.1	9.5	37.7
2–5 Jun 2014	Eurosondagem	1,025	36.0	56.2	7.8	20.2
1–4 Jun 2014	Aximage	608	19.6	62.8	17.6	43.2
30 May–1 Jun 2014	Pitagórica	506	18.2	60.5	21.3	42.3

Hypothetical polling

Polling firm	Fieldwork date	Sample size	António José Seguro	António Costa	Francisco Assis	José Sócrates	Others/ Undecided	Lead
Pitagórica	25–29 Mar 2014	506	13.6	58.9	6.5	5.4	15.6	45.3
Pitagórica	24 Feb–1 Mar 2014	506	15.3	55.6	8.0	5.7	15.4	40.3
Pitagórica	20–24 Jan 2014	506	17.0	59.8	6.1	3.6	13.6	42.8
Pitagórica	10–15 Dec 2013	503	14.0	63.8	6.1	6.0	10.2	49.8
Pitagórica	14–19 Oct 2013	506	13.3	56.3	9.4	4.0	17.0	43.0
Pitagórica	24–28 Jul 2013	503	14.2	55.2	8.2	5.9	16.5	41.0
Pitagórica	28 Jun–2 Jul 2013	503	16.6	49.2	9.7	6.5	18.0	32.6
Pitagórica	23–28 May 2013	503	14.3	45.6	9.2	10.4	20.2	31.3
Pitagórica	17–20 Apr 2013	503	20.8	48.5	6.1	8.2	16.4	27.7

== Results ==
Candidate	28 September 2014	
Candidate	Votes	%
António Costa	120,188	67.77
António José Seguro	55,928	31.54
Total	176,116	
Valid votes	176,116	99.30
Invalid and blank ballots	1,234	0.70
Votes cast / turnout	177,350	70.71
Registered voters	250,811	
Source: Primárias 2014 Resultados

Vote share
António Costa	67.77%
António José Seguro	31.54%
Blank/Invalid	0.70%
