= 2004 Portuguese Socialist Party leadership election =

2004 Socialist Party leadership election
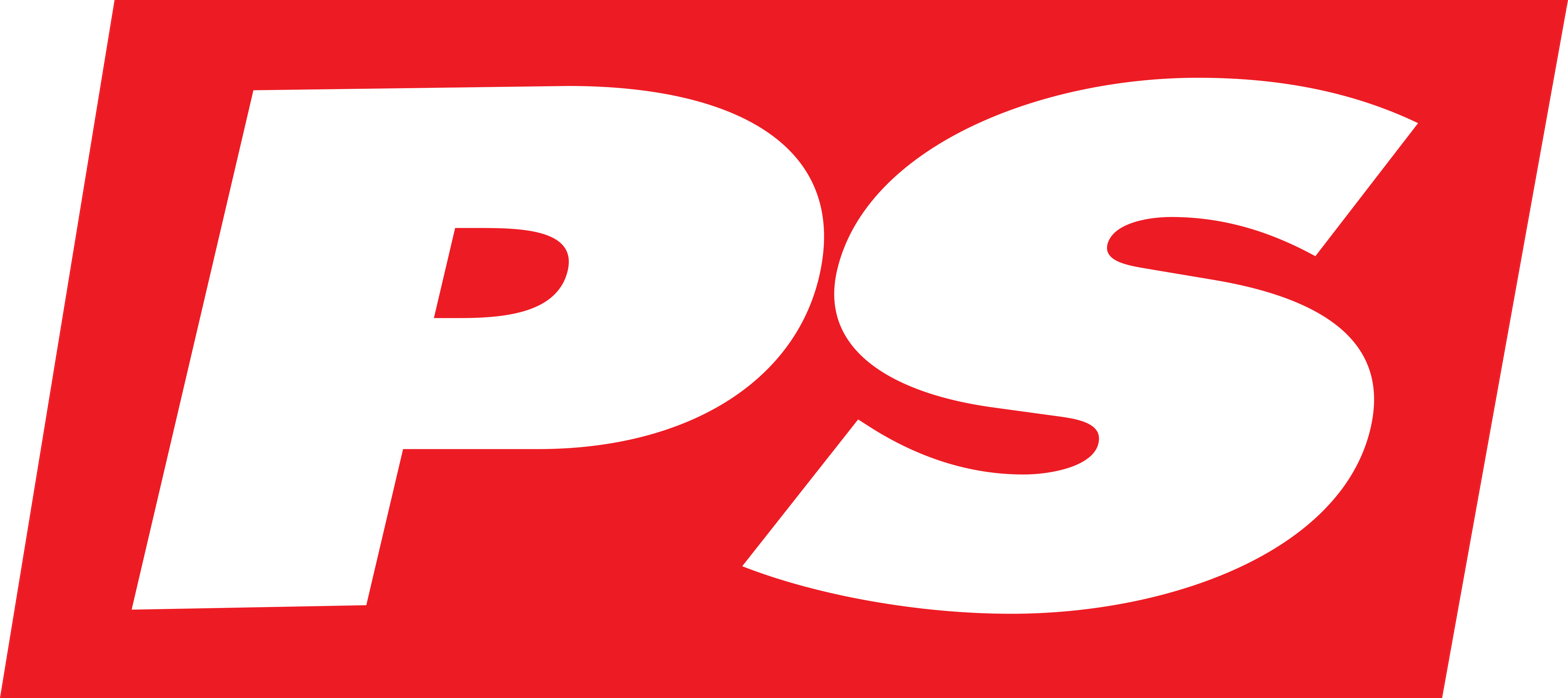
- 25–26 September 2004
- Turnout: 48.2%
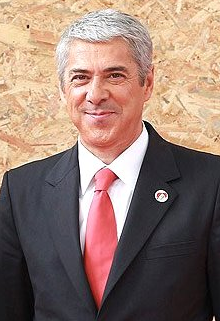

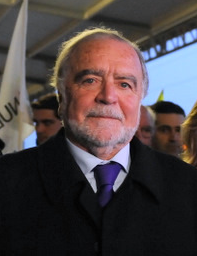

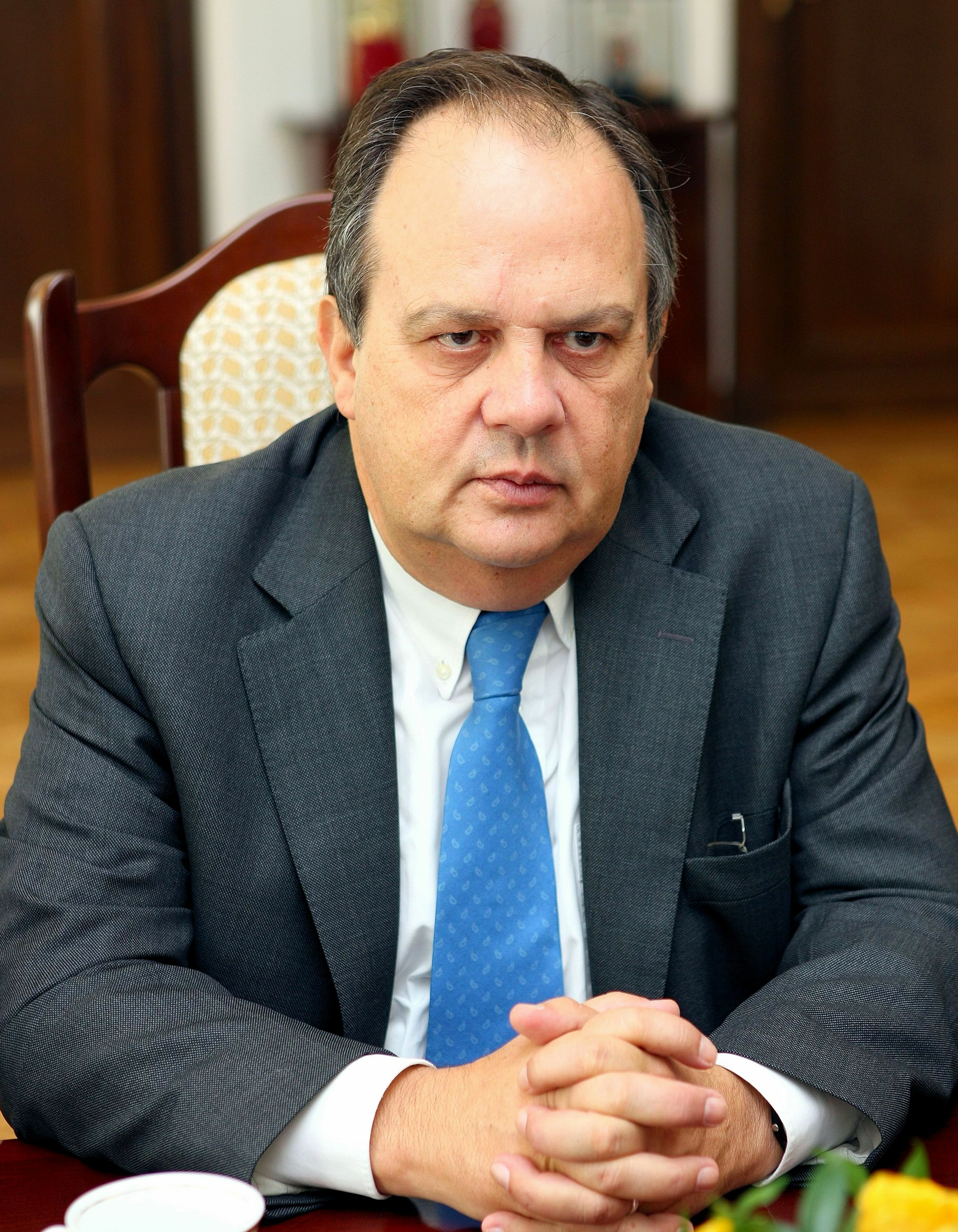
Candidate	José Sócrates	Manuel Alegre	João Soares
Popular vote	28,984	5,693	1,505
Percentage	79.5%	15.6%	4.1%
Secretary-General before election
Eduardo Ferro Rodrigues
Elected Secretary-General
José Sócrates

The 2004 Portuguese Socialist Party leadership election was held on 25 and 26 September 2004. The leadership ballot was called after Socialist Party Secretary-General Eduardo Ferro Rodrigues resigned as leader of the PS, against the decision of President Jorge Sampaio to appoint Pedro Santana Lopes as prime minister, replacing José Durão Barroso.

The declared candidates included the former Minister of the Environment José Sócrates, historic Socialist deputy Manuel Alegre and former Mayor of Lisbon and son of former president Mário Soares, João Soares. Sócrates won the election, becoming the 6th Secretary-general of the Socialist Party.

== Background ==
After the 2001 local elections, António Guterres resigned as Prime Minister and as PS leader, with the party starting the process to elect a new leader. The popular Guterres minister, Eduardo Ferro Rodrigues, who was a former MES leader and a former Jorge Sampaio supporter, was elected with almost unanimous support.

With Ferro Rodrigues as leader, the Socialists lost the 2002 legislative election to Durão Barroso by just 2.4% of the vote, electing 96 MPs. With a majority of right-wing MPs in the legislature, a Government was former between the Social Democrats (PSD) and the People's Party (CDS–PP), the first one to include the PP since the 80's, with the socialists returning to the opposition after 7 years in power.

Ferro Rodrigues leadership was not devoid of scandals with the most proeminent one being the Casa Pia scandal, with the arrest of a high-profile figure of the leadership of the party, the former Minister of Labour Paulo Pedroso.

=== Casa Pia scandal ===
The Casa Pia scandal was a case of child sexual abuses involving a number of children and employees at Casa Pia, a Portuguese state-run institution for the education and support of poor children and under-age orphans.

The scandal of alleged sexual abuse at the state-run Casa Pia orphanages resurfaced when several former orphanage children came forward with accusations of abuse. The accusations linked some politicians, diplomats, and media celebrities—all of whom were alleged to have conspired in a paedophilia ring that had operated for decades. The scandal broke in September 2002 when the mother of one alleged victim, known as Joel, complained of abuse by staff at a Casa Pia house. Paulo Pedroso, who was responsible for the Casa Pia homes, was suspected of 15 cases of sexual violence against minors, which allegedly took place between 1999 and 2000. Although he was arrested in the Assembly of the Republic, his case was later dropped.

Eduardo Ferro Rodrigues, who was a close personal friend of Paulo Pedroso, offered to undergo police questioning after "he had learned of plans to implicate him in the [Casa Pia] scandal". The weekly paper Expresso published a report on 25 May 2003, from four children who said they saw Ferro Rodrigues at locations where sexual abuse was taking place. The paper said there was no evidence he was personally involved and the Attorney General José Souto de Moura insisted he was not a suspect. Ferro Rodrigues took legal action against those who said they saw him at locations where sexual abuse was taking place.

=== Decline of the government's popularity and the European Elections ===
With the scandal settled, the release of Pedroso, and with the popularity of the opposition returning to form, the Socialists achieving their best result in a European election ever. The party won 44.5 percent of the votes, an increase of 1.5 percentage points, and held on to the 12 seats won in 1999, with these elections being seen as a referendum to the Government's popularity.

The Barroso government was marked by the fragile fiscal and economic situation of the country and by the War in Iraq, in which the Prime Minister was at odds with the President of the Republic Jorge Sampaio over the participation in the war. While Durão Barroso supported the invasion, even hosting a summit at Lajes Field, in the Azores, between the United States, the United Kingdom and Spain, which divided the public opinion, the President was against it.

A few days after the European election, José Manuel Durão Barroso announced he was resigning from the post of Prime Minister in order to become President of the European Commission. Despite pleas for a snap legislative election from Opposition parties, President Jorge Sampaio decided to nominate the new PSD leader, Pedro Santana Lopes as Prime Minister, angering many socialists. This decision resulted in the resignation of Eduardo Ferro Rodrigues from the leadership of the party.

== Candidates ==
=== Declared ===
Name	Born	Experience
José Sócrates	6 September 1957 (age 47); Alijó	Member of Parliament for Castelo Branco (1987–2011); Minister of the Environment (1999–2002); Minister in the Cabinet of the Prime Minister (1997–1999); Secretary of State Assistant to the Minister of the Environment (1995–1997)
Manuel Alegre	12 May 1936 (age 68); Águeda	Vice President of the Assembly of the Republic (1995–2009); Member of Parliament for Coimbra (1975–2009); Member of the Council of State (1996–2002); Secretary of State Assistant to the Prime Minister for Political Affairs (1977–1978); Secretary of State for Social Communication (1976–1977)
João Soares	29 August 1949 (age 55); Lisbon	Member of Parliament from Lisbon (2002–2009); Mayor of Lisbon (1995–2001); Member of Parliament from Lisbon (1987–1991)

=== Declined ===
- António Vitorino – incumbent European Commissioner for Justice and Home Affairs (1999–2004); former minister of Presidency and Defence (1995–1997)
- António José Seguro – incumbent leader of the Socialist parliamentary group (2004–2005); former minister in the Cabinet of the Prime Minister (2001–2002)

== Notable endorsements ==
João Soares

Presidents of the Republic

- Mário Soares – President of the Republic (1986–1996), Prime Minister (1976–1978; 1983–1985) (Candidate's father)

Members of Parliament

- Alfredo Barroso – Member of the Assembly of the Republic (1980–1987)
- Carlos Manuel Luís – Member of the Assembly of the Republic (1985–2005)
- Luís Filipe Madeira – Member of the Assembly of the Republic (1975–1976, 1980–1983, 1991–1999), Civil Governor of Faro (1974–1975) and MEP (1986–1989)
- Margarida Ramos Carvalho – Member of the Assembly of the Republic (1976–1979)
- Maria Barroso – First Lady (1986–1996), Member of the Assembly of the Republic (1976–1980; 1983–1985) (Candidate's mother)
- Rui Cunha – Member of the Assembly of the Republic (1975, 1978, 1989–2005)
- Vítor Ramalho – Member of the Assembly of the Republic (1999–2009)

Members of European Parliament

- Maria Belo – MEP (1989–1994)

Individuals

- António Dias da Cunha – President of Sporting CP (2000–2005)
- Maria Antónia Palla – Journalist, writer and feminist activist
- Duarte Lynce de Faria – Scholar and Member of the Alcácer do Sal Municipal Assembly
José Sócrates

Ministers

- Alberto Costa – Minister of Internal Administration (1995–1997)
- António Correia de Campos – Minister of Health (2001–2002)
- António Vitorino – European Commissioner for Justice and Home Affairs (1999–2004) and Minister of Presidency and Defence (1995–1997)
- Fernando Gomes – Minister of Internal Administration (1999–2000), Mayor of Porto (1989–1999) and Vila do Conde (1974–1981), MEP (1986–1989) and Member of the Assembly of the Republic (2000–2005)
- Jaime Gama – Minister of Foreign Affairs (1983–1985, 1995–2002), Minister of National Defence (1999), Minister of the Internal Administration (1978) and Member of the Assembly of the Republic (1976–2011)
- Jorge Coelho – Minister of State (1999–2001), Minister of Internal Administration (1997–1999) and Member of the Assembly of the Republic (1987–1995, 2002–2006)
- José Lello – Minister of Sports and the Youth (2000–2002)
- Luís Capoulas Santos – Minister of Agriculture (1998–2002)

Members of Parliament

- António Campos – Member of the Assembly of the Republic (1975–1995)
- António Ramos Preto – Member of the Assembly of the Republic (2002–2015)
- Carlos César – Member of the Assembly of the Republic (1987–1991) and President of the Regional Government of the Azores (1996–2012)
- Fernando Serrasqueiro – Member of the Assembly of the Republic (1995–2015)
- José Lamego – Member of the Assembly of the Republic (1991–1995, 2002–2005)
- Pedro Silva Pereira – Member of the Assembly of the Republic (2002–2005)

Members of European Parliament

- António Costa – MEP (2004–2005), Minister of Justice (1999–2002), Minister of Parliamentary Affairs (1997–1999), Member of the Assembly of the Republic (1991–1995)
- Edite Estrela – MEP (2004–2014), Mayor of Sintra (1993–2001) and Member of the Assembly of the Republic (1987–1993)
- Francisco Assis – MEP (2004–2009) and Mayor of Amarante (1989–1995)
- Sérgio Sousa Pinto – MEP (1999–2009) and Member of the Assembly of the Republic (1995–1999)

Individuals

- José Luís Carneiro – City councilour in Baião
- Marcos Perestrello
Manuel Alegre

Ministers

- Alberto Martins – Minister for State Reform and Public Administration (1999-2002) and Member of the Assembly of the Republic (1987–2017)
- Augusto Santos Silva – Minister of Culture (2001–2002), Minister of Education (2000–2001) and Member of the Assembly of the Republic (1995–2000, 2002–2024)
- João Cravinho – Minister of Territory Administration (1995–1999), Member of the Assembly of the Republic (1979–1983, 1985–1989 and 1999–2002) and MEP (1989–1994)
- José Medeiros Ferreira – Minister of Foreign Affairs (1976–1977), Member of the Assembly of the Republic (1975–1976, 1977–1980, 1985–1986, 1995–2005) and MEP (1986–1989)
- José Vera Jardim– Minister of Justice (1995–1999) and Member of the Assembly of the Republic (1987–1995, 1999–2009)
- Manuel Maria Carrilho – Minister of Culture (1995–2000) and Member of the Assembly of the Republic (2000–2008)
- Maria de Belém Roseira – Minister for Equality (1999–2000), Minister of Health (1995-1999) and Member of the Assembly of the Republic (2000–2015)
- Paulo Pedroso – Minister of Labour and Solidarity (2001–2002) and Member of the Assembly of the Republic (1999–2005)

Members of Parliament

- Ana Catarina Mendes – Member of the Assembly of the Republic (1995–2024)
- Ana Maria Benavente – Member of the Assembly of the Republic (2000–2005) and Secretary of State of Education and Innovation (1995–2000)
- Delmiro Carreira – Member of the Assembly of the Republic (1975–1979) and President of the Union of Bankers from the South and Islands
- Helena Roseta – Member of the Assembly of the Republic (1975–1982, 1987–2005) and Mayor of Cascais (1982–1985)
- José Leitão – Member of the Assembly of the Republic (1976–1980; 1983–1985; 1991–2005)
- José Magalhães – Member of the Assembly of the Republic (1983–2022)
- Jorge Lacão – Member of the Assembly of the Republic (1983–2022)
- Osvaldo Sarmento e Castro – Member of the Assembly of the Republic (1975–1979, 1995–2011)

Members of European Parliament

- Ana Gomes – MEP (2004–2019) and Portuguese Ambassador to Indonesia (2000–2003)

Mayors

- Manuel Machado – Mayor of Coimbra (1989–2001)

Individuals

- António Mega Ferreira – Writer and Journalist (Independent)
- Boaventura de Sousa Santos – Sociologist and scholar (Independent)
- Carlos Trindade – Union Leader and Coordinator of the Socialist Tendency of CGTP-IN
- Fernando Valle – Honorary President of the PS; doctor, Civil Governor of Coimbra (1976–1980) and Founder of PS
- Maria João Seixas – Writer and Journalist
- Maria Lúcia Lepecki – Scholar of Literature (Independent)
Refused to Endorse

Ministers

- António José Seguro – incumbent leader of the Socialist parliamentary group (2004–2005); Minister in the Cabinet of the Prime Minister (2001–2002)
- Eduardo Ferro Rodrigues – incumbent Secretary–General of the Socialist Party (2002–2004) and Minister of Solidarity (1995–2002)

Individuals

- Pedro Nuno Santos – Secretary General of the Socialist Youth
- Pedro Adão e Silva – Sociologist and Member of Ferro Rodrigues Secretariat

== Results ==
=== National summary ===
Candidate	25 & 26 September 2004	
Candidate	Votes	%
José Sócrates	28,984	79.51
Manuel Alegre	5,693	15.62
João Soares	1,505	4.13
Total	36.182	
Valid votes	36,182	99.26
Invalid and blank ballots	271	0.74
Votes cast / turnout	36,453	48.20
Registered voters	75,628	
Source: Acção Socialista

Vote share
José Sócrates	79.51%
Manuel Alegre	15.62%
João Soares	4.13%
Blank/Invalid	0.74%

=== Results by party federation ===
The following table shows a breakdown of the results of the election by party federation, which are mostly equal to the electoral circles

Federation	José Sócrates		Manuel Alegre		João Soares		Turnout	Registered
Federation	Votes	%	Votes	%	Votes	%	%	Registered
Algarve	957	71.7	358	26.8	20	1.6	58.5	2,292
Aveiro	1,304	75.2	362	20.9	69	4.0	47.6	3,657
Baixo Alentejo	466	76.0	101	16.5	46	7.5	43.8	1,398
Braga	3,226	86.8	420	11.3	72	1.9	40.5	9,235
Bragança	510	78.6	122	18.8	17	2.6	47.0	1,386
Castelo Branco	739	92.0	61	7.6	3	0.4	67.5	1,194
Coimbra	1,969	78.6	493	19.7	42	1.7	48.8	5,162
Évora	290	70.6	102	24.8	19	4.6	51.8	803
Guarda	358	74.3	111	23.0	13	2.7	45.4	1,080
Leiria	888	77.1	227	19.7	37	3.2	55.7	2,082
Lisbon: Urban Area	4,775	73.1	1,256	19.3	498	7.7	55.7	11,769
Lisbon: Oeste	320	82.3	56	14.4	13	3.3	53.4	730
Portalegre	449	84.2	73	13.7	11	2.1	46.8	1,143
Porto	5,804	87.0	716	10.7	150	2.2	46.8	14,320
Santarém	772	73.7	234	22.3	42	4.0	49.4	2,140
Setúbal	1,607	72.4	397	17.9	215	9.7	48.6	4,613
Viana do Castelo	746	88.4	59	7.0	39	4.6	40.7	2,100
Vila Real	926	90.1	101	9.8	1	0.1	56.7	1,821
Viseu	1,096	87.1	152	12.1	10	0.8	49.3	2,564
Azores	779	83.7	120	12.9	32	3.4	30.7	3,050
Madeira	898	83.8	120	11.2	54	5.0	41.7	2,587
Emigration	125	44.8	52	18.6	102	36.6	58.4	502

== See also ==
- Elections in Portugal
- List of political parties in Portugal
