= 2013 Portuguese Socialist Party leadership election =

2013 Socialist Party leadership election
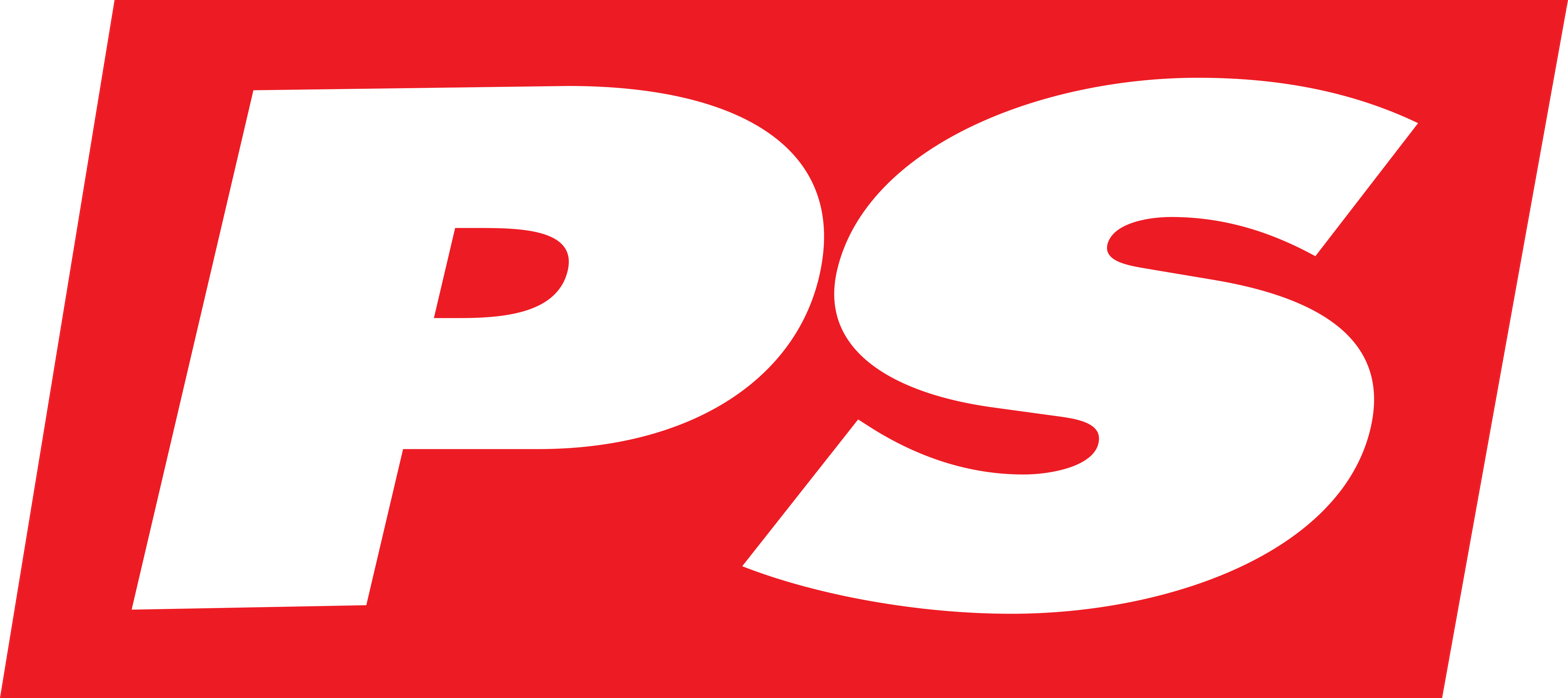
- 13 April 2013
- Turnout: 62.1%
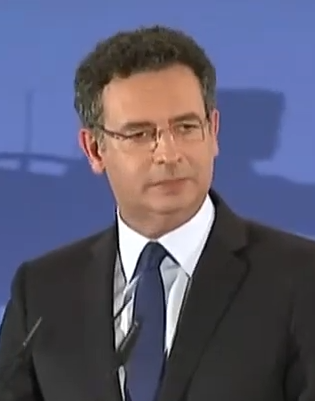
		AP
Candidate	António José Seguro	Aires Pedro
Popular vote	24,843	892
Percentage	93.0%	3.3%
Secretary-General before election
António José Seguro
Elected Secretary-General
António José Seguro

The 2013 Portuguese Socialist Party leadership election was held on 13 April 2013 to elect a new Secretary-General of the Socialist Party.

The incumbent Secretaty-general, António José Seguro, ran for re-election, despite much criticism within the party. Meanwhile, after much speculation about a potential candidacy from Mayor of Lisbon António Costa, an agreement was made between Seguro and Costa in order to prevent a leadership challenge.

Seguro's only opposition was Madeiran lawyer Aires Pedro, who announced his candidacy after Costa's decision not to run. In the end, Seguro defeated Aires Pedro in a landslide, winning 93% of the votes.

== Candidates ==
=== Declared ===
Name	Born	Experience
António José Seguro	11 March 1962 (age 51); Penamacor	Leader of the Opposition (2011–2014); Secretary-general of the Socialist Party (2011–2014); Member of Parliament for Braga (2005–2014); Parliamentary leader of the Socialist Party (2004–2005); Minister in the Cabinet of the Prime Minister (2001–2002); Member of the European Parliament (1999–2001); Secretary of State Assistant to the Prime Minister (1997–1999); Secretary of State for Youth (1995–1997); Member of Parliament for Guarda (1995–1999); Secretary-general of the Socialist Youth (1990–1994); Member of Parliament for Porto (1991–1995); Member of Parliament for Lisbon (1985–1987; 2002–2005)
Aires Pedro	1973 (age 40); Funchal	Lawyer; Member of the National Jurisidiction Commission of the Socialist Party (formerly)

=== Withrew ===
- João Nogueira Santos – innovation manager

=== Declined ===
- António Costa – incumbent Mayor of Lisbon (2007–2015); former Minister of Internal Administration (2005–2007); former Minister of Justice (1999–2002); former Minister of Parliamentary Affairs (1997–1999)

== Opinion polling ==
Hypothetical polling

Polling firm	Fieldwork date	Sample size	António José Seguro	António Costa	Francisco Assis	José Sócrates	Others/ Undecided	Lead
Pitagórica	19–24 Mar 2013	503	23.3	43.2	11.0	4.5	18.0	19.9
Pitagórica	20–24 Feb 2013	503	19.6	42.5	6.8	5.0	26.1	22.9
Pitagórica	22–25 Jan 2013	504	18.2	41.8	9.4	4.3	26.3	23.6
Pitagórica	9–12 Nov 2012	505	17.2	48.5	7.5	6.0	20.8	31.3
Pitagórica	8–13 Oct 2012	503	18.8	40.2	11.4	4.4	25.2	21.4

== Results ==
Summary of the April 2013 PS leadership election results
Candidate	13 April 2013	
Candidate	Votes	%
António José Seguro	24,843	92.96
Aires Pedro	892	3.34
Total	25,735	
Valid votes	25,735	96.30
Invalid and blank ballots	990	3.70
Votes cast / turnout	26,725	62.10
Registered voters	43,034	
Sources: Expresso

Vote share
António José Seguro	92.96%
Aires Pedro	3.34%
Blank/Invalid	3.70%
