= Jorge Seguro Sanches =

Portuguese politician (born 1965)

Secretary of State for National Defence
- In office 26 October 2019 – 30 March 2022
- Prime Minister: António Costa
- Preceded by: Ana Santos Pinto
- Succeeded by: Marco Capitão Ferreira

Secretary of State for Energy
- In office 26 November 2015 – 17 October 2018
- Prime Minister: António Costa
- Preceded by: Artur Trindade
- Succeeded by: João Galamba

Member of the Assembly of the Republic
- In office 31 March 2022 – 25 March 2024
- Constituency: Setúbal
- In office 18 September 2006 – 19 June 2011
- Constituency: Castelo Branco
- In office 2 November 2005 – 14 January 2006
- Constituency: Castelo Branco

Personal details
- Born: Jorge Filipe Teixeira Seguro Sanches; 30 July 1965 (age 60) Penamacor, Portugal
- Party: Socialist Party
- Occupation: Politician

Jorge Filipe Teixeira Seguro Sanches (born 30 July 1965) is a Portuguese politician who has served as Secretary of State for National Defence from 2019 until 2022 and as Secretary of State for Energy from 2015 until 2018. He was also a member of the Assembly of the Republic from 2005 until 2011 and from 2022 until 2024.

== Biography ==
Seguro Sanches was born in Penamacor, in 1965. He studied Law in the Lusíada University of Lisbon, later doing three post-graduations in International Relations, Energy Law and Water Law.

As a member of the Socialist Party (PS), during António Guterres' time as Prime Minister, Seguro Sanches was the chief of staff for several Ministers and Secretaries of State, including his cousin, future President António José Seguro.

He joined the Assembly of the Republic for the first time following the 2005 legislative election as deputy from Castelo Branco, being in office from November 2005 until January 2006 and from September 2006 until June 2011.

He was appointed by António Costa as the Secretary of State for Energy in his first government, being in office until October 2018, and, in his second government he became the Secretary of State for National Defence.

Following the 2022 legislative election, he returned to Parliament, this time as a deputy from Setúbal, being in office until 2024.

In February 2026 he became the Director-general for Consumer Affairs.
