= July 2011 Portuguese Socialist Party leadership election =

July 2011 Socialist Party leadership election
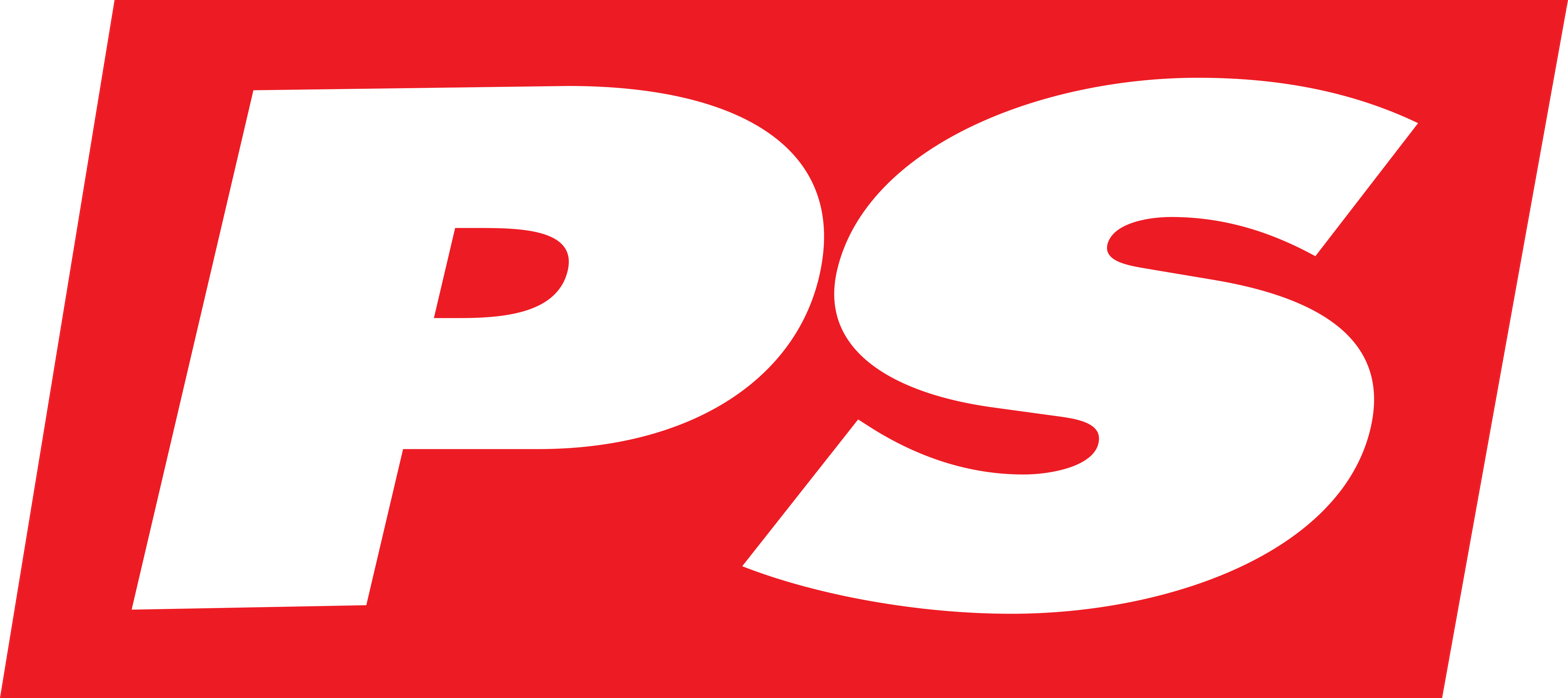
- 22–23 July 2011
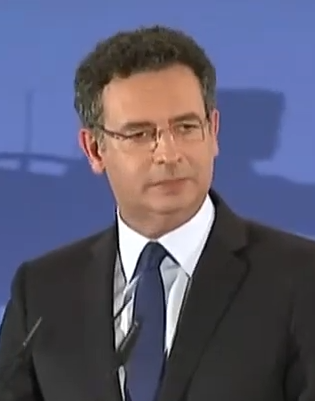

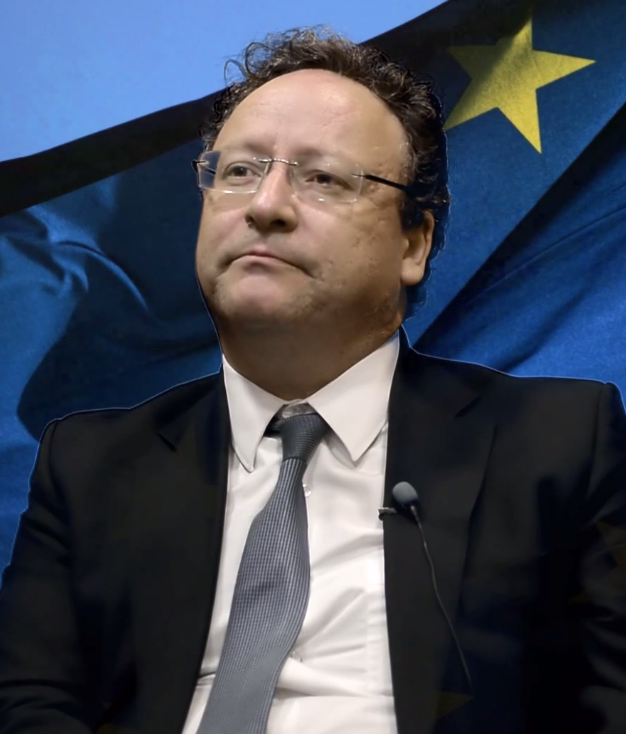
Candidate	António José Seguro	Francisco Assis
Popular vote	23,903	11,257
Percentage	67.3%	31.7%
Secretary-General before election
José Sócrates
Elected Secretary-General
António José Seguro

The July 2011 Portuguese Socialist Party leadership election was held on 22 and 23 July 2011. The leadership ballot was called after former Prime Minister and Socialist Party Secretary-General José Sócrates resigned as leader of the PS, following the party's defeat on the 2011 legislative elections.

The declared candidates included the former Minister in the Cabinet of the Prime Minister António José Seguro and Member of Parliament Francisco Assis. Seguro won and became the 7th Secretary-General of the Socialist Party.

== Candidates ==
=== Declared ===
Name	Born	Experience
António José Seguro	11 March 1962 (age 49); Penamacor	Member of Parliament for Braga (2005–2014); Parliamentary leader of the Socialist Party (2004–2005); Minister in the Cabinet of the Prime Minister (2001–2002); Member of the European Parliament (1999–2001); Secretary of State Assistant to the Prime Minister (1997–1999); Secretary of State for Youth (1995–1997); Member of Parliament for Guarda (1995–1999); Secretary-general of the Socialist Youth (1990–1994); Member of Parliament for Porto (1991–1995); Member of Parliament for Lisbon (1985–1987; 2002–2005)
Francisco Assis	8 January 1965 (age 46); Amarante	Member of Parliament for Porto (2011–2014; 1995–2004); Parliamentary leader of the Socialist Party (1997–2002; 2009–2011); Member of Parliament for Guarda (2009–2011); Member of the European Parliament (2004–2009); Mayor of Amarante (1989–1995)

=== Declined ===
- António Costa – incumbent Mayor of Lisbon (2007–2015); former Minister of Internal Administration (2005–2007); former Minister of Justice (1999–2002); former Minister of Parliamentary Affairs (1997–1999)
- Maria de Belém Roseira – incumbent parliamentary leader (2011); former Minister of Health (1995–1999) and Equality (1999–2000)

== Campaign period ==
=== Candidates' debates ===
Only one debate was held between both candidates for the Socialist Party's leadership on television, while two more debates were held with PS members in Lisbon and Porto.

2011 Portuguese Socialist Party leadership election
Date	Time	Organisers	Moderator(s)	P Present S Absent invitee N Non-invitee		
Date	Time	Organisers	Moderator(s)	António José Seguro	Francisco Assis	Refs
13 Jul	22H	SIC Notícias	Ana Lourenço	P	P	

== Opinion polling ==
=== All voters ===
Polling firm	Fieldwork date	Sample size			Others/ Undecided	Lead
Polling firm	Fieldwork date	Sample size	Seguro	Assis	Others/ Undecided	Lead
Aximage	5–8 Jul 2011	600	42.2	30.6	27.2	11.6
Eurosondagem	26–28 Jun 2011	1,010	35.2	45.6	19.2	10.4

=== PS voters ===
Polling firm	Fieldwork date	Sample size			Others/ Undecided	Lead
Polling firm	Fieldwork date	Sample size	Seguro	Assis	Others/ Undecided	Lead
Aximage	5–8 Jul 2011	103	42.3	34.9	22.8	7.4
Eurosondagem	26–28 Jun 2011	280	43.2	39.6	17.2	3.6

== Results ==
=== National summary ===
Candidate	22 & 23 July 2011	
Candidate	Votes	%
António José Seguro	23,903	67.28
Francisco Assis	11,257	31.69
Total	35,160	
Valid votes	35,160	98.97
Invalid and blank ballots	367	1.03
Votes cast / turnout	35,527	?
Registered voters	?	

Vote share
António José Seguro	67.28%
Francisco Assis	31.69%
Blank/Invalid	1.03%

== See also ==
- Elections in Portugal
- List of political parties in Portugal
