= António José Seguro =

President of Portugal since 2026

His Excellency António José Seguro BTO
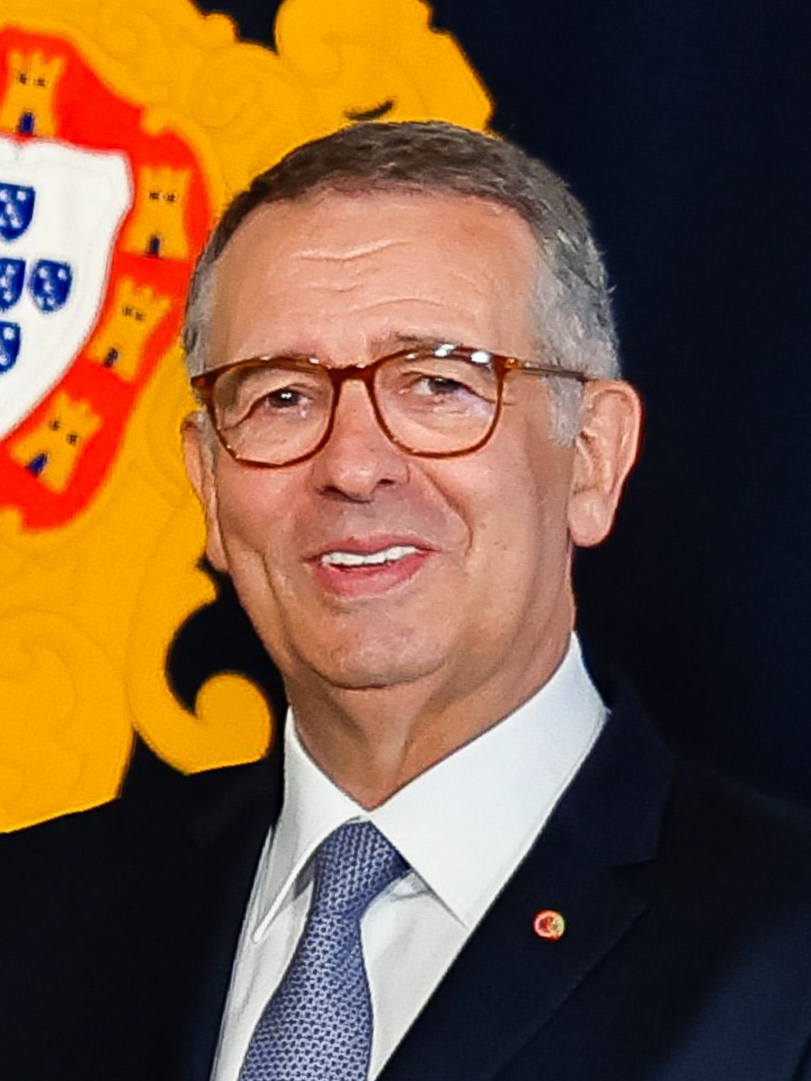
- Seguro in 2026

21st President of Portugal
- Incumbent
- Assumed office 9 March 2026
- Prime Minister: Luís Montenegro
- Preceded by: Marcelo Rebelo de Sousa

Leader of the Opposition
- In office 23 July 2011 – 28 September 2014
- Prime Minister: Pedro Passos Coelho
- Preceded by: José Sócrates
- Succeeded by: António Costa

Secretary-General of the Socialist Party
- In office 23 July 2011 – 28 September 2014
- President: Maria de Belém Roseira
- Preceded by: José Sócrates
- Succeeded by: António Costa

Minister in the Cabinet of the Prime Minister
- In office 3 July 2001 – 8 April 2002
- Prime Minister: António Guterres
- Preceded by: Armando Vara
- Succeeded by: José Luís Arnaut
Junior ministerial offices
Secretary of State Assistant to the Prime Minister
In office 25 November 1997 – 20 July 1999
Prime Minister	António Guterres
Preceded by	Luís Marques Guedes
Succeeded by	Vitalino Canas
Secretary of State for Youth Affairs
In office 28 October 1995 – 25 November 1997
Prime Minister	António Guterres
Preceded by	Maria do Céu Ramos
Succeeded by	Miguel Fontes
Parliamentary offices
President of the Parliamentary Group of the Socialist Party
In office 31 March 2004 – 9 March 2005
Preceded by	António Costa
Succeeded by	Alberto Martins
Member of the Assembly of the Republic
In office 10 March 2005 – 8 October 2014
Constituency	Braga
In office 5 April 2002 – 9 March 2005
Constituency	Lisbon
In office 4 November 1991 – 26 October 1995
Constituency	Porto
Member of the European Parliament
In office 20 July 1999 – 2 July 2001
Succeeded by	Manuel António dos Santos
Constituency	Portugal
Party political offices
Secretary-General of the Socialist Youth
In office 29 April 1990 – 6 March 1994
Preceded by	José Apolinário
Succeeded by	Sérgio Sousa Pinto
Member of the National Secretariat of the Socialist Party
In office 23 February 1992 – 21 January 2002
Leader	António Guterres

Personal details
- Born: António José Martins Seguro; 11 March 1962 (age 64) Penamacor, Castelo Branco, Portugal
- Party: Socialist Party (since 1981)
- Spouse: Margarida Maldonado Freitas (m. 2001)
- Children: 2
- Education: ISCTE – Lisbon University Institute; Autonomous University of Lisbon
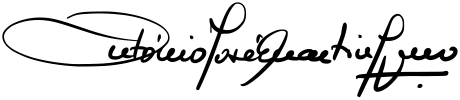
- Signature

António José Martins Seguro (Note: European Portuguese pronunciation: [ɐ̃ˈtɔniu ʒuˈzɛ mɐɾˈtĩʃ sɨˈɣuɾu]) (born 11 March 1962) is a Portuguese politician who has been the president of Portugal since 2026, having won the 2026 Portuguese presidential election. A member of the Socialist Party (PS), Seguro previously served as secretary-general of the PS from 2011 to 2014, during which time he was also the leader of the opposition.

== Early life and education ==
Seguro was born on 11 March 1962 in Penamacor, the third and youngest son of Domingos Sanches Seguro (1925–2017) and Maria do Céu Martins (1927–2012). The family comprised mostly rural workers from the Beira Baixa region; Seguro's father, Domingos, ran a newsagent's.

His early studies were undertaken in Penamacor in the Preparatory School Ribeiro Sanches and in the Nossa Senhora do Incenso Day School, before he went to Castelo Branco to finish high school in the Industrial and Commercial School. During this time, he was arrested before the Carnation Revolution, while still a minor.

In his youth, Seguro ran a local newspaper, A Verdade de Penamacor, with his cousin Jorge Seguro Sanches. In 1982, during a visit of President António Ramalho Eanes to Penamacor, Seguro diverged First Lady Manuela Eanes from the presidential entourage, interviewing her.

He entered politics at a very young age and became a member of the Portuguese Socialist Party (PS) in February 1981, when he was 18 years old. He attended the 1st cycle program in business organization and management at the ISCTE – Lisbon University Institute, but he did not graduate. Seguro has a degree in international relations awarded later by the Autonomous University of Lisbon.

== Career ==
=== Early activism ===
Seguro became involved in political activities from a very young age, always linked to the PS. As a member of the Socialist Youth (JS), he was elected as president of the National Youth Council (CNJ) in 1985, an office he held until 1990, and was in the following year involved in Mário Soares' 1986 presidential campaign. As president of the CNJ, we was responsible for several negotiations with the government of Aníbal Cavaco Silva that introduced the youth card and the network of youth hostels. He also later became chairman of the Youth Forum of the European Communities.

In 1986, after a temporary short stay in the Assembly of the Republic during the 4th Legislature, Seguro was a candidate for Chair of the Castelo Branco Federation of the PS against the incumbent José Sócrates, who was seeking reelection to a second two-years term. Sócrates ended up beating Seguro, winning 56 delegates against Seguro's 20.

In 1990, Seguro was elected as Secretary.general of the Socialist Youth with 85% of the delegates, succeeding José Apolinário. At the time, the JS was facing financial and mobilization issues. In his first campaign as leader of the JS, in the 1991 legislative election, he organized a groundbreaking campaign, distributing 250,000 condoms. Despite the PS and Jorge Sampaio's defeat, Seguro ended up being elected for the first time to Parliament. As Secretary-general of the JS, Seguro fought in parliament for the end to the compulsory military service and against the Indonesian occupation of East Timor, which led to his arrest in the Expo '92 in Seville for protesting in front of the Indonesian Pavillion.

During the election night of the 1991 legislative election, Seguro spent the night in António Guterres' house, being one of the first people to support Guterres' bid for the leadership of the PS. After Guterres was elected as Secretary-general of the party in 1992, Seguro joined his secretariat, becoming a part of the inner circle of the leadership of the Party.

After being re-elected in December 1991 in a landslide, despite opposition from two lists headed by Luís Miguel Duarte and Daniel Adrião, Seguro left the leadership of the Socialist Youth in March 1994, being succeeded by Sérgio Sousa Pinto.

=== Secretary of state, MEP and minister ===
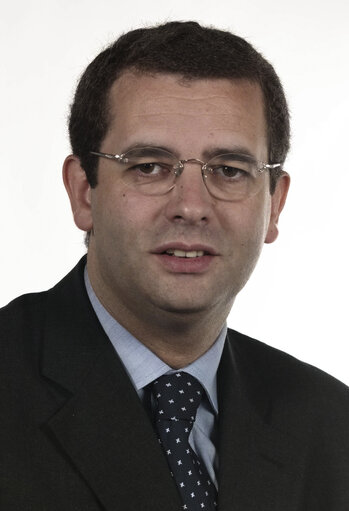
Official portrait as an MEP, 1999

In the lead up to the 1995 legislative election, Seguro was one of the people tasked with organizing Guterres' campaign, alongside Jorge Coelho as the national campaign director. Seguro organized the national caravan that was held following the Estados Gerais, inspired by Clinton-Gore caravan in the 1992 United States presidential election. With the purpose of replacing the party's aesthetic in favour of a more national inspired identity for the campaign, Seguro conceived for this caravan several graphic elements that became strongly associated with António Guterres and the Socialist Party, such as replacing the party flags with the national flag and using the song Conquest of Paradise to replace the party's anthem.

With Seguro as the main candidate from Guarda, the PS won the legislative elections, leaving Guterres to form a government. Seguro then joined the government for the first time as Secretary of State for Youth Affairs and later, in 1997, he became Secretary of State Assistant to the Prime Minister.

During this time, Seguro rose in the ranks of the PS, becoming the coordinator of the Standing Committee of PS and being the party's coordinator for the 1997 local elections, being elected as President of the Municipal Assembly of Penamacor in that same election.

Seguro left the government to run in the 1999 European Parliament election, being the second name in a list led by former President Mário Soares. Seguro served as an MEP between July 1999 and July 2001, being an effective member of the Committee on Constitutional Affairs (in these functions he was co-author of the Report on the Treaty of Nice and the Future of the European Union), and was also a substitute for the Commission for Employment and Social Affairs. He was also president of the Delegation for Relations with Central America and Mexico, vice president of the Socialist Group in the European Parliament and president of the Portuguese Socialist delegation.

Seguro resigned as an MEP in July 2001 to serve as Minister in the Cabinet of the Prime Minister, again under António Guterres. After Guterres' resignation and the party's narrow defeat in the 2002 legislative election, he returned to the Assembly of the Republic, serving as the Socialist Parliamentary leader from 2004 to 2005. He accumulated this position with the membership in the Municipal Assembly of Gouveia after being elected in the 2001 local elections.

After Ferro Rodrigues' resignation as Secretary-general of PS in 2004, Seguro was considered as a potential candidate for the leadership election, but he was convinced by Jorge Coelho not to run since it was "not his time". From then on, he became a backbencher, only taking slightly relevant positions in the leadership of the Parliamentary committees of Education and Science, and later of Economic Affairs, Innovation and Energy. He also opposed the leadership of José Sócrates in several moments, breaking party discipline to vote against the party finances law, oppose consumption tax increases and defending a referendum on the Treaty of Lisbon.

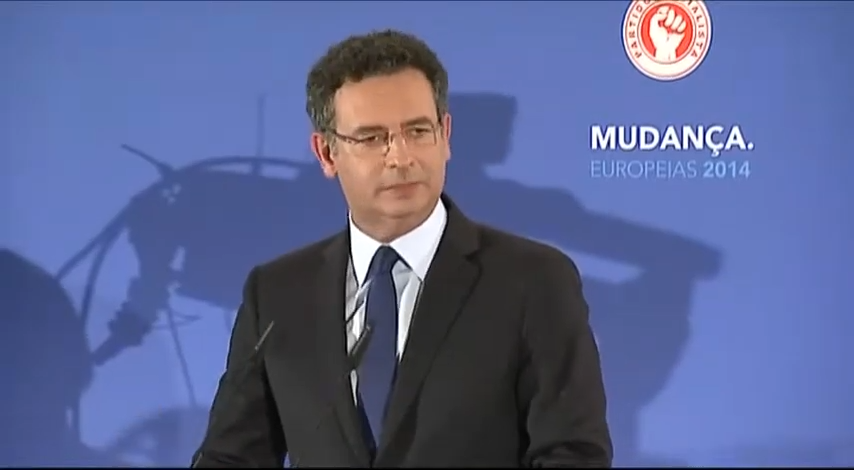
Seguro on the election night of the 2014 European Parliament election in Portugal

=== Secretary-general of the Socialist Party ===
After Prime Minister José Sócrates resigned as PS General Secretary on the election night of 5 June 2011, having lost the general election by a margin higher than expected, Seguro was elected leader of the party on 23 July 2011, winning 68% of the vote against his challenger, Francisco Assis, who got 32%.

As secretary-general, Seguro decided to abstain in the 2012 State Budget proposed by the Passos Coelho government, citing his decision as a "violent, but constructive abstention", a decision that ended up attracting criticism from inside the PS. Under Seguro's leadership, the Socialist Party managed to achieve one of its best results ever in the 2013 local elections and won the 2014 European Parliament election in Portugal with Francisco Assis as the main candidate, although by a narrow margin. The results of the 2014 elections were considered narrow and insufficient, which motivated the Mayor of Lisbon António Costa to defy Seguro and run for the party leadership.

At the first primaries open to party supporters, Costa defeated Seguro by a landslide. Seguro resigned from the leadership the same day, leaving Costa as Secretary-general. Seguro then retired to private life. Having successfully defended his Master thesis, he started teaching in the Department of International Relations of the Autonomous University of Lisbon.

=== 2026 presidential campaign ===
In October 2024, then PS leader Pedro Nuno Santos mentioned Seguro as a potential candidate for president from the Socialist Party in the 2026 presidential election. In November 2024, after being mostly out of the spotlight since 2014, Seguro gave an interview to CNN Portugal as he was starting a role as a political commentator on the channel, stating that he was interested in running for president. Seguro then positioned himself as the main candidate from the party in opposition to others like Mário Centeno, António Vitorino and Augusto Santos Silva. He also founded the movement UPortugal, with the intention of promoting a greater participation from the citizens and fighting misinformation. In June 2025, he announced he was running for president, stating that "the country needs change and hope in a better life", defining his candidacy as a progressive alternative to the other conservative candidates, such as Luís Marques Mendes and Henrique Gouveia e Melo.

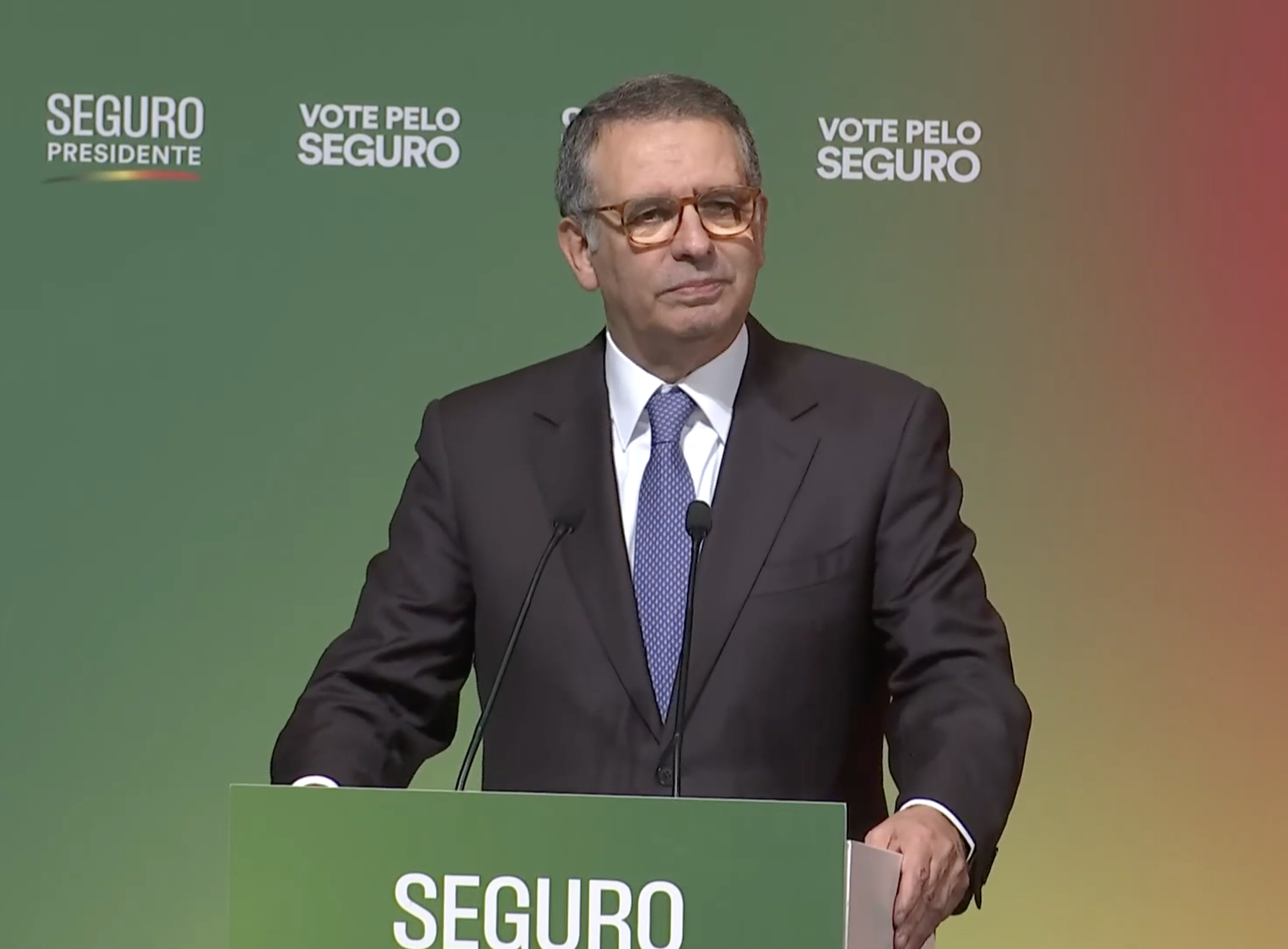
Seguro delivering the victory speech on the night of the first round of the 2026 election

Seguro launched his campaign on 15 June 2025, in Caldas da Rainha, with the presence of major PS personalities like Francisco Assis, Alberto Martins, Maria de Belém Roseira, João Soares and Álvaro Beleza, saying that, after leaving politics at a time when he could divide the party, he was now returning with the intention to unite the country. In the coming weeks, Seguro gained the support of most of the establishment of the PS, receiving the endorsement of more than half of the party federation chairs and more than 100 incumbent mayors. Despite that, José Luís Carneiro, the leader of PS, said that the party would only officially back any of the presidential candidates after the 12 October local elections.

Seguro received the official support of the Socialist Party on 19 October 2025, with the proposal for his support being written by the Secretary-general José Luís Carneiro and by the party's president Carlos César. Seguro chose scientist Maria do Carmo Fonseca as his national campaign chair, MP Paulo Lopes Silva as his campaign director, and former minister Guilherme d'Oliveira Martins as campaign chair for the Lisbon district. Seguro formalized his candidacy on 15 December 2025, delivering 10,000 signatures to the Constitutional Court.

In the first round of the 2026 presidential election on 18 January, no candidates secured a majority; Seguro won a relative majority of 31%, and André Ventura (leader of the right-wing populist party Chega) came second with 23.5%; the two most-voted candidates faced each other in a second round run-off on 8 February. This was only the second time that a direct Portuguese presidential election was not won on the first ballot, as in the 1986 election. In his first-round victory speech, in Caldas da Rainha Cultural and Congress Centre, a hoarse Seguro underlined the non-partisan nature of his campaign and invited all "democrats, progressives, and humanists" to support him in the second round in order to "defeat extremism and those who sow hatred and division among the Portuguese", distancing himself from his opponent. On the election night and the following day, Seguro received the endorsement of several important figures of the centre-right to right-wing political parties PSD, IL and CDS–PP.

Seguro won the second round by a landslide, beating André Ventura with 66.8% of the votes, being elected President. He won the record of the highest number of votes cast for him in a presidential election, after receiving more than 3.5 million votes. In his victory speech, he promised that things would not be kept the same and that he would be the president of "all, all, all of the Portuguese".

== Presidency (2026–present) ==
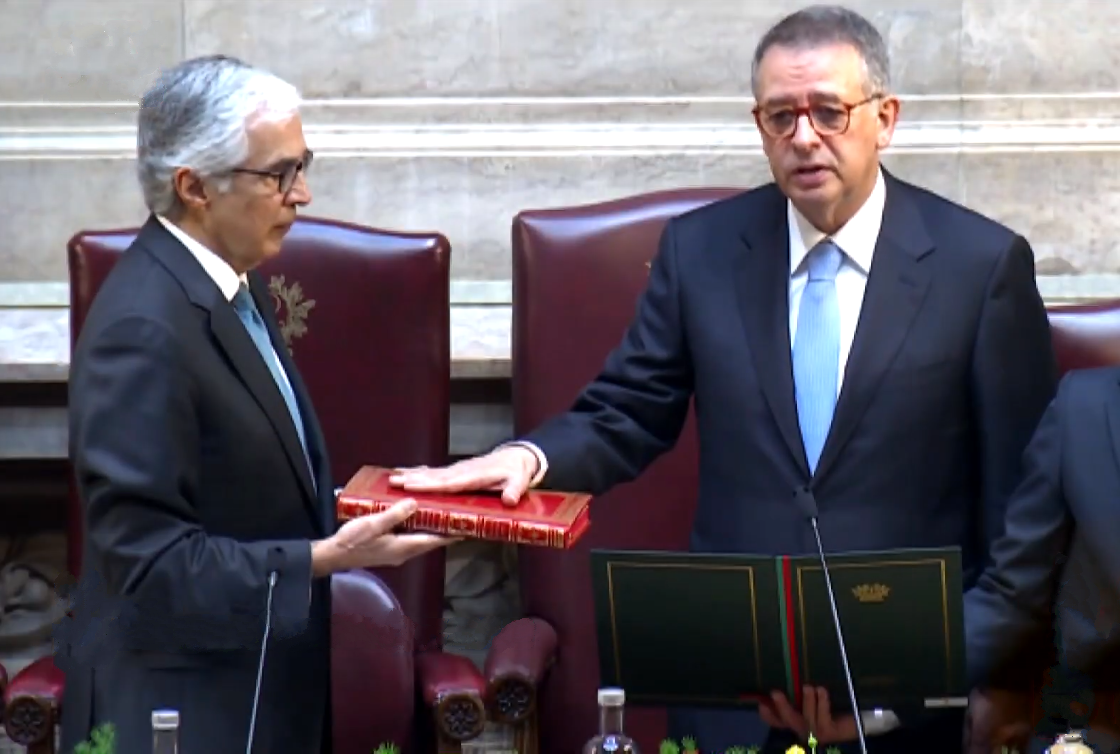
Seguro taking the oath of office

António José Seguro took office on 9 March 2026, in the Assembly of the Republic, having in attendance King Felipe VI of Spain, president João Lourenço of Angola, president Daniel Chapo of Mozambique, president José Ramos-Horta of Timor-Leste, president José Maria Neves of Cape Verde and president Carlos Vila Nova of São Tomé e Príncipe.

On 2 April 2026, Seguro was present in the solemn ceremony for the 50th anniversary of the 1976 Constitution, where he said that the country's problems do not come from the constitution itself, but from its non-compliance, amidst talks about a constitutional review done between PSD, Chega and IL.

As President, Seguro brought back the Open Presidencies (Presidências Abertas) that had been started by Mário Soares, with his first open presidency being in the areas impacted by Storm Kristin in Leiria, Castelo Branco, Coimbra and Santarém.

On 3 May 2026, Seguro promulgated the revised Nationality Law, which doubles the standard naturalisation residency requirement from five to ten years (seven for EU and CPLP nationals). While signing the decree, he stated that a reinforced-value law of such importance "should also be based on greater consensus around its essential principles", and stressed that pending applications must not be adversely affected by the legislative change and that statutory naturalisation timelines must not be undermined by administrative delays of the state. He did not promulgate a separate decree introducing loss of nationality as an accessory criminal penalty, which would be shut down by the Constitutional Court.

Seguro's style as president has been described as different from the previous presidents, being more silent but focused on pointing to the problems and producing documents to register his concerns and orientations about the issues.

== Honours and awards ==
=== Portuguese orders ===
==== Insignia of Office ====
- Grand Master of the Honorific Orders of Portugal (2026–present)

=== Foreign orders ===
- Cape Verde: 1st Class of the Order of Amílcar Cabral (22 July 2026)

== Electoral history ==
Year	Election	Office	Party	Pos.	Votes		#	Status	Notes
Year	Election	Office	Party	Pos.	Total	%	#	Status	Notes
1985	Legislative election in Lisbon	Assembly of the Republic	PS	21/56	255,030	19.80 / 100.00	4th	Not elected	Later joined parliament as an MP.
1989	European Parliament election	European Parliament	PS	19/24	1,184,380	28.54 / 100.00	2nd	Not elected	
1991	Legislative election in Porto	Assembly of the Republic	PS	9/37	313,893	32.92 / 100.00	2nd	Elected	
1993	Local election in Penamacor	Municipal Assembly	PS	1/15	2,260	41.69 / 100.00	1st	Elected	Elected president of the Municipal Assembly of Penamacor.
1995	Legislative election in Guarda	Assembly of the Republic	PS	1/4	49,498	43.65 / 100.00	1st	Elected	
1999	European Parliament election	European Parliament	PS	2/25	1,493,146	43.07 / 100.00	1st	Elected	
2001	Local election in Gouveia	Municipal Assembly	PS	1/23	4,563	43.98 / 100.00	2nd	Elected	
2002	Legislative election in Lisbon	Assembly of the Republic	PS	7/48	440,790	38.66 / 100.00	1st	Elected	Elected president of the Socialist parliamentary group in 2004.
2005	Legislative election in Braga	Assembly of the Republic	PS	1/18	218,665	45.44 / 100.00	1st	Elected	
2009	Legislative election in Braga	Assembly of the Republic	PS	1/19	207,695	41.73 / 100.00	1st	Elected	
2011	Legislative election in Braga	Assembly of the Republic	PS	1/19	159,477	32.85 / 100.00	2nd	Elected	
2011	Socialist Party leadership election	Secretary-general of the Socialist Party	PS	—N/a	23,903	67.28 / 100.00	1st	Elected	
2013	Socialist Party leadership election	Secretary-general of the Socialist Party	PS	—N/a	24,843	92.96 / 100.00	1st	Elected	
2014	Socialist Party prime ministerial primary	PS candidate for Prime Minister in the 2015 legislative election	PS	—N/a	55,928	31.54 / 100.00	2nd	Not elected	
2026	Presidential election	President of the Republic	PS (also VP)	—N/a	1,755,563	31.11 / 100.00	1st	Runoff	
2026	Presidential election	President of the Republic	PS (also VP, L, PCP, BE, PAN)	—N/a	3,502,613	66.84 / 100.00	1st	Elected	

=== PS leadership election, 2011 ===
Ballot: 22 and 23 July 2011
Candidate	Votes	%
António José Seguro	23,903	67.3
Francisco Assis	11,257	31.7
Blank/Invalid ballots	367	1.0
Turnout	35,527	
Source: Diretas 2011

=== PS leadership election, 2013 ===
Ballot: 13 April 2013
Candidate	Votes	%
António José Seguro	24,843	93.0
Aires Pedro	892	3.3
Blank/Invalid ballots	990	3.7
Turnout	26,725	62.10
Source: Diretas 2013

=== PS primary election, 2014 ===
Ballot: 28 September 2014
Candidate	Votes	%
António Costa	120,188	67.8
António José Seguro	55,928	31.5
Blank/Invalid ballots	1,234	0.7
Turnout	177,350	70.71
Source: Resultados

=== Presidential election, 2026 ===
Ballot: 18 January and 8 February 2026
Candidate	First round		Second round	
Candidate	Votes	%	Votes	%
António José Seguro	1,755,563	31.1	3,502,613	66.8
André Ventura	1,327,021	23.5	1,737,950	33.2
João Cotrim de Figueiredo	903,057	16.0		
Henrique Gouveia e Melo	695,377	12.3		
Luís Marques Mendes	637,442	11.3		
Catarina Martins	116,407	2.1		
António Filipe	92,644	1.6		
Manuel João Vieira	60,927	1.1		
Jorge Pinto	38,588	0.7		
André Pestana	10,897	0.2		
Humberto Correia	4,773	0.1		
Blank/Invalid ballots	125,840	–	275,414	–
Turnout	5,768,536	52.39	5,515,977	50.03
Source: Comissão Nacional de Eleições

== Notes ==
Political offices
Vacant Title last held by Armando Vara	Minister in the Cabinet of the Prime Minister; 2001–2002	Succeeded by José Luís Arnaut
Preceded by Pedro Passos Coelho	Leader of the Opposition; 2011–2014	Succeeded by António Costa
Preceded by Marcelo Rebelo de Sousa	President of Portugal; 2026–present	Incumbent
Party political offices
Preceded by José Apolinário	Secretary-General of the Socialist Youth; 1990–1994	Succeeded by Sérgio Sousa Pinto
Preceded by Alberto Martins	President of the Parliamentary Group of the Socialist Party; 2004–2005	Succeeded by António Costa
Preceded by José Sócrates	Secretary-General of the Socialist Party; 2011–2014	Succeeded by António Costa
