= Fernando Valle =

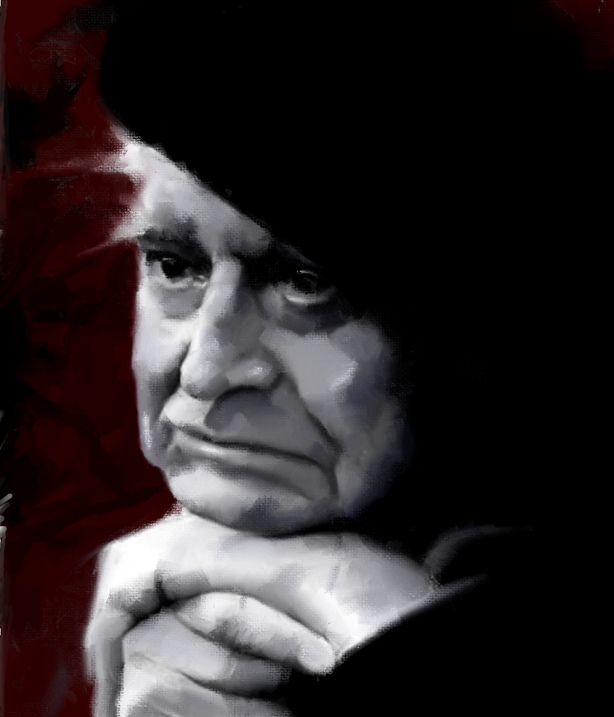
Fernando Valle

Fernando Baeta Cardoso do Valle (30 July 1900 – 27 November 2004) was a Portuguese physician and politician, who was one of the founders of the Socialist Party. He was the Honorary President of the Socialist Party from 1999 until his death.

== Biography ==
He was born in Arganil in a Republican family. He studied Medicine in the University of Coimbra, becoming a physician, holding a private clinic where he treated the poor.

During the Estado Novo regime, he was an active member of the presidential candidacies of Norton de Matos in 1949, Manuel Quintão Meireles in 1951 and Humberto Delgado in 1958. He was also a candidate for the National Assembly in the Democratic Opposition lists and a member of several organizations in the opposition, such as the Republican and Socialist Alliance (along with Norton de Matos and Mendes Cabeçadas), the Movement of Democratic Unity, and the Portuguese Socialist Action. He was arrested by the PIDE between April and June 1962, in the Aljube jail.

He was one of the founders of the Socialist Party (PS) in 1973. After the Carnation Revolution, he held a more discreet role, being the first mayor of Arganil after the revolution and becoming Civil Governor of the Coimbra District from 1976 until 1980. After Manuel Tito de Morais' death in 1999, he became the new Honorary President of the PS, becoming at times a voice against the leadership of the party. He was a supporter of Manuel Alegre's candidacy in the 2004 leadership election.

He died in Coimbra, in 2004, at 104 years old.
