= Maria do Carmo Fonseca =

Portuguese scientist, Molecular Biologist

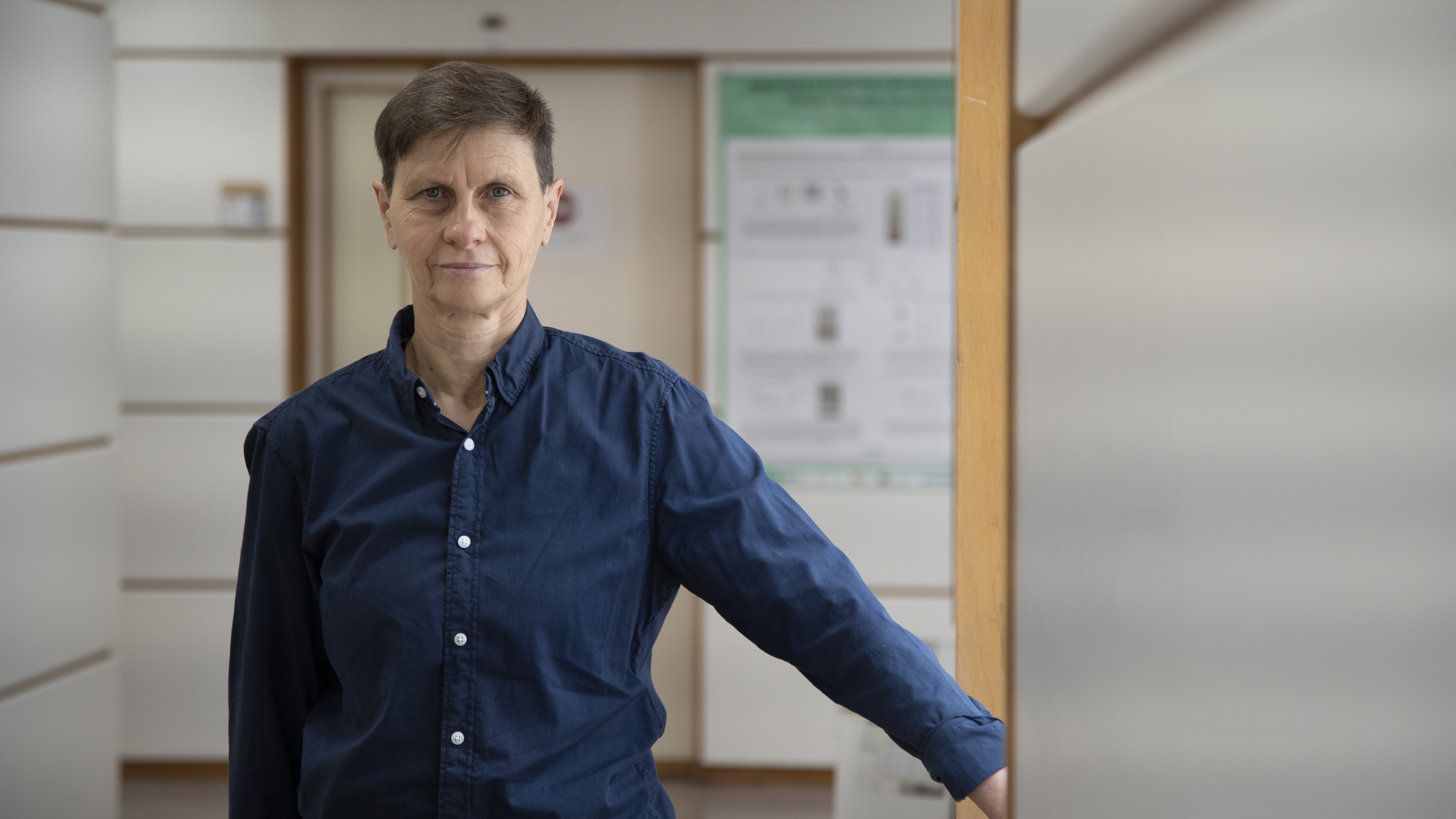
- Born: 9 August 1959 (age 67); Almada, Portugal
- Education: University of Lisbon

Maria do Carmo Fonseca (born Almada, Portugal, 9 August 1959) is a Portuguese scientist, full professor of Molecular Cell Biology and Onco-biology at the University of Lisbon Medical School and president of the Instituto de Medicina Molecular João Lobo Antunes (Molecular Medicine Institute at the University of Lisbon).

Her research is focused in pre-mRNA splicing and aims to contribute to the development of new diagnostic approaches and treatment strategies for related diseases.

She was announced as the national campaign chair of António José Seguro's 2026 presidential campaign.

== Scientific trajectory ==
After studying medicine at University of Lisbon, Maria do Carmo Fonseca completed her PhD in 1988. She broadened her studies in institutions such as the European Molecular Biology Laboratory (EMBL), in Germany. She then became a professor at the University of Lisbon.

In 2011 she travelled to the United States to work as a visiting professor at Harvard Medical School for two years, and was director of the Harvard Medical School-Portugal Program from 2009 to 2015.

== Memberships and honours ==
She is member of the Portuguese Academy of Sciences, the European Molecular Biology Organization (EMBO) and the Portuguese Academy of Medicine and editor for the Journal of Cell Science and the RNA journal.

She has received the Portuguese Pfizer Research Prize, the José Sala-Trepat Prize, the Iberian DuPont Science Award in 2002, the Gulbenkian Science Award in 2007, the Prémio Pessoa National Award in Arts, Science and Culture in 2010, and the Prémio D. Antónia Ferreira Portuguese award for Entrepreneurial women in 2013.
