= António Mega Ferreira =

Portuguese writer and journalist (1949–2022)

António Taurino Mega Ferreira GCC GCCa (24 March 1949 – 26 December 2022) was a Portuguese writer and journalist.

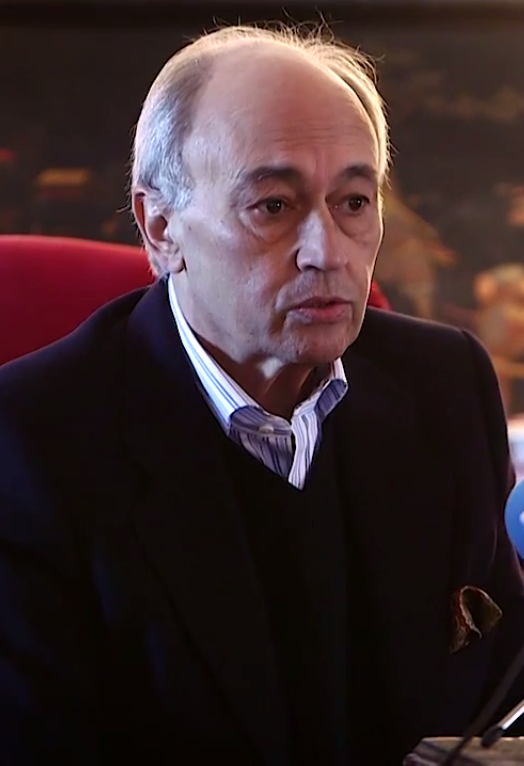
António Mega

== Publications ==
- Graça Morais: linhas da terra (1985)
- O heliventilador de Resende (1985)
- As palavras difíceis (1991)
- Os princípios do fim: poemas 1972–1992 (1992)
- Os nomes da Europa (1994)
- A borboleta de Nabokov (2000)
- A expressão dos afectos (2001)
- Amor: novela (2002)
- As caixas chinesas (2002)
- Retratos de sombra (2003)
- O que há-de voltar a passar: narrativa (2003)
- Roma: exercícios de reconhecimento (2003)
- Fotobiografia Teixeira de Pascoaes (2003)
- Uma caligrafia de prazeres (2003)
- Amor (2004)
- Fazer pela vida: um retrato de Fernando Pessoa, o empreendedor (2005)
- Graça Morais: os olhos azuis do mar (2005)
- Abel Salazar: o desenhador compulsivo (2006)
- Por D. Quixote : o literato, o justiceiro e o amoroso (2006)
- A blusa romena: romance (2008)
- Lisboa song (2009)
- Roma (2010)
- Papéis de jornal: crónicas (2011)
- Macedo: uma biografia da infâmia (2011)
- Cartas de Casanova: Lisboa 1757 (2013)
- O essencial sobre Marcel Proust (2013)
- O essencial sobre Albert Camus (2013)
- Viagem à literatura europeia (2014)
- Vidas instáveis (2014)
- Viagens pela ficção hispano-americana (2015)
- O essencial sobre Dom Quixote (2016)
- Itália – Práticas de viagem (2017)
