= Sérgio Sousa Pinto =

Portuguese politician

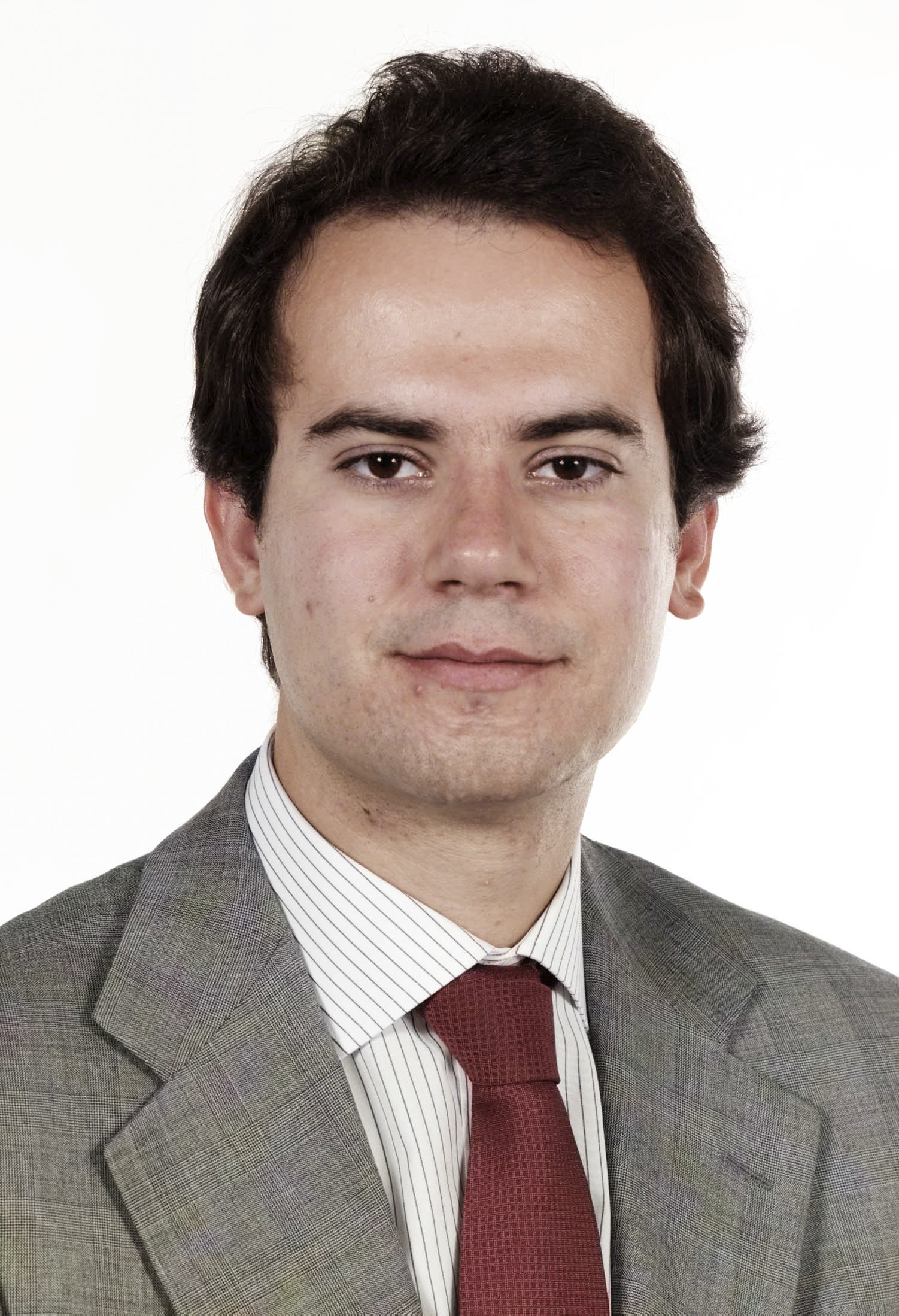
Sousa Pinto in 1999 as a MEP

Sérgio Paulo Mendes de Sousa Pinto (born July 29, 1972 in Lisbon) is a Portuguese former politician and Member of the European Parliament for the Socialist Party; part of the Party of European Socialists.

== Political career ==
=== Member of the European Parliament, 1999–2009 ===
Sousa Pinto first entered the European Parliament following the 1999 European elections. Between 1999 and 2004, he served on the Committee on Citizens' Freedoms and Rights, Justice and Home Affairs before moving to the Committee on Constitutional Affairs in 2004. In addition, he was the chairman of the parliament's delegation for relations with Mercosur.

=== Member of the Portuguese Parliament, 2011–2025 ===
Sousa Pinto was a member of the Assembly of the Republic since his election in the 2011 national elections. In 2013, he succeeded Alberto Martins as chairman of the Committee on Foreign Affairs and Portuguese Communities.

Sousa Pinto resigned from the PS leadership for disagreeing with the party's leader, António Costa, on forming a parliamentary alliance with three euroskeptic left wing parties after the 2015 national elections.

== Links ==
Webpage of the MEP
