= Alberto Martins =

Portuguese lawyer and politician (born 1945)

Member of the Council of State
- Incumbent
- Assumed office 17 April 2026
- President: António José Seguro

Minister of Justice
- In office 26 October 2009 – 21 June 2011
- Prime Minister: José Sócrates
- Preceded by: Alberto Costa
- Succeeded by: Paula Teixeira da Cruz

Minister of State Reform and Public Administration
- In office 25 October 1999 – 6 April 2002
- Prime Minister: António Guterres

Member of the Assembly of the Republic
- In office 27 October 1995 – 20 July 2017
- Constituency: Porto
- In office 4 November 1991 – 26 October 1995
- Constituency: Braga
- In office 13 August 1987 – 3 November 1991
- Constituency: Porto

Personal details
- Born: 25 April 1945 (age 80) Guimarães, Portugal
- Party: Socialist Party
- Other political affiliations: Movement of Socialist Left (1974–c. 1985)
- Occupation: Lawyer; Politician

Alberto de Sousa Martins GCL GOC (born 25 April 1945, Guimarães, Portugal) is a Portuguese lawyer and politician, who has served as Minister of State Reform and Public Administration from 1999 to 2002, and as Minister of Justice from 2009 to 2011.

== Biography ==
Alberto Martins was born in Guimarães, on 25 April 1945.

Martins was one of the main figures from the 1969 academic crisis in Portugal, when, as President of the Academic Association of Coimbra, he asked President Américo Tomás to speak against the Estado Novo regime.

After the Carnation Revolution, he joined the Movement of Socialist Left, a marxist political party, being one of the main figures of the party. He later left the party and joined the center-left Socialist Party, being elected an MP for the first time in 1987. He was subsequently re-elected in 1991, 1995, 1999, 2002, 2005, 2009, 2011 and 2015.

In 1999, he was appointed by António Guterres as Minister of State Reform and Public Administration, serving as minister until the fall of the government in 2002. Afterwards, he was parliamentary leader during the 10th legislature, from 2005 to 2009, until he assumed the office of Minister of Justice in the second José Sócrates' government. He returned again to the post of parliamentary leader from 2013 to 2014, leaving the office after the election of António Costa as leader of PS.

Alberto Martins resigned as an MP in July 2017, after 30 years in office. After leaving office, he was a candidate for President of the Municipal Assembly of Porto in the 2021 local election, and supported António José Seguro in the 2026 presidential election. Following Seguro's victory, he was appointed to the Council of State.

He was made Grand Cross of the Order of Liberty in 1999, by President Jorge Sampaio. He was also made Grand Officer of the Order of Christ in 2024, by President Marcelo Rebelo de Sousa.

== Published works ==
- "New Citizen's Rights' (Don Quixote, 1994)
- 'Right to Citizenship ", (Don, 2000 - Lisbon)
