= Francisco Assis =

Portuguese politician (born 1965)

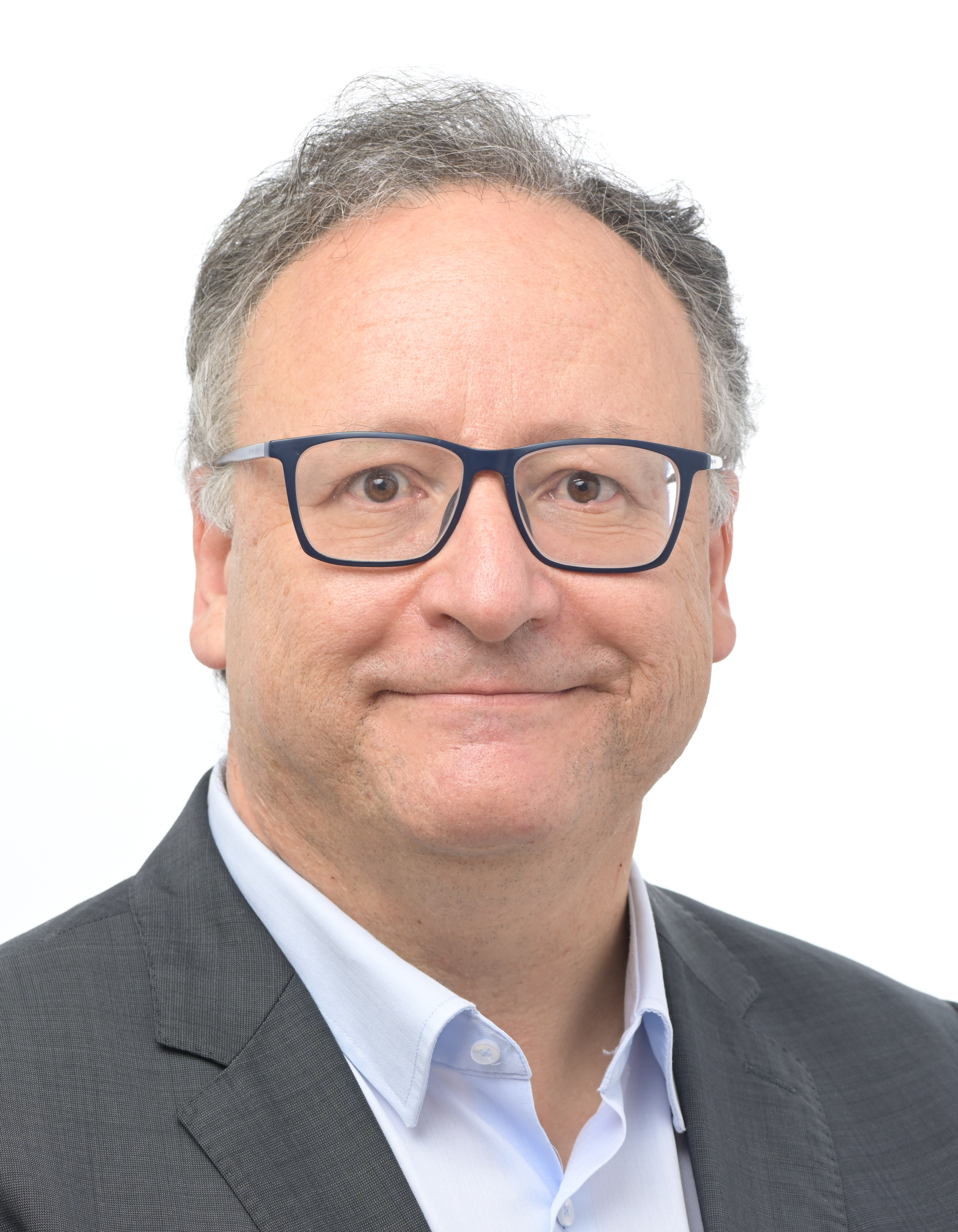
- Official portrait, 2024

Member of the European Parliament for Portugal
- Incumbent
- Assumed office 16 July 2024
- In office 1 July 2014 – 1 July 2019
- In office 20 July 2004 – 13 July 2009

Member of the Assembly of the Republic
- In office 26 March 2024 – 26 June 2024
- Constituency: Porto
- In office 15 October 2009 – 30 June 2014
- Constituency: Guarda (2009–2011); Porto (2011–2014)
- In office 27 October 1995 – 19 July 2004
- Constituency: Porto

Mayor of Amarante
- In office 17 December 1989 – 26 October 1995
- Preceded by: Joaquim Teixeira
- Succeeded by: Armindo Abreu

Personal details
- Born: Francisco José Pereira de Assis Miranda; 8 January 1965 (age 61) Amarante, Portugal
- Party: Socialist Party (since 1985)
- Other political affiliations: Party of European Socialists
- Spouse: Vanda Teixeira Pinto
- Education: University of Porto
- Occupation: Teacher • Politician

Francisco José Pereira de Assis Miranda (born 8 January 1965) is a Portuguese politician who served as a Member of the European Parliament (MEP) for the Socialist Party. He was part of the Party of European Socialists from 2004 to 2009, and again from 2014 until 2019. He is also a former mayor of Amarante, having been in office from 1989 to 1995, and member of the Assembly of Republic on two occasions, the first from 1995 to 2004 and the second from 2009 to 2014.

Assis was elected a Member of the European Parliament in the 2024 European election, and is expected to be sworn-in in the upcoming Tenth European Parliament.

== Political career ==
=== Role in national politics ===
Assis challenged incumbent António José Seguro for the party leadership in 2011. When the right-wing coalition government of Prime Minister Pedro Passos Coelho lost its absolute majority in parliament as a result of the 2015 Portuguese legislative election, Assis condemned what he described as "left-wing fantasies" within his own Socialist Party, describing any attempt at an agreement with the Portuguese Communist Party and the Left Bloc as "absurd". On 24 November 2015, Socialist leader António Costa was appointed as Prime Minister after forming a parliamentary alliance with three left-wing parties. Assis publicly voiced his opposition to the new coalition agreement, which he reaffirmed in the context of the 2017 Portuguese local elections and in the aftermath of the October 2017 Iberian wildfires.

=== Member of the European Parliament (2014–2019) ===
Ahead of the 2014 European Parliament election in Portugal, the Socialist Party named Assis at the top of their list. Following elections, he became a member of the Committee on Foreign Affairs and the Subcommittee on Human Rights. He was also the chairman of the parliament's delegation for relations with Mercosur. Assis has been a political commentator for television programmes on TV stations SIC Notícias and TVI 24 and a columnist for the newspaper Público.

== Electoral history ==
=== Amarante City Council election, 1989 ===
Ballot: 17 December 1989
Party	Candidate	Votes	%	Seats	+/−
PS	Francisco Assis	12,767	45.6	4	+2
PSD	–	9,290	33.2	2	–2
CDS	–	3,987	14.3	1	±0
CDU	–	1,027	3.7	0	±0
Blank/Invalid ballots		902	3.2	–	–
Turnout		27,973	67.13	7	±0
Source: Autárquicas 1989

=== Amarante City Council election, 1993 ===
Ballot: 12 December 1993
Party	Candidate	Votes	%	Seats	+/−
PS	Francisco Assis	18,732	58.8	5	+1
PSD	João Mota	10,638	33.4	2	±0
CDS–PP	–	1,296	4.1	0	–1
CDU	–	483	1.5	0	±0
Blank/Invalid ballots		707	2.2	–	–
Turnout		31,856	71.52	7	±0
Source: Autárquicas 1989

=== Porto City Council election, 2005 ===
Ballot: 9 October 2005
Party	Candidate	Votes	%	Seats	+/−
PSD/CDS–PP	Rui Rio	63,443	46.2	7	+1
PS	Francisco Assis	49,653	36.1	5	–1
CDU	Rui Sá	12,311	9.0	1	±0
BE	João Teixeira Lopes	5,797	4.2	0	±0
Other parties		1,756	1.3	0	±0
Blank/Invalid ballots		4,420	3.2	–	–
Turnout		137,380	58.43	13	±0
Source: Autárquicas 2005

=== PS leadership election, 2011 ===
Ballot: 22 and 23 July 2011
Candidate	Votes	%
António José Seguro	23,903	68.0
Francisco Assis	11,257	32.0
Blank/Invalid ballots	367	–
Turnout	35,527	
Source: Diretas 2011

=== European Parliament election, 2014 ===
Ballot: 25 May 2014
Party	Candidate	Votes	%	Seats	+/−
PS	Francisco Assis	1,034,249	31.5	8	+1
PSD/CDS–PP	Paulo Rangel	910,647	27.7	7	–3
CDU	João Ferreira	416,925	12.7	3	+1
MPT	Marinho e Pinto	234,788	7.2	2	+2
BE	Marisa Matias	149,764	4.6	1	–2
Livre	Rui Tavares	71,495	2.2	0	new
PAN	Orlando Figueiredo	56,431	1.7	0	new
PCTP/MRPP	Leopoldo Mesquita	54,708	1.7	0	±0
Other parties		111,765	3.4	0	±0
Blank/Invalid ballots		243,681	7.4	–	–
Turnout		3,284,452	33.67	21	–1
Source: Comissão Nacional de Eleições
