= Penamacor =

- Municipality
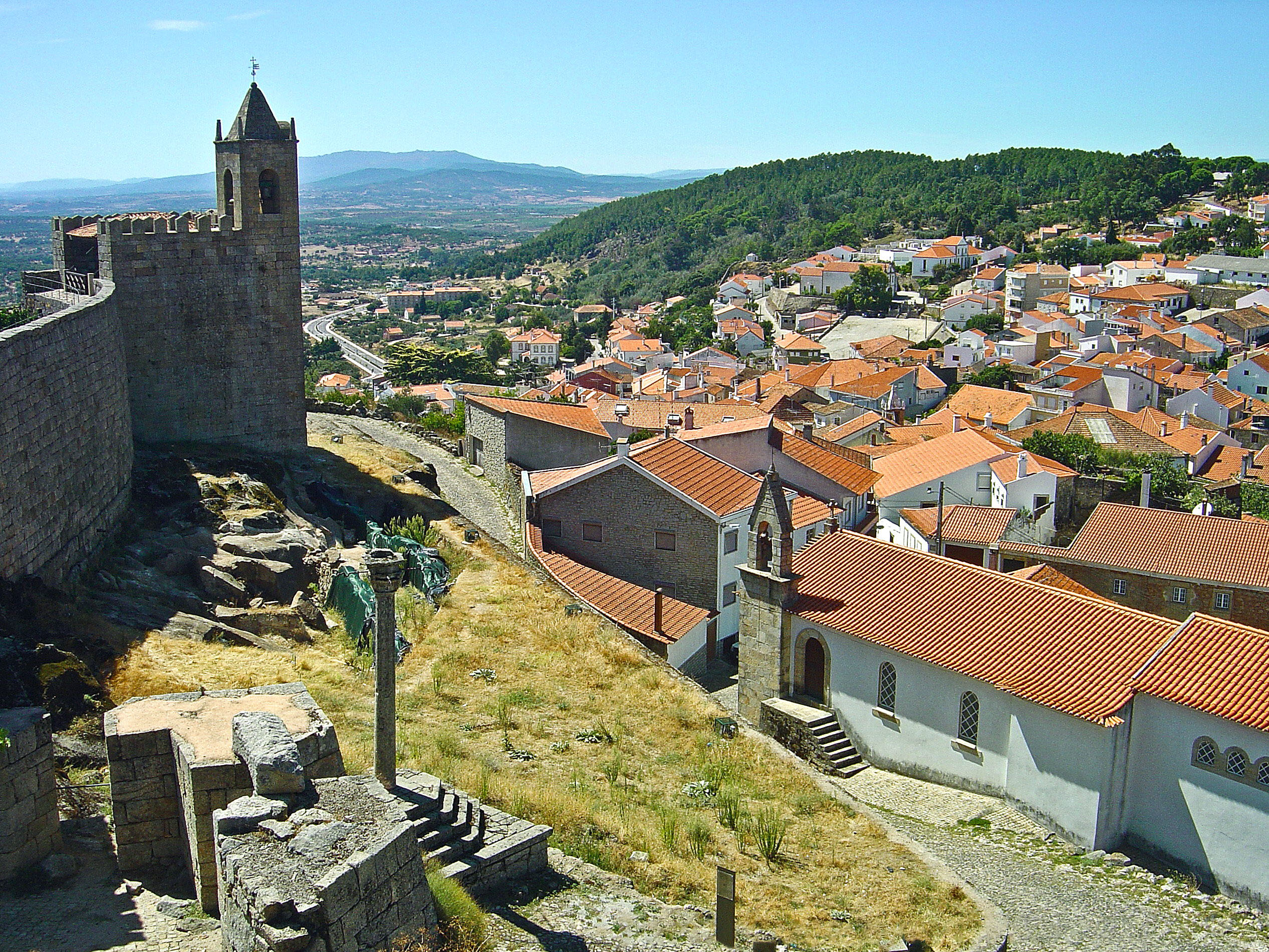
- View of Penamacor

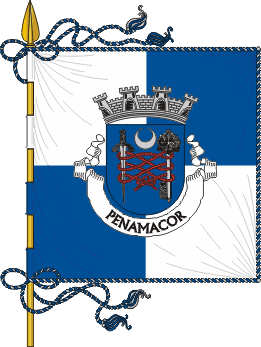
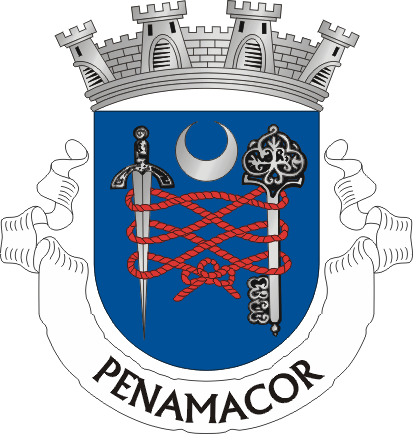
- Flag Coat of arms
- Interactive map of Penamacor
- Coordinates: 40.1683°N 7.1672°W
- Country: Portugal
- Region: Centro
- Intermunic. comm.: Beira Baixa
- District: Castelo Branco
- Parishes: 9

Government
  - President: António Luís Beites Soares (PS)

Area
  - Total: 563.71 km^{2} (217.65 sq mi)

Population (2011)
  - Total: 5,682
  - Density: 10.08/km^{2} (26.11/sq mi)
- Time zone: UTC+00:00 (WET)
  - Summer (DST): UTC+01:00 (WEST)
- Local holiday: Easter Monday date varies
- Website: http://www.cm-penamacor.pt

Penamacor (Portuguese pronunciation: [pɨnɐmɐˈkoɾ] or [ˌpenɐmɐˈkoɾ]) is a municipality in the district of Castelo Branco in Portugal. The population in 2011 was 5,682, in an area of 563.71 square kilometres (217.65 sq mi).

The mayor is António Luís Beites Soares. The municipal holiday is Easter Monday.

== History ==
Penamacor's history begins to take shape more clearly only under the reign of Sancho I of Portugal (1185-1211). This town has been the homeland of Vamba, the king of the Visigoths, who ruled the Iberian Peninsula from 672 to 682.

Dom Sancho I conquered Penamacor from the Muslims, granted it a charter in 1199, elevating it to a town, and donated its domains to the Knights Templar under the leadership of their master, Dom Gualdim Pais, who fortified it. The sovereign confirmed its charter in 1209.

"In the name of God. This is the charter [of charter] that I, Sancho, by the grace of God king of Portugal, ordered to be made for you, inhabitants of Penamacor, both present and future. First, we grant you that two-thirds of the knights take part in the royal fossade once a year and that the third part remains in the town with all the foot soldiers. And the knight who is not in the fossade with the king shall pay 10 soldos for the fossade. And whoever commits murder shall pay 30 morabitinos to the plaintiff for the murder. And the plaintiff shall deliver one-seventh of that amount to the palace. And if someone is killed in self-defense, nothing shall be paid for him. And if someone breaks into a house, crossing the threshold with weapons, [...] with shields, with spears, or with swords, or with knives, or with leeks, or with stones, shall pay 500 soldos to the plaintiff, and the seventh to the palace. [...] The false witness and the repeat liar shall pay 60 soldos and the seventh to the palace and be expelled from the council. [...]. Whoever has a farm and a team of oxen and ten sheep and a donkey and two beds shall buy a horse. The woman who abandons her husband [...] shall pay her husband 300 soldos and the seventh to the palace. Whoever catches his wife in known adultery shall leave her and keep all her belongings, and pay 1 dinero to the judge. [...] Whoever hits another man's wife shall pay her 60 soldos, if she is married. And if she is not married, shall pay 30 soldos and the seventh to the palace and be an enemy to her relatives. [...] The tents, the mills, and the ovens of Penamacor shall be exempt from all dues. [...] The inhabitants of Penamacor shall not be stewards or servants against their will [...]. The men of Penamacor shall not provide lodging against their will. [...] The men of Penamacor shall not pay tolls throughout our kingdom." (Charter of Penamacor, 1209)

According to one of the local legends, the name of the town may originate from an outlaw who lived here, named "Macôr." This bandit lived in a cave called Penha. Over time, the name changed, and it came to be called Pena, thus the land became known as Penha de Macôr or Pena Macôr.

According to another version, a fierce fight between its inhabitants and bandits resulted in so much bloodshed and of such a bad color that the town came to be known as Penha de má cor (Penha of bad color). Another version suggests that in this area, there were two settlements, both located on hills, Pena de Garcia and Pena Maior. With the alteration of Castilian pronunciation, Magor became Macor, giving rise to Pena Macor.

The development of the town in the late 12th century was due to the need to protect the Portuguese border, leading to the construction of a castle (Penamacor Castle), of which there are still remnants today, considered a national monument.

== Climate ==
Penamacor has a Mediterranean climate (Köppen: Csa) with hot, dry summers and cool, rainy winters. Located on the southern foothills of the Serra da Malcata, the town experiences some rain shadow when compared to places to the north and west (e.g. Fundão, shown below); with precipitation being strongly seasonal and concentrated in the autumn and winter months, while summers are generally dry.

Climate data for Penamacor (Fundão), 1991–2020 normals, extremes 1971-2020, altitude: 495 m (1,624 ft)
Month	Jan	Feb	Mar	Apr	May	Jun	Jul	Aug	Sep	Oct	Nov	Dec	Year
Record high °C (°F)	21.8 (71.2)	24 (75)	27.8 (82.0)	30.0 (86.0)	34.9 (94.8)	41.5 (106.7)	41.7 (107.1)	42.3 (108.1)	40.7 (105.3)	35.1 (95.2)	24.8 (76.6)	20.4 (68.7)	42.3 (108.1)
Mean daily maximum °C (°F)	11.9 (53.4)	13.5 (56.3)	16.5 (61.7)	18.7 (65.7)	22.8 (73.0)	28.1 (82.6)	31.9 (89.4)	31.8 (89.2)	27.3 (81.1)	21.0 (69.8)	14.9 (58.8)	12.3 (54.1)	20.9 (69.6)
Daily mean °C (°F)	7.3 (45.1)	8.4 (47.1)	11.2 (52.2)	13.1 (55.6)	16.6 (61.9)	20.9 (69.6)	23.9 (75.0)	23.9 (75.0)	20.3 (68.5)	15.6 (60.1)	10.5 (50.9)	7.8 (46.0)	15.0 (59.0)
Mean daily minimum °C (°F)	2.7 (36.9)	3.4 (38.1)	5.7 (42.3)	7.6 (45.7)	10.3 (50.5)	13.7 (56.7)	16.0 (60.8)	16.1 (61.0)	13.4 (56.1)	10.2 (50.4)	6.1 (43.0)	3.4 (38.1)	9.0 (48.2)
Record low °C (°F)	−7.2 (19.0)	−8.1 (17.4)	−5.8 (21.6)	−1.0 (30.2)	2.4 (36.3)	5.4 (41.7)	5.6 (42.1)	7.7 (45.9)	4.4 (39.9)	−0.4 (31.3)	−3.9 (25.0)	−6.0 (21.2)	−8.1 (17.4)
Average rainfall mm (inches)	100.1 (3.94)	71.8 (2.83)	83.7 (3.30)	76.6 (3.02)	59.3 (2.33)	17.9 (0.70)	5.7 (0.22)	8.3 (0.33)	38.7 (1.52)	122.1 (4.81)	115.5 (4.55)	121.8 (4.80)	821.5 (32.35)
Average precipitation days (≥ 1 mm)	9.6	6.8	7.6	8.0	7.0	2.3	1.2	1.1	3.6	8.9	9.1	9.3	74.6
Source: Instituto de Meteorologia

== Parishes ==
Administratively, the municipality is divided into 9 civil parishes (freguesias):

- Aldeia do Bispo, Águas e Aldeia de João Pires
- Aranhas
- Benquerença
- Meimão
- Meimoa
- Pedrógão de São Pedro e Bemposta
- Penamacor
- Salvador
- Vale da Senhora da Póvoa

== Notable people ==
- António Nunes Ribeiro Sanches (1699 in Penamacor – 1783 in Paris) a Jewish physician, philosopher and encyclopédiste.
- Francisco Cunha Leal (1888 in Pedrógão – 1970) politician during the Portuguese First Republic; 84th Prime Minister of Portugal, 1921/1922.
- Joaquim Furtado (born 1948 in Penamacor) a journalist, reporter, TV anchor and documentary film director.
- António José Seguro (born 1962 in Penamacor) President of Portugal since 2026.
