= Castro Verde (civil parish) =

- Civil parish
- Location in Portugal
- Coordinates: 37.698°N 8.083°W
- Country: Portugal
- Region: Alentejo
- Intermunic. comm.: Baixo Alentejo
- District: Beja
- Municipality: Castro Verde
- Disbanded: 2013
- Elevation: 224 m (735 ft)

Population (2001)
  - Total: 3,819
- Time zone: UTC+00:00 (WET)
  - Summer (DST): UTC+01:00 (WEST)
- Postal code: 7780-217
- Area code: 286
- Patron: Nossa Senhora da Conceição
- Website: http://www.jf-castroverde.pt/

Castro Verde (Portuguese pronunciation: [ˈkaʃtɾu ˈveɾðɨ]) is a former civil parish in the municipality of Castro Verde, Portugal. In 2013, the parish merged into the new parish Castro Verde e Casével. In 2001, its resident population included 3819 inhabitants.

== History ==
Turdetani, Roman and Arab peoples left behind several markers in the lands, although its settlements were primarily the consequence of Lusitanian castros that dotted the landscape. With the arrival the Romans in the Iberian peninsula, the region of Castro Verde began to be settled by shepherds and farmers. Its toponym, Castrum Veteris, was associated with a Roman military outpost which helped to protect the small pastoral communities from the 1st century BC, and later prospectors who searched for metal ore within the White Pyrite Belt.

The Reconquista placed the region on the historical map; historical tradition holds that it was in São Pedro das Cabeças that the famous Battle of Ourique was waged by forces of Portuguese nobleman Afonso Henriques, who presumably decapitated five Moorish kings during the battle. Historically, the battle occurred on the plains of Ourique, a vast territory that included Castro Verde. In addition, the toponymic name of São Pedro das Cabeças came from legends that indicated that a number of cadavers and skulls found in these lands, from the numerous battles.

Ecclesiastically, Castro Verde was a priory of the commendatory of Saint James (Portuguese: Comenda de Santiago), who received four moios of wheat and barley, and 20,000 réis for his annual land rents. Initially, the Dukes of Aveiro were the donatary chieftains of these lands, but they were eventually integrated into the possessions of the Crown.

Castro Verde received its political and administrative autonomy through a foral issued by King Manuel I on 20 November 1510, which in itself indicated the centre's importance in the 16th century.

== Geography ==
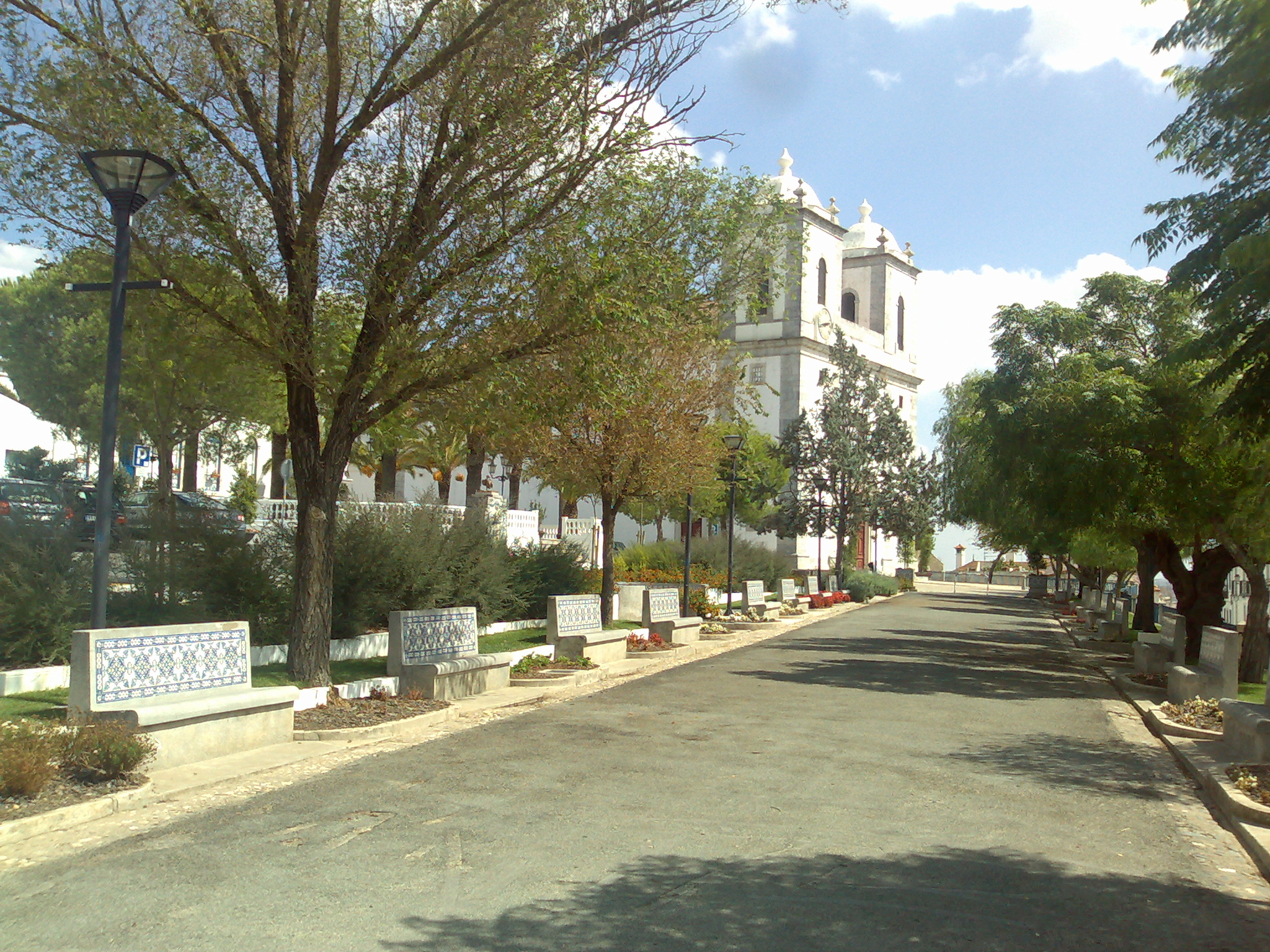
The roadway leading to the Royal Basilica of Castro Verde, named in honour of Nossa Senhora da Conceição

The parish of Castro Verde, occupies almost half of the municipality, and represents one of the more important centres of Beja, owing to its population and rich natural resources. Within an area of approximately 288.6 square kilometres (111.4 sq mi), it is the central place of region that includes several smaller localities, including: Aivados, Almeirim, Estação de Ourique, Geraldos, Monte Serro, Namorados and Piçarras. The superficial soils of this territory are generally poor, but the area's mineral wealth, particularly in the interior, has been explored since the first settlers arrived in the region.

Geographically, the parish's territory falls within one of the more important avian and bio-regions of the country, classified as a Zona de Protecção Especial (Special Protection Zone). Its steppes continue to be used by shepherds to graze their herds.

Being the municipal seat and residence of 50% of the region's population, Castro Verde is equipped with many of the essential services. With the growth of its population in recent years, the area has become more developed, including the south-lands, where new leisure space were established.

== Architecture ==
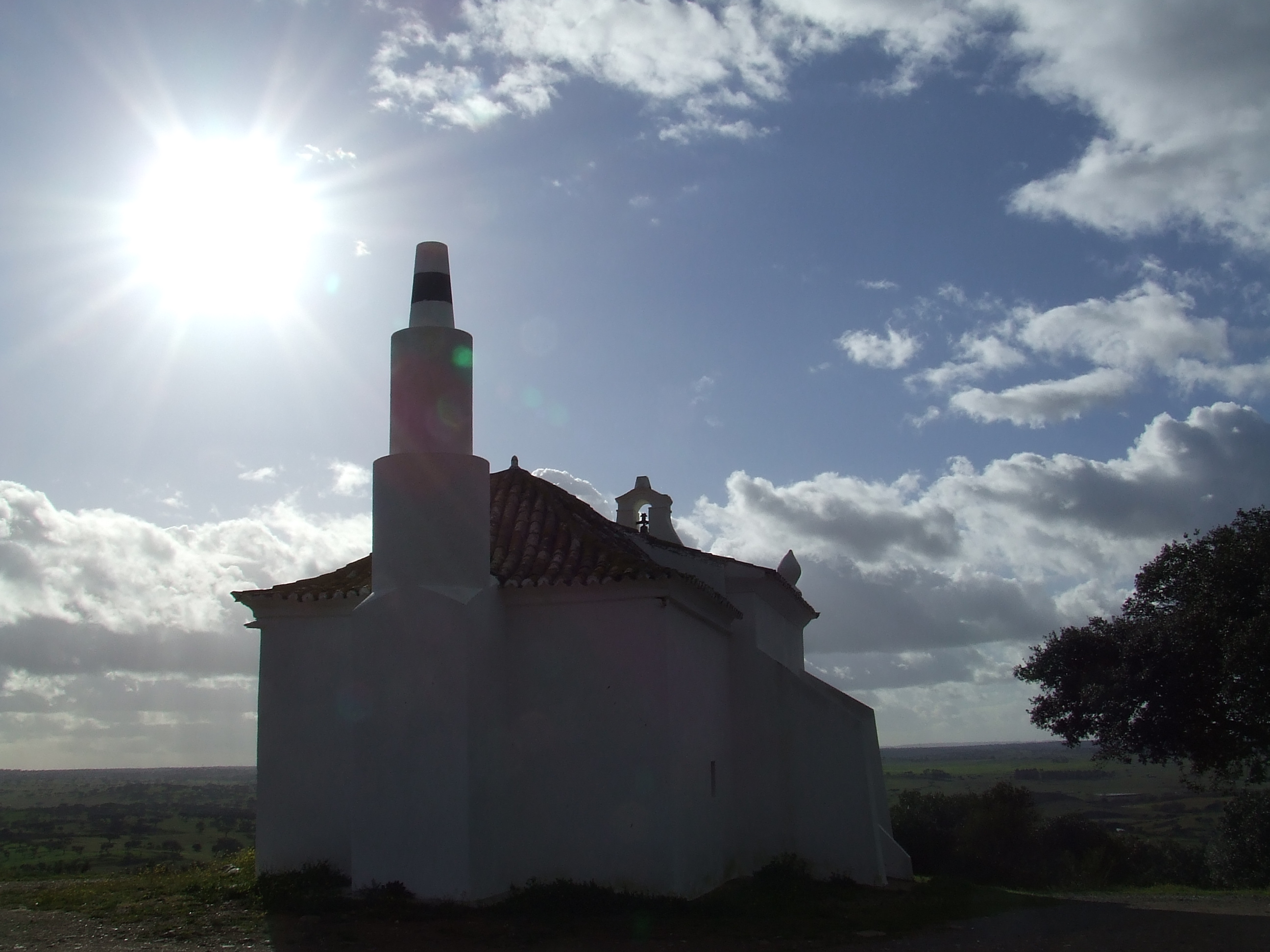
The simple profile of the Chapel of São Pedro das Cabeças, on the outskirts of Geraldos

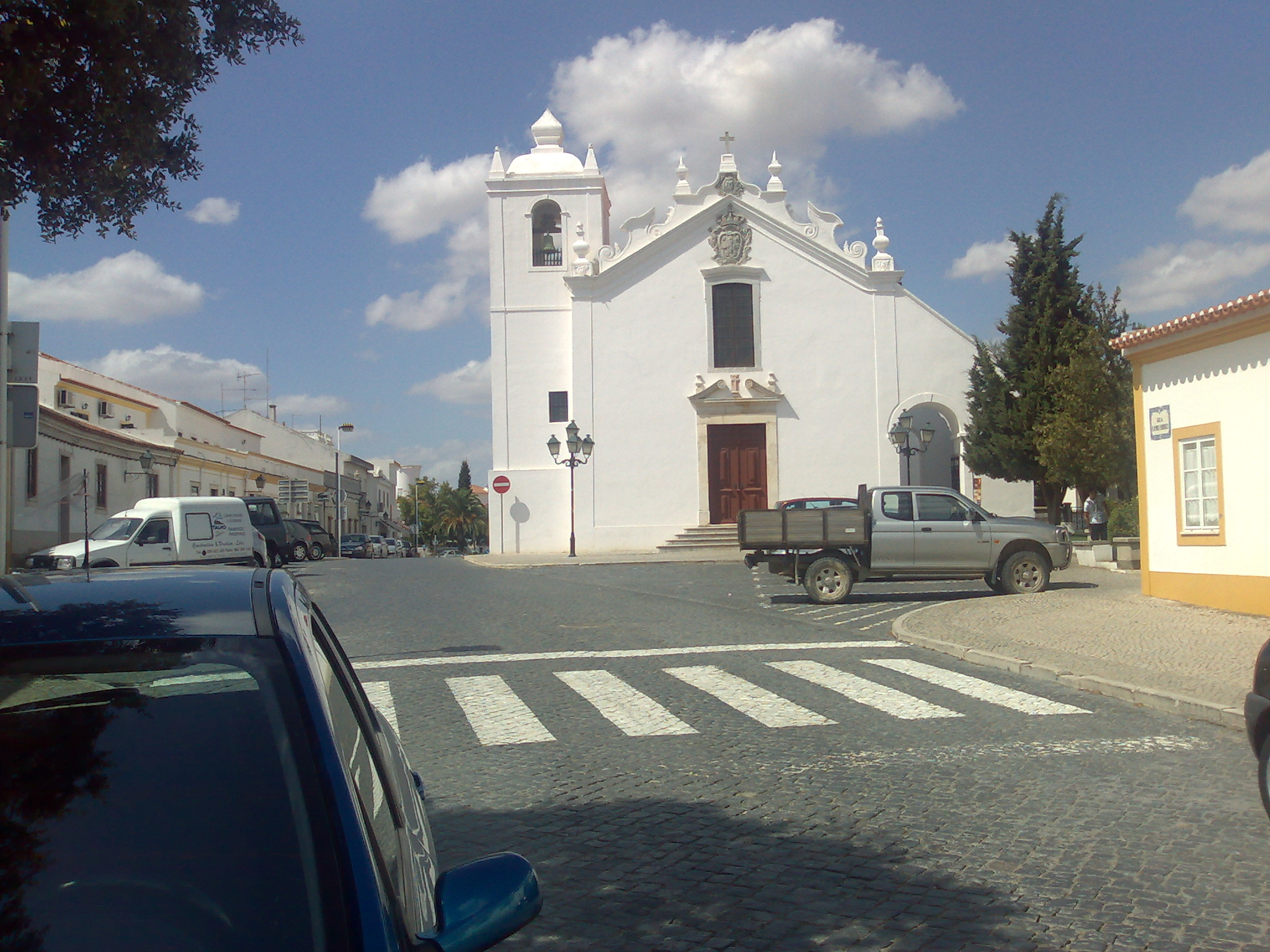
The ornate facade of the Church of Nossa Senhora dos Remédios

The architectural importance of the settlement is highlighted by the Royal Basilica built in 1713, a church whose interior is covered in polychromatic tiles, depicting the legendary Battle of Ourique, and site of the museum of the royal treasury. Near this church, at the beginning of Rua D. Afonso I, is Church of Nossa Senhora dos Remédios and the Museum of Lucerne, another centre that promotes the cultural heritage of the parish/municipality.

=== Civic ===
- Commemorative Pillory of the Battle of Ourique (Portuguese: Padrão comemorativo da Batalha de Ourique), although constructed in 1785 alongside the hermitage of São Pedro, this marker was moved to the site of the municipal council hall around 1960, just after being ruined by a lightning strike. The only surviving elements of this event were the staircase, the base and the medallion;
- Clinic of Castro Verde (Portuguese: Posto de Consulta e Socorros de Castro Verde), this mid-century building, was constructed during the 1950s by the Estado Novo regime, exemplifying of the nationalist style of design;
- Municipal Market of Castro Verde (Portuguese: Mercado Municipal), the municipal marketed was constructed by the municipal authority under the projections of architect Jorge Manuel Teixeira Viana;
- Windmill of Castro Verde(Portuguese: Moinho de vento), one of the disappearing windmills of the Alentjeo, the windmill was in disuse by 1940, but bought by the local authority and recuperated in 2003;

=== Religious ===
- Church of Nossa Senhora da Conceição
- Church of Nossa Senhora das Aracelis
- Church of Nossa Senhora dos Remédios
- Church of the Misericórdia
- Chapel of São Pedro das Cabeças (Portuguese: Ermida de São Pedro das Cabeça), 5 kilometres (3.1 mi) from Geraldos, the 15th century chapel is a rural sanctuary, and devotional site for pilgrims;
- Chapel of São Miguel - Constructed between 1715 and 1728, on the orders of King João V, over the ruins an older church, the construction was remodeled on similar orders of Queen Maria I of Portugal (1760–1779) with a revised interior of azulejos from Lisbon.
- Chapel of São Sebastião (Portuguese: Ermida de São Sebastião), the simple, single-nave chapel was also part of the "late", 17th century Manueline tradition of pilgrimage chapels, recognizable for the painted vaulted retable;
- Chapel of São Sebastião de Almeirim (Portuguese: Ermida de São Sebastião de Almeirim), a simple, vaulted nave with a painted niche, recognizable for its almost square structure;

== Culture ==
Castro Verde is known the secular festivities on the first Wednesday in October: the Fair of Castro. The biggest fair in the region, that promotes the businesses and products of the neighbouring parishes, it receives thousands of visitors. Dating back to the medieval period, it was reinforced and promoted by Philip II, who in 1620, decreed that the proceeds of the fair would be used to improve the parochial church.
