= Manuel Matias (runner) =

Portuguese long-distance runner

Personal information
- National team: Portugal
- Born: March 30, 1962 (age 64) Alfundão, Ferreira do Alentejo
- Years active: 1988 - 2010

Sport
- Country: Portugal

Achievements and titles
- Personal best: 2:08:33
Medal record
	Long-distance running
	Portugal
Gold medal – first place	1988 Paris Marathon
Gold medal – first place	1989 Fukuoka Marathon
Silver medal – second place	1991 World Marathon Cup
Gold medal – first place	1992 City-Pier-City Loop
Silver medal – second place	1992 Berlin Marathon
Gold medal – first place	1994 Seoul International Marathon
Silver medal – second place	1994 Fukuoka Marathon

Manuel Fernando Gonilho Matias (born 30 March 1962 in Alfundão, Ferreira do Alentejo) is a retired long-distance runner from Portugal, who won the 1989 edition of the Fukuoka Marathon, clocking 2:12:54 on 3 December 1989, to this day the only Portuguese runner to win at Fukuoka. A year earlier he triumphed in the Paris Marathon. Matias represented his native country at the 1996 Summer Olympics in Atlanta, Georgia, finishing in 46th place (2:20:58).

He won the City-Pier-City Loop half marathon in the Hague in 1992. For his debut in the United States, he ran in the 1995 New York City Marathon, placing 9th.

Matias set a national point record in the heptathlon of 5,186 points. It was beaten in January 2023 by Guilherme Almeida. Matias had retired in 2010.

== Achievements ==
Year	Competition	Venue	Position	Event	Notes
Representing Portugal
1988	Paris Marathon	Paris, France	1st	Marathon	2:13:53
1989	Fukuoka Marathon	Fukuoka, Japan	1st	Marathon	2:12:54
1989	London Marathon	London, England	4th	Marathon	2:09:43
1990	European Championships	Split, Yugoslavia	8th	Marathon	2:18:52
1991	World Championships	Tokyo, Japan	—	Marathon	DNF
1991	World Marathon Cup	London, England	2nd	Marathon	2:10:21
1992	City-Pier-City Loop	The Hague, Netherlands	1st	Half Marathon	1:02:04
1992	Berlin Marathon	Berlin, Germany	2nd	Marathon	2:08:38
1994	Seoul International Marathon	Seoul, South Korea	1st	Marathon	2:08:33
1994	European Championships	Helsinki, Finland	7th	Marathon	2:12:48
1994	Fukuoka Marathon	Fukuoka, Japan	2nd	Marathon	2:09:50
1995	New York City Marathon	New York City, United States	9th	Marathon	2:12:49
1996	Olympic Games	Atlanta, United States	46th	Marathon	2:20:58
