= Santa Bárbara de Padrões =

- Civil parish
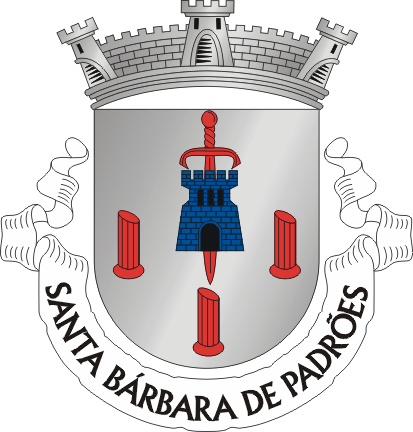
- Coat of arms

- Location in Portugal
- Coordinates: 37.637°N 7.987°W
- Country: Portugal
- Region: Alentejo
- Intermunic. comm.: Baixo Alentejo
- District: Beja
- Municipality: Castro Verde

Area
  - Total: 66.31 km^{2} (25.60 sq mi)

Population (2011)
  - Total: 943
  - Density: 14.2/km^{2} (36.8/sq mi)
- Time zone: UTC+00:00 (WET)
  - Summer (DST): UTC+01:00 (WEST)

Santa Bárbara de Padrões is a Portuguese town/parish within the boundaries of the municipality of Castro Verde. The population in 2011 was 943, in an area of 66.31 km^{2} (25.60 sq mi).

The landscape of the parish provides a more rugged terrain than the rest of the district being an area of transition between the plains of the Sierra and the White Field of the Caldeirão.

The economic life of the parish is closely linked to the subsoil wealth mined at the Neves-Corvo mine that is part of the largest Pyrite belt of Europe, the Iberian Pyrite Belt.

Mine activity in this region goes back as far as 1700 B.C, with remains of mining structures dating back to Roman times when the area played a significant role in the expansion of Roman metallurgy. This southern area of Lusitania, being a Roman province for several centuries, was an abundant source of mineral ore which included Gold, Silver, Copper, Tin, Lead and Iron.
