= 1992 Berlin Marathon =

19th Berlin Marathon
- Venue: Berlin, Germany
- Dates: 27 September 1992

Champions
- Men: David Tsebe (2:08:07)
- Women: Uta Pippig (2:25:15)

The 1992 Berlin Marathon was the 19th running of the annual marathon race held in Berlin, Germany, held on 27 September 1992. South Africa's David Tsebe won the men's race in 2:08:07 hours, while the women's race was won by home athlete Uta Pippig in 2:30:22.

== Results ==
=== Men ===
Position	Athlete	Nationality	Time
1	David Tsebe	South Africa	2:08:07
2	Manuel Matias	Portugal	2:08:38
3	Simon Karori	Kenya	2:11:50
4	Harri Hänninen	Finland	2:13:06
5	Thabiso Moqhali	Lesotho	2:13:19
6	Jose Carlos da Silva	Brazil	2:13:20
7	Carlos Patrício	Portugal	2:13:29
8	Sławomir Gurny	Poland	2:13:39
9	Kevin McCluskey	United Kingdom	2:14:04
10	Sam Nyangincha	Kenya	2:14:09

=== Women ===
Position	Athlete	Nationality	Time
1	Uta Pippig	Germany	2:30:22
2	Renata Kokowska	Poland	2:30:57
3	Anna Rybicka	Poland	2:31:56
4	Lyubov Klochko	Ukraine	2:32:13
5	Kirsi Mattila	Finland	2:32:31
6	Yekaterina Khramenkova	Belarus	2:33:26
7	Izabela Zatorska	Poland	2:33:46
8	Marie-Helene Ohier	France	2:33:53
9	Elena Nilova	Russia	2:37:40
10	Lynn Harding	United Kingdom	2:38:01
