= Odivelas, Ferreira do Alentejo =

Odivelas
- Civil parish
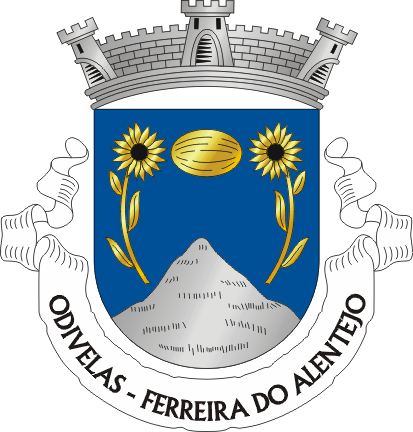
- Coat of arms

- Location in Portugal
- Coordinates: 38.168°N 8.147°W
- Country: Portugal
- Region: Alentejo
- Intermunic. comm.: Baixo Alentejo
- District: Beja
- Municipality: Ferreira do Alentejo

Area
  - Total: 110.05 km^{2} (42.49 sq mi)

Population (2011)
  - Total: 542
  - Density: 4.9/km^{2} (13/sq mi)
- Time zone: UTC+00:00 (WET)
  - Summer (DST): UTC+01:00 (WEST)

Odivelas is a freguesia in Ferreira do Alentejo, Portugal. The population in 2011 was 542, in an area of 110.05 km^{2}.
