= Peroguarda =

- Freguesia
- Location within Portugal
- Coordinates: 38°5′31″N 8°2′51″W
- Country: Portugal
- District: Beja
- Municipality: Ferreira do Alentejo

Area
  - Total: 36.36 km^{2} (14.04 sq mi)

Population (2001)
  - Total: 400
  - Density: 11/km^{2} (28/sq mi)

Peroguarda is a former civil parish in the municipality of Ferreira do Alentejo, Portugal. In 2013, the parish merged into the new parish Alfundão e Peroguarda.
