= São Marcos da Ataboeira =

- Civil parish
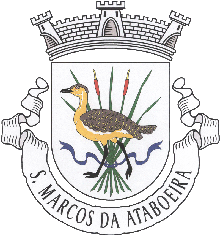
- Coat of arms

- Location in Portugal
- Coordinates: 37.708°N 7.941°W
- Country: Portugal
- Region: Alentejo
- Intermunic. comm.: Baixo Alentejo
- District: Beja
- Municipality: Castro Verde

Area
  - Total: 104.13 km^{2} (40.20 sq mi)

Population (2011)
  - Total: 338
  - Density: 3.2/km^{2} (8.4/sq mi)
- Time zone: UTC+00:00 (WET)
  - Summer (DST): UTC+01:00 (WEST)

São Marcos da Ataboeira is a Portuguese town/parish in the municipality of Castro Verde. The population in 2011 was 338, in an area of 104.13 km^{2}. The village was integrated into the municipality of Castro Verde during the nineteenth century, and is situated 13 km north east from the municipal seat.

It is a territory where the pseudo-steppe is predominant, and grazing has an important role in preserving the traditional landscape. The area of the parish belongs to the SPA - Special Protection Area, for endangered species of steppe birds such as the great bustard and lesser kestrel. The SPA makes part of the Natura 2000 project of the European Union.

A few kilometres from the nearby town of Salto sits the chapel of 'Our Lady of Aracelis', a place of pilgrimage and festivities during the first weekend of September.

== Photos ==
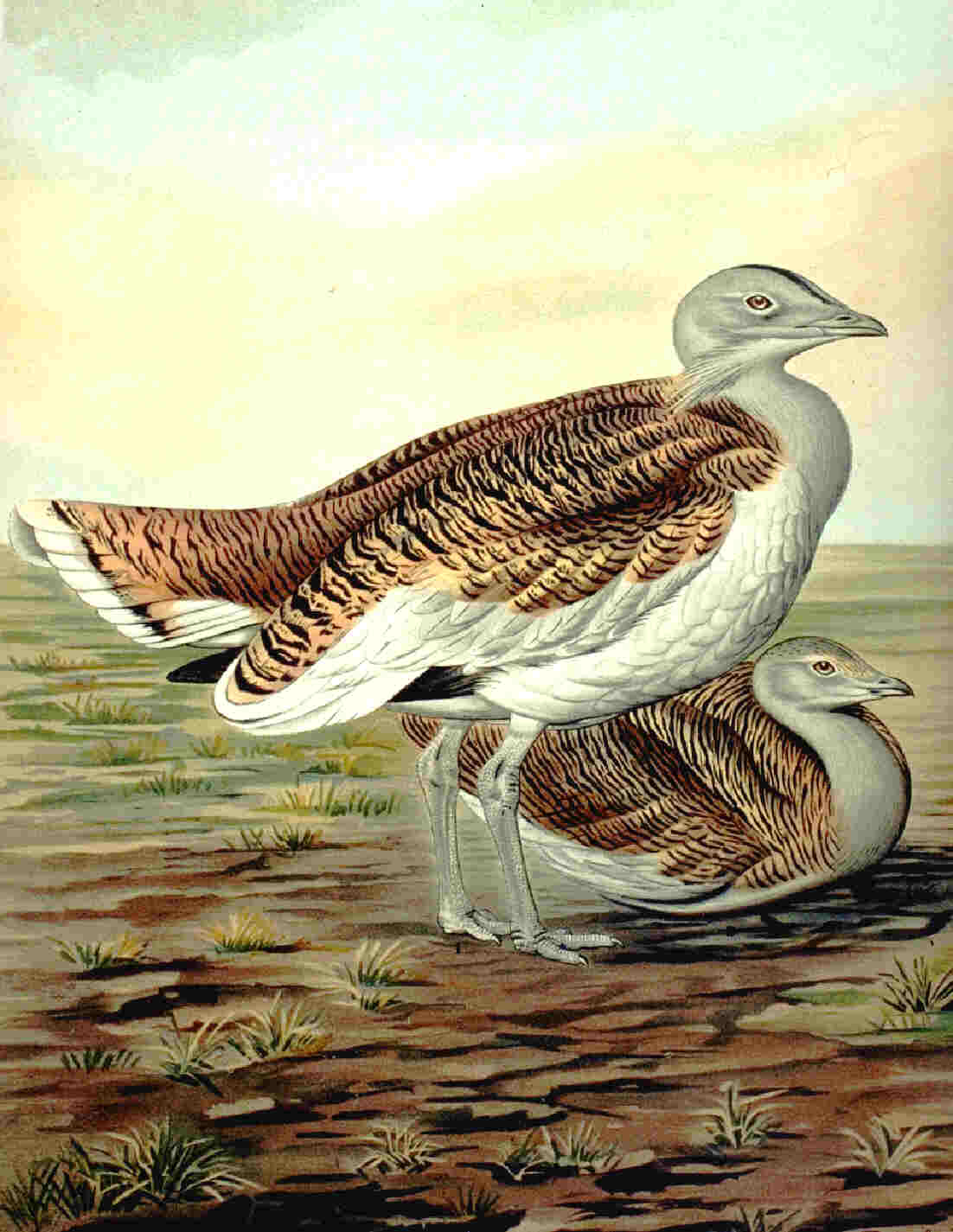
Great bustard

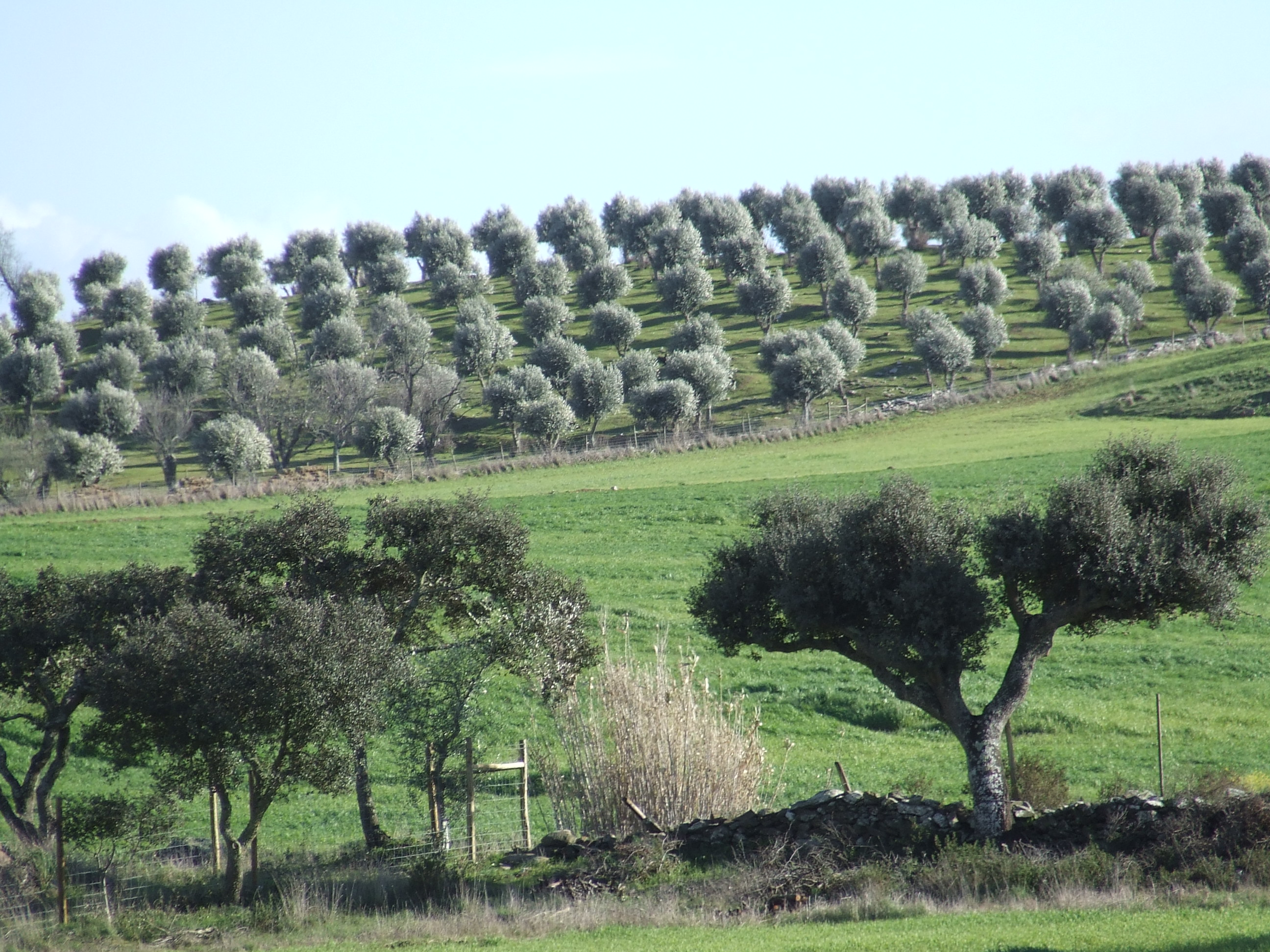
Holm oaks and olive trees

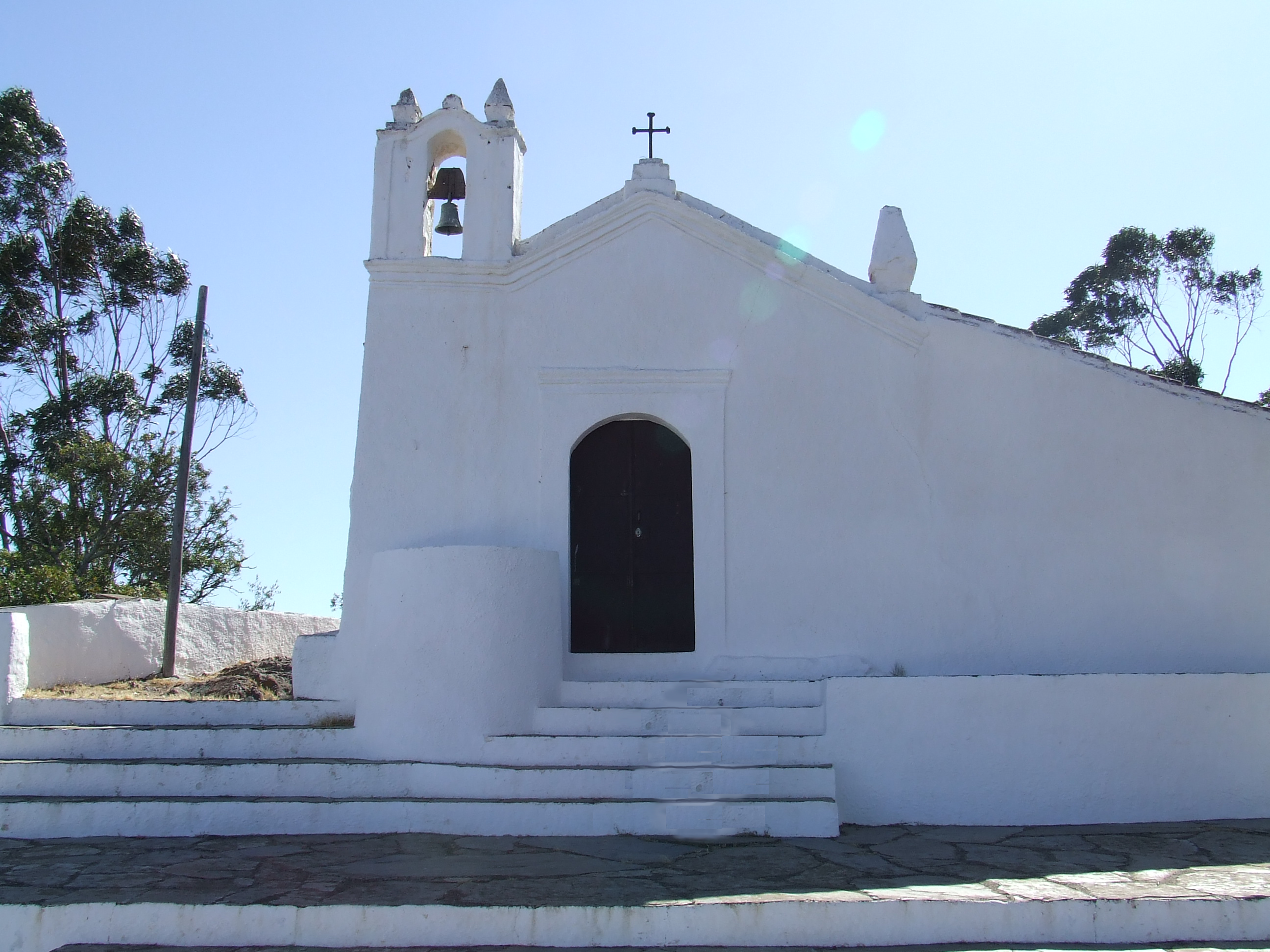
Chapel of Aracelis
