= Casével =

- Civil Parish
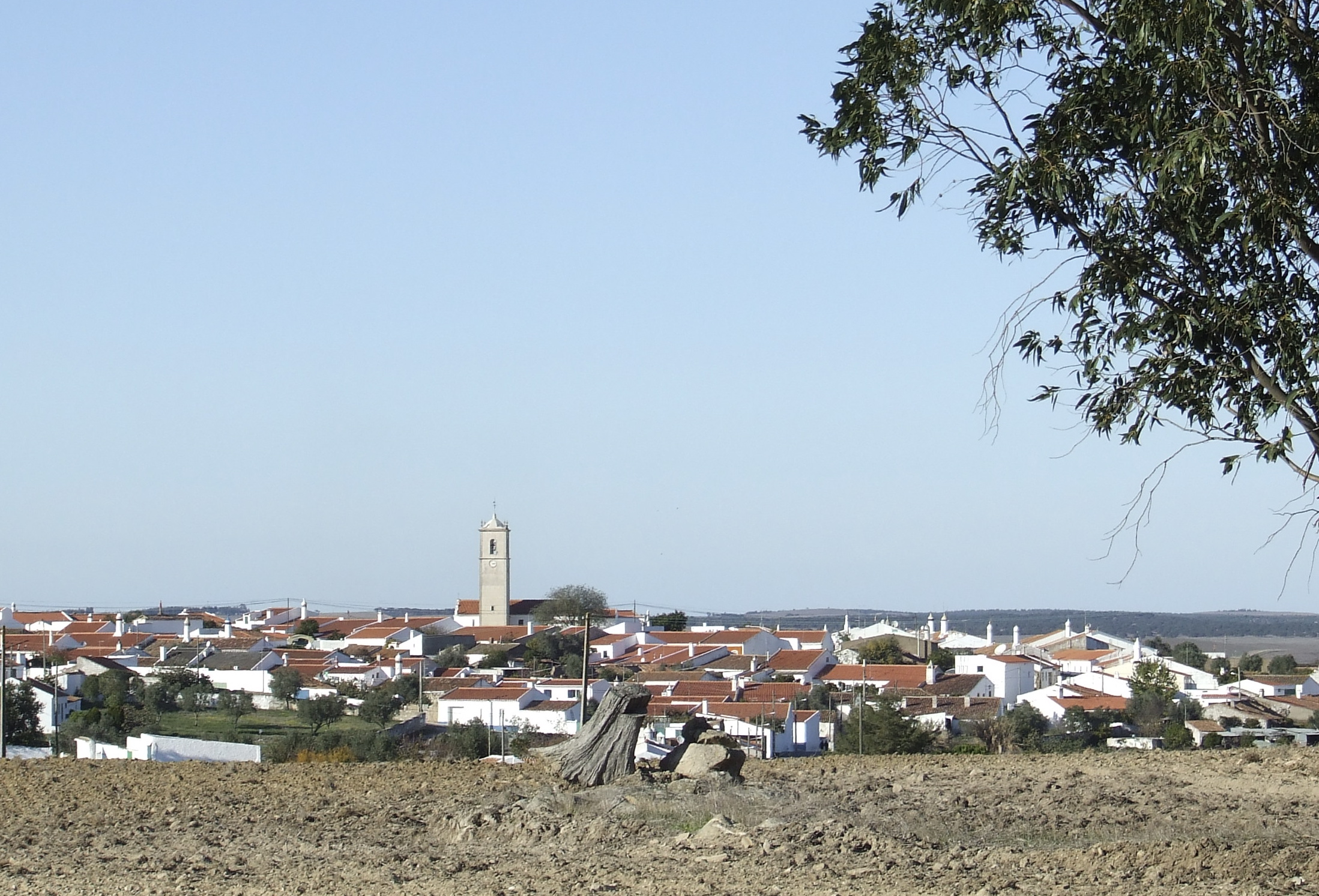
- The village of Casével, as seen from the promontory into the town, with its Baroque-style Matriz Church

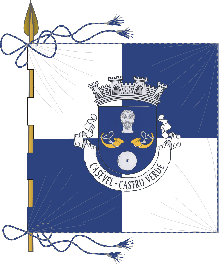
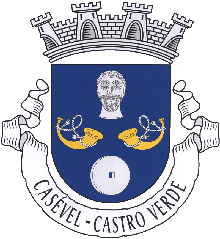
- Flag Coat of arms

- Location of the civil parish of Casével in the municipality of Castro Verde
- Coordinates: 37°45′25″N 8°10′57″W
- Country: Portugal
- Region: Alentejo
- Subregion: Baixo Alentejo
- District: Beja
- Municipality: Castro Verde
- Settlement: fl. 1500
- Parish: 20 September 1510
- Civil Parish: 24 October 1855
- Localities: Aivados, Casével, Estação de Ourique

Area
  - Total: 33.73 km^{2} (13.02 sq mi)
- Elevation: 200 m (660 ft)

Population (2011)
  - Total: 447
  - Density: 13.3/km^{2} (34.3/sq mi)
- Time zone: UTC0 (WET)
  - Summer (DST): UTC+1 (WEST)
- Postal Zone: 7780–020
- Area code: (+351) 286 XX XX XX
- Demonym: Caséveis
- Patron Saint: São João Baptista
- Geographic detail from CAOP (2010) produced by Instituto Geográfico Português (IGP)

Casével is a former civil parish in the municipality of Castro Verde, Portugal. In 2013, the parish merged into the new parish Castro Verde e Casével. It is located 10 kilometres north-west of the municipal seat. It was considered the civil parish with the smallest population (365 inhabitants in 2001) in the municipality, covering an area of approximately 33.3 km².

== History ==
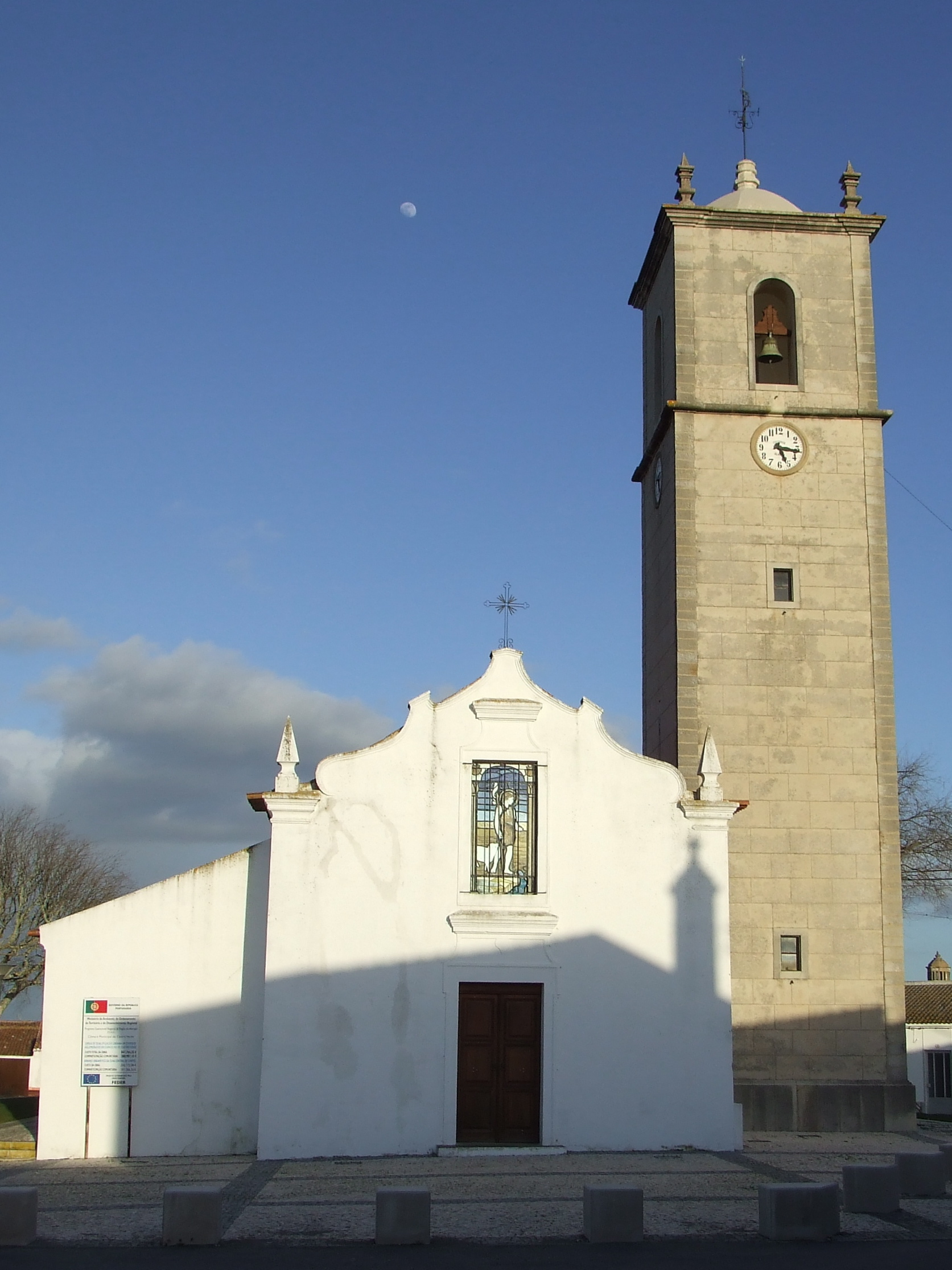
Front façade of the Matriz Church of Casével, located in the center of the village

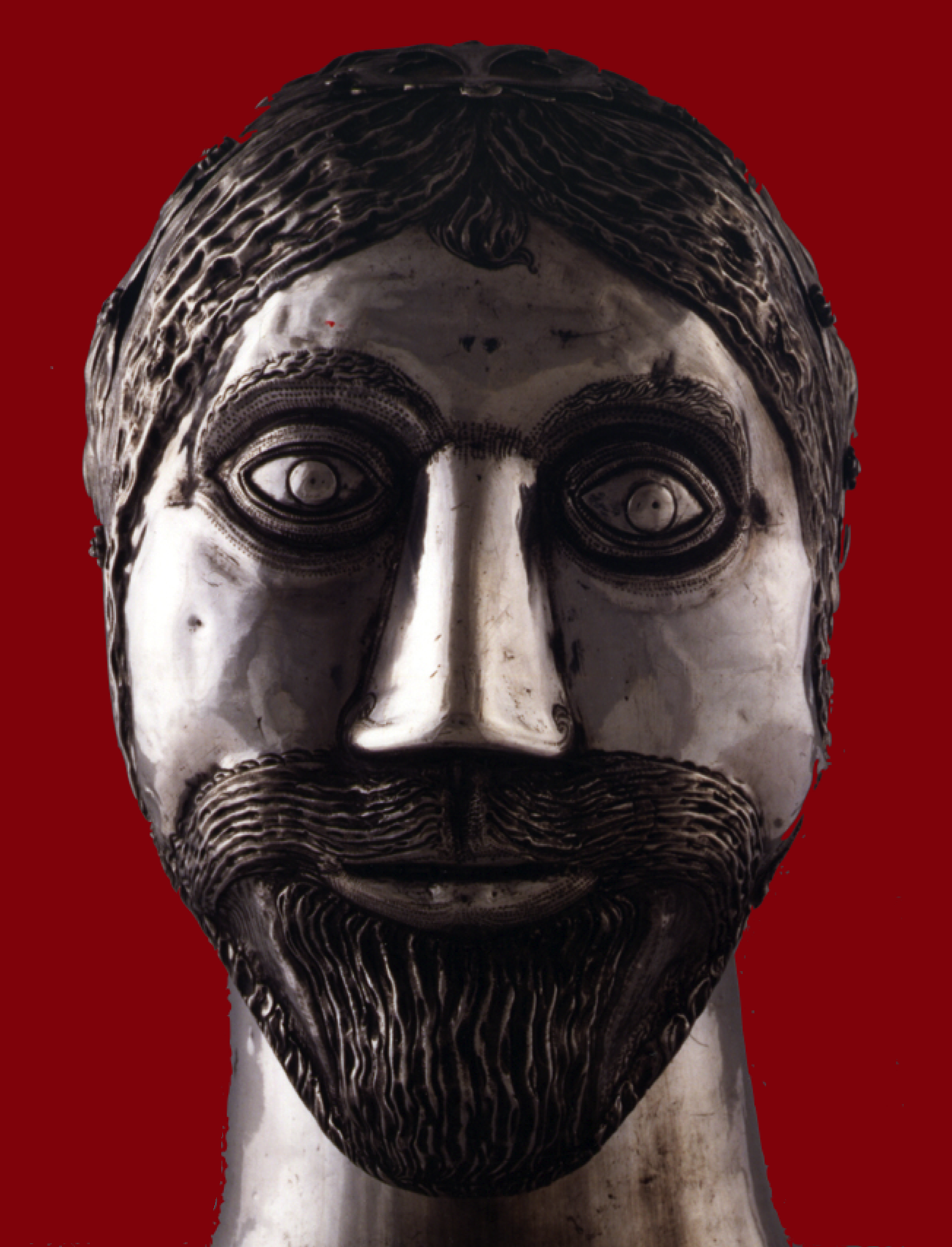
Reliquary-Head of Saint Fabian, unearthed during restoration of the parochial church

The town received its Charter by order of King Manuel I of Portugal on the 20 September 1510 and was the municipal seat until 1836, when it was incorporated into the municipality of Messejana (the seat of the former Knights of Santiago).

Casével's only church, to the invocation of São João Baptista dates back to the 14th century, and was repaired several times, including in 1533 and again in 1940-1950 after it had been abandoned. During the course of its restoration, layers of debris were removed to reveal a gold-leaf altar, with various saints of which little is known, and golden silver ornaments, including the Reliquary-Head of Saint Fabian and two monstrance, dating back to the 16th century. The Head, fabricated from the 13th century, is a unique item: it is a sculpture in silver, containing the human skull of Pope Fabian, a Christian martyr. Legend has it that this relic arrived in Portugal in the possession of Princess Vataça Lascaris, and today is (and on exhibition at the Royal Treasury in the Basilica of Castro Verde).

On 24 October 1855 it was incorporated into the municipality of Castro Verde.

== Geography ==
Located in the northwest corner of the municipality, the parish is bisected by two motorways: the E1 Motorway (Auto-Estrada do Sul) that bisects the territory between the village of Casével and Aivados (connecting the main centre of Setúbal with Faro); and the secondary IC1 Motorway, in the western corner of the parish, that runs through the municipality of Ourique (intersecting two kilometres of Casével). There are no exits off of the E1, although secondary roads do link the IC1 to all the settlements in the parish.

It is surrounded by the parishes of Ourique, Panóis and Conceição (to the west) in the municipality of Ourique; Aljustrel and Messejana (to the north) in the municipality of Aljustrel Municipality; and the parish of Castro Verde (to the east and south). In addition, the northern limit of the civil parish is marked by a rail-line that slices the northern frontier on a diagonal trajectory (northeast to southwest) from Carregueiro (in Aljustrel) into Panois.

There are only three settlements in this parish, two of which are equidistant from the E1 motorway (Aviados and Casével) and the other (Estação de Ourique) which is a railway terminus and rural agglomeration. The remainder of the parish is divided into agricultural parcels/pastureland occasionally broken-up by farms or derelict buildings. The largest (and parish seat) is the village of Casével, its centre located two kilometres from the E1.

== Economy ==
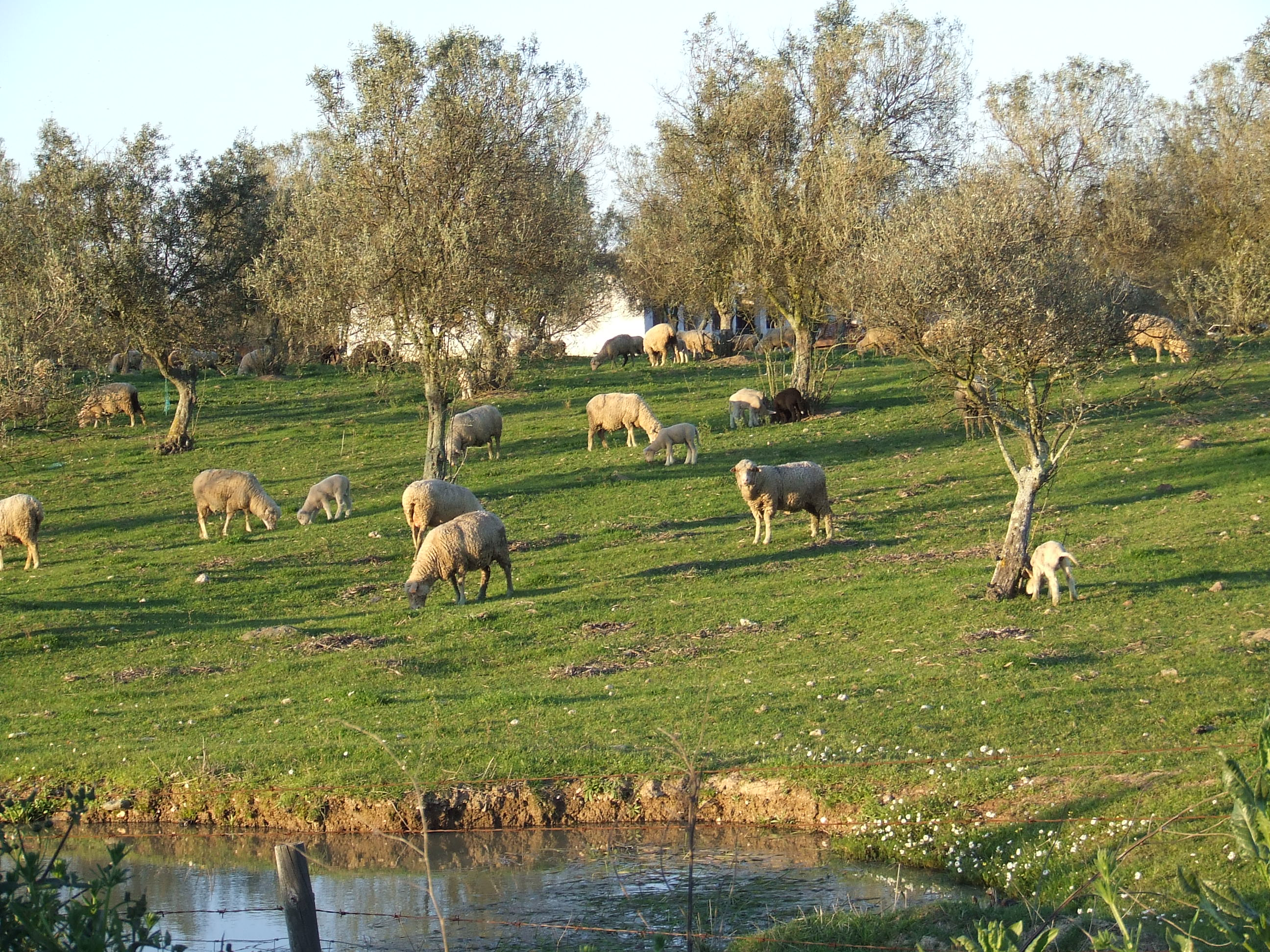
The countryside of Casével, showing grazing sheep: agriculture is the primary resource industries in the region

The principal activities in the village are related to agriculture and animal husbandry, in addition to small commercial and industrial sectors associated with milling, electricians and saw-milling.

== Architecture ==
- Church of São João Baptista (Portuguese: Igreja Matriz de São João Baptista), based on a 14th-century chapel dedicated to John the Baptist, the principal church of Casével was re-built in the Mannerist-/Baroque-style in the 16th century, with the tower being constructed during the middle of the 20th century. Although a process to qualify the structure as a designated heritage site was petitioned (24 April 1985) by the municipal authority, the process was closed in on 24 January 2009, "for not having national value".

== Culture ==
The village of Casével is home to acclaimed coral groups which have a long history of cultural importance within the municipality of Castro Verde. The Associação de Cante Alentejano: Vozes das Terras Brancas is the central body that promotes various groups of traditional canto singers, including Vozes de Casével and Antigas Mondadeiras, and its installations are open to the public (in the main square), allowing visitors to listen and appreciate the traditional ethnography and food of the parish.

== Notable citizens ==
- Alfredo Luís da Costa (24 November 1883 - Lisbon; 1 February 1908), was a Portuguese publicist, salesman, a Mason and member of the Portuguese Carbonária, best remembered for being one of the two gunmen (along with Manuel Buíça) who assassinated King Carlos I of Portugal and the Prince Royal, Luis Filipe, during the 1908 Lisbon Regicide.
