= Canhestros =

- Freguesia
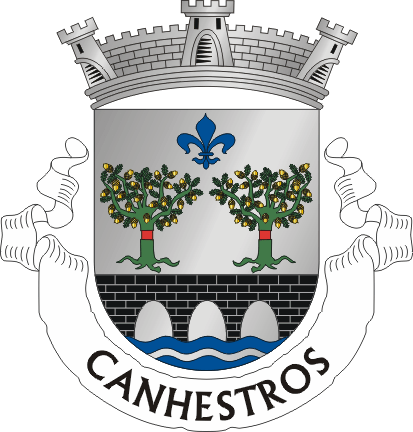
- Coat of arms

- Location within Portugal
- Coordinates: 38°2′7″N 8°17′14″W
- Country: Portugal
- District: Beja
- Municipality: Ferreira do Alentejo

Area
  - Total: 60.33 km^{2} (23.29 sq mi)

Population (2001)
  - Total: 541
  - Density: 8.97/km^{2} (23.2/sq mi)

Canhestros is a former civil parish in the municipality of Ferreira do Alentejo, Portugal. In 2013, the parish merged into the new parish Ferreira do Alentejo e Canhestros.
