= Alfundão e Peroguarda =

- Civil parish
- Location in Portugal
- Coordinates: 38.119°N 8.063°W
- Country: Portugal
- Region: Alentejo
- Intermunic. comm.: Baixo Alentejo
- District: Beja
- Municipality: Ferreira do Alentejo

Area
  - Total: 88.33 km^{2} (34.10 sq mi)

Population (2011)
  - Total: 1,227
  - Density: 14/km^{2} (36/sq mi)
- Time zone: UTC+00:00 (WET)
  - Summer (DST): UTC+01:00 (WEST)

Alfundão e Peroguarda is a civil parish in the municipality of Ferreira do Alentejo, Portugal. It was formed in 2013 by the merger of the former parishes Alfundão and Peroguarda. The population in 2011 was 1,227, in an area of 88.33 km^{2}.
