= Ferreira do Alentejo (freguesia) =

- Freguesia
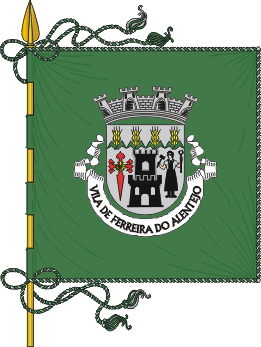
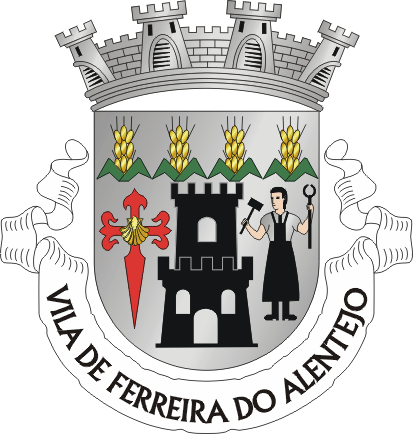
- Flag Coat of arms

- Location within Portugal
- Coordinates: 38°3′30″N 8°6′59″W
- Country: Portugal
- District: Beja
- Municipality: Ferreira do Alentejo

Area
  - Total: 226.12 km^{2} (87.31 sq mi)

Population (2001)
  - Total: 4,866
  - Density: 21.52/km^{2} (55.74/sq mi)

Ferreira do Alentejo is a former civil parish in the municipality of Ferreira do Alentejo, Portugal. In 2013, the parish merged into the new parish Ferreira do Alentejo e Canhestros.
