= Figueira dos Cavaleiros =

- Civil parish
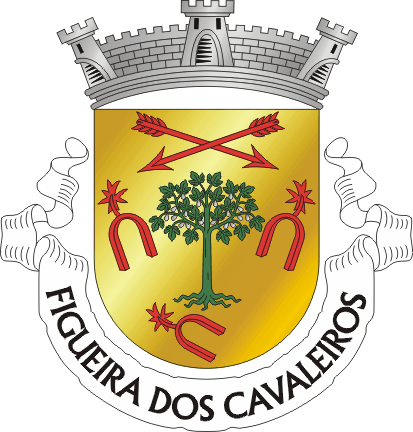
- Coat of arms

- Location in Portugal
- Coordinates: 38.094°N 8.208°W
- Country: Portugal
- Region: Alentejo
- Intermunic. comm.: Baixo Alentejo
- District: Beja
- Municipality: Ferreira do Alentejo

Area
  - Total: 154.20 km^{2} (59.54 sq mi)

Population (2011)
  - Total: 1,346
  - Density: 8.7/km^{2} (23/sq mi)
- Time zone: UTC+00:00 (WET)
  - Summer (DST): UTC+01:00 (WEST)

Figueira dos Cavaleiros is a freguesia in Ferreira do Alentejo, Portugal. The population in 2011 was 1,346, in an area of 154.20 km^{2}.
