= Entrada =

Entrada is a Spanish or Portuguese word meaning entry and may refer to:

- Entrada Sandstone, a geological formation spread across Wyoming, Colorado, New Mexico, Arizona and Utah
- Entradas, a town in Castro Verde, Portugal
- La Entrada, a town in Honduras
- La Entrada al Pacífico, a trade corridor between Mexico and the United States
- "Entrada" (Fringe), an episode of the television series Fringe
- Entrada Travel Group, New Zealand travel company
