= Ferreira do Alentejo e Canhestros =

- Civil parish
- Location in Portugal
- Coordinates: 38.059°N 8.117°W
- Country: Portugal
- Region: Alentejo
- Intermunic. comm.: Baixo Alentejo
- District: Beja
- Municipality: Ferreira do Alentejo

Area
  - Total: 295.66 km^{2} (114.15 sq mi)

Population (2011)
  - Total: 5,140
  - Density: 17/km^{2} (45/sq mi)
- Time zone: UTC+00:00 (WET)
  - Summer (DST): UTC+01:00 (WEST)

Ferreira do Alentejo e Canhestros is a civil parish in the municipality of Ferreira do Alentejo, Portugal. It was formed in 2013 by the merger of the former parishes Ferreira do Alentejo and Canhestros.

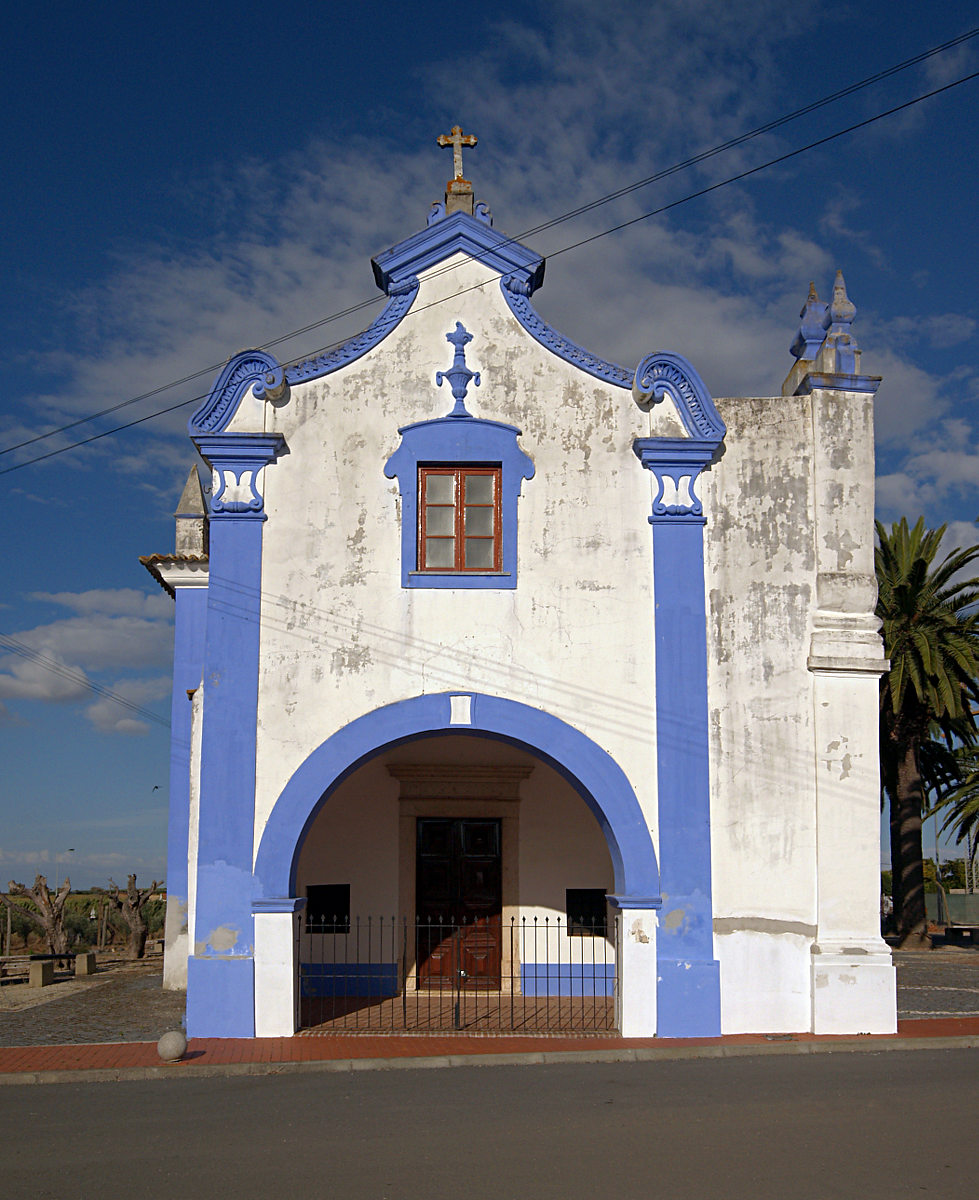
Church of Nossa Senhora da Conceição, Ferreira do Alentejo

The population in 2011 was 5,140, in an area of 295.66 km^{2}.
