= Castro Verde e Casével =

- Civil parish
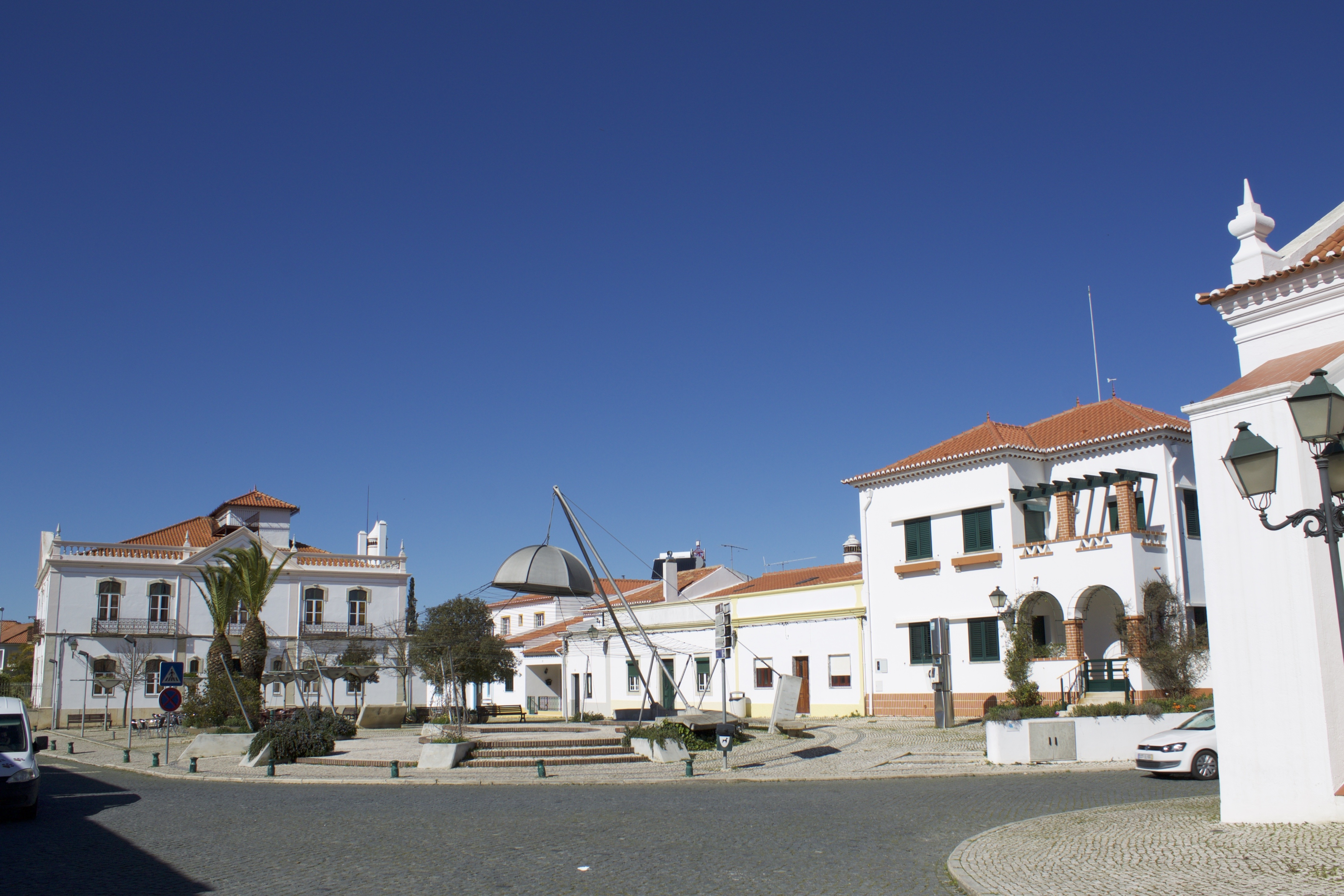

- Location in Portugal
- Coordinates: 37.698°N 8.083°W
- Country: Portugal
- Region: Alentejo
- Intermunic. comm.: Baixo Alentejo
- District: Beja
- Municipality: Castro Verde

Area
  - Total: 322.77 km^{2} (124.62 sq mi)

Population (2011)
  - Total: 5,346
  - Density: 16.56/km^{2} (42.90/sq mi)
- Time zone: UTC+00:00 (WET)
  - Summer (DST): UTC+01:00 (WEST)

Castro Verde e Casével is a civil parish in the municipality of Castro Verde, Portugal. It was formed in 2013 by the merger of the former parishes Castro Verde and Casével. The population in 2011 was 5,346, in an area of 322.77 km^{2}.
