= Alfundão =

- Civil parish
- Location in Portugal
- Coordinates: 38°7′10″N 8°3′44″W
- Country: Portugal
- Region: Alentejo
- Intermunic. comm.: Baixo Alentejo
- District: Beja
- Municipality: Ferreira do Alentejo

Area
  - Total: 51.90 km^{2} (20.04 sq mi)

Population (2001)
  - Total: 998
  - Density: 19/km^{2} (50/sq mi)
- Time zone: UTC+00:00 (WET)
  - Summer (DST): UTC+01:00 (WEST)
- Postal code: 7900
- Website: www.alfundao.freguesias.pt

Alfundão is a former civil parish in the municipality of Ferreira do Alentejo, Portugal. In 2013, the parish merged into the new parish Alfundão e Peroguarda.

Alfundão has an area of 51.96 km^{2} and 863 inhabitants (2011). Its population density was 16.6 inhab / km^{2}. At the eastern end of Ferreira do Alentejo, Alfundão delimits this municipality from those of Cuba and Beja.

It was the seat of an extinct parish in 2013, as part of a national administrative reform, to form, together with Peroguarda, a new parish called União das Freguesia de Alfundão and Peroguarda of which it is the headquarters.
