= 1995 New York City Marathon =

Footrace held in New York City

26th New York City Marathon
- Venue: New York City, New York
- Date: November 12

Champions
- Men: Germán Silva (2:11:00)
- Women: Tegla Loroupe (2:28:06)

The 1995 New York City Marathon was the 26th running of the annual marathon race in New York City, New York, which took place on Sunday, November 12. The men's elite race was won by Mexico's Germán Silva in a time of 2:11:00 hours while the women's race was won by Kenya's Tegla Loroupe in 2:28:06.

A total of 26,754 runners finished the race, 20,284 men and 6470 women.

== Results ==
=== Men ===
Position	Athlete	Nationality	Time
1st place, gold medalist(s)	Germán Silva	Mexico	2:11:00
2nd place, silver medalist(s)	Paul Evans	United Kingdom	2:11:05
3rd place, bronze medalist(s)	William Koech	Kenya	2:11:19
4	Simon Lopuyet	Kenya	2:11:38
5	John Kagwe	Kenya	2:11:42
6	Isaac García	Mexico	2:11:43
7	Joaquim Pinheiro	Portugal	2:12:19
8	Thabiso Moqhali	Lesotho	2:12:32
9	Manuel Matias	Portugal	2:12:49
10	Salvador García	Mexico	2:12:57
11	Gert Thys	South Africa	2:13:28
12	Antoni Peña	Spain	2:13:39
13	Risto Ulmala	Finland	2:13:58
14	Eric Kimaiyo	Kenya	2:14:01
15	Jackson Kabiga	Kenya	2:14:11
16	Patrick Muturi	Kenya	2:14:27
17	Jorge Marquez	Mexico	2:15:46
18	Lameck Aguta	Kenya	2:15:46
19	André Luiz Ramos	Brazil	2:15:50
20	Pascal Blanchard	France	2:16:06
—	Paul Pilkington	United States	DNF
—	Vanderlei de Lima	Brazil	DNF
—	Josia Thugwane	South Africa	DNF

=== Women ===
Position	Athlete	Nationality	Time
1st place, gold medalist(s)	Tegla Loroupe	Kenya	2:28:06
2nd place, silver medalist(s)	Manuela Machado	Portugal	2:30:37
3rd place, bronze medalist(s)	Lieve Slegers	Belgium	2:32:08
4	Joyce Chepchumba	Kenya	2:33:51
5	Griselda González	Argentina	2:34:54
6	Claudia Lokar	Germany	2:36:16
7	Roseli Machado	Brazil	2:36:18
8	Lidia Șimon	Romania	2:37:39
9	Madina Biktagirova	Belarus	2:37:46
10	Flora Venegas	Chile	2:39:33
11	Maria-Claudia Menconi	Italy	2:42:58
12	Tuija Toivonen	Finland	2:43:44
13	Alina Gherasim	Romania	2:44:12
14	Colleen De Reuck	South Africa	2:46:18
15	Zofia Wieciorkowska	Poland	2:47:43
16	Carol Galea	Malta	2:47:56
17	Gillian Horovitz	United Kingdom	2:48:17
18	Marisol Vargas	Mexico	2:48:28
19	Regina Ronan	United States	2:48:34
20	Diana Fitzpatrick	United States	2:48:44
—	Olga Appell	United States	DNF
