= Entradas =

- Civil parish
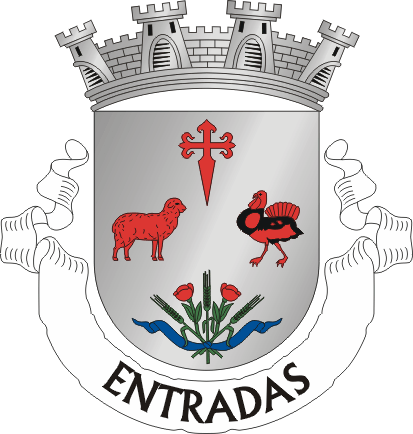
- Coat of arms

- Location in Portugal
- Coordinates: 37.776°N 8.014°W
- Country: Portugal
- Region: Alentejo
- Intermunic. comm.: Baixo Alentejo
- District: Beja
- Municipality: Castro Verde

Area
  - Total: 76.23 km^{2} (29.43 sq mi)

Population (2011)
  - Total: 649
  - Density: 8.51/km^{2} (22.1/sq mi)
- Time zone: UTC+00:00 (WET)
  - Summer (DST): UTC+01:00 (WEST)

Entradas is a Portuguese town/parish within the boundaries of the municipality of Castro Verde, in the southern Alentejo region. The population in 2011 was 649, in an area of 76.23 km^{2} (29.43 sq mi).

It received its town charter from Manuel I of Portugal in 1510, and was the county seat until 1836, when it was integrated into the municipality of Castro Verde. Historically, this area has been of a major strategic role by being the old route which linked the river port of Mértola to the interior of the lower Alentejo, and also because it was the "entrance" of the Campo Braco (White Field), the grazing territory of destination for large herds of cattle and sheep from the 14th to the 17th centuries, in particular, herds of belonging to the 'Royal House'.

Features of the surrounding countryside include cork oak trees, olive trees, wheat fields and cattle pasture, which together present a reasonable summary of the community's principal sources of income.

The town holds its annual town festival, 'Festas de Santiago' on the last weekend of July.
