= Castro Verde =

- Municipality
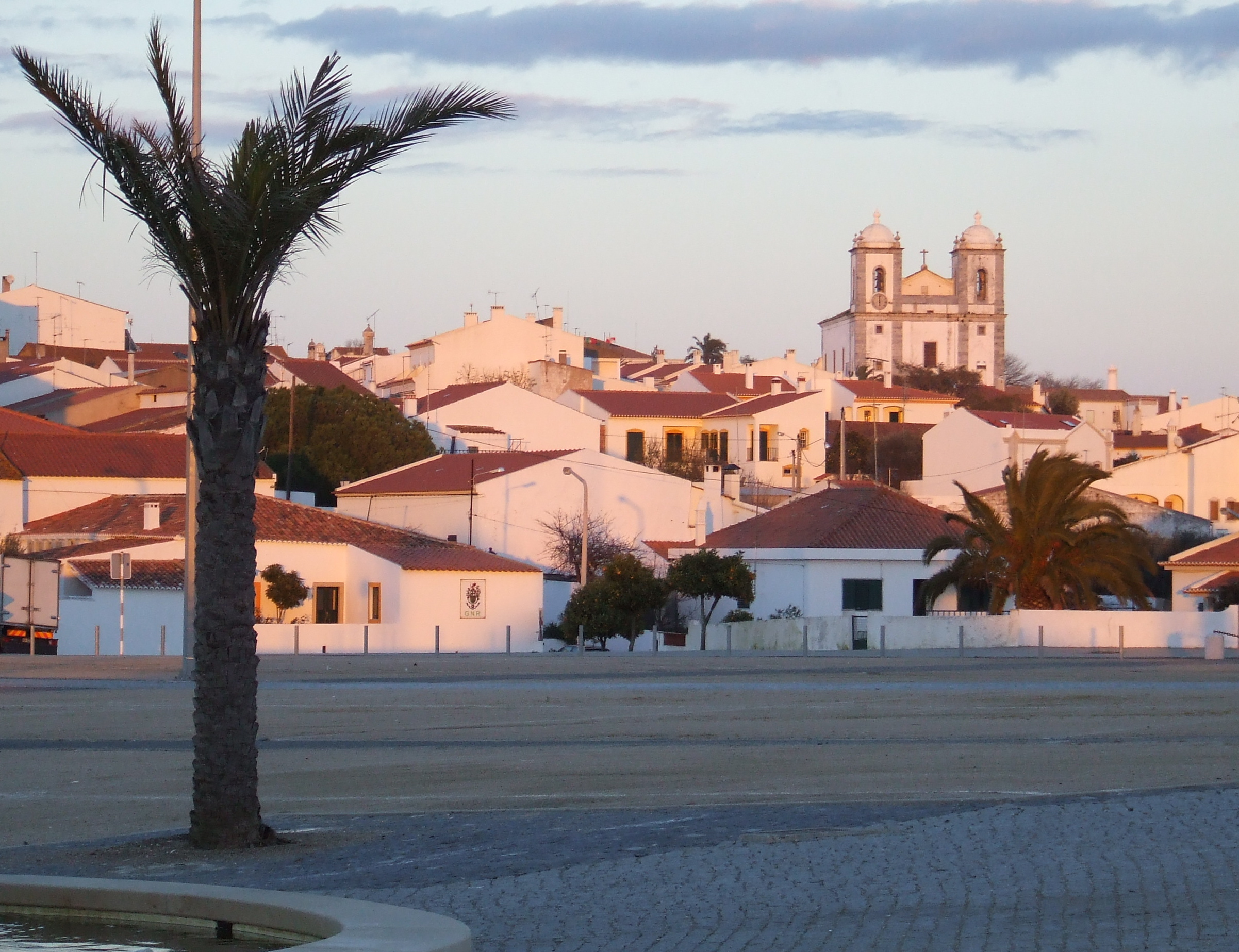
- View of Castro Verde

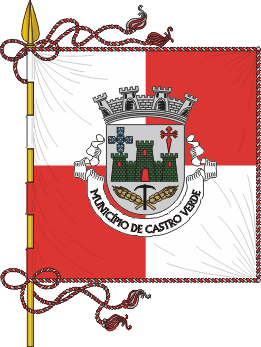
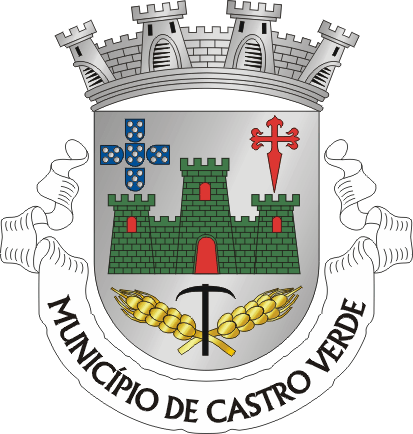
- Flag Coat of arms
- Interactive map of Castro Verde
- Location in Portugal
- Coordinates: 37°42′15″N 8°1′23″W
- Country: Portugal
- Region: Alentejo
- Intermunic. comm.: Baixo Alentejo
- District: Beja
- Parishes: 4

Government
  - President: Francisco José Caldeira Duarte (CDU)

Area
  - Total: 569.44 km^{2} (219.86 sq mi)
- Elevation: 234 m (768 ft)

Population (2011)
  - Total: 7,276
  - Density: 12.78/km^{2} (33.09/sq mi)
- Time zone: UTC+00:00 (WET)
  - Summer (DST): UTC+01:00 (WEST)
- Postal code: 7780
- Area code: 286
- Patron: São Pedro
- Website: www.cm-castroverde.pt

Castro Verde (European Portuguese pronunciation: [ˈkaʃtɾu ˈveɾðɨ]) is a municipality of the Alentejo region of Portugal (in the historic district of Beja). The population in 2011 was 7,276, in an area of 569.44 km^{2}. Castro Verde is situated in the Baixo Alentejo subregion, within a territory known locally as the Campo Branco (English: White Plains). The municipality can be recognized by the local municipal markers along its borders, that appear within its borders to denote its reference as A Window on the Plains; municipal markers appear as stylized house profiles, with an exaggerated window that allows the visitor to see through into the panorama.

== History ==
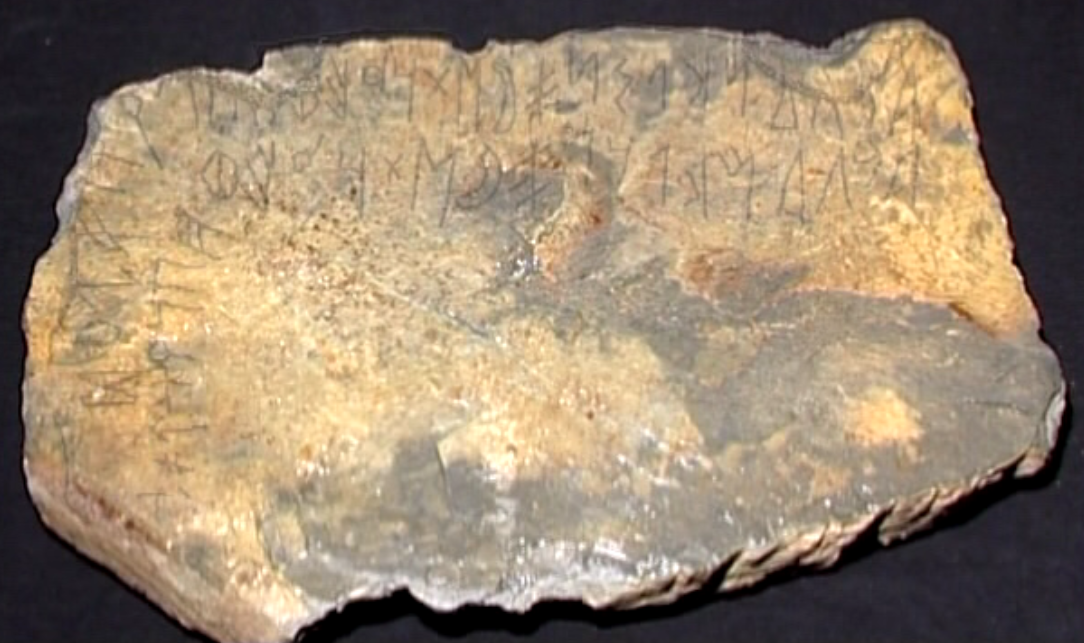
Syllabary of Espança, an ancient stone with evidence of Phoenician influences in the region

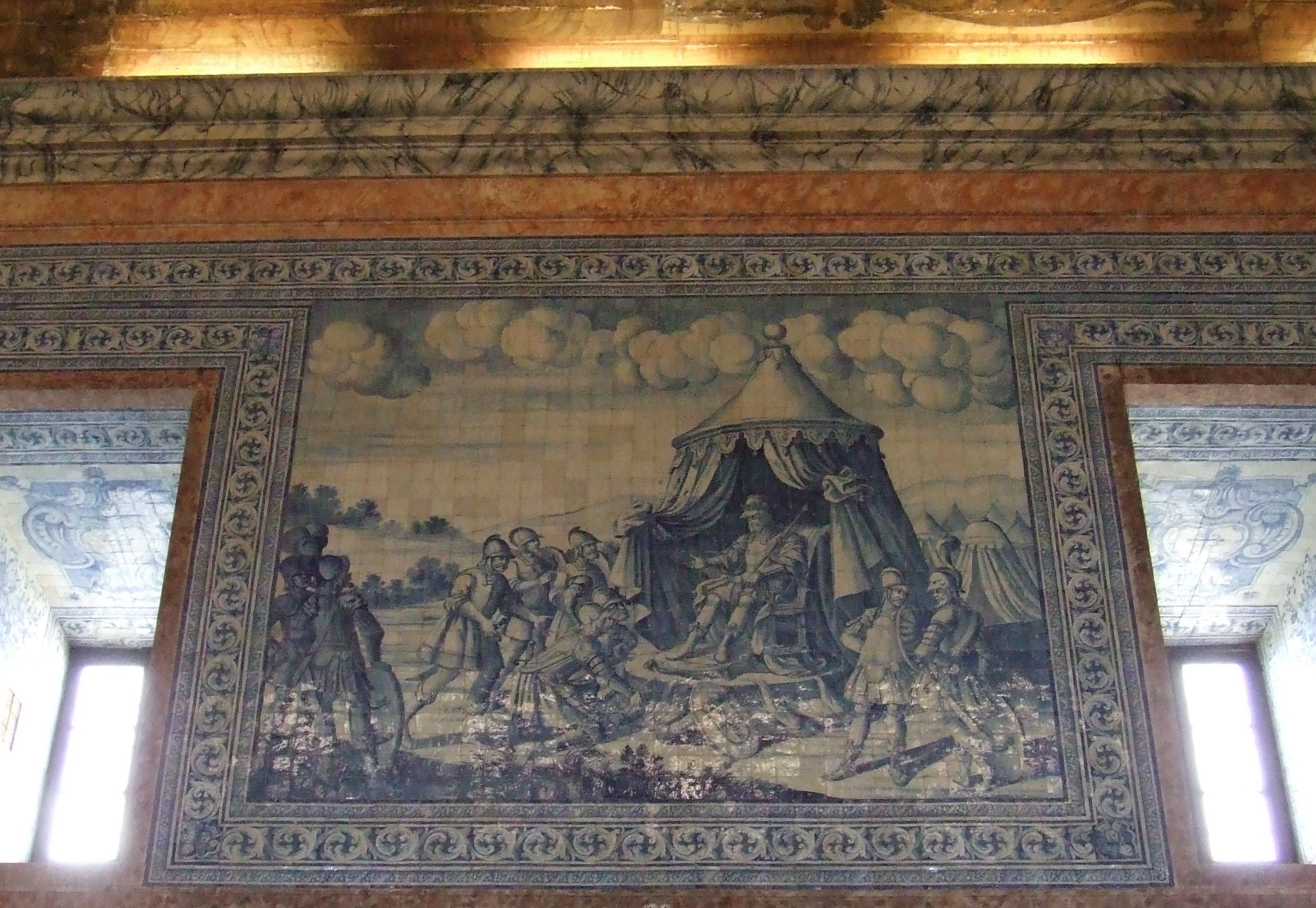
'D. Afonso Henriques', azulejo of the monarch in the Royal Basilica of Castro Verde dedicated to the Battle of Orique

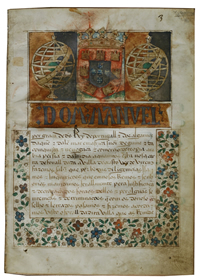
The 1510 Charter of the town of Castro Verde promulgated by Manuel I of Portugal

The pre-History of the Baixo Alentejo Subregion dates back to 200,000 B.C. when the territory was crossed by migratory Neanderthal peoples from the north of Europe in the Lower Paleolithic period. Until their extinction, around 28,000 B.C., Neanderthal man hunted and foraged in present-day Portugal. Later, the area was home to several cultures due to the abundance of minerals and its commercial and strategic place along the Mediterranean. The earliest settlements began with Celtiberians, from the central Iberian Peninsula around the 6th Century B.C., and were followed by the Celts. From the 3rd Century, tribal clans were replaced by organized oppidum, a fortified organized city with a defined territory that included many castro villages constructed from large boulders or earthworks.

The first evidence of early cultures in the area of Castro Verde was the discovery of the 'Syllabary of Espança', which was found near the village of Neves-Corvo in the civil parish of Santa Bárbara de Padrões. This archaeological stone contains a Southwest Paleohispanic script, using Tartessian script and language, identified as being the most ancient paleohispanic script; related to the Phoenician alphabet, it is the closest European connection to the Phoenician culture. The Tartessian culture was the precursors of the Turdetani peoples of the Roman period. Growth of settlements during the classic period were likely associated with the strategic importance of the Iberian Pyrite zone. Castro Verde lies along a transport route linking the mines of Aljustrel (20 km to the north) with the port city of Mértola (40 km to the east) situated on tributaries of the Guadiana river. During the Roman occupation, the extensive mining and warehousing of minerals required protective fortifications and mineral warehouses: in the Castro Verde territory there are remains of more than 20 such small structures. Along with mining activities, the area became a vast area of grain production and cattle/sheep-grazing. The richness and abundance of these combined 'base economies' grew to such extent that Castro Verde became a regional centre of commerce and thus a crossroad of cultures within the Mediterranean area.

The name origin of Castro Verde dates back to this early period, with two interpretations cited for its name. One postulates that the name was derived from the Roman Castra Castrorum and combined the verde (meaning "green") to indicate new. A more consistent interpretation is that the name was derived from Castrum Veteris, meaning the oldest castro, to differentiate it from another castro that existed on a small plateau (where the Chapel of São Martinho exists) and was abandoned during the Middle Ages. The term castro derived from the Latin castrum refers to a small military encampment or fortification, built of large rocks.

Roman occupation spanned four centuries and was followed by the migration of the Visigoths (300-700 A.C.) their expulsion by the Moors (in 711), and in turn, their expulsion from the area during the Christian Reconquista. The Battle of Ourique, where Afonso I triumphed over five Moorish Kings occurred in São Pedro das Cabeças, approximately five kilometres from the village of Castro Verde, and paved the way for the creation of the Kingdom of Portugal (in the Treaty of Zamora in 1143). As the legend of the Battle describes, the battle lasted two days (between 24 and 25 July 1139) and was so excessively bloody that the waters of Ribeira de Cobres flowed the color of red. Afonso Henriques who was declared Prince of Portugal, after the Battle of São Mamede, defeated the Moorish kings (at the Battle of Ourique), and was then proclaimed King upon the victory. But, although King Afonso was able to triumph, the region was never definitely secured by the Portuguese until the regin of King Sancho II, around 1234, when the Castle of Aljustrel was captured. Later, the Royal Basilica of Castro Verde was commissioned by King Sebastian of Portugal in 1573 to mark the Christian victory over the Moors, with the walls of the central nave covered in azulejos immortalizing the famous battle.

The region of Castro Verde passed into the possession of the priory of the Comenda de Santiago, and its donatários, the Dukes of Aveiro. Castro Verde continued to operate as the central administrative centre and municipal seat, while Casével and Entradas won administrative autonomy. While mineral extraction continued to drive the economy, herding assumed a fundamental part of the regions economy as well. During the 16th and 17th Century, the Campos de Ourique became the destination for many herds from Castela and Serra da Estrela, creating a new economic, social and cultural dimension to the municipality.

Although the human ecology of this territory has been marked by the settlement of many civilizations all based on mining, cereal cultivation and cattle/sheep grazing, it was only in the beginning of the 14th century that territories became organized as distinct economic entities within the new kingdom. During this post-reconquista era, the vast pasture-lands of the Castro Verde area were granted to nobility by King Denis (the Farmer King) which resulted in the management of thousands of hectares under rotational cultivation to become the bread basket of Portugal and the most important pastureland of the country. Over the centuries, the territory has been continually influenced by a transhumance which has left a unique cultural identity in the form of architecture, arts, music, song, and poetry expressing the daily activities of a people living on the land.

In the middle of the 19th century, the surrounding municipal districts were reorganized and Castro Verde was formalized within its current boundaries: it had received its town charter (Foral) in 1510 by King Manuel I of Portugal. The municipality of Castro Verde developed its own particular cultural identity based on millenniums of interchange between cultural groups. From roots in mining and agricultural, the community has transformed into a city, with future plans focused on the integration of Roman and Islamic architecture in modern eco-architecture. Cultural tourism has resurged to keep alive traditional art, music and poetry indigenous to the territory. The year 2010 marked year-long festivities to celebrate the 500th anniversary of the town charters of Castro Verde and Casével.

== Geography ==
=== Physical geography ===
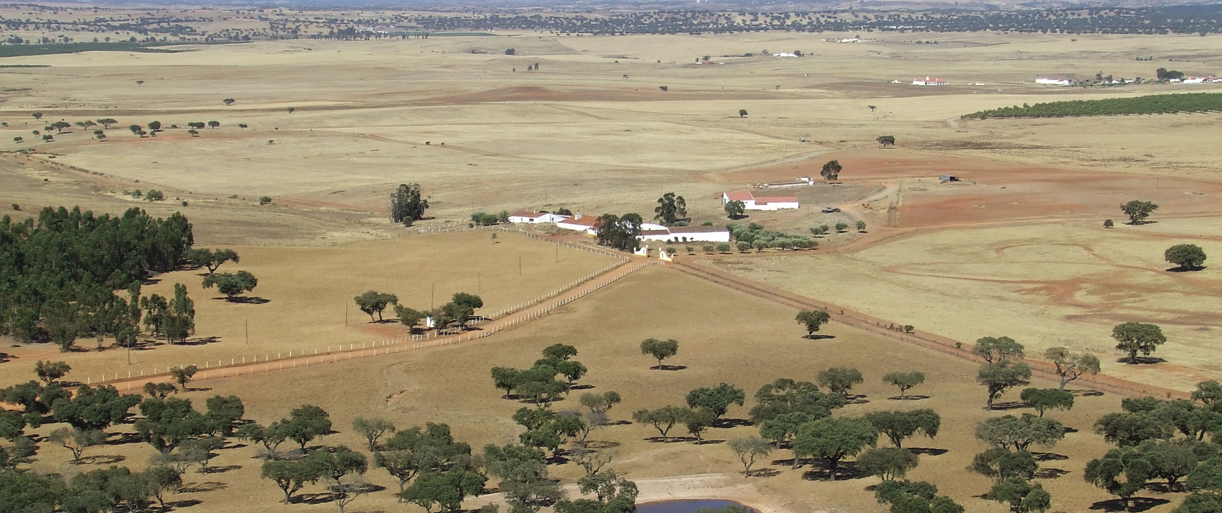

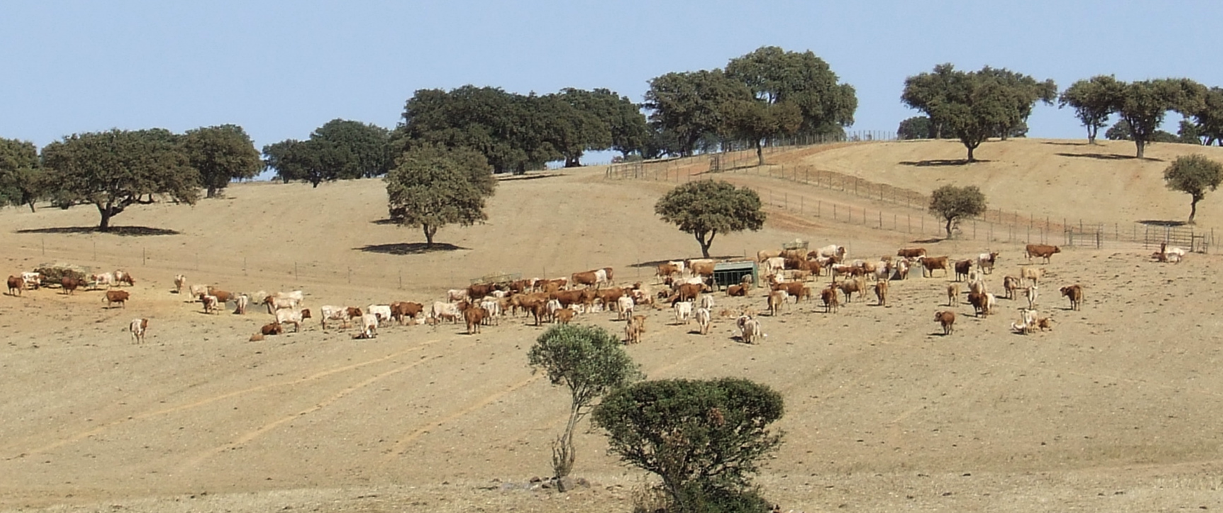

The Castro Verde area is made up of extensive areas of rolling hills, geomorphological structures referred to as a peneplains, which vary in altitude from 300 to 900 ft (100–300 m.) above sea level. The area has planar relief, with a medium altitude of approximately 200 metres; the lowest point is about 110 metres, in the civil parish of São Marcos da Atabueira, near the Ribeira de Cobres (in northeast frontier with the municipality of Beja). The highest point, at 299 metres, is located at a geodesic marker (Urza) on the Cerro da Bandeira, within the civil parish of Castro Verde. Slopes in this area are between 0-2% grade, although pronounced (15%) along the ravines of Cobres and Maria Delgada, and the vicinity of Ribeira de Oeiras (near the border with Almodôvar). In addition to these rivers, the municipality is crossed by other ribeiras (English: ravines or rivers): Ribeira de Alvacar, Ribeira da Fontinha, Ribeira de Terges, Ribeira da Chada, Ribeira da Sete and Ribeira da Gata.

The soils within the municipality are considered poor, having a reduced capacity to support agriculture, and thus limiting its productive use historically. The subsoils are made-up of essentially granular schists, greywacke, sandstone, and in some areas quartzite, as well as rare volcanic metamorphic particulates with reduced permeability. Further, the municipality of Castro Verde is crossed by the Iberian Pyrite Belt, composed of a massive volcanogenic sulfide deposit (VMS) associated with the polymetallic flanks of volcanic cones in the form of pyrite, chalcopyrite, sphalerite, galena and cassiterite, that begins in Aljustrel, spreads through the lower Alentejo and extends into southern Spain. At a time when Portugal was separated by the sea from the rest of the Iberian Peninsula, a series of events connected to active and hydrothermal volcanism, lead to the formation of the volcano-sedimentary Pyrite complex (when the landmass of Portugal collided into the Iberian peninsula). Castro Verde lies on one of the most important extractive deposits in Europe, that is responsible for sustaining the economy of the region, albeit an area with elevated risk of erosion. Mining activity, as a consequence, dates back thousands of years, with the remains of Roman mining structures identifying the importance of this area to the expansion of Roman metallurgy. In addition to sulfide ore, this southern area of Lusitania, was an abundant source of other minerals, such as gold, silver, copper, tin, lead and iron.

=== Ecoregions/protected areas ===
A large part of the municipality is covered by the European Union's Natura 2000 project; it is denoted as a Special Protection Area (SPA) for endangered species of steppe birds such as the great bustard and lesser kestrel.

=== Climate ===
Castro Verde has a hot-summer mediterranean climate (Köppen: Csa) with some Atlantic influence. It has hot dry summers and mild wet winters. The average annual temperature falls normally between 16–17 °C (61–63 °F). During the warmer months, maximum temperatures can reach or exceed 43 °C (109 °F); during the winter, night temperatures can sometimes fall below the freezing point (9 days per year on average). Annual precipitation averages around 450 to 500 millimetres (18 to 20 in), 32% of which is concentrated in the two wettest months, November and December, while July and August are the driest receiving some or no precipitation.

Climate data for Neves-Corvo mine, Castro Verde, Beja, Portugal, 1991-2020 normals and 1981-2020 extremes
Month	Jan	Feb	Mar	Apr	May	Jun	Jul	Aug	Sep	Oct	Nov	Dec	Year
Record high °C (°F)	22.0 (71.6)	25.2 (77.4)	29.0 (84.2)	33.0 (91.4)	38.6 (101.5)	44.1 (111.4)	45.6 (114.1)	45.8 (114.4)	43.8 (110.8)	35.8 (96.4)	28.7 (83.7)	24.7 (76.5)	45.8 (114.4)
Mean daily maximum °C (°F)	14.7 (58.5)	16.1 (61.0)	19.2 (66.6)	21.3 (70.3)	25.5 (77.9)	30.5 (86.9)	33.8 (92.8)	33.7 (92.7)	29.6 (85.3)	24.3 (75.7)	18.5 (65.3)	15.5 (59.9)	23.6 (74.4)
Daily mean °C (°F)	9.5 (49.1)	10.5 (50.9)	13.0 (55.4)	14.9 (58.8)	18.3 (64.9)	22.3 (72.1)	24.8 (76.6)	25.0 (77.0)	22.1 (71.8)	18.2 (64.8)	13.3 (55.9)	10.5 (50.9)	16.9 (62.4)
Mean daily minimum °C (°F)	4.3 (39.7)	4.8 (40.6)	6.8 (44.2)	8.6 (47.5)	11.1 (52.0)	14.2 (57.6)	15.9 (60.6)	16.2 (61.2)	14.7 (58.5)	12.0 (53.6)	8.0 (46.4)	5.5 (41.9)	10.2 (50.3)
Record low °C (°F)	−7.1 (19.2)	−5.5 (22.1)	−4.0 (24.8)	−1.0 (30.2)	−0.5 (31.1)	6.4 (43.5)	10.0 (50.0)	10.5 (50.9)	7.0 (44.6)	2.9 (37.2)	−1.6 (29.1)	−3.8 (25.2)	−7.1 (19.2)
Average precipitation mm (inches)	53.7 (2.11)	40.6 (1.60)	49.9 (1.96)	46.1 (1.81)	31.3 (1.23)	8.0 (0.31)	0.8 (0.03)	4.0 (0.16)	22.4 (0.88)	59.9 (2.36)	71.4 (2.81)	75.3 (2.96)	463.6 (18.25)
Average precipitation days (≥ 1 mm)	7.3	5.8	6.7	6.6	5.1	1.0	0.2	0.5	2.6	6.8	7.3	8.1	57.9
Source: IPMA

=== Human geography ===
Castro Verde Municipality is situated within an area commonly known as "Campo Branco", within the plains of the Alentejo that front the Serra do Caldeirão. It is located in the district of Beja, and limited to the north by the municipalities of Beja and Aljustrel, south by the municipality of Almodôvar, east by the municipality of Mértola and west by the municipality of Ourique. Over the past few decades, the population has generally concentrated in the larger urban communities. In 1970, the population of the municipality was 9004 inhabitants, decreasing to 7472 by 1981. Ten years later, it had grown slowly to 7786 residents, although the recent census (2001) indicated a small decrease (fixed at 7603 inhabitants). The literacy rates are relatively high, although 15.7% are considered illiterate. This is accentuated by 70% of the resident population having attained only a primary school level of education.

==== Parishes ====
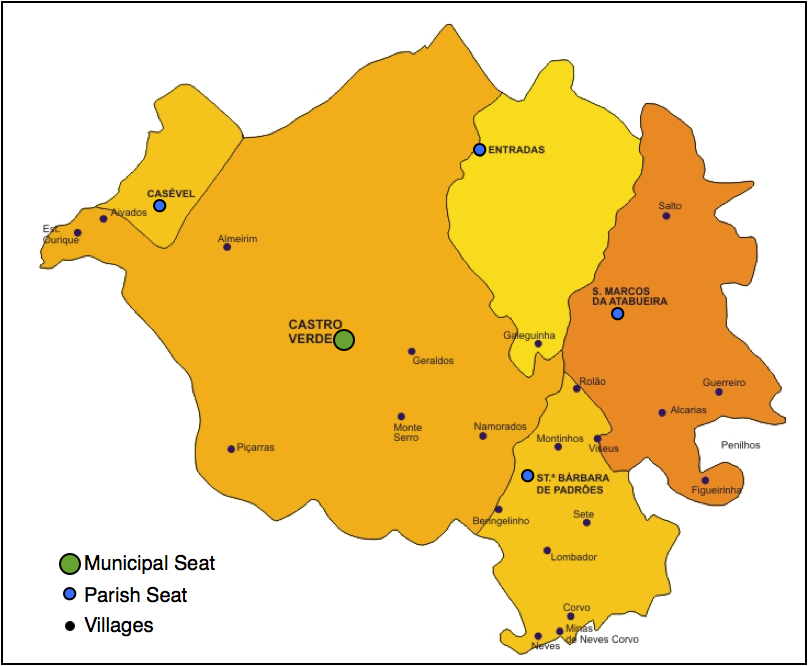
Castro Verde Municipality, showing the constituent parts (freguesias)

More than 50% of these residents live in the town of Castro Verde (4820 residents); the remaining towns account for the rest: Casével, 365 inhabitants; Entradas, 774 inhabitants; Santa Bárbara dos Padrões, 1271 inhabitants; and São Marcos da Atabueira, 373 inhabitants. With an area 567.2 km2, these communities are scattered in various medium to small localities divided into four civil parishes (Portuguese: freguesias):

- Castro Verde e Casével
- Entradas
- Santa Bárbara de Padrões
- São Marcos da Ataboeira

== Economy ==
Population growth has primarily been the result developments with the mining industry, and in particular the Neves-Corvo mining complex. Its activities, and related services, civil construction and public works have seen reciprocal growth in municipal services and population. There has also been a parallel growth in mining jobs related to this development, since 1979.

There is a hierarchical distribution of the active workforce: 11.12% are employed in the primary sector, 32.7% in secondary industries, while a majority (56.18%) are employed in tertiary services. This distribution is generally maintained in all communities in the municipality, except Santa Bárbara dos Padrões, where the Neves-Corvo mine is the main employer, and Entradas, where some agriculture and ranching occur.

== Transport ==
Castro Verde is located in a privileged location along a corridor that connects the northern districts to the Algarve, and fundamental access to communication lines:

The airports in Faro (100 km), Lisbon (190 km) and Sevilha (270 km) and the maritime port of Sines (95 km) are conveniently located to access other major centres.

Connections to other locations within the country are made through the road network: to the Litoral Alentejo through Ourique (E.N. 123); to the coastal Algarve (along the A2 and I.C.1); to Lisbon via the A2; to Mértola (on the E.N. 123); to Almodôvar (along the E.N.2); and to Beja and Évora (on the I.P.2).

Within the municipality, public transport connects all localities by at least one service (except on the weekends), and a national Express service connects Castro Verde communities to stations in Beja, Évora, Lisbon and Algarve, in addition to Tomar, Coimbra, Porto, Braga and Elvas.

== Architecture ==
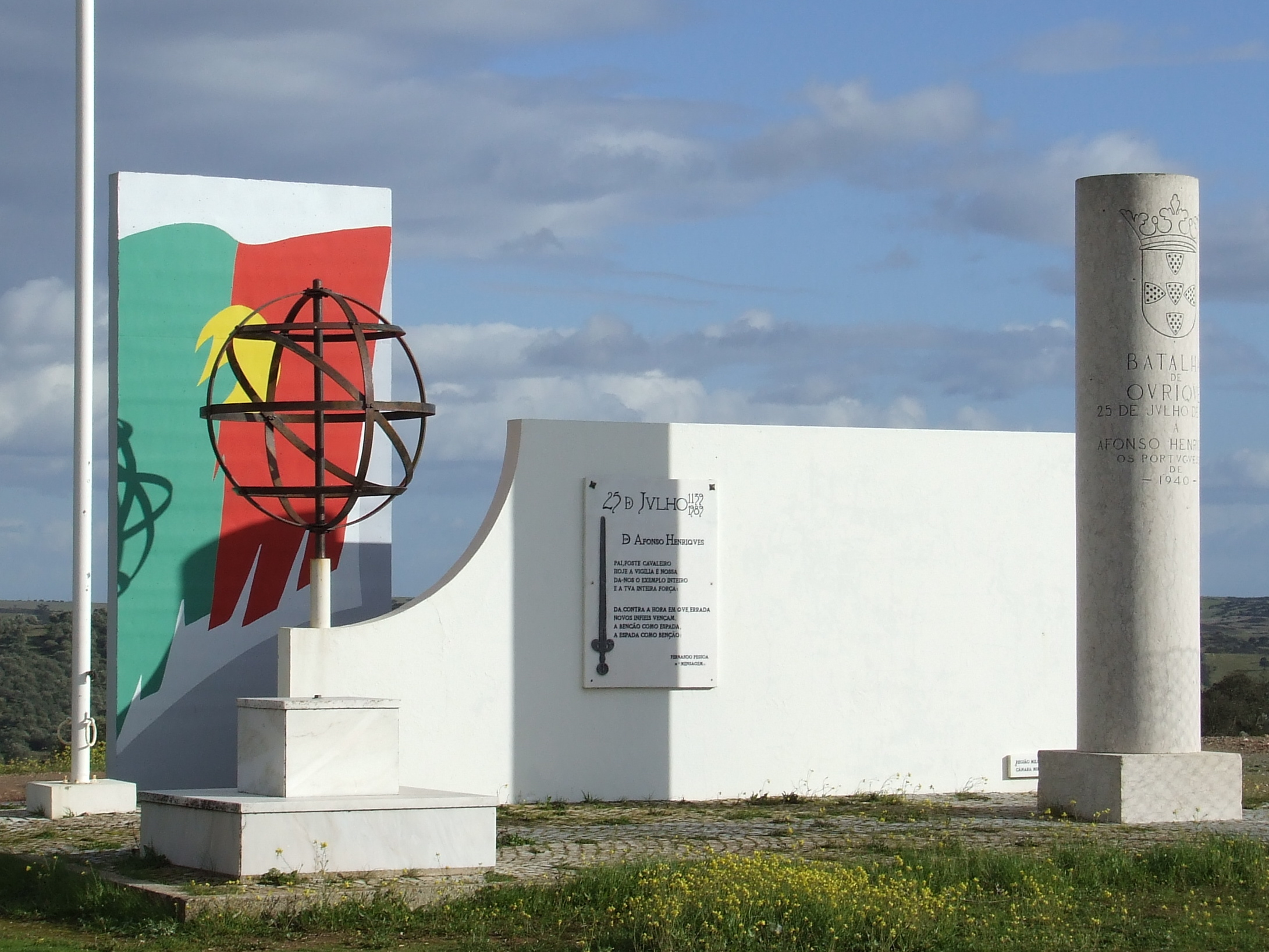
The Estado Novo-era monument to the Battle of Ourique, not be confused with the commemorative pillory of the Battle of Ourique

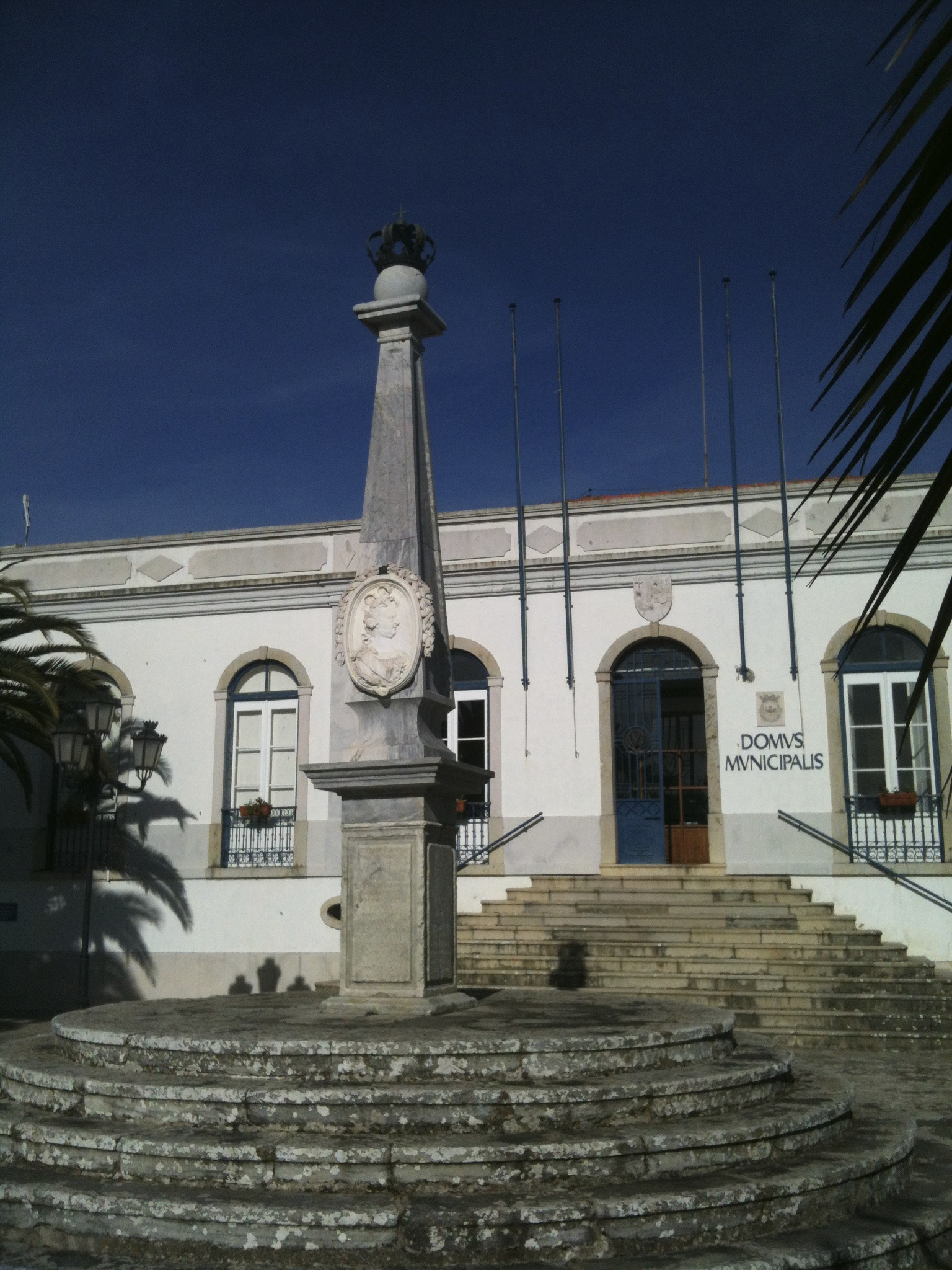
Commemorative pillory of the Battle of Ourique located on the Municipal Hall plaza

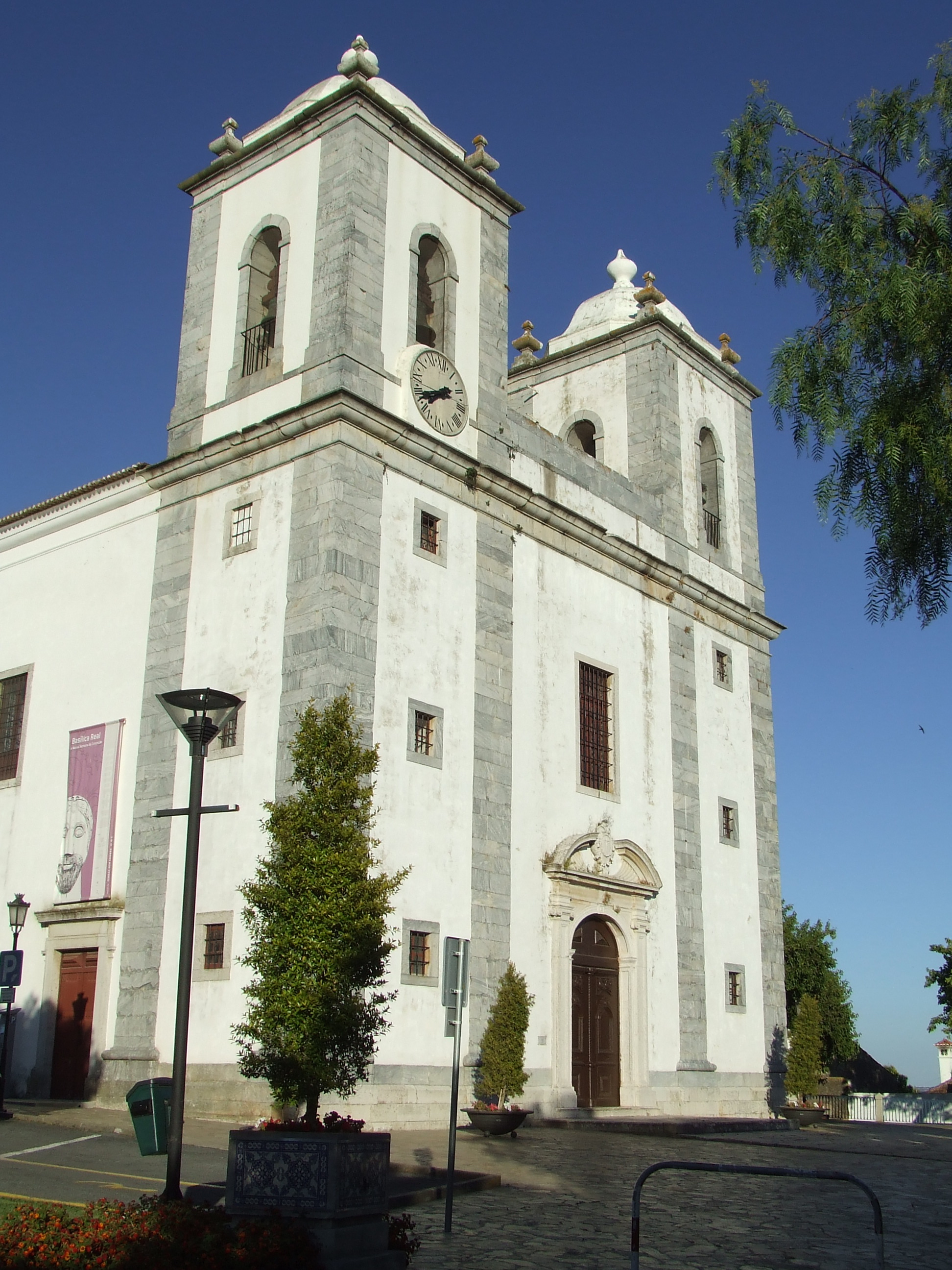
The Royal Basilica of Castro Verde, the actual Church of Nossa Senhora da Conceição, constructed by King Sebastian to honour Afonso Henriques for his defeat of the Moorish kings at the Battle of Ourique

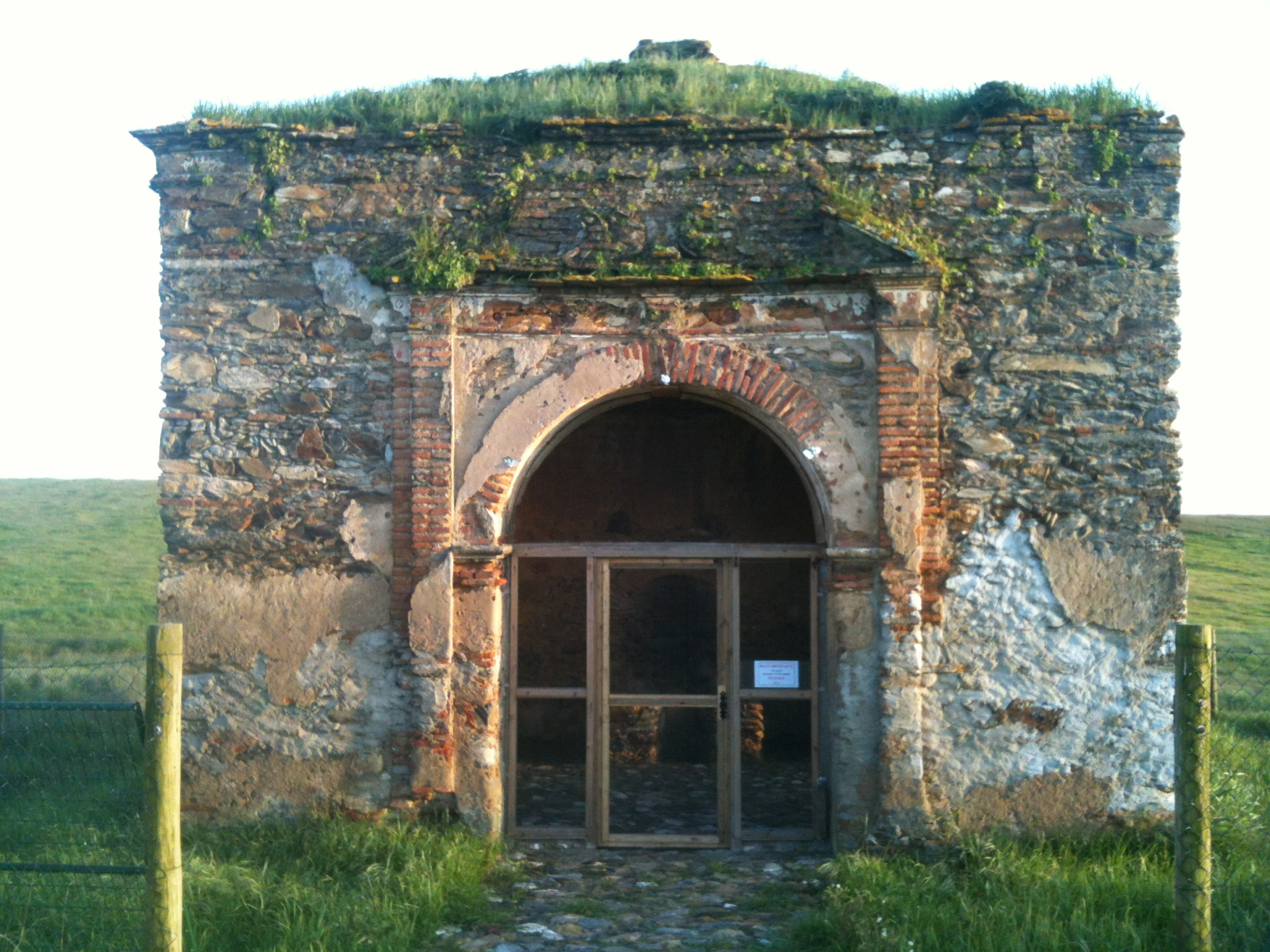
Fonte de Milagre temple dating from 1714 (built during the same period as the Chapel of São Miguel)

=== Civic ===
- Commemorative Pillory of the Battle of Ourique (Padrão comemorativo da Batalha de Ourique), originally erected along the northern side the Chapel of São Pedro in 1785, this marker was moved to the site of the municipal council hall around 1960. It had, around 9 May 1792, been modified to include a medallion with the image of Queen Maria II, whose bust was affixed under the words "...of the glorious apparition of Christ Our Father to our first monarch D. Afonso Henriques". During a hurricane, on the evening of the 7–8 December 1803, the monument was damaged at its narrowest point, but reconstructed. It was moved to the civic square in 1960, after being ruined by a lightning strike, wherein only the original staircase, base and the medallion survived the incident;
- Source of Miracle of Saint Michael (Fonte de Milagre de São Miguel), is a temple enclosing a water well, located 7 kilometres (4.3 mi) outside of Castro Verde is situated on the property Herdade do Mourão and dates from 1714, having been built during the same period as the Chapel of São Miguel. The chapel is situated nearby on higher ground, but both were originally constructed over pre-existing structures of unconfirmed dates. In 1982, historian Abílio Pereira de Carvalho, appointed by his regent in Lisbon to research local history (and teach at the local high school), discovered more than 230 manuscripts under the main altar of the Basilica Real of Castro Verde. His study of the manuscripts revealed information relating the history of the Fonte de Milagre and Chapel of São Miguel, leading him to write a 174-page book, all of which relate to the two sites and the healing activities carried out there for centuries. Published in 1989, by the municipal authority of Castro Verde, the factual material found in the manuscripts details the connection between the two locales and the healing properties of the 'Fonte' (noting regular visits by pilgrims from around the Iberian Peninsula). The site's curative effects were of such significance that King John V (1706–1750) was compelled to become directly involved in the administration of the site. The administration relationship between the "Chapel" and "Fonte" no longer exists and the rich heritage has been hidden from recent history, laying dormant for more than 150 years. However the chapel has been classified by IGESPAR as a Property of Public Interest; and in 2008, the Associação de S. Miguel para Medicina Bio-Energética was formed as a non-profit organisation to research the viability of reestablishing treatment protocols at the 'Fonte de Milagre' since it continues as a powerful area of therapeutic action. The site of the temple and water well has been in a phase recovery since 2009.

=== Religious ===
- Church of Nossa Senhora da Conceição (Portuguese: Igreja Matriz de Castro Verde/Igreja de Nossa Senhora da Conceição/Basílica Real de Castro Verde), the basilica dates back to the reign of King John V (1706–1750), and was erected over an older temple, that had already been remodelled in the reign of King Sebastian (1568–1578). Consisting of a central nave, lateral sacristies and two bell towers, one with a clock. Its interior walls are covered in panels of azulejo representing the Battle of Ourique and its ceiling is composed of polychromatic wood, with gold-leaf altars in the Baroque- and Joanino-styles.
- Church of Nossa Senhora dos Remédios (Igreja Igreja das Chagas do Salvador/Igreja de Nossa Senhora dos Remédios), also referred to as the Church of Our Lord's Stimgmata, is dedicated to Our Lady of Medicine and founded by Afonso Henriques following the . During the 17th Century, the church was mostly in ruins, when Philip II decided to restore the church by collecting funds through a fair (which was first held in 1620); the Feira de Castro would persist until 1834, before it became a secular event of the Baixo Alentejo region. Oil paintings by Diogo Magina (1763–67), representing the Milagre de Ourique (Miracle of Ourique), where an apparition of Jesus Christ appeared to Afonso Henriques, in the vicinity of São Pedro das Cabeças, 5 kilometres (3.1 mi) from Castro Verde. The single-nave church includes several azulejos depicting flowers, birds and windmills, that were created in the Netherlands.
- Chapel of São Miguel (English: Chapel of Saint Michael) – Constructed between 1715 and 1728, on the orders of King João V, over the ruins an older church, the construction was remodeled on similar orders of Queen Maria I of Portugal (1760–1779) with a revised interior of azulejos from Lisbon.
- Chapel of São Sebastião (Ermida de São Sebastião), the simple, single-nave hermitage was also part of the "late", 17th century Manueline tradition of pilgrimage chapels (the chapel is the focus of annual celebrations on the feast day of Saint Sebastian, held on 20 January each year), recognizable for the painted vaulted retable;
- Chapel of São Pedro das Cabeças (Ermida de São Pedro das Cabeça), 5 kilometres (3.1 mi) from Geraldos, the 15th-century temple is a rural sanctuary, and devotional site for pilgrims: it is located on the plain that was part of the mythical Battle of Ourique, where Afonso Henriques triumphed over five Moorish Kings. The chapel is located at the high point along the plain, and was ordered constructed by King Sebastian, to pay homage to the first King of Portugal and his historical victory.

== Notable citizens ==
- Alfredo Luís da Costa (1883 in Casével – 1908) a publicist, editor, journalist, store clerk and salesman, one of the two assassins of King Carlos I of Portugal and Luis Filipe, Prince Royal of Portugal during the 1908 Lisbon Regicide.
- Rogério Contreiras (1922–1990) a former football goalkeeper with a three-year spell at Benfica
- Frederico Rosa (1957–2019) a professional footballer with 397 club caps

== See also ==
- Timeline of Portuguese history
- Prehistoric Iberia
