= David Tsebe =

South African marathon runner

Kagiso (David) Tsebe (born 9 November 1966) is a retired marathon runner from South Africa. He won the 1992 edition of the Berlin Marathon on 27 September 1992, clocking 2:08:07. With that time Tsebe ended up in first place in the year rankings.

== Achievements ==
- All results regarding marathon, unless stated otherwise

Year	Competition	Venue	Position	Notes
Representing South Africa
1988	South African Athletics Championships	Cape Town, South Africa	2nd	2:12:14
1988	Port Elizabeth Marathon	Port Elizabeth, South Africa	1st	2:14:06
1988	Honolulu Marathon	Honolulu, United States	2nd	2:15:12
1989	South African Athletics Championships	Port Elizabeth, South Africa	2nd	2:13:42
1989	Port Elizabeth Marathon	Port Elizabeth, South Africa	1st	2:10:48
1989	Durban Marathon	Durban, South Africa	1st	2:10:47
1990	South African Athletics Championships	Port Elizabeth, South Africa	1st	2:09:50
1990	Ford Marathon	Port Elizabeth, South Africa	1st	2:12:14
1990	Durban Marathon	Durban, South Africa	1st	2:13:23
1991	Peninsula Marathon	Cape Town, South Africa	1st	2:15:39
1991	South African Athletics Championships	Durban, South Africa	2nd	2:10:32
1992	South African Athletics Championships	Cape Town, South Africa	7th	2:14:35
1992	Berlin Marathon	Berlin, Germany	1st	2:08:07
1992	Honolulu Marathon	Honolulu, United States	3rd	2:16:45
1993	Boston Marathon	Boston, United States	23rd	2:18:15
1993	Berlin Marathon	Berlin, Germany	3rd	2:12:07

Source:Association of Road Racing Statisticians (ARRS)-Runner:David Tsebe
