= Neves-Corvo mine =

Mine in Portugal

Coordinates: 37°34′23″N 7°58′15″W

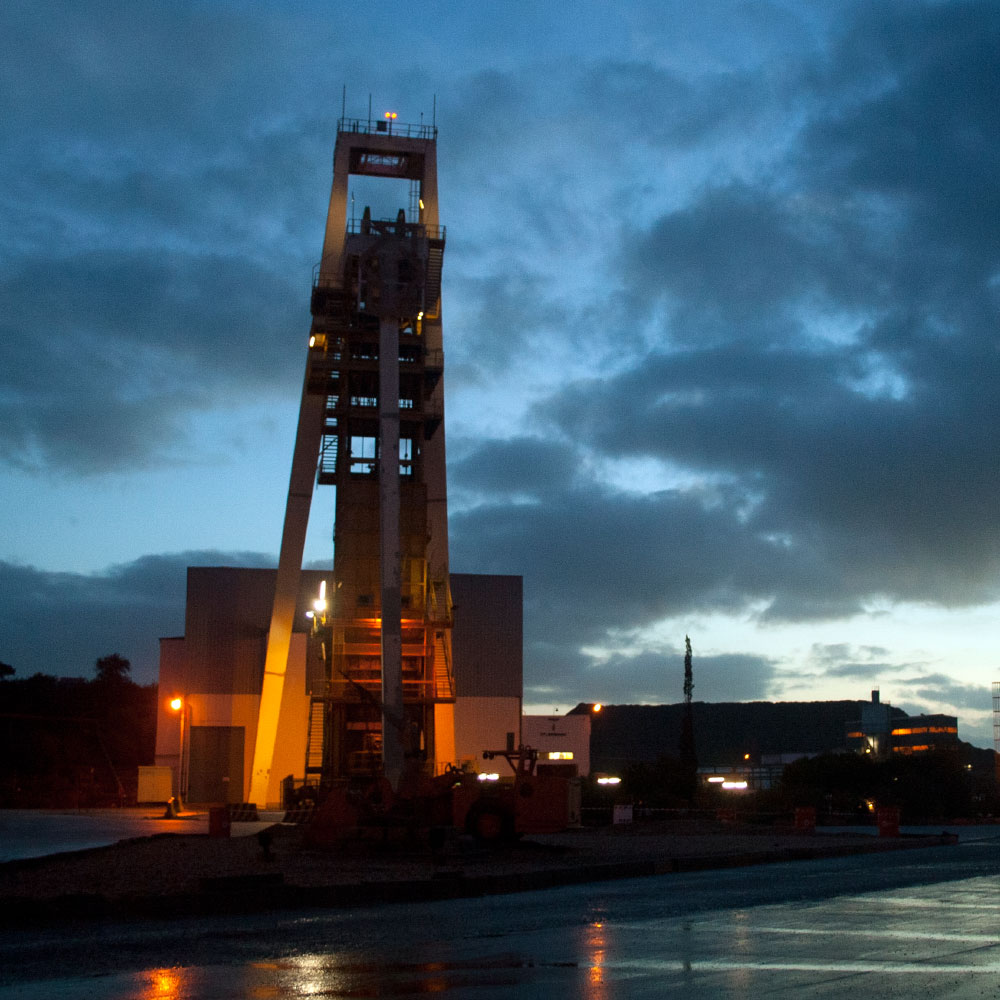
- Santa Barbara hoisting shaft. Neves-Corvo mine
- Interactive map of Neves-Corvo mine
- Location: Castro Verde, Portugal
- Products: Copper; Zinc
- Opened: 1988; 38 years ago
- Company: Somincor, a subsidiary of Boliden AB

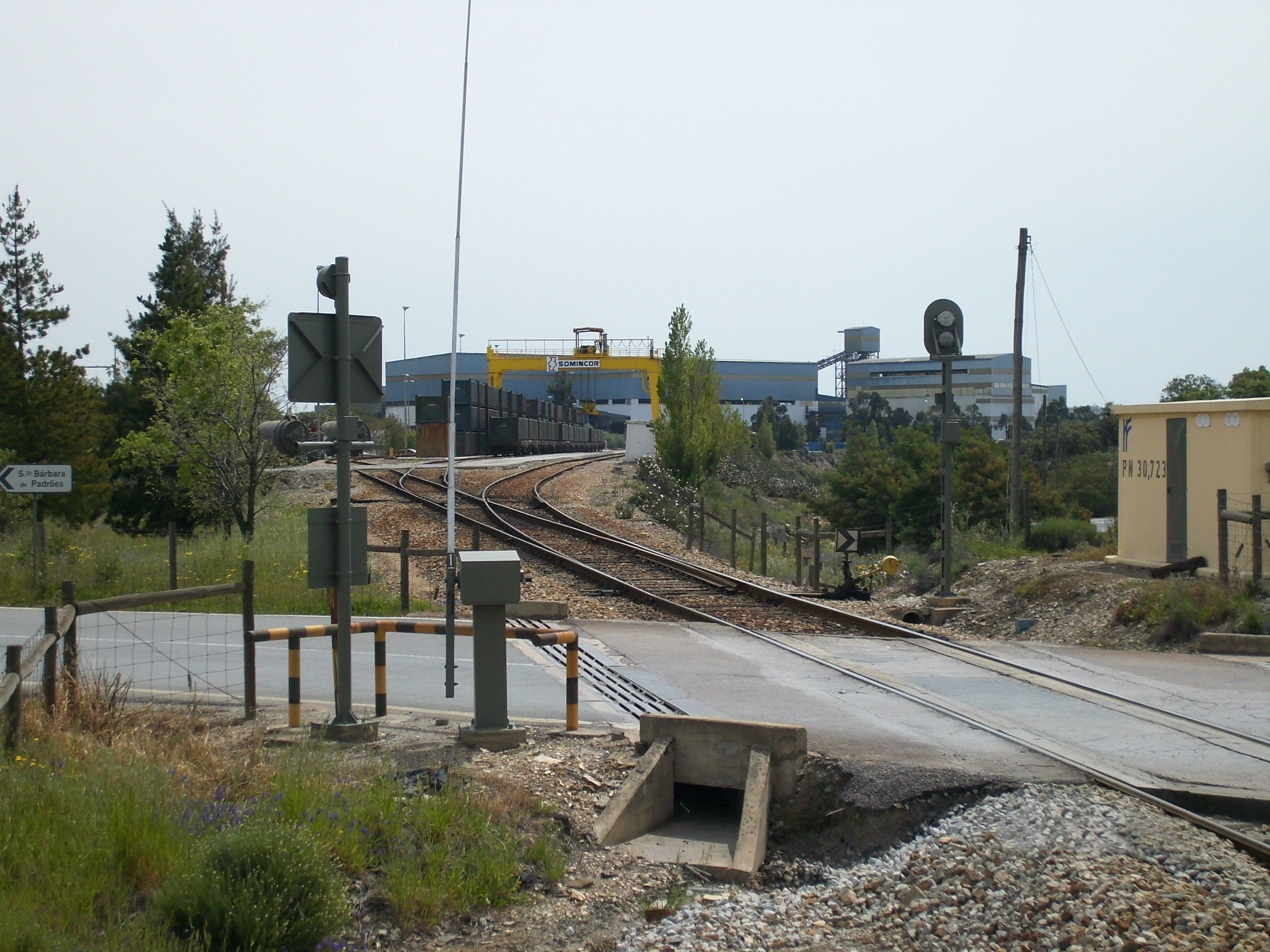
Ramal da Mina de Neves Corvo

Neves-Corvo mine is a zinc-copper mine 15 km southeast of Castro Verde, Portugal and 220 km southeast of Lisbon, in the district of Beja (Baixo Alentejo). It has a dedicated rail link, the Ramal de Neves Corvo, to the main Linha do Sul railway, allowing export to the port of Setúbal and others. The mine is principally accessed by shaft mining and a ramp from surface. It is owned by Somnicor, which is owned by Boliden AB.

== History ==
The deposit was found in 1977 following the discovery of a gravimetric anomaly part of the geophysical study of the Iberian Pyrite Belt (IPB) in south Portugal. The IPB, which stretches through southern Spain into Portugal, itself is arguably the largest and one of the most important VMS metallogenic province in the world

The Neves-Corvo volcanogenic massive sulphide (VMS) deposit, is considered the richest known deposit of the Iberian Pyrite Belt (IPB).

In 1988, Somnicor, the owner of the mine, began exploration of the ore deposits.

In June 2004, Somincor was acquired by EuroZinc from Empresa de Desenvolvimento Mineiro and Rio Tinto for $155 million.

In October 2006, EuroZinc was acquired by Lundin Mining.

In May 2017, Lundin Mining announced an expansion project for the mine.

In April 2025, Somnicor was acquired by Boliden AB for US$1.4 billion plus up to an additional US$150 million in contingency payments.

== Accidents and incidents ==
In February 2024, an underground worker died after being buried in a landslide while operating equipment at the bottom of the mine.
