= Ferreira do Alentejo =

- Municipality
- Town of Ferreira do Alentejo
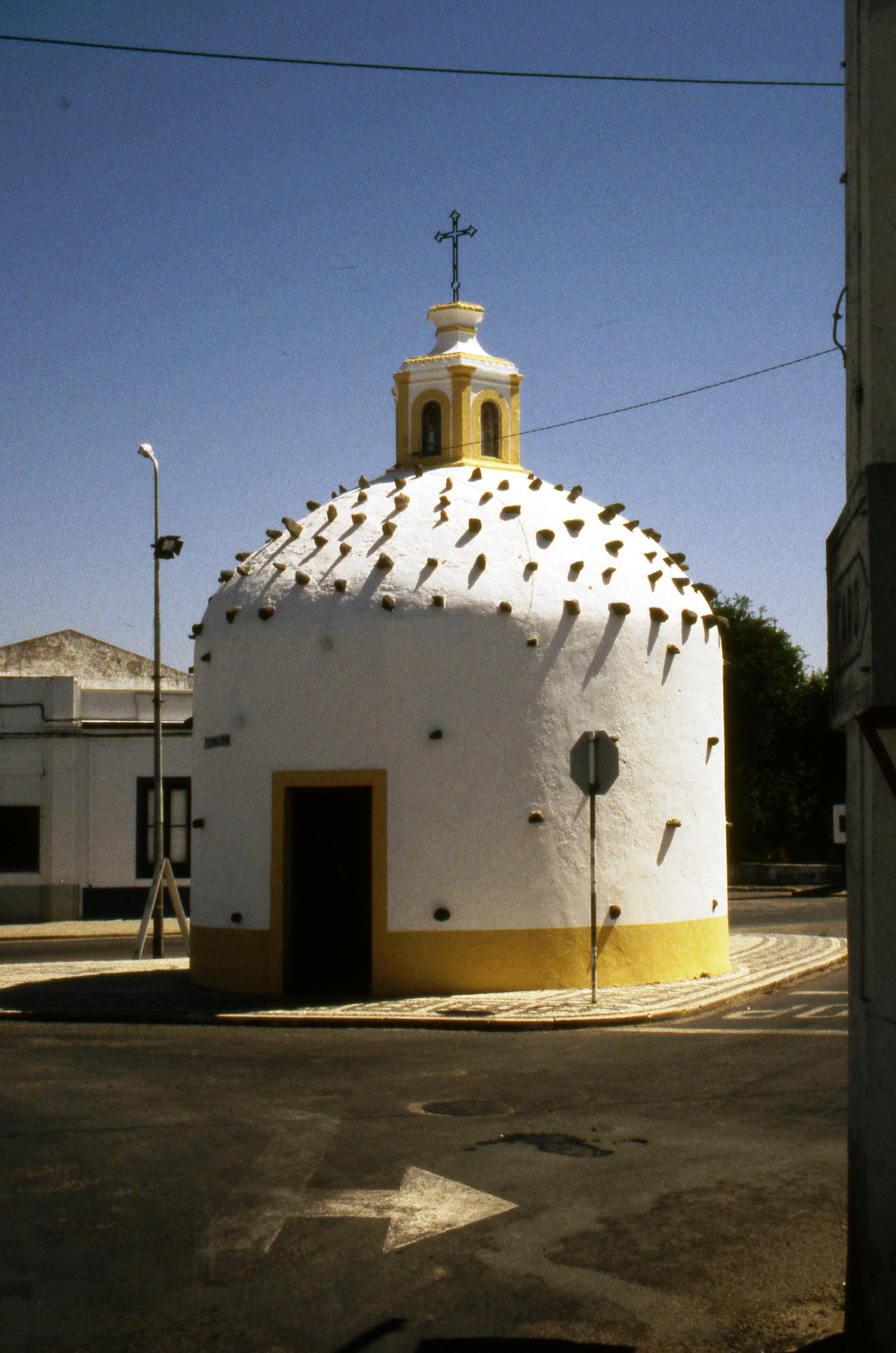
- Chapel of Calvario, Ferreira do Alentejo

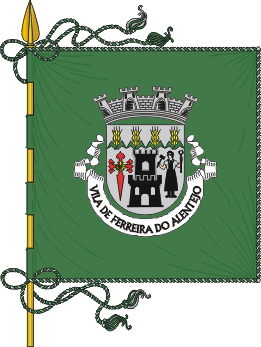
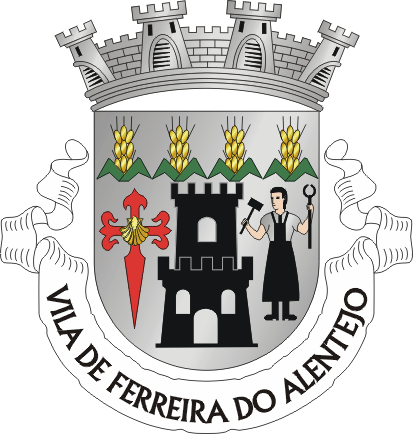
- Flag Coat of arms
- Interactive map of Ferreira do Alentejo
- Location in Portugal
- Coordinates: 38°03′N 8°06′W
- Country: Portugal
- Region: Alentejo
- Intermunic. comm.: Baixo Alentejo
- District: Beja
- Parishes: 4

Government
  - President: Aníbal Costa (PS)

Area
  - Total: 648.25 km^{2} (250.29 sq mi)

Population (2011)
  - Total: 8,255
  - Density: 12.73/km^{2} (32.98/sq mi)
- Time zone: UTC+00:00 (WET)
  - Summer (DST): UTC+01:00 (WEST)
- Local holiday: March 5
- Website: www.cm-ferreira-alentejo.pt

Ferreira do Alentejo (European Portuguese pronunciation: [fɨˈʁɐjɾɐ ðu ɐlẽˈtɛʒu]), officially known as the Town of Ferreira do Alentejo (Portuguese: Vila de Ferreira do Alentejo) and often called simply Ferreira, is a town and a municipality in Beja District in Portugal. The population in 2011 was 8,255, in an area of 648.25 km^{2}.

The human activity in the municipality dates back to antiquity, with evidence of prehistoric and Roman settlement. The village was later controlled by the Order of Saint James of the Sword, having its first charter passed on 5 March 1516 by King Manuel I.

The present Mayor is Aníbal Coelho Costa, elected by the Socialist Party. The municipal holiday is March 5.

== Parishes ==
Administratively, the municipality is divided into 4 civil parishes (freguesias):

- Alfundão e Peroguarda
- Ferreira do Alentejo e Canhestros
- Figueira dos Cavaleiros
- Odivelas
