= Baixo Alentejo (intermunicipal community) =

- Intermunicipal community
- Coordinates: 38°01′N 7°52′W
- Country: Portugal
- Region: Alentejo
- Established: 2009
- Seat: Beja
- Municipalities: 13

Area
  - Total: 8,542.72 km^{2} (3,298.36 sq mi)

Population (2011)
  - Total: 126,692
  - Density: 15/km^{2} (38/sq mi)
- Time zone: UTC+00:00 (WET)
  - Summer (DST): UTC+01:00 (WEST)
- Website: cimbal.pt

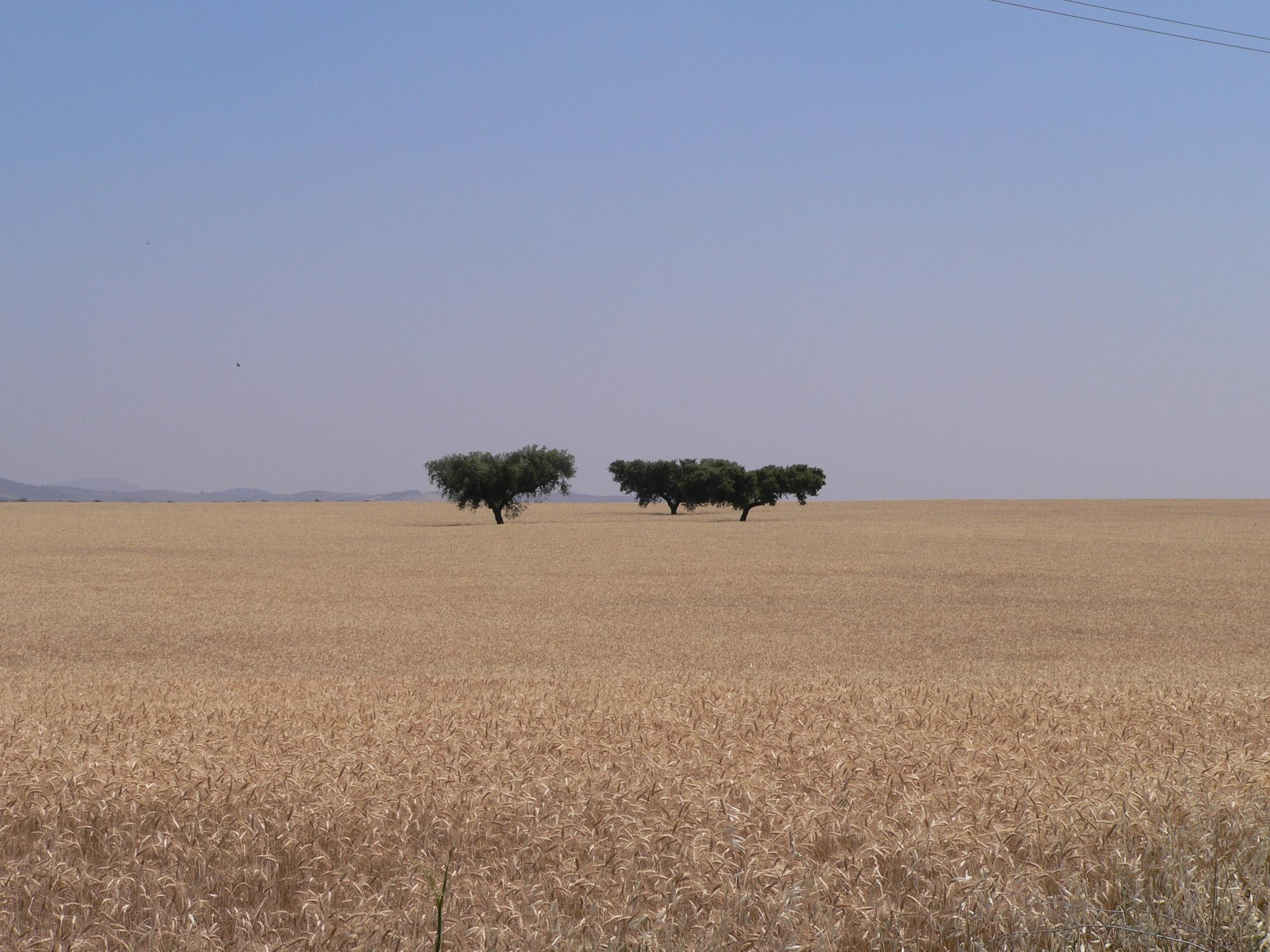
Fields of wheat in Baixo Alentejo

The Comunidade Intermunicipal do Baixo Alentejo (European Portuguese: [ˈbajʃu ɐlẽˈtɛʒu]; "Intermunicipal Community of Lower Alentejo") is an administrative division in Portugal. It was created in 2009. It is also a NUTS3 subregion of the Alentejo Region. The seat of the intermunicipal community is Beja. Baixo Alentejo comprises 13 of the 14 municipalities of the Beja District. The population in 2011 was 126,692, in an area of 8,542.72 km^{2}.

It is bordered on the North by Alentejo Central Subregion, on the East by Spain, on the South by the Algarve and on the West by Alentejo Litoral. It covers the Eastern part of the former Baixo Alentejo Province.

== Municipalities ==
It is composed of 13 municipalities:

Municipality	Population (2011)	Area (km^{2})
Aljustrel	9,257	458.47
Almodôvar	7,449	777.88
Alvito	2,504	264.85
Barrancos	1,834	168.42
Beja	35,854	1146.44
Castro Verde	7,276	569.44
Cuba	4,878	172.09
Ferreira do Alentejo	8,255	648.25
Mértola	7,274	1292.87
Moura	15,167	958.46
Ourique	5,389	663.31
Serpa	15,623	1105.63
Vidigueira	5,932	316.61
Total	126,692	8,542.72
