= Beja Football Association =

Portuguese football association

Associação de Futebol de Beja
- Abbreviation: AF Beja
- Formation: 1925
- Purpose: District Football Association
- Headquarters: Rua Pablo Neruda Nº 1 A/B
- Location(s): Apartado 6176 7800-327 Beja Portugal
- President: José Mâncio Rosa Soeiro
- Website: afbeja.com

The Associação de Futebol de Beja (Beja Football Association) is one of the 22 District Football Associations that are affiliated to the Portuguese Football Federation. The AF Beja administers lower tier football in the district of Beja.

== Background ==
Associação de Futebol de Beja, commonly referred to as AF Beja, is the governing body for football in the district of Beja. The Football Association is based in Beja. The Association's President is José Mâncio Rosa Soeiro. The organisation was established on 30 March 1925.

The leading club up until 1945/46 was Luso Sporting Clube (known as Luso Beja) who won the District Championship on 19 occasions. The club was founded in 1916 and first won the championship in 1924/25 when it was run on an unofficial basis.

== Competitions ==
Beja clubs compete in the third national level of the Portuguese football league system in Campeonato Nacional de Seniores, competition run by the Portuguese Football Federation.

Below the Campeonato Nacional de Seniores the competitions are organised at a district level (known in Portuguese as Distritais) with each District Association organising its competitions according to geographical and other factors. The AF Beja runs two league competitions with the Division One (1ª divisão) being at the fourth level of the league system and Division Two (2ª divisão) at the fifth level. At one time this second tier was divided into two groups (série A and série B) on a geographical basis.

In more general terms the AF Beja currently organises District Championships for football and Futsal for men and women for all age groups including Senior, Junior, Youth, Beginners, Infants and Schools.

== Notable clubs affiliated to AF Beja ==
Segunda Divisão (tier 3)

- Moura Atlético Clube
- Clube Desportivo de Almodôvar

Distritais (tiers 4 & 5)

- Clube Desportivo de Beja
- Sport Clube Mineiro Aljustrelense

== Current Divisions - 2011–12 Season ==
The AF Beja runs the following division covering the fifth and sixth tiers of the Portuguese football league system.

=== 1ª divisão ===
- Associação Juventude Desportiva Rosairense
- Clube Atlético Aldenovense
- Clube de Futebol Guadiana
- Clube de Futebol Vasco da Gama
- Clube Desportivo de Almodovar
- Clube Desportivo de Beja
- Clube Desportivo e Cultural de Panóias
- Clube Desportivo Praia de Milfontes
- Futebol Clube Castrense
- Futebol Clube de São Marcos
- Futebol Clube de Serpa
- Sport Clube Odemirense
- Sporting Clube de Cuba
- Sporting Clube Ferreirense

=== 2ª divisão ===
- Alvorada Futebol Clube
- Barrancos Futebol Clube
- Centro de Cultura e Desporto do Bairro Nª Sª da Conceição
- Clube Recreativo e Desportivo de Cabeça Gorda
- Futebol Clube de Vale de Vargo
- Grupo Desportivo Amarelejense
- Grupo Desportivo Messejanense
- Grupo Desportivo Renascente de São Teotónio
- Negrilhos Futebol Clube
- Ourique Desportos Clube
- Piense Sport Clube
- Sabóia Atlético Clube
- Sociedade Recreativa e Musical Sanluizense

== Former participants ==
Other clubs that have competed in the Distritais since the 1992/93 season include:

- Associação Cultural Desportiva de Santa Clara-A-Nova
- Associação Cultural e Desportiva de Penedo Gordo
- Associação Cultural e Recreativa Zona Azul
- Atlético Clube de Brinches
- Atlético Clube de Ficalho
- Beira Serra - Grupo Desportivo Recreativo e Cultural Naverredondense
- Centro de Cultura Recreio e Desporto de Santa Vitória
- Centro Cultural e Desportivo de Alfundão
- Clube de Futebol de Santo Aleixo da Restauração
- Clube Desportivo e Cultural de Pedrógão do Alentejo
- Clube Desportivo e Recreativo Salvadense
- Clube Desportivo de Garvão
- Futebol Clube Pereirense
- Grupo Desportivo Casa do Povo Ruins
- Grupo Desportivo e Cultural da Baronia
- Grupo Desportivo de Odivelas
- Grupo Desportivo e Cultural das Neves
- Grupo Desportivo e Cultural de Sete
- Grupo Desportivo e Cultural do Alvito
- Grupo Desportivo e Recreativo de Luzianes-Gare
- Grupo Desportivo e Recreativo de Faro do Alentejo
- Grupo Desportivo Sociedade Filarmónica 24 Outubro (Baleizão)
- Juventude Futebol Clube Boavista
- São Domingos Futebol Clube
- Sociedade Artística Almodovarense
- Sociedade Recreativa e Desportiva Entradense
- Sociedade União Recreativa Sobralense
- Sporting Clube de Peroguarda
- Sporting Clube Figueirense
- Sporting Clube Santaclarense
- União Desportiva Cultural Beringelense

== Other clubs ==
Other clubs that are affiliated to AF Beja include:

- ASB Associação de Surdos de Beja
- Associação Cultural Juventude Almodovarense
- Associação Cultural Recreativa e Desportiva Zambujeirense
- Associação Cultural Recreativa Sadina
- Associação Desportiva de Vila Nova de São Bento
- Associação Jovens de Barrancos “Enguripitados”
- Barrancos Futsal Associação Desportiva e Cultural
- Casa de Cultura da Aldeia dos Fernandes
- Casa do Benfica em Almodôvar
- Casa do Benfica em Beja
- Casa do Benfica em Castro Verde
- Casa do Benfica em Moura
- Casa do Povo de Baleizão
- Casa do Povo de S.Matias
- Centro Cultural e Desportivo de Vila Alva
- Centro de Instrução Recreio Fernandense
- Centro Popular Trabalhadores - Clube Atlético Operário
- Clube Desportivo de Sobral da Adiça
- Clube Recreativo Cultural Gasparões
- Consol Futebol Clube Canhestrense
- Grupo D.S.R. União Vilafradense
- Grupo Desp. Soc. Filarmónica Outubro de Baleizão
- Grupo Desportivo Casa do Povo de Alfundão
- Grupo Desportivo Casa do Povo de Beringel (Trigaches)
- Grupo Desportivo Casa do Povo de Safara
- Grupo Desportivo da Casa do Povo de S. Luís
- Grupo Desportivo do Roxo
- Grupo Desportivo e Cultural Aldeia de Ruins e Olhas
- Grupo Desportivo e Cultural das Neves
- Grupo Desportivo e Cultural do Alcoforado
- Grupo Desportivo e Recreativo de Amoreiras-Gare
- Grupo Desportivo Juvenil Casa do Povo Sª Luzia
- Grupo Desportivo Povoense
- Grupo Desportivo Tribunas
- Instituto Politécnico de Beja
- Mirante – Assoc. Juvenil Cultural Ambiental e Desportiva de Selmes
- Núcleo Sportinguista de Beja
- Núcleo Sportinguista de Moura
- Operário Futebol Clube
- Sociedade Recreativa Aldeia de Ruins
- Sociedade Recreativa Colense
- Unidos Futebol Clube Campo Redondo
- Vila Ruiva Futebol Clube

== District Championships ==
=== Historic champions ===
Seasons	Champions
1924/25	Luso Beja
1925/26	Luso Beja
1926/27	Luso Beja
1927/28	Luso Beja
1928/29	Luso Beja
1929/30	Luso Beja
1930/31	União Beja
1931/32	Luso Beja

Seasons	Champions
1932/33	Luso Beja
1933/34	Luso Beja
1934/35	Luso Beja
1935/36	Luso Beja
1936/37	Luso Beja
1937/38	Luso Beja
1938/39	Luso Beja
1939/40	Luso Beja

Seasons	Champions
1940/41	Luso Beja
1941/42	Luso Beja
1942/43	Luso Beja
1943/44	Luso Beja
1944/45	Luso Beja
1945/46	Luso Beja
1946/47	Moura

=== Divisional champions ===
Seasons	Champions
1947/48	Serpa
1948/49	Aljustrelense
1949/50	Despertar SC
1950/51	Desp. Beja
1951/52	São Domingos
1952/53	São Domingos
1953/54	Aljustrelense
1954/55	São Domingos
1955/56	Despertar SC
1956/57	Serpa
1957/58	Moura
1958/59	Moura
1959/60	Aljustrelense
1960/61	São Domingos
1961/62	Aljustrelense
1962/63	Desp. Beja
1963/64	Aljustrelense
1964/65	Aljustrelense
1965/66	Moura
1966/67	Desp. Beja
1967/68	Desp. Beja
1968/69	Despertar SC
1969/70	Moura

Seasons	Champions
1970/71	Serpa
1971/72	Aljustrelense
1972/73	Moura
1973/74	Odemirense
1974/75	Moura
1975/76	Aljustrelense
1976/77	Serpa
1977/78	Odemirense
1978/79	Sp. Cuba
1979/80	Cabeça Gorda
1980/81	Serpa
1981/82	Despertar SC
1982/83	Desp. Beja
1983/84	Aljustrelense
1984/85	Moura
1985/86	Piense
1986/87	Piense
1987/88	Ferreirense
1988/89	Desp. Beja
1989/90	Aljustrelense
1990/91	Ferreirense
1991/92	Castrense
1992/93	Aldenovense

Seasons	Champions
1993/94	Serpa
1994/95	Odemirense
1995/96	Cabeça Gorda
1996/97	Ourique
1997/98	Serpa
1998/99	Aljustrelense
1999/00	Castrense
2000/01	Aldenovense
2001/02	Ferreirense
2002/03	Moura
2003/04	Aljustrelense
2004/05	Castrense
2005/06	Serpa
2006/07	Aljustrelense
2007/08	Castrense
2008/09	Moura
2009/10	Odemirense
2010/11	Despertar SC
2011/12	Castrense
2012/13	Almodôvar
2013/14	Aljustrelense
2014/15	Castrense
2015/16	Aljustrelense
2016/17	Castrense

== List of member clubs ==
Abbreviation	Settlement	Official Name	Division (tier)	Cup	Other information
Aldenovense	Vila Nova de S. Bento	Clube Atlético Aldenovense	Distritais (5)	*	
Aljustrelense	Aljustrel	Sport Clube Mineiro Aljustrelense	Terceira Divisão (4)	* *	
Almodôvar	Almodôvar	Clube Desportivo Almodovar	Distritais (5)	None	
Alvorada	Ervidel	Alvorada Futebol Clube	Distritais (6)	None	
Amarelejense	Amareleja	Grupo Desportivo Amarelejense	Distritais (6)	None	
Bairro da Conceição	Beja	Centro de Cultura e Desporto do Bairro Nª Sª da Conceição	Distritais (6)	None	
Barrancos FC	Barrancos	Barrancos Futebol Clube	Distritais (6)	None	
Cabeça Gorda	Cabeça Gorda, Beja	Clube Recreativo e Desportivo de Cabeça Gorda	Distritais (6)	*	
Castrense	Castro Verde	Futebol Clube Castrense	Distritais (5)	* *	
CF Vasco da Gama	Vidigueira	Clube de Futebol Vasco da Gama	Distritais (5)	*	
Desp. Beja	Beja	Clube Desportivo de Beja	Distritais (5)	* *	
Despertar SC	Beja	Despertar Sporting Clube	Terceira Divisão (4)	*	
Entradense	Entradas	Sociedade Recreativa e Desportiva Entradense	Distritais (F)	None	
Ferreirense	Ferreira do Alentejo	Sporting Clube Ferreirense	Distritais (5)	*	
GDC Alvito	Alvito	Grupo Desportivo Cultural Alvito	Distritais (F)	None	
Guadiana	Mértola	Clube de Futebol Guadiana	Distritais (5)	None	
Juv. Boavista	Boavista dos Pinheiros	Juventude Futebol Clube Boavista	Distritais (F)	None	
Messejanense	Messejana	Grupo Desportivo Messejanense	Distritais (6)	None	
Moura	Moura	Moura Atlético Clube	Segunda Divisão (3)	* *	
Negrilhos	Montes Velhos	Negrilhos Futebol Clube	Distritais (6)	None	
Odemirense	Odemira	Sport Clube Odemirense	Distritais (5)	*	
Ourique	Ourique	Ourique Desportos Clube	Distritais (6)	*	
Panóias	Panóias, Beja	Clube Desportivo e Cultural de Panóias	Distritais (5)	None	
Piense	Pias	Piense Sporting Clube	Distritais (6)	*	
Praia Milfontes	Vila Nova de Milfontes	Clube Desportivo Praia de Milfontes	Distritais (5)	None	
Renascente S.Teotónio	São Teotónio	Grupo Desportivo Renascente de São Teotónio	Distritais (6)	None	
Rosairense	Rosário, Almodôvar	Associação Juventude Desportiva Rosairense	Distritais (5)	None	
Sabóia AC	Sabóia, Odemira	Sabóia Atlético Clube	Distritais (6)	None	
Sanluizense	São Luís, Odemira	Sociedade Recreativa e Musical Sanluizense	Distritais (6)	None	
São Domingos	Mina São Domingos, Mértola	São Domingos Futebol Clube	Distritais (F)	None	
São Marcos	São Marcos da Ataboeira	Futebol Clube de São Marcos	Distritais (5)	*	
Serpa	Serpa	Futebol Clube de Serpa	Distritais (5)	* *	
Sp. Cuba	Cuba, Beja	Sporting Clube de Cuba	Distritais (5)	*	
Stª Clara-a-Nova	Santa Clara-a-Nova	Associação Cultural e Desportiva de Santa Clara-a-Nova	Distritais (F)	None	
Vale de Vargo	Vale de Vargo	Futebol Clube de Vale de Vargo	Distritais (6)	None	

Footnote

- 1-10 games in Portuguese Cup. *
- 11-100 games in Portuguese Cup. * *
- 101+ games in Portuguese Cup. * * *

== See also ==
- Portuguese District Football Associations
- Portuguese football competitions
- List of football clubs in Portugal
