= Luzianes-Gare =

- Civil parish
- Location in Portugal
- Coordinates: 37.589°N 8.491°W
- Country: Portugal
- Region: Alentejo
- Intermunic. comm.: Alentejo Litoral
- District: Beja
- Municipality: Odemira

Area
  - Total: 94.36 km^{2} (36.43 sq mi)

Population (2011)
  - Total: 429
  - Density: 4.5/km^{2} (12/sq mi)
- Time zone: UTC+00:00 (WET)
  - Summer (DST): UTC+01:00 (WEST)

Luzianes-Gare is a Portuguese parish in the municipality of Odemira. The population in 2011 was 429, in an area of 94.36 km^{2}.
