= Vale de Santiago =

- Civil parish
- Location in Portugal
- Coordinates: 37.751°N 8.414°W
- Country: Portugal
- Region: Alentejo
- Intermunic. comm.: Alentejo Litoral
- District: Beja
- Municipality: Odemira

Area
  - Total: 112.21 km^{2} (43.32 sq mi)

Population (2011)
  - Total: 1,047
  - Density: 9.3/km^{2} (24/sq mi)
- Time zone: UTC+00:00 (WET)
  - Summer (DST): UTC+01:00 (WEST)

Vale de Santiago is a Portuguese parish in the municipality of Odemira. The population in 2011 was 1,047, in an area of 112.21 km^{2}.
