= Longueira / Almograve =

- Civil parish
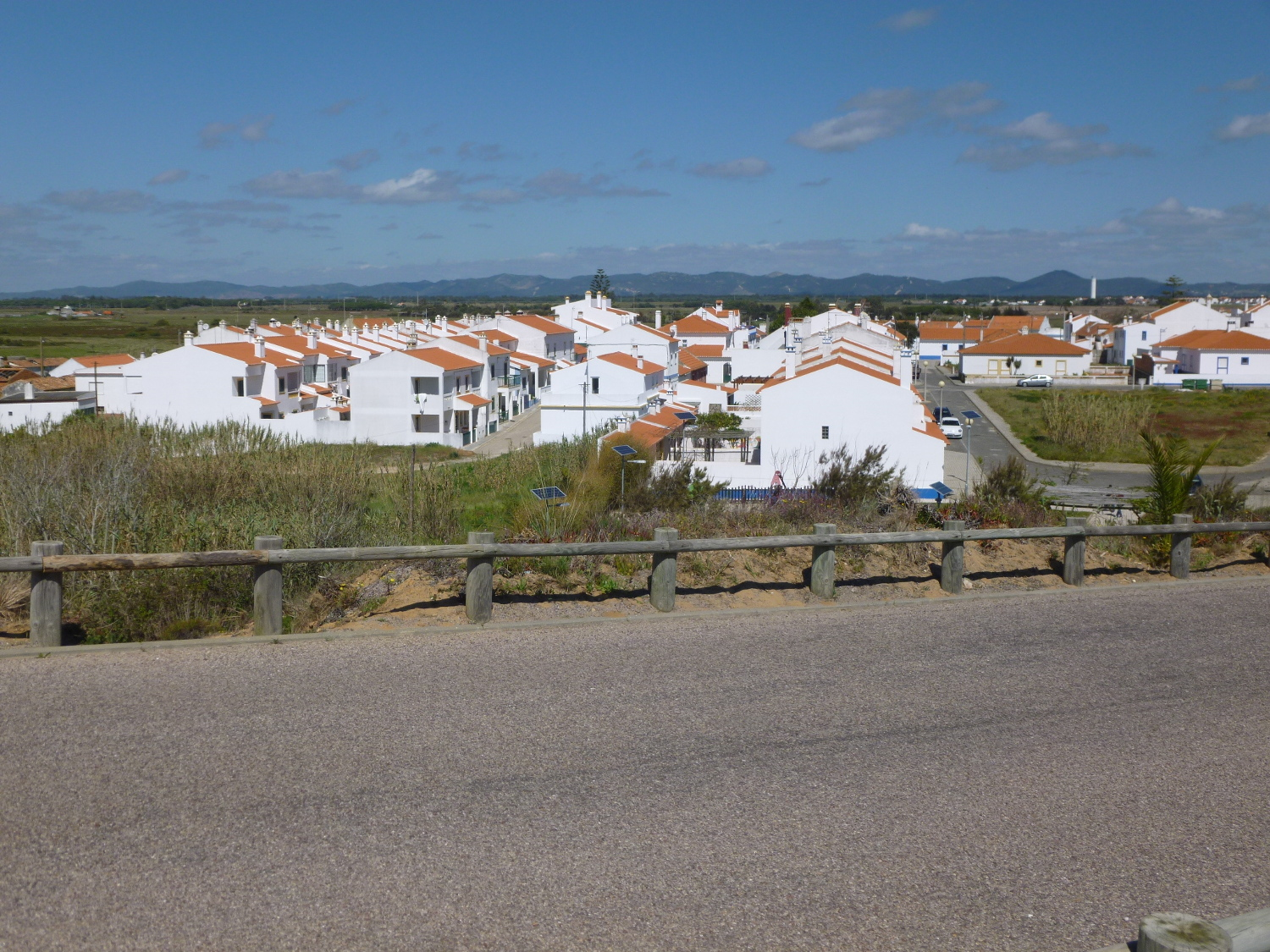

- Location in Portugal
- Coordinates: 37.652°N 8.793°W
- Country: Portugal
- Region: Alentejo
- Intermunic. comm.: Alentejo Litoral
- District: Beja
- Municipality: Odemira

Area
  - Total: 91.69 km^{2} (35.40 sq mi)

Population (2021)
  - Total: 2,238
  - Density: 24.41/km^{2} (63.22/sq mi)
- Time zone: UTC+00:00 (WET)
  - Summer (DST): UTC+01:00 (WEST)

Longueira / Almograve is a Portuguese parish in the municipality of Odemira. As of 2021, the parish has an estimated 2,338 inhabitants in an area of 91.69 km^{2}. With the 2021 census, Longueira / Almograve became the highest growing civil parish in Portugal, with an additional 72.4% from 2011. It was created on June 12, 2001, from the parish of São Salvador.
