= Relíquias (Odemira) =

- Civil parish
- Location in Portugal
- Coordinates: 37.701°N 8.486°W
- Country: Portugal
- Region: Alentejo
- Intermunic. comm.: Alentejo Litoral
- District: Beja
- Municipality: Odemira

Area
  - Total: 120.08 km^{2} (46.36 sq mi)

Population (2011)
  - Total: 931
  - Density: 7.8/km^{2} (20/sq mi)
- Time zone: UTC+00:00 (WET)
  - Summer (DST): UTC+01:00 (WEST)

Relíquias is a Portuguese parish in the municipality of Odemira. The population in 2011 was 931, in an area of 120.08 km^{2}.
