= São Martinho das Amoreiras =

- Civil parish
- Location in Portugal
- Coordinates: 37.715°N 8.665°W
- Country: Portugal
- Region: Alentejo
- Intermunic. comm.: Alentejo Litoral
- District: Beja
- Municipality: Odemira

Area
  - Total: 144.17 km^{2} (55.66 sq mi)

Population (2011)
  - Total: 1,006
  - Density: 7.0/km^{2} (18/sq mi)
- Time zone: UTC+00:00 (WET)
  - Summer (DST): UTC+01:00 (WEST)

São Martinho das Amoreiras is a Portuguese parish in the municipality of Odemira. The population in 2011 was 1,006, in an area of 144.17 km^{2}.
