= Santa Clara-a-Velha =

- Civil parish
- Location in Portugal
- Coordinates: 37.513°N 8.476°W
- Country: Portugal
- Region: Alentejo
- Intermunic. comm.: Alentejo Litoral
- District: Beja
- Municipality: Odemira

Area
  - Total: 163.67 km^{2} (63.19 sq mi)

Population (2011)
  - Total: 873
  - Density: 5.3/km^{2} (14/sq mi)
- Time zone: UTC+00:00 (WET)
  - Summer (DST): UTC+01:00 (WEST)

Santa Clara-a-Velha is a civil parish in the municipality of Odemira, Portugal. The population in 2011 was 873, in an area of 163.67 km^{2}. It was formed in 2013 by the merger of the former parishes Santa Clara-a-Velha and Pereiras-Gare. The dam of Santa Clara (Barragem de Santa Clara), one of the largest dams in Europe, is located here.
