= Cercal do Alentejo =

- Civil parish
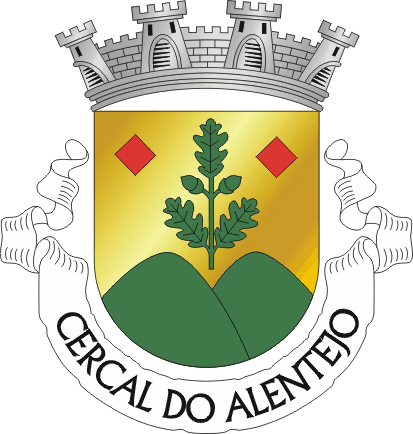
- Coat of arms

- Location in Portugal
- Coordinates: 37.80°N 8.67°W
- Country: Portugal
- Region: Alentejo
- Intermunic. comm.: Alentejo Litoral
- District: Setúbal
- Municipality: Santiago do Cacém

Area
  - Total: 137.49 km^{2} (53.09 sq mi)

Population (2011)
  - Total: 3,362
  - Density: 24/km^{2} (63/sq mi)
- Time zone: UTC+00:00 (WET)
  - Summer (DST): UTC+01:00 (WEST)

Cercal do Alentejo is a parish in the municipality of Santiago do Cacém, Portugal. The population in 2011 was 3,362, in an area of 137.49 km².

It was a municipality seat between 1836 and 1855. It comprises the towns of Cercal, Colos and Vila Nova de Milfontes. Its population in 1849 was 3,255.

It was raised to the status of a town on 20 June 1991 and its name was changed from Cercal to Cercal do Alentejo.

Being located within 15 miles of the beaches of the Alentejo coast, it has a temperate climate which gives it one of the most diverse fauna and flora in Southwest Alentejo.
