= Santa Cruz (Almodôvar) =

- Civil parish
- Location in Portugal
- Coordinates: 37.441°N 7.918°W
- Country: Portugal
- Region: Alentejo
- Intermunic. comm.: Baixo Alentejo
- District: Beja
- Municipality: Almodôvar

Area
  - Total: 123.38 km^{2} (47.64 sq mi)

Population (2011)
  - Total: 651
  - Density: 5.28/km^{2} (13.7/sq mi)
- Time zone: UTC+00:00 (WET)
  - Summer (DST): UTC+01:00 (WEST)

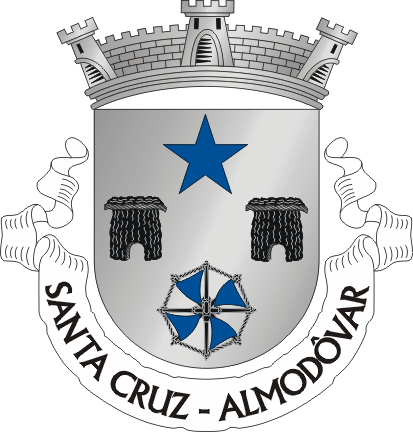

Santa Cruz is a civil parish contained in the municipality of Almodôvar, Portugal. The population in 2011 was 651, in an area of 123.38 km^{2}.
