= Castle of Ourique =

Portuguese medieval castle

- Castelo de Ourique
- Beja, Baixo Alentejo, Alentejo in Portugal

Site information
- Type: Castle
- Owner: Portuguese Republic
- Open to the public: Public

Location
- Coordinates: 37.654176°N 8.226263°W

Site history
- Materials: Masonry

The Castle of Ourique (Portuguese: Castelo de Ourique), is a Portuguese medieval castle in civil parish of Ourique, in the municipality of the same name, in the district of Beja.

== History ==
The castle is linked to the legendary battle of 1139, wherein D. Afonso Henriques defeated a superior Moorish army. In reality, there is still some doubt where the event occurred, even as it was fundamental to the history of an independent Kingdom of Portugal, but not to the history of the castle.

Between the 13th and 14th century, the castle was rebuilt by order of King D. Dinis, possibly over an ancient Romanized castro, later occupied by the Moors. The castle then began to pertain to the Order of São Tiago. Within the nucleus of the historic village are a set of 21 medieval silos (from relatively uncertain chronology), dating to the 14th century. From the estate salvaged by Manuel Maia in 1995, the early Medieval and Modern ceramics stand out, identifying a stratified testimony of the settlement until the 18th century.

The castle and settlement received its first Foral (charter) on 8 January 1290.

A new foral was issued in 1510 by King D. Manuel I.

In the second half of the 20th century, the remaining sections were "restored" and a portion of the wall served as a base for a viewpoint that still crowns the highest point of the village. In 1960, a tank was constructed using a line of walls and a platform to establish a reservoir and garden.

On 16 March 1973, there was a proposal by the Secretaria de Estado da Instrução e Cultura (Secretary-of-State for Instruction and Culture) to classify the site, which was later supported by the Junta Nacional de Educação (National Junta for Education) who suggested classifying it as an Imóvel de Interesse Público (Property of Public Interest). It was supported on 30 May 1973. But, on 3 May 2010, there was a proposal to closed the process by the DRCAlentejo, due to the "disappearance" of the property. It was also supported on 23 November 2011 by the SPAA of National Council of Culture, who archived the process the director of IGESPAR. On 14 September 2012, there was an announcement (13417/2012, Diário da República, Série 2, 179) to archive the classification process, owing to the impossibility of discovering any wall that could limit the viewpoint or walls. This resulted in the beginning of archaeological work to confirm the existence of vestiges on site.

== Architecture ==
The remains of the castle are located on an isolated hillock. The remains of the castle are implanted on an area of the hill, 245 metres (804 ft) altitude, dominated by a vast plain of the Campo de Ourique, between the ravines of Castanheiros and Cotovio, at a confluence 4 kilometres (2.5 mi) north of the parish settlement, alongside the parochial church.

The military architecture consisted of a fort/citadel and fortification wall that encircled the settlement of Ourique. Practically demolished in the 1960s, little vestiges remain of the line of walls or support structures. Unfortunately, the remains today are scarce and adulterated: they do not allow for any rigorous study of possible constructive phases.

Of the original structure, there is very little that can be inferred; its Gothic nature and oval plan fortifications included tower and main door, but little remains. The castle had a relatively heterodox characteristics, in comparison to other Gothic prototypes. Today, where there must have been a medieval tower is a quadrangular water reservoir. Along the old fence, covered with recent stone material, is the border of the town lookout, topped by a wall built of concrete and fenestrated by a frieze, typical of public works constructed during the 2nd Republic. The access to this space is through a small pointed arch, probably echoing the previous structure: it was erected as a variation of the medieval theme.
