= Boavista dos Pinheiros =

- Civil parish
- Location in Portugal
- Coordinates: 37.580°N 8.666°W
- Country: Portugal
- Region: Alentejo
- Intermunic. comm.: Alentejo Litoral
- District: Beja
- Municipality: Odemira

Area
  - Total: 37.85 km^{2} (14.61 sq mi)

Population (2011)
  - Total: 1,633
  - Density: 43/km^{2} (110/sq mi)
- Time zone: UTC+00:00 (WET)
  - Summer (DST): UTC+01:00 (WEST)

Boavista dos Pinheiros is a parish in Portugal, located in the municipality of Odemira. The population in 2011 was 1,633, in an area of 37.85 km^{2}. The main economic activities are agriculture and forestry.
