= São Teotónio =

- Civil parish
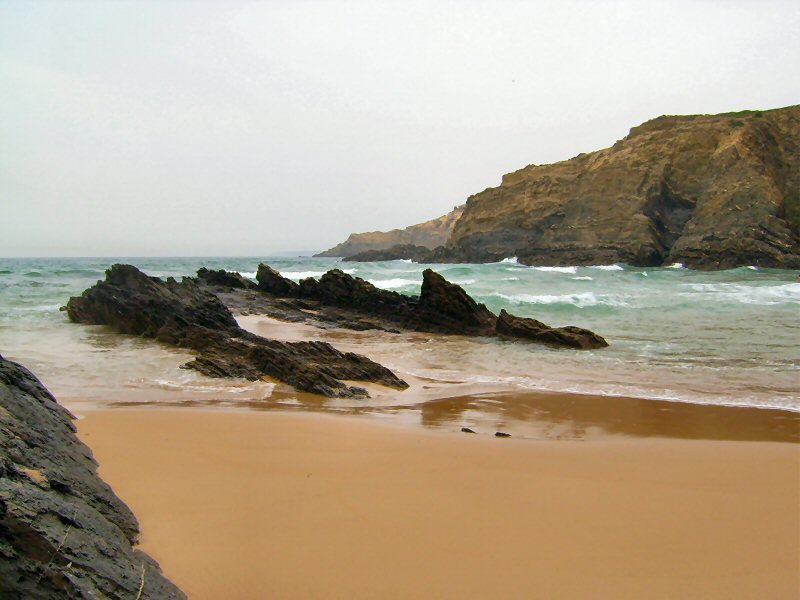

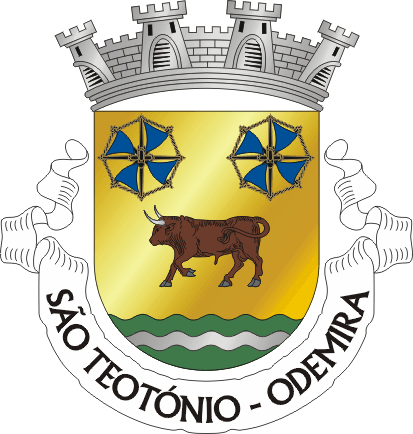
- Coat of arms

- Location in Portugal
- Coordinates: 37.509°N 8.705°W
- Country: Portugal
- Region: Alentejo
- Intermunic. comm.: Alentejo Litoral
- District: Beja
- Municipality: Odemira

Area
  - Total: 347.25 km^{2} (134.07 sq mi)

Population (2011)
  - Total: 6,439
  - Density: 18.54/km^{2} (48.03/sq mi)
- Time zone: UTC+00:00 (WET)
  - Summer (DST): UTC+01:00 (WEST)

São Teotónio is a civil parish in the municipality of Odemira, Portugal. The population in 2011 was 6,439, in an area of 347.25 km^{2}. In 2013 the former parish Zambujeira do Mar merged into the existing parish of São Teotónio.
