= Zambujeira do Mar =

- Civil parish
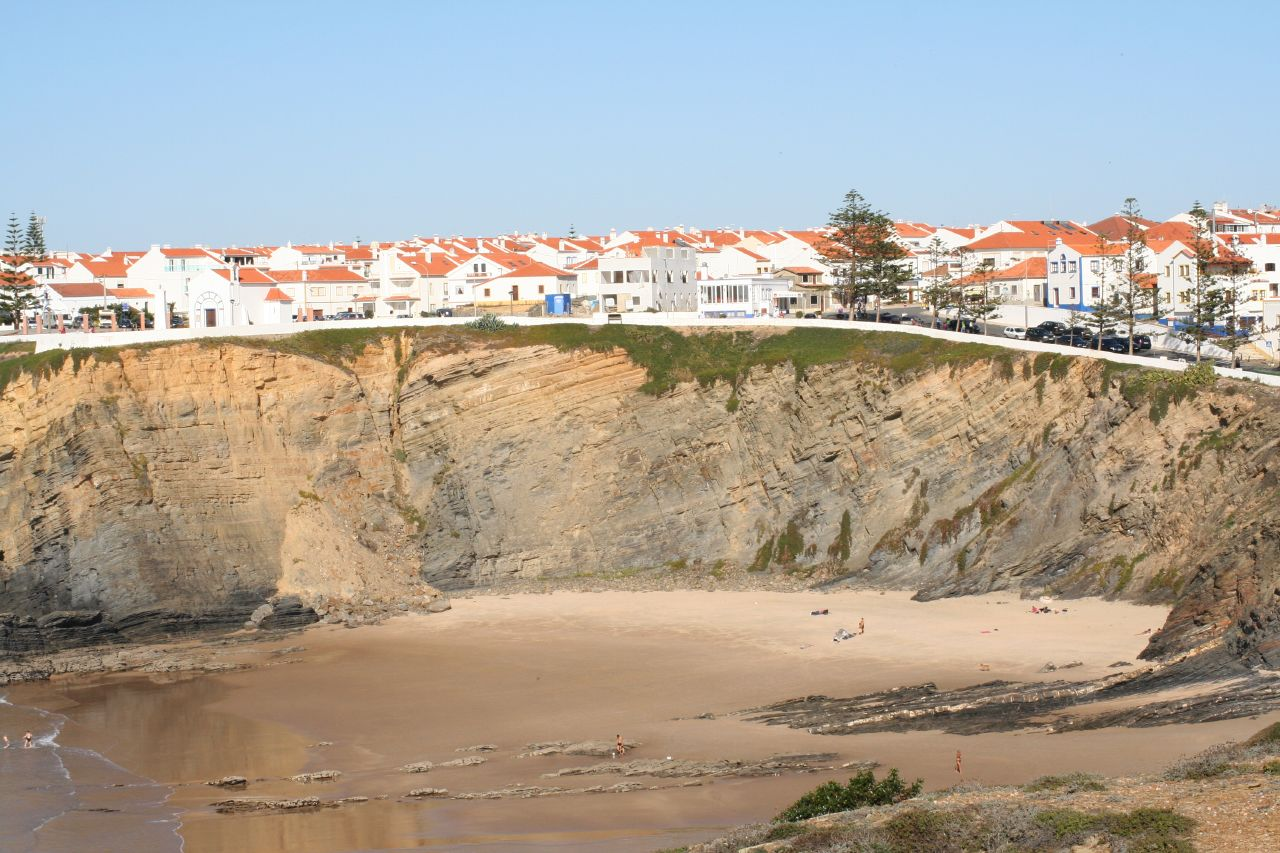
- An image of the main settlement of Zambujeira do Mar, a clifftop grouping of residences and commerce

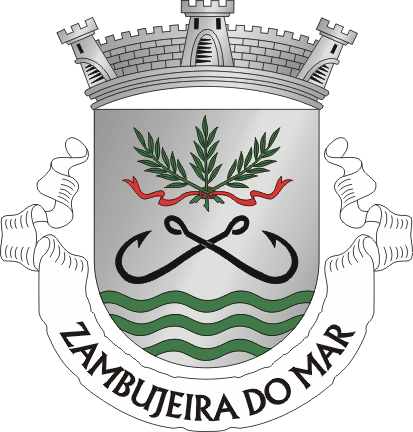
- Coat of arms
- Interactive map of Zambujeira do Mar
- Coordinates: 37°31′31″N 8°47′03″W
- Country: Portugal
- Region: Alentejo
- Subregion: Alentejo Litoral
- District: Beja
- Municipality: Odemira
- Localities: Alpenduradas, Bencaniz, Carvalhal da Rocha, Daroeira, Entrada da Barca, Sardanito, Touril, Valas, Vale Figueira

Area
  - Total: 40.975 km^{2} (15.821 sq mi)

Population (2011)
  - Total: 911
  - Density: 22.2/km^{2} (57.6/sq mi)
- Time zone: UTC0 (WET)
  - Summer (DST): UTC+1 (WEST)
- Postal zone: 7630-801
- Area code: (+351) 283 XX XX XX
- Demonym: Zambujeirense
- Patron saint: Nossa Senhora do Mar
- Geographic detail from CAOP (2010) produced by Instituto Geográfico Português (IGP)

Zambujeira do Mar is a former civil parish in the municipality of Odemira, Alentejo region, Portugal. In 2013, the parish merged into the parish São Teotónio. Odemira Municipality in the Portuguese. It has a population of 911 inhabitants, dispersed over an area of 42.96 square kilometres (16.59 mi^{2}).

== History ==
The most recent civil parish established in Odemira, Zambujeira do Mar was deannexed from the neighbouring civil parish of São Teotónio on 30 June 1989. It merged back into São Teotónio in 2013.

== Geography ==
As its name implies, Zambujeira do Mar is located along the western coast of the Alentejo, south of Cabo Sardão, an area cut by various valleys, cliffs and faults, interspersed by small beaches consisting of clear fine sands, such as Zambujeira, Alteirinhos, Nossa Senhora e Tonel. The coast of Zambujeira is included within the Nature Park of the Southwest Alentejo and St. Vincent Coast (Parque Natural do Sudoeste Alentejano e Costa Vicentina), covering the various folding clifftops and small beaches/coves of the coast. In addition to the central coastal beach of Zambujeira, the beaches of Alteirinhos, Nossa Senhora, Arquinha and Tonel are geologically significant, as well as attracting summer tourists and vacationers.

=== Climate ===
Zambujeira do Mar has a Mediterranean climate with warm dry summers and mild wet winters. Though close to the ocean, the civil parish is not as exposed to the sea as other neighboring towns in the coast are and, as a result, temperatures are much more continentalized. Winters are cooler at night, averaging 6 °C (43 °F) minima in January, and summers are warmer at daytime, averaging around 25 °C (77 °F) maxima in July, August and September.

There are no climate monitoring stations at Zambujeira, but two stations from IPMA are located at about 5 km (3.1 mi) from the ocean, close to Zambujeira, one in Daroeiras and the other one close to the MEO Sudoeste music festival. Climate normals for the former are expressed in the climate box below:

Climate data for Zambujeira do Mar (Daroeiras), altitude: 106 m (348 ft) (1991–2020 normals, 1981-present extremes)
Month	Jan	Feb	Mar	Apr	May	Jun	Jul	Aug	Sep	Oct	Nov	Dec	Year
Record high °C (°F)	23.1 (73.6)	27.0 (80.6)	29.5 (85.1)	32.1 (89.8)	36.6 (97.9)	39.3 (102.7)	42.0 (107.6)	42.8 (109.0)	41.1 (106.0)	36.9 (98.4)	29.0 (84.2)	24.9 (76.8)	42.8 (109.0)
Mean daily maximum °C (°F)	15.8 (60.4)	16.6 (61.9)	18.7 (65.7)	19.8 (67.6)	22.3 (72.1)	24.7 (76.5)	26.1 (79.0)	26.6 (79.9)	25.7 (78.3)	23.3 (73.9)	19.0 (66.2)	16.8 (62.2)	21.3 (70.3)
Daily mean °C (°F)	10.5 (50.9)	10.9 (51.6)	12.8 (55.0)	14.2 (57.6)	16.5 (61.7)	18.7 (65.7)	19.9 (67.8)	20.2 (68.4)	19.3 (66.7)	17.5 (63.5)	13.7 (56.7)	11.6 (52.9)	15.5 (59.9)
Mean daily minimum °C (°F)	5.2 (41.4)	5.3 (41.5)	7.0 (44.6)	8.7 (47.7)	10.6 (51.1)	12.7 (54.9)	13.7 (56.7)	13.8 (56.8)	12.9 (55.2)	11.6 (52.9)	8.4 (47.1)	6.4 (43.5)	9.7 (49.4)
Record low °C (°F)	−6.0 (21.2)	−4.9 (23.2)	−2.5 (27.5)	−1.0 (30.2)	2.3 (36.1)	4.5 (40.1)	5.6 (42.1)	6.5 (43.7)	3.9 (39.0)	0.6 (33.1)	−4.5 (23.9)	−4.5 (23.9)	−6.0 (21.2)
Average precipitation mm (inches)	68.5 (2.70)	52.4 (2.06)	53.8 (2.12)	59.1 (2.33)	35.0 (1.38)	8.1 (0.32)	1.8 (0.07)	3.2 (0.13)	27.9 (1.10)	81.1 (3.19)	84.5 (3.33)	92.3 (3.63)	567.6 (22.35)
Average precipitation days (≥ 1 mm)	8.5	7.3	7.2	7.6	5.2	1.3	0.4	0.5	3.3	7.7	9.2	9.7	67.9
Source: Instituto Português do Mar e da Atmosfera

== Economy ==
The principal activity in the parish is tourism, although agriculture, cattle breeding and fishing are common activities for the industrial sectors of the economy. There are four ports along the coast that shelter the fishery ships in the area called Entradas da Barca. By the last half of the 20th century, rural tourism began to punctuate some of the areas of the parish, concentrated on providing quality leisure services associated with rural/farm activities.

== Architecture ==
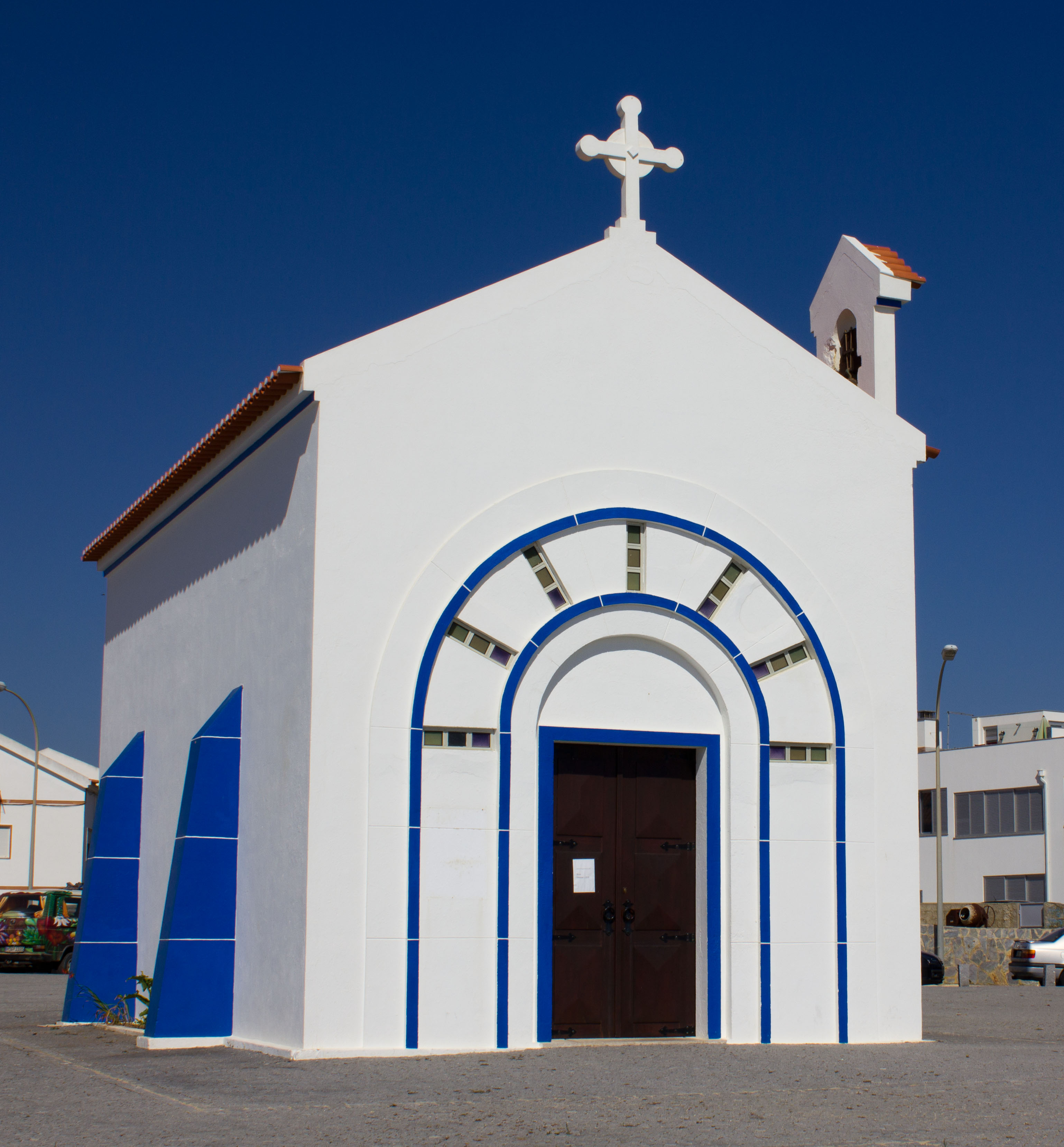
Chapel of Nossa Senhora do Mar, the white-washed simple nave temple dedicated to Our Lady of the Sea

Visitors to the parish, apart from the beaches, can visit many of the architecturally significant buildings in the region, including the square of the Chapel of Nossa Senhora do Mar, and the historical fountains of Amores and Santa Catarina.

== Culture ==
August is the primary period of cultural activities for the parish, and includes: the summer music Festival do Sudoeste starting on first Thursday of the month (situated some kilometres from the centre); on 15 August, are the religious festivals of the region, dedicated the patron saint Nossa Senhora do Mar (Our Lady of the Sea); finally, on 29 August is annual fair.

The popular event Festival Sudoeste (or simply the Southwest Festival), is one of the biggest summer music festivals in Portugal. During the four-day event, both national and international bands present concerts through the day and evening, without stopping, supported by world-renowned DJs. Past performers to this event have included many names from the world of indie and rock music including Marilyn Manson, Oasis, Ben Harper, Muse, Fatboy Slim, Doves, Basement Jaxx, and Black Uhuru.

Two organizations have been identified, the Associação Cultural e Recreativa Zambujeirense (Zambujeiran Cultural and Recreation Association) and Associação de Solidariedade Social de Zambujeira do Mar (Association of Social Solidarity of Zambujeira do Mar) which promote recreational, cultural and sporting activities in the community.
