= Odemira =

- Municipality
- Town of Odemira
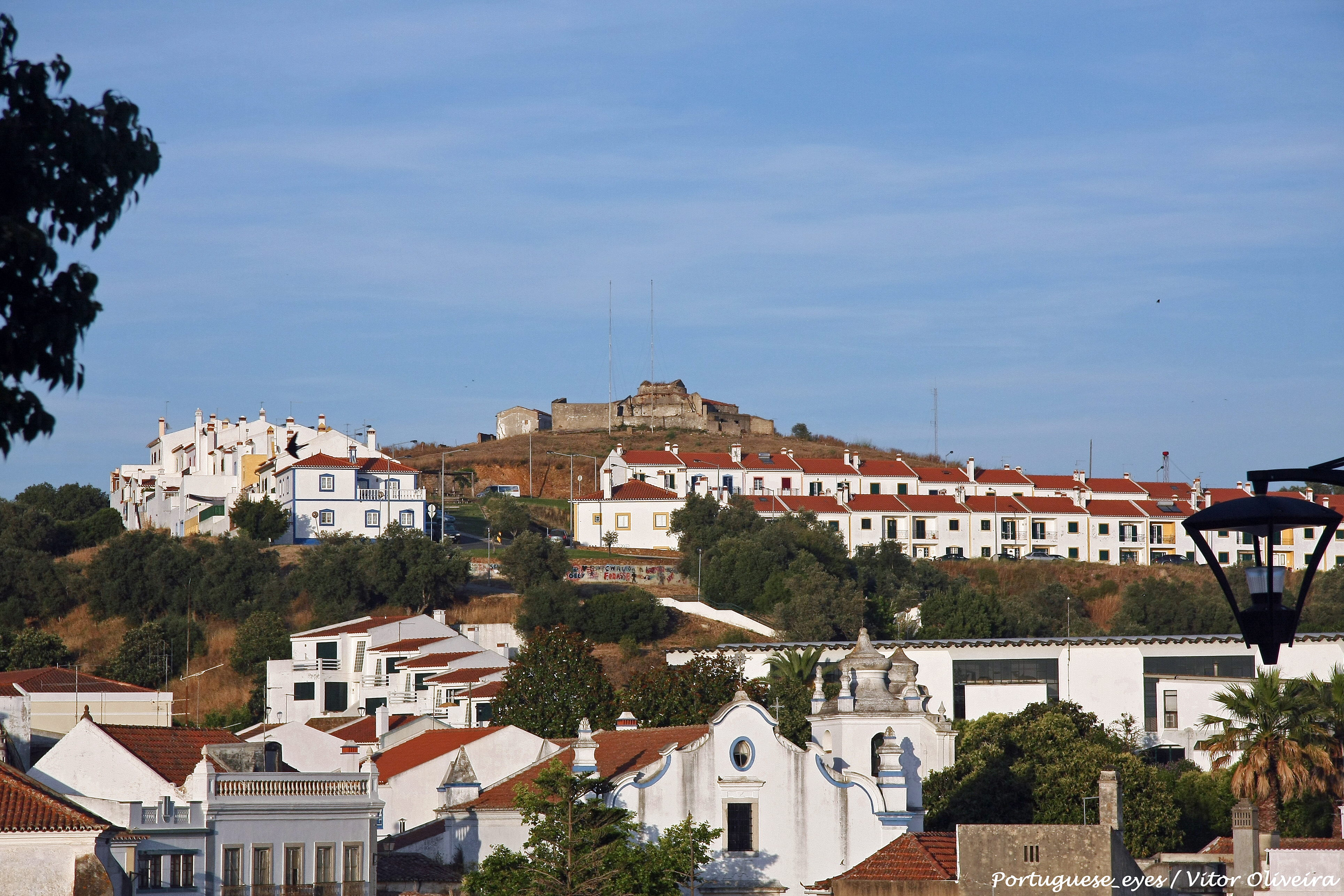
- View of Odemira

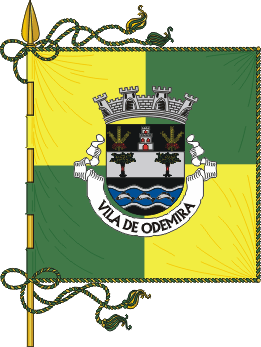
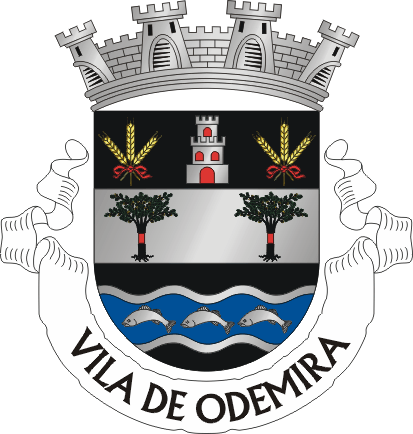
- Flag Coat of arms
- Interactive map of Odemira
- Coordinates: 37°35′N 8°38′W
- Country: Portugal
- Region: Alentejo
- Intermunic. comm.: Alentejo Litoral
- District: Beja
- Parishes: 13

Government
  - President: Hélder António Guerreiro (PS)

Area
  - Total: 1,720.60 km^{2} (664.33 sq mi)

Population (2021)
  - Total: 29,538
  - Density: 17.167/km^{2} (44.463/sq mi)
- Time zone: UTC+00:00 (WET)
  - Summer (DST): UTC+01:00 (WEST)
- Local holiday: 8 September
- Website: www.cm-odemira.pt

Odemira (pronounced [ɔðɨˈmiɾɐ]), officially the Town of Odemira (Portuguese: Vila de Odemira), is a town and a municipality in Beja District in the Portuguese region of Alentejo. The population in 2021 was 29,538, in an area of 1,720.6 square kilometres (664.3 mi^{2}), making it the largest municipality of Portugal by area, but one of the least densely populated.

It is famous for its wild beaches and for being home to a significant immigrant community, comprising 28.2% of the municipality's population as of 2021. The village of Zambujeira do Mar is home to the Festival do Sudoeste, one of the biggest rock festivals in Europe.

The municipality of Odemira has two large economic activities, tourism and export-oriented agriculture. It is home to major operations of national and international agricultural companies such as Driscoll's and Vitacress.

The present mayor is Hélder António Guerreiro, elected by the Socialist Party in 2021. The municipal holiday is 8 September.

== Etymology ==
The first element of the town's name, Odi- (equivalent to Spanish Guadi-), is common in Portuguese placenames and stems from Arabic واد wādin, meaning "river valley" or "gully". The second element's origin is more uncertain, but is presumed to be derived from a pre-Roman toponym, either Celtic or pre-Celtic.

== History ==
The region has been inhabited since ancient times, as evidenced by archaeological remains predating the Roman era. Successive civilizations, including the Romans and later the Muslim states of Al-Andalus, left their mark on the local culture and traditions.

The Christian reconquest of Odemira occurred relatively late, possibly carried out by the Order of Santiago. By 1238, the region was under Christian control. In 1245, the castle of Odemira was donated by Paio Peres Correia, Master of the Order of Santiago, to the Bishop of Porto, Pedro Salvadores.

On 28 March 1256, King Afonso III incorporated Odemira into the Crown and granted it a municipal charter (foral). This charter delineated the boundaries of the municipality and reflected a continuity of administrative practices from the Islamic period. Positioned near the navigable stretch of the Mira River, Odemira became a central hub for a vast surrounding territory, following a territorial model common to many southwestern Iberian settlements.

Under King Dinis, the lordship of Odemira was granted to Manuel Pessanha in 1319, a Genoese admiral instrumental in organizing the Portuguese navy. During the reign of King Afonso IV, Odemira briefly returned to the Order of Santiago before being reincorporated into the Crown in 1352.

In 1357, the castle briefly returns to the Pessanha family, when King Pedro I gave it to Lançarote Pessanha. In 1387, King João I transferred the lordship of Odemira to Lourenço Anes Fogaça, whose descendants maintained control until the late 15th century. In 1446, King Afonso V created the title of Count of Odemira, bestowing it upon Sancho de Noronha.

Odemira received a new foral from King Manuel I in 1510 as part of the widespread administrative reforms of the time. This document emphasized the economic importance of maritime trade, livestock, and local mineral resources.

The title of Count of Odemira became extinct in 1661 when the holdings were incorporated into the House of Cadaval. During the 19th century, liberal reforms redefined the municipality's boundaries, giving it its present configuration.

In 1888, the Linha do Sul railway line reached the Odemira municipality, connecting it to Setúbal and Lisbon to the north and a year later to Algarve to the south. While it did not reach the town of Odemira, three stations were constructed in the east of the municipality: Amoreiras-Odemira in São Martinho das Amoreiras, Luzianes and Santa Clara - Saboia, near the villages of Santa Clara-a-Velha and Sabóia. The arrival of the railways permitted the creation of small population centers around these stations. The station in Luzianes was deactivated in 2012, due to low demand.

During the 1960s and 1970s, the municipality was affected by rural exodus, losing 33% of its population between 1960 and 1981. Since the 1980s, an increase in foreign investment in export focused agricultural production has helped stabilize the municipality's population, and even grow between 2011 and 2021. While the native resident population has gradually decreased, immigration to the municipality has increased since the 1990s. Immigrants came primarily from Eastern Europe in the 1990s and in the 2000s, and since from Thailand, Nepal and India.

== Geography ==
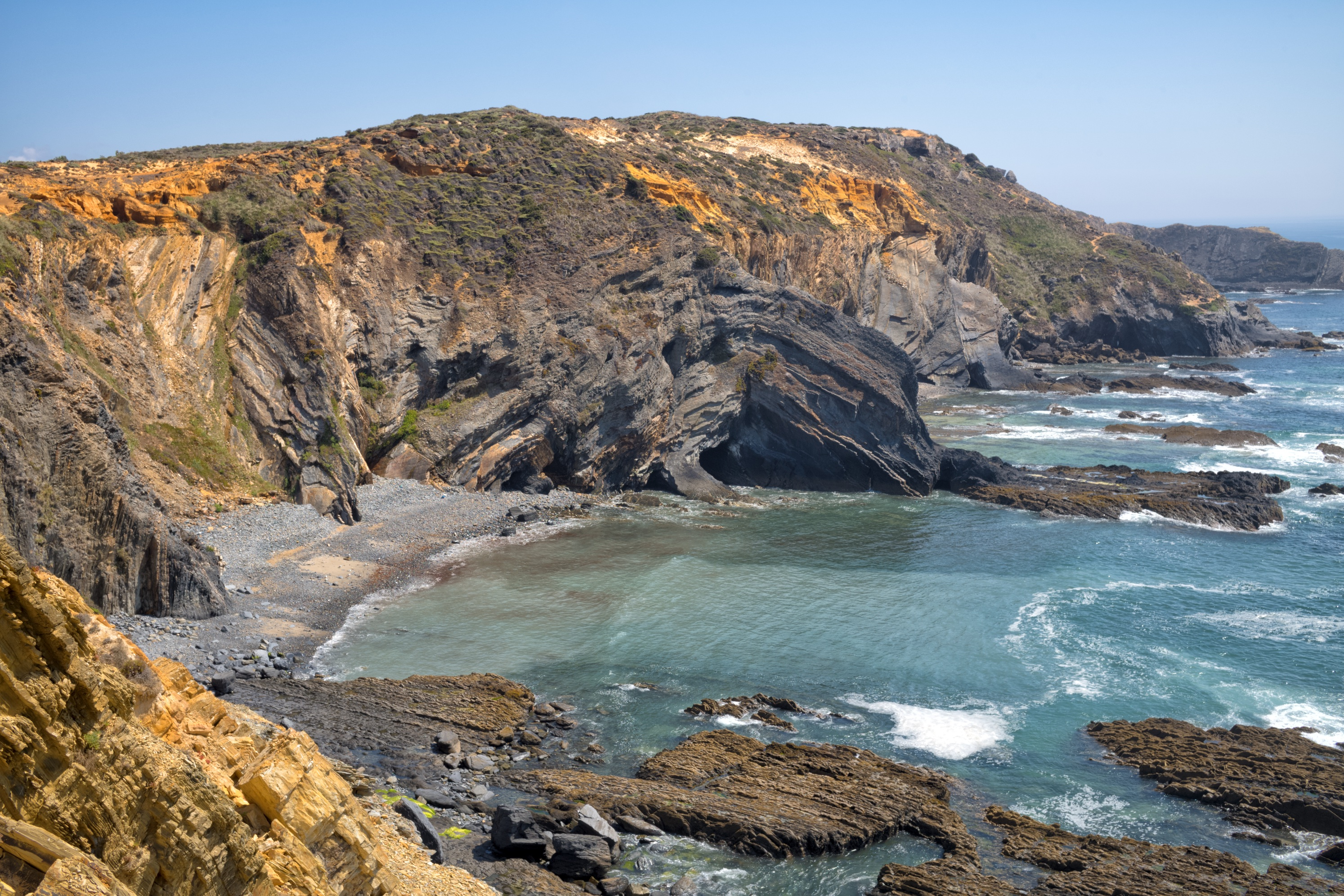
Coast in Zambujeira do Mar, Odemira

The municipality of Odemira is located in southwestern Portugal, bordered by the municipalities of Sines and Santiago do Cacém to the north, Ourique to the east, and the Algarvian municipalities of Aljezur and Monchique to the south.

Its coastline is 55 kilometres (34 mi) long and approximately 44% of its territory is within the Southwest Alentejo and Vicentine Coast Nature Park and the Natura 2000 network.

=== Climate ===
Odemira has a Mediterranean climate. Winters are mild and rainy, with daytime temperatures usually around 16 °C (61 °F) and nighttime lows around 6 °C (43 °F). Summers are dry and sunny and are hot in the interior of the municipality (maxima is around 31 °C (88 °F) bordering Ourique) and warm at the coast (where maxima is around 25 °C (77 °F)).

Climate data for Relíquias, 1980-2010, altitude: 244 m (801 ft)
Month	Jan	Feb	Mar	Apr	May	Jun	Jul	Aug	Sep	Oct	Nov	Dec	Year
Average precipitation mm (inches)	57.1 (2.25)	58.6 (2.31)	46.0 (1.81)	54.1 (2.13)	33.4 (1.31)	10.5 (0.41)	2.0 (0.08)	4.8 (0.19)	19.2 (0.76)	80.4 (3.17)	86.4 (3.40)	79.1 (3.11)	531.6 (20.93)
Source: Portuguese Environment Agency

== Parishes ==
Administratively, the municipality is divided into 13 civil parishes (freguesias):

- Boavista dos Pinheiros
- Colos
- Longueira / Almograve
- Luzianes-Gare
- Relíquias
- Sabóia
- Santa Clara-a-Velha
- São Luís
- São Martinho das Amoreiras
- São Salvador e Santa Maria
- São Teotónio
- Vale de Santiago
- Vila Nova de Milfontes

== Demographics ==
Odemira Municipality's population (1801–2021)
1801	1849	1864	1878	1890	1900	1911	1920	1930	1940	1950	1960	1970	1981	1991	2001	2011	2021
6,390	11,669	17,136	18,098	19,386	20,489	23,883	27,697	32,541	40,513	44,050	43,999	33,235	29,463	26,418	26,106	26,066	29,538
Source: INE

The municipality of Odemira experienced population growth between 2011 and 2021, marking the first such increase since 1950. This trend contrasts with the broader pattern of population decline in much of rural Portugal. The growth has been largely attributed to immigration, which has significantly transformed the municipality's demographic profile.

In 2021, Odemira had the highest proportion of foreign-born residents among all Portuguese municipalities, with 28.2% of its population originating from abroad. This marked a significant rise in the number of foreign residents, increasing from 3,320 in 2014 to 13,843 by 2023. The municipality hosts two distinct groups of immigrants: agricultural workers from Southeast Asia, South Asia, and Eastern Europe, and high-income professionals, such as CEOs, primarily from Germany, the Netherlands and the United Kingdom. Among the immigrant communities, residents from Nepal and India are notably prominent, numbering 2,388 and 1,611, respectively, in 2021.

The influx of immigrants has been driven in part by the growth of agribusiness, which relies heavily on foreign labor. These dynamics are reshaping the social, economic, and cultural fabric of Odemira, aligning it with trends observed in other rural areas engaged with globalized agricultural practices. However, the rapid pace of change has also brought challenges as of 2021, particularly in areas such as housing, education, language classes and cultural integration, where demand has often outstripped local capacity to adapt.

== Economy ==
The local economy is characterized by a dual reliance on tourism and intensive, export-oriented agribusiness. The latter has been a significant driver of economic activity since the 1980s, benefiting from foreign investment and infrastructure such as the Santa Clara Dam and the Mira River Irrigation Perimeter.

Agribusiness in Odemira focuses on the production of vegetables, small fruits, and ornamental flowers, primarily for export. Companies such as Driscoll's and Vitacress have established operations in the municipality, making Odemira a key player in the European berry market. By 2014, Odemira accounted for 90% of Portugal's raspberry production and 50% of raspberry consumption in Europe came from Portugal. These enterprises rely heavily on immigrant labor to sustain operations, reflecting the globalized nature of the local agricultural sector.

Tourism also plays an important role in the local economy, supported by Odemira's natural beauty and protected landscapes. Initiatives such as rural tourism and ecotourism have complemented the municipality's agricultural identity, attracting lifestyle migrants and visitors seeking recreation in a preserved natural environment.

== Transports ==
There are two active railway stations in the Odemira municipality in the Linha do Sul railway line: Amoreiras-Odemira in São Martinho das Amoreiras and Santa Clara - Saboia nearby the villages of Santa Clara-a-Velha and Sabóia. Neither of these stations passes by the town of Odemira, with the Amoreiras-Odemira station located 22.8 kilometres (14.2 mi) northeast of the town of Odemira.

== Notable people ==
- Pedro Damiano (1480–1544) a Portuguese chess player and pharmacist by profession
- Jéssica Silva (born 1994) a footballer
- Pedro de Almada Pereira (1835 in Odemira – 1911) a landowner, schoolmaster and journalist, founder of the periodical O Campo de Ourique

== Gallery ==
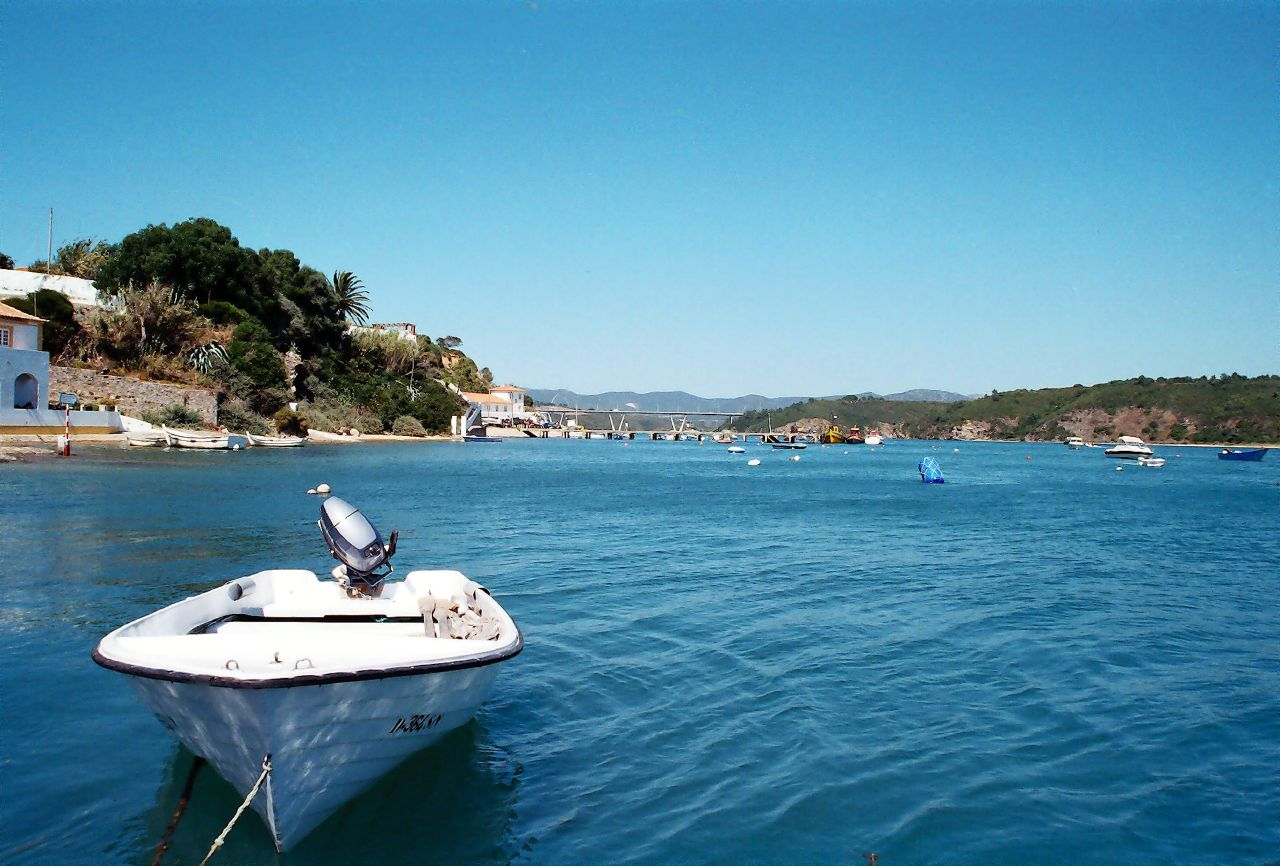
Vila Nova de Milfontes.

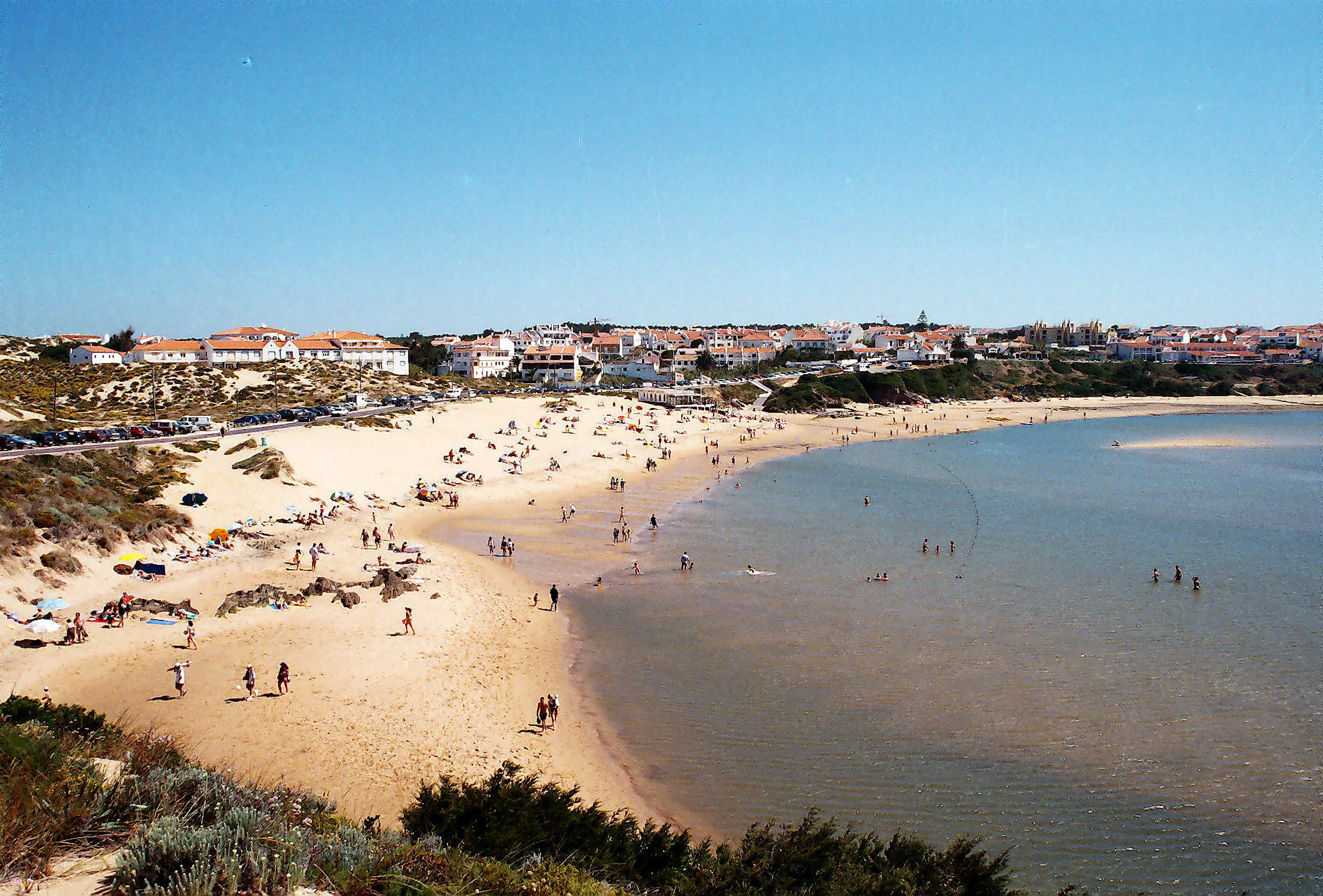
Vila Nova de Milfontes.

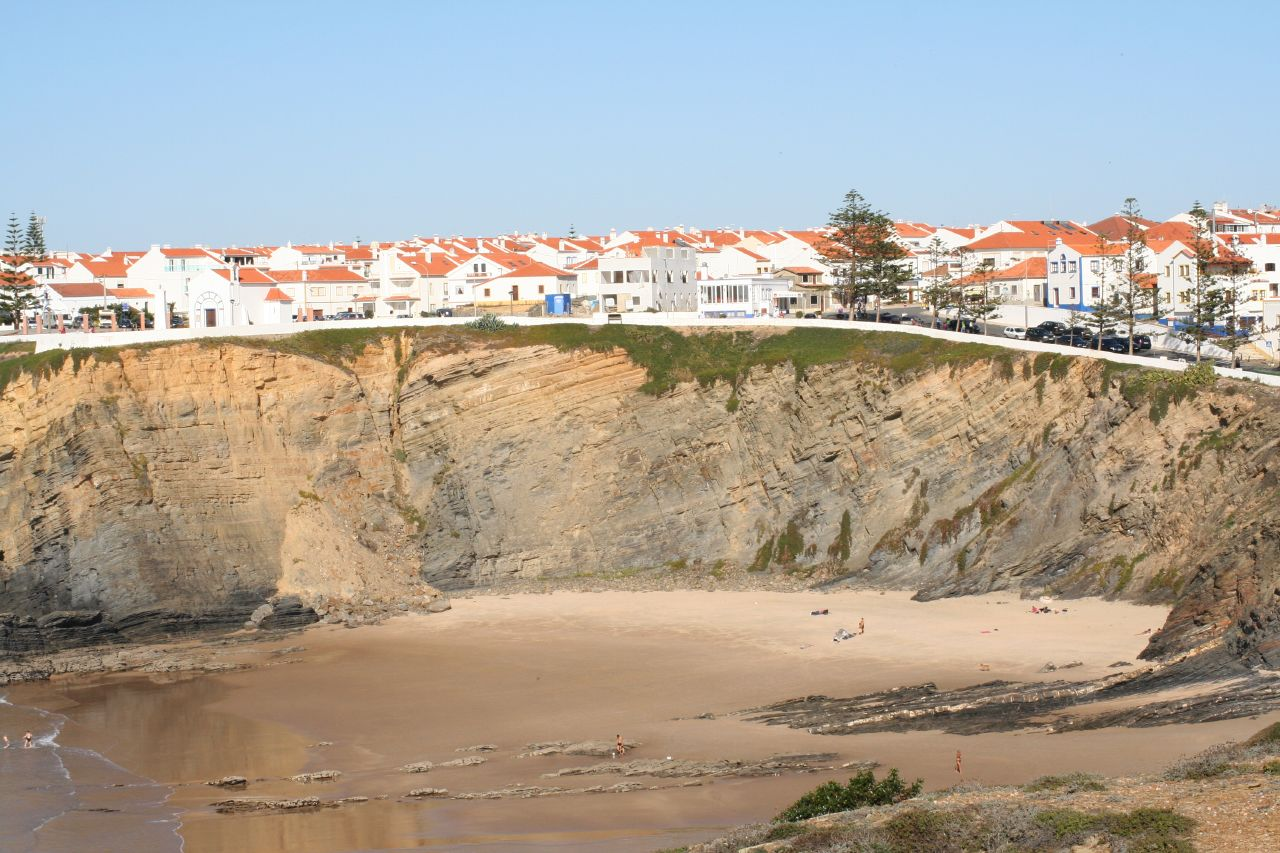
Zambujeira.
