= Santa Clara-a-Nova e Gomes Aires =

- Civil parish
- Location in Portugal
- Coordinates: 37.489°N 8.144°W
- Country: Portugal
- Region: Alentejo
- Intermunic. comm.: Baixo Alentejo
- District: Beja
- Municipality: Almodôvar

Area
  - Total: 173.81 km^{2} (67.11 sq mi)

Population (2011)
  - Total: 955
  - Density: 5.5/km^{2} (14/sq mi)
- Time zone: UTC+00:00 (WET)
  - Summer (DST): UTC+01:00 (WEST)

Santa Clara-a-Nova e Gomes Aires is a civil parish in the municipality of Almodôvar, Portugal. It was formed in 2013 by the merger of the former parishes Santa Clara-a-Nova and Gomes Aires. The population in 2011 was 955, in an area of 173.81 km^{2}.
