= Katchana =

Portuguese footballer

Personal information
- Full name: Ricardo Jorge Guerreiro Felisberto
- Date of birth: 8 October 1983 (age 43)
- Place of birth: Almodôvar, Portugal
- Height: 1.79 m (5 ft 10 1/2 in)
- Position: Midfielder

Youth career
- 1993–1996: Almodôvar
- 1996–1999: Castrense
- 1999–2001: Despertar Beja
- 2001–2002: Louletano

Senior career*
Years	Team	Apps	(Gls)
2002–2004	Castrense		
2004–2005	Aljustrelense		
2006–2007	Beira-Mar	6	(0)
2006	→ Avanca (loan)	4	(0)
2007	→ Pampilhosa (loan)	9	(1)
2007–2009	Aljustrelense	25	(4)
2009–2011	Mafra	45	(6)
2011–2012	APOP	24	(2)
2012–2013	Ayia Napa	6	(0)
2013–2014	Enosis Neon	7	(0)
2014–2016	Águeda	84	(21)
2016–2017	Anadia	28	(7)
2017	Beira-Mar	3	(1)
2017–2018	Pampilhosa	27	(5)
2018–2020	Mourisquense	36	(4)
- * Club domestic league appearances and goals as of 1 August 2020

Ricardo Jorge Guerreiro Felisberto (born 8 October 1983 in Almodôvar, Beja District), known as Katchana, is a Portuguese footballer who played as a midfielder.
