= Alvito, Portugal =

Alvito
- Municipality
- Town of Alvito
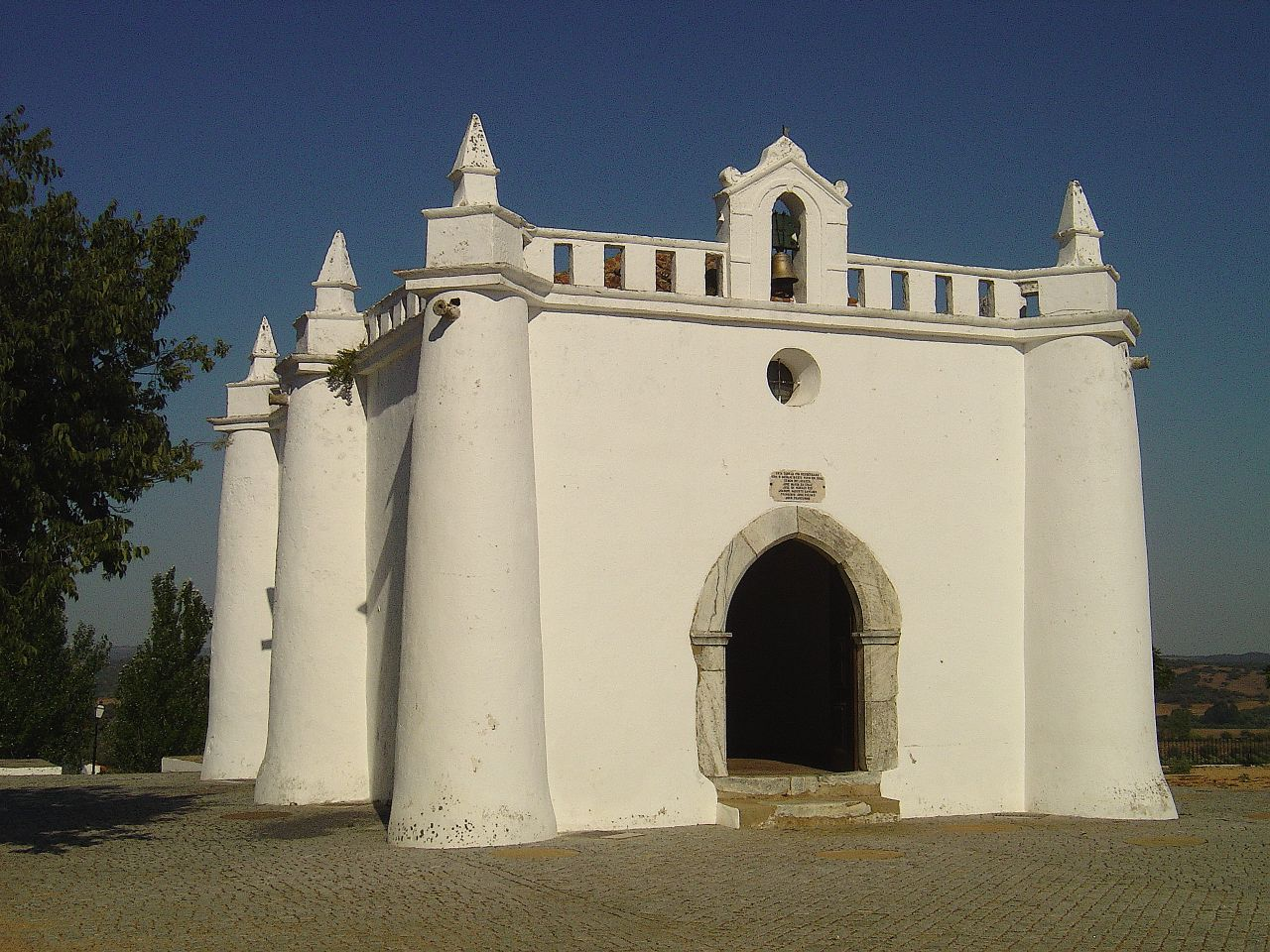
- View of Alvito

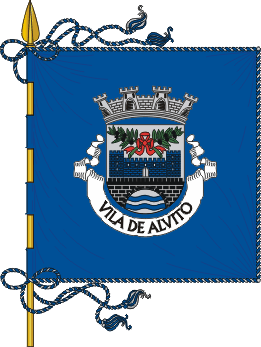
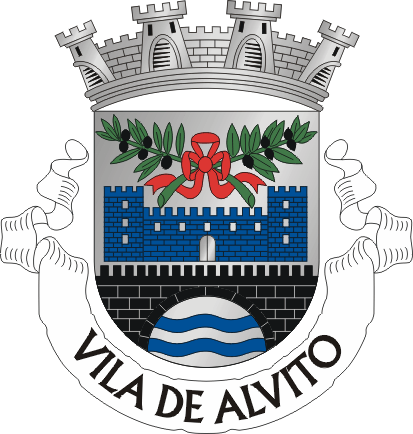
- Flag Coat of arms
- Interactive map of Alvito
- Location in Portugal
- Coordinates: 38°15′N 7°59′W
- Country: Portugal
- Region: Alentejo
- Intermunic. comm.: Baixo Alentejo
- District: Beja
- Parishes: 2

Government
  - President: José Efigénio (Ind.)

Area
  - Total: 264.85 km^{2} (102.26 sq mi)

Population (2011)
  - Total: 2,504
  - Density: 9.454/km^{2} (24.49/sq mi)
- Time zone: UTC+00:00 (WET)
  - Summer (DST): UTC+01:00 (WEST)
- Local holiday: Ascension Day (date varies)
- Website: www.cm-alvito.pt

https://pt.wikipedia.org/wiki/Jo%C3%A3o_Fernandes_da_Silveira

Alvito (Portuguese pronunciation: [alˈvitu]), officially the Town of Alvito (Portuguese: Vila de Alvito), is a municipality in the Beja District of southern Portugal. The population in 2011 was 2,504, in an area of 264.85 km^{2}.

The current president municipal chamber is José Efigénio.

== History ==
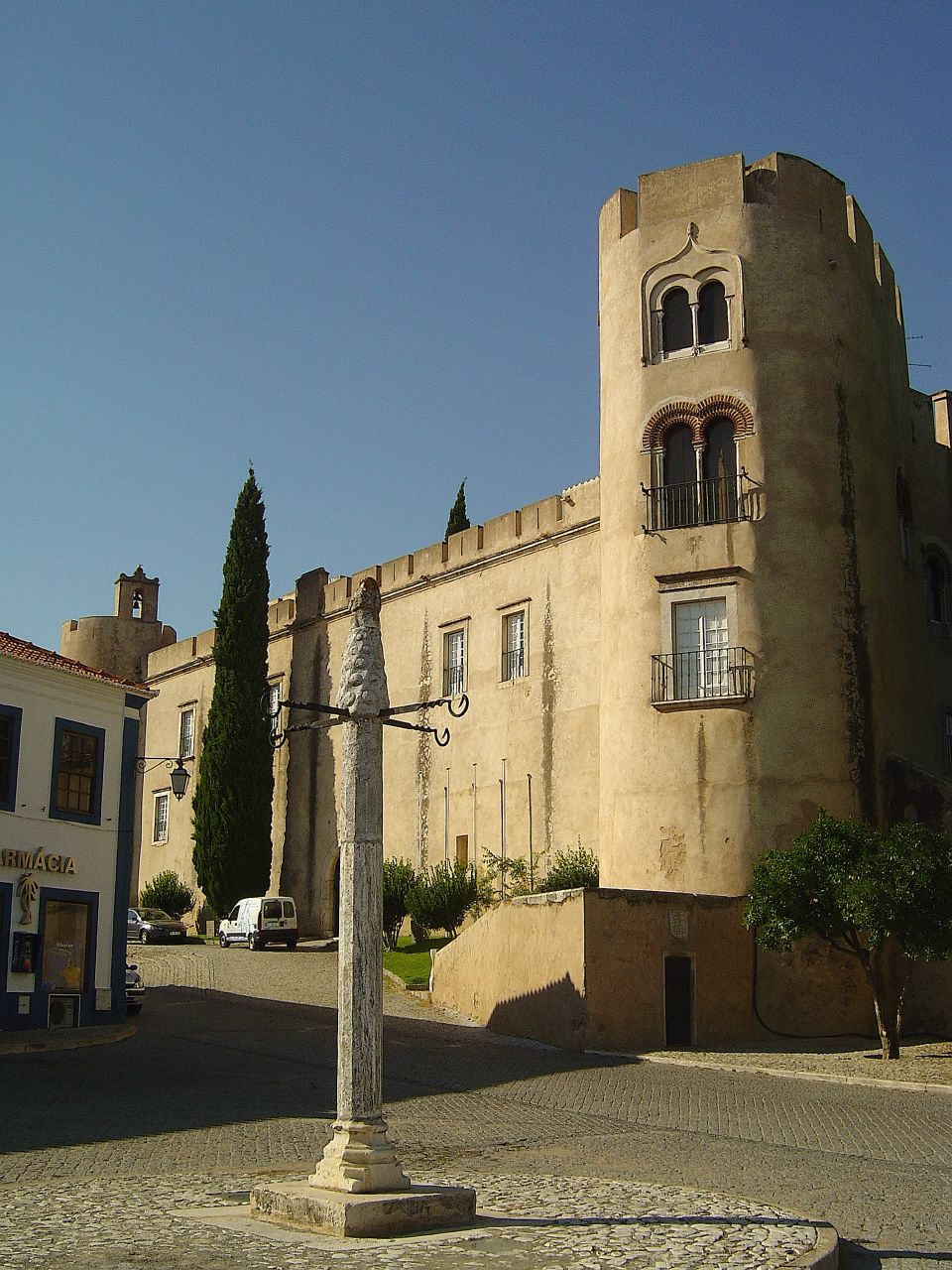
Castle of Alvito

The Alvito region has been inhabited since the Neolithic, and during the period of Roman domination several villae were established nearby, later occupied by Visigoths and Moors. During the Reconquista, Alvito was conquered by the Portuguese in 1234, being later (1251) donated by King Afonso III to Estêvão Anes, chancellor of the kingdom, who promoted the settlement of the area.

The village gained a foral (letter of feudal rights) in 1280, confirmed by King Dinis I in 1283. In 1296 an annual fair was established, attesting the rapid development of the region. In 1387, King John I donated Alvito to knight Diogo Lobo in exchange for his services in the decisive Battle of Aljubarrota (1385), and on the 27 April 1475 the title of Baron of Alvito was granted to the João Fernandes da Silveira and wife D. Maria de Sousa Lobo, rulers of Alvito.

The 15th and 16th centuries were a time of strong economic and populational development of Alvito, which reached 1700 inhabitants in 1527. The Castle of Alvito was rebuilt between 1494 and 1504, and its architecture and decoration show an interesting mix of Manueline (Portuguese late Gothic) and Mudéjar (Arab-influenced) styles, typical of the Alentejo region. Also the main church (matriz) of Alvito, in a mix of Manueline and early Renaissance styles, dates from the early 16th century.

After the 18th century, Alvito faced an economic stagnation that continued until the 20th century, and it now bets on its touristic potential. In 1993, the Castle of Alvito was turned into a luxury hotel of the Pousadas de Portugal brand.

== Parishes ==
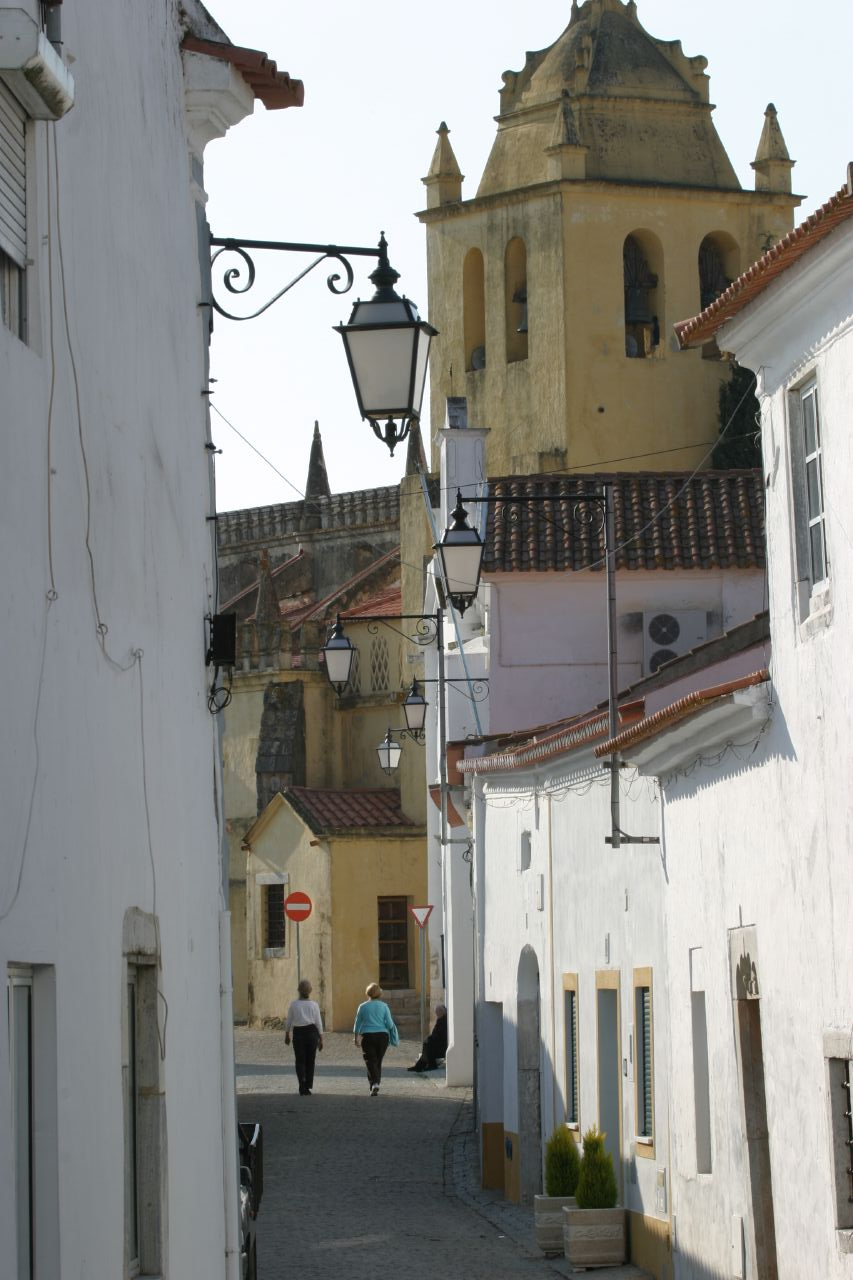
View of a street in Alvito. The yellow building in the background is the main church (matriz) of the village.

Administratively, the municipality is divided into 2 civil parishes (freguesias):

- Alvito
- Vila Nova da Baronia

=== Cities and towns ===
The municipality includes one town:

- Alvito

=== Demographics ===
Year	Population
1801	1079
1849	4569
1900	3065
1930	4556
1960	4850
1981	2968
1991	2650
2001	2688
2011	2504

== International relations ==
Alvito is twinned with:

- Alvito, Italy
