= Pedro de Almada Pereira =

Pedro de Almada Pereira (Odemira, Vila Nova de Milfontes, – Lisbon, 24 May 1911), was an Alentejan landowner, schoolmaster in Messejana and Aljustrel and journalist, founder of the periodical O Campo de Ourique, of which he was the owner, in 1872. He was a son of Tomé José Valério (b. Odemira, Vila Nova de Milfontes), who lived and was a landowner in Odemira, Vila Nova de Milfontes, and wife (m. Aljustrel, Messejana) Maria Amância de Almada, who also used the name of Maria Amância Palma (b. Aljustrel, Messejana).

He married Margarida Francisca Camacho de Negreiros, who also used the surnames Lobo Bravo de Negreiros (b. Aljustrel, Aljustrel), daughter of António Lobo Camacho (b. Aljustrel, Aljustrel), an Alentejan landowner, and wife (m. Serpa) Ana Isabel Bravo de Negreiros (b. Serpa, Salvador). They were the parents of António Lobo de Almada Negreiros.
