= Vidigueira =

- Municipality
- Town of Vidigueira
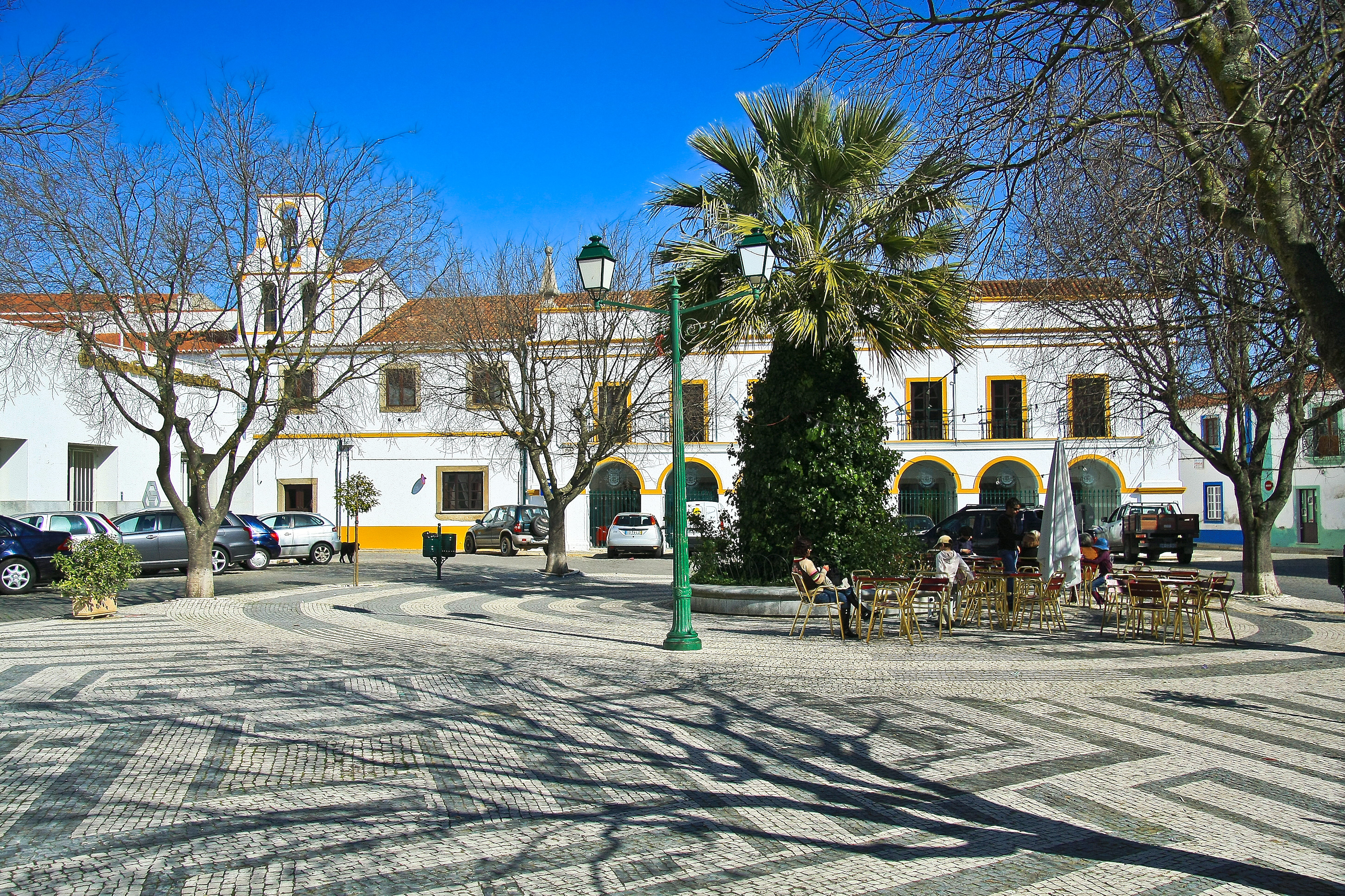
- View of Vidigueira

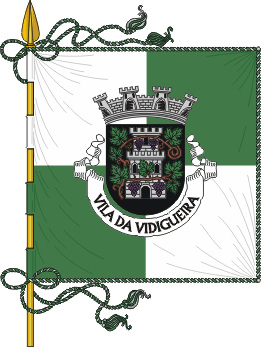
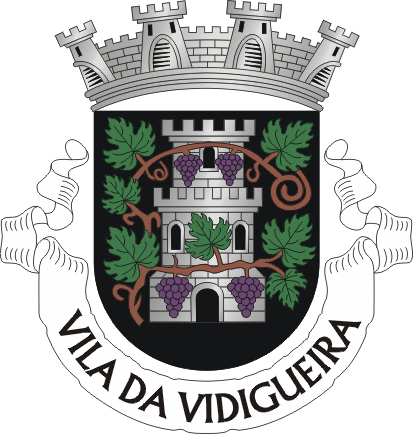
- Flag Coat of arms
- Interactive map of Vidigueira
- Coordinates: 38°12′N 7°48′W
- Country: Portugal
- Region: Alentejo
- Intermunic. comm.: Baixo Alentejo
- District: Beja
- Parishes: 4

Government
  - President: Manuel Narra (CDU)

Area
  - Total: 316.0 km^{2} (122.0 sq mi)

Population (2021)
  - Total: 5,176
  - Density: 16.38/km^{2} (42.42/sq mi)
- Time zone: UTC+00:00 (WET)
  - Summer (DST): UTC+01:00 (WEST)
- Local holiday: Ascension Day (date varies)
- Website: www.cm-vidigueira.pt

Vidigueira (European Portuguese: [vi.ðiˈɣɐj.ɾɐ], locally [vi.diˈɡe.ɾɐ]), officially the Town of Vidigueira (Portuguese: Vila da Vidigueira), is a town and a municipality in the District of Beja in Portugal. The population in 2011 was 5,932, in an area of 316.61 km^{2}.

The present Mayor is Manuel Rosa Narra, elected by the Unitary Democratic Coalition. The municipal holiday is Ascension Day. The archaeological site of the Roman Ruins of Villa Áulica and Convent of São Cucufate are situated near Vidigueira.

== Parishes ==
Administratively, the municipality is divided into 4 civil parishes (freguesias):

- Pedrógão
- Selmes
- Vidigueira
- Vila de Frades

== Notable people ==
- Vasco da Gama (c.1460s – 1524) the Portuguese navigator, was made Count of Vidigueira by King Manuel I on the return from his discovery of the maritime route from Europe to India
- Achilles Statius (1524 in Vidigueira – 1581) humanist poet and commentator
- Forebears of radical Dutch philosopher Baruch Spinoza (1662-1677) lived in Vidigueira since at least the 16th century, before escaping from the Portuguese Inquisition to the Dutch Republic. A number of them were employed in service to the counts of Vidigueira.

== See also ==
- Vidigueira DOC
