= António Lobo de Almada Negreiros =

Portuguese journalist writer, essayist and poet

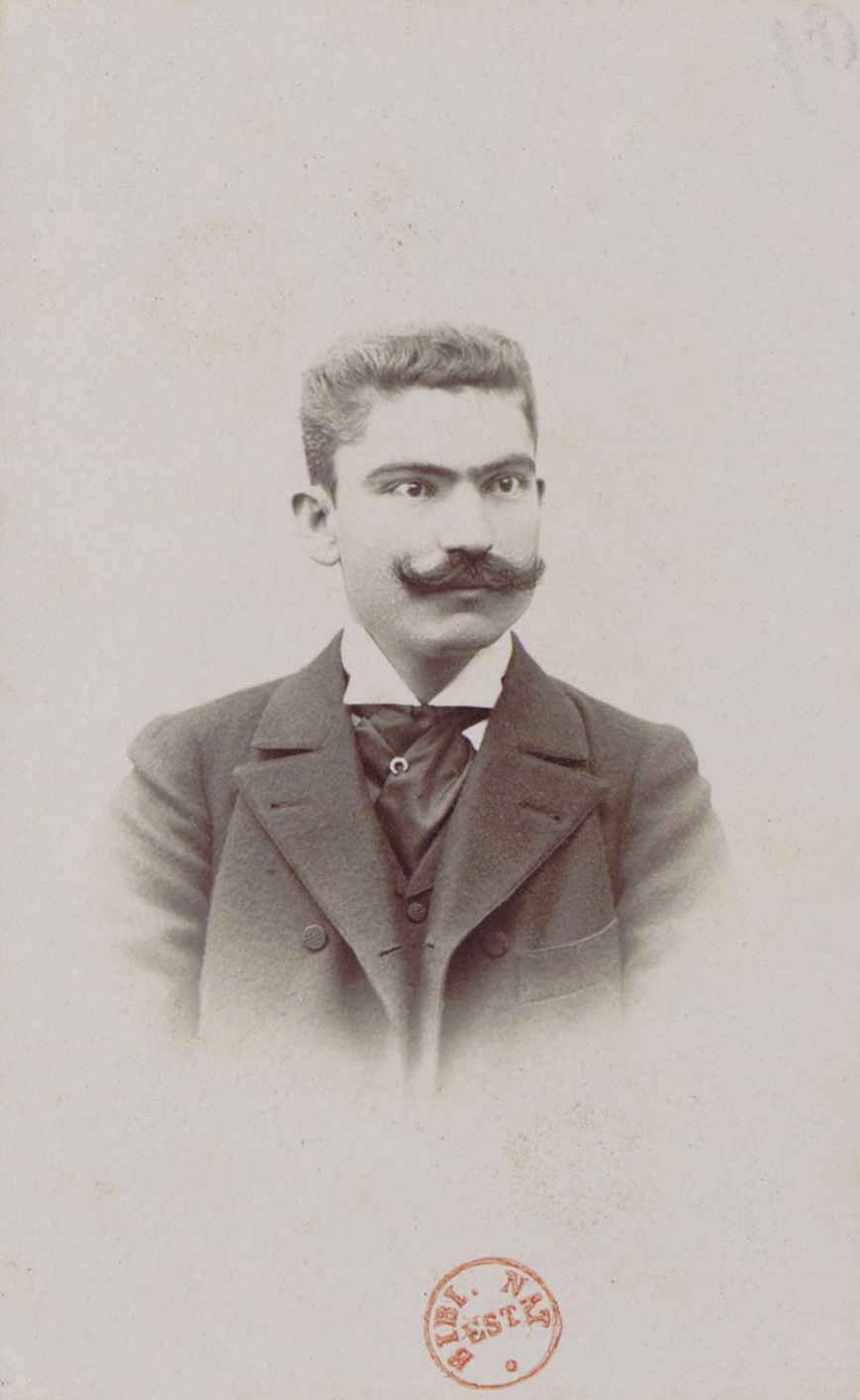
António Lobo de Almada Negreiros

António Lobo de Almada Negreiros (13 August 1868 in Alentejo, Aljustrel, Aljustrel – 12 June 1939 in Paris) was a Portuguese journalist, colonialist writer, essayist and poet.

== Biography ==
He lived in São Tomé Island, in Portuguese São Tomé and Príncipe, where he was the Administrator of the Council and, already a widower, he settled in Paris, where he participated in the organization of the Exposition Universelle (1900), and was Vice Consul of Portugal, etc.

He was a son of Pedro de Almada Pereira and wife Margarida Francisca Camacho de Negreiros or Lobo Bravo de Negreiros.

He married in the São Tomé Island, Água Grande District, City of São Tomé, at the Parrish of Conceição, on 30 April 1892 Elvira Freire Sobral (São Tomé Island, Mé-Zóchi District, Trindade, Roça Saudade, – São Tomé Island, 29 December 1896), oldest child and natural daughter recognized and raised by her father José António Freire Sobral by Leopoldina Amélia de Azevedo, who died in childbirth of and with her daughter. She studied in Coimbra, at the Colégio das Religiosas Ursulinas, where she won the fame of a skilled drawer. Her half-brother Joaquim Freire Sobral was also an artist and a painter. They had, beside a daughter, two sons António (b. 1895) and José Sobral de Almada Negreiros.
