= Almodôvar =

- Municipality
- Town of Almodôvar
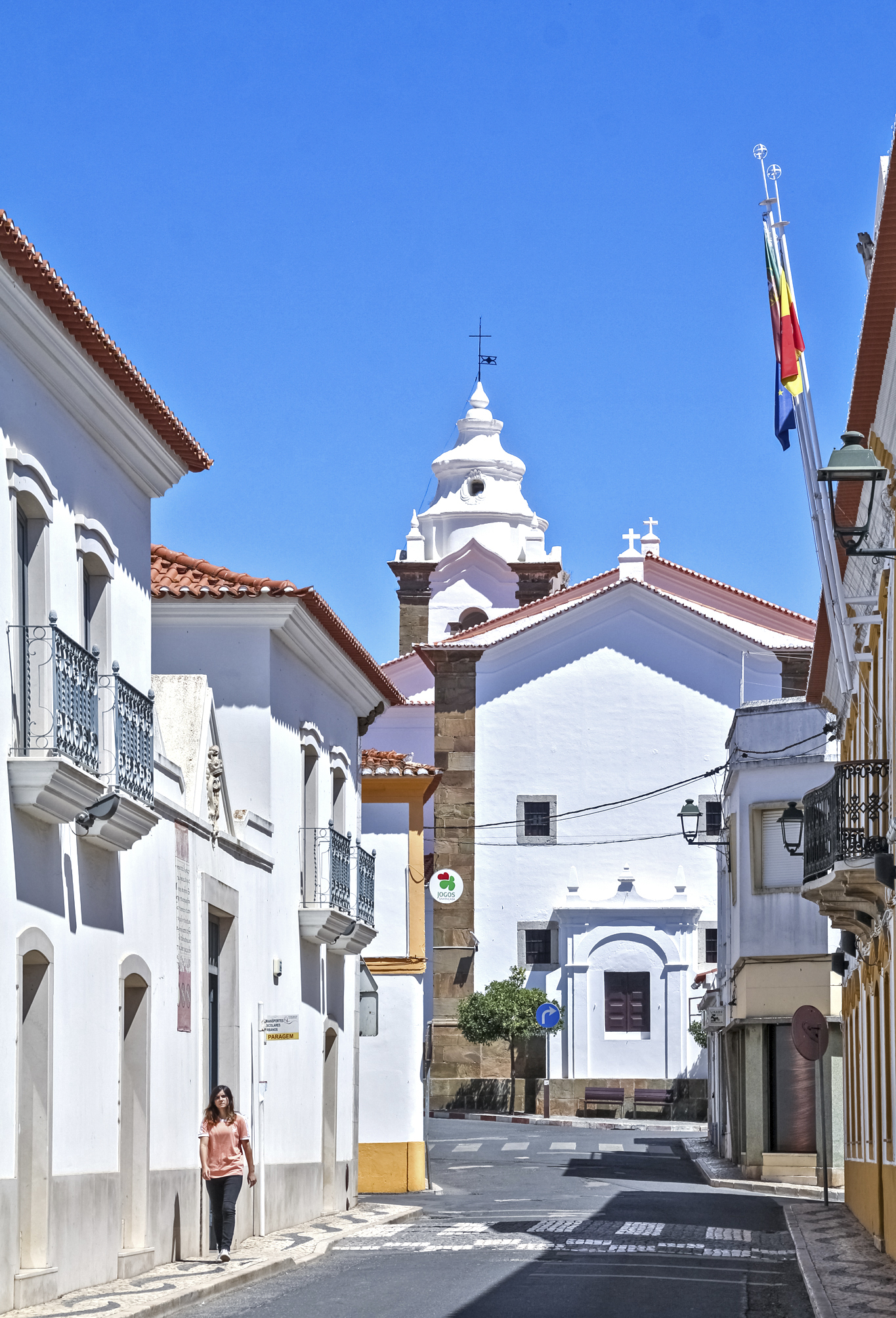
- View of Almodôvar

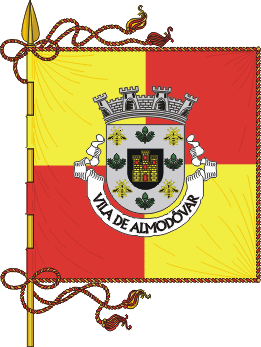
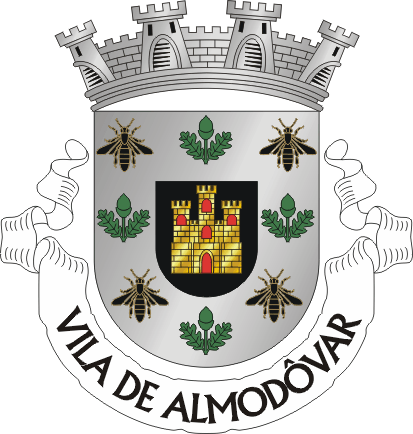
- Flag Coat of arms
- Interactive map of Almodôvar
- Location in Portugal
- Coordinates: 37°30′N 8°03′W
- Country: Portugal
- Region: Alentejo
- Intermunic. comm.: Baixo Alentejo
- District: Beja
- Parishes: 6

Government
  - President: António Bota (PS)

Area
  - Total: 777.88 km^{2} (300.34 sq mi)

Population (2011)
  - Total: 7,449
  - Density: 9.576/km^{2} (24.80/sq mi)
- Time zone: UTC+00:00 (WET)
  - Summer (DST): UTC+01:00 (WEST)
- Local holiday: Saint John; June 24
- Website: www.cm-almodovar.pt

Almodôvar (pronounced [almuˈðovaɾ] or [-vɐɾ], from Arabic: المدوّر, romanized: al-Mudawwar, lit. 'the Round one'), officially known as Town of Almodôvar (Portuguese: Vila de Almodôvar), is a town and a municipality in the District of Beja, Portugal. The population in 2011 was 7,449, in an area of 777.88 km^{2}.

The present Mayor is António Bota, a member of the Socialist Party.

The town's Museum of Southwestern Writing is featured on episode 1 of the three part documentary The Celts: Blood, Iron and Sacrifice, which was broadcast by the BBC in 2015, and hosted by Alice Roberts and Neil Oliver, featuring stone tables containing what some archeologists believe to be a proto-Celtic language.

== Parishes ==
The municipality is subdivided into the following parishes:

- Aldeia dos Fernandes
- Almodôvar e Graça dos Padrões
- Santa Clara-a-Nova e Gomes Aires
- Rosário
- Santa Cruz
- São Barnabé

== History ==
The village of Almodôvar is signaled in medieval Islamic cartography under the name al-Mudawwar meaning "thing in round" or "surrounded in round". The settlement was rebuilt at the time of the Muslim conquest of the Iberian Peninsula, with walls surrounding it and a castle inside. Remains of these have, however, disappeared.

Almodôvar received its first Foral (Town Charter) on April 17, 1285, by order of King Dinis of Portugal, confirmed by a new Foral on June 1, 1512, by order of King Manuel I of Portugal.

== Geography ==
The Almodôvar area is situated in an area of transition between the Alentejo peneplain, in the northernmost part of the municipality, and the hills of the Serra do Caldeirão to the south of its territory. The Iberian Pyrite Belt (IPB) which begins in Aljustrel and spreads through the lower Alentejo extending into Southern Spain crosses the area of the municipality.

=== Climate ===
The municipality experiences a Mediterranean climate with hot, dry summers and mild wet winters.

Climate data for Santa Clara-a-Nova, 1980-2000, elevation: 284 m or 932 ft
| Month | Jan | Feb | Mar | Apr | May | Jun | Jul | Aug | Sep | Oct | Nov | Dec | Year |
|---|---|---|---|---|---|---|---|---|---|---|---|---|---|
| Daily mean °C (°F) | 9.8 (49.6) | 10.7 (51.3) | 13.4 (56.1) | 14.1 (57.4) | 17.2 (63.0) | 21.1 (70.0) | 24.3 (75.7) | 24.2 (75.6) | 22.3 (72.1) | 17.8 (64.0) | 14.2 (57.6) | 11.4 (52.5) | 16.7 (62.1) |
| Average precipitation mm (inches) | 66.0 (2.60) | 45.0 (1.77) | 35.1 (1.38) | 66.8 (2.63) | 38.4 (1.51) | 6.4 (0.25) | 2.3 (0.09) | 3.4 (0.13) | 25.0 (0.98) | 63.1 (2.48) | 97.2 (3.83) | 107.7 (4.24) | 556.4 (21.89) |
Source: Portuguese Environmental Agency

== Notable people ==
- Katchana (born 1983) real name, Ricardo Jorge Guerreiro Felisberto, a footballer with over 300 club caps
- Daniel Mestre (born 1986) a Portuguese cyclist
