= Ourique (meteorite) =

Meteorite found in Portugal

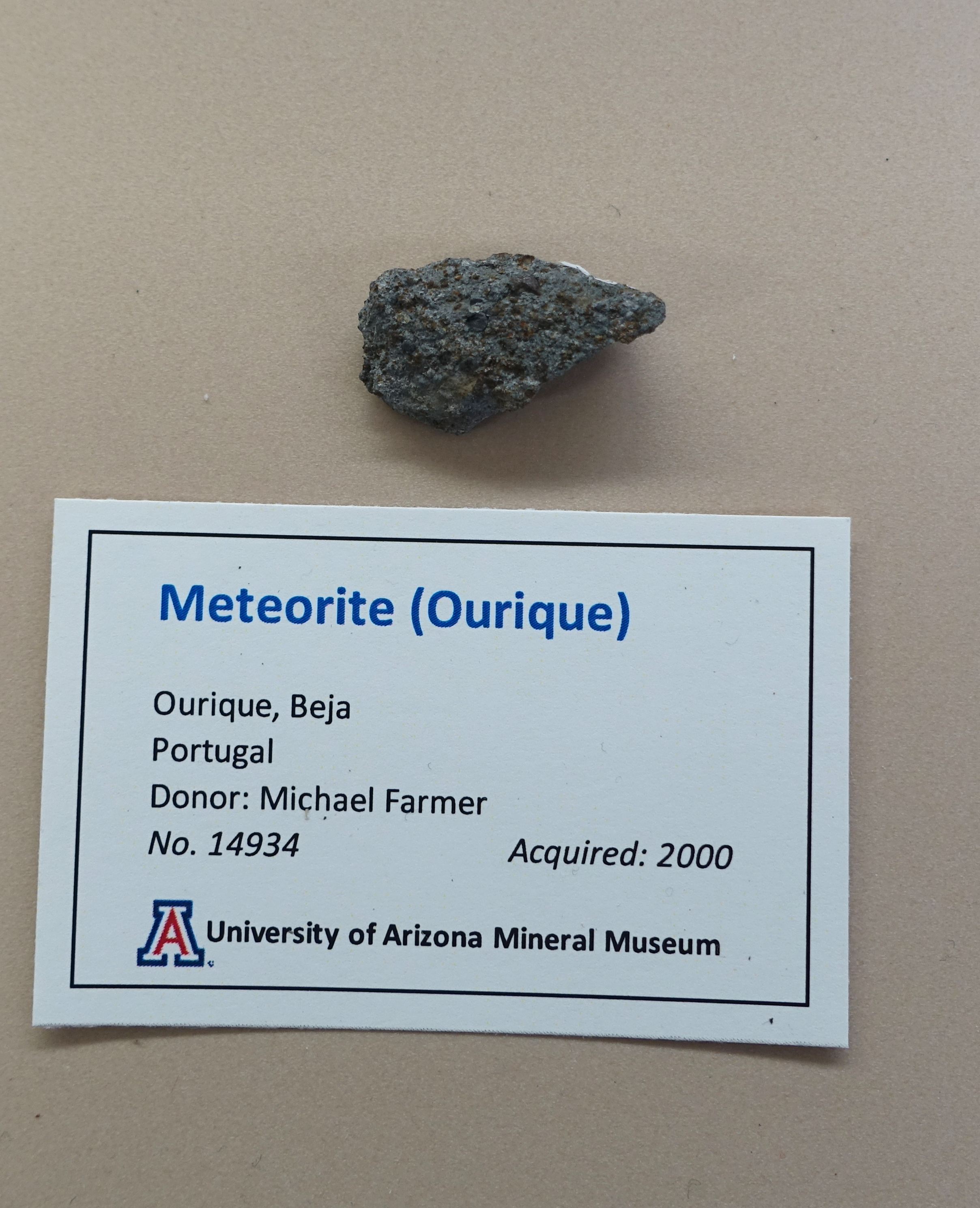
- Type: Chondrite
- Class: Ordinary chondrite
- Group: H4
- Composition: olivine Fa18.3; pyroxene Fs16.4;
- Country: Portugal
- Region: Beja
- Coordinates: 37°36′30″N 8°16′48″W
- Observed fall: Yes
- Fall date: December 28, 1998
- TKW: >20 kg

Ourique is a H4 meteorite that fell in 1998 in Portugal.

== History ==
During the night between 27 and 28 December 1998, a brilliant fireball and loud noises were reported by several people in Beja region.

António Silva recovered the first fragments two days after the fall and, subsequently, local villagers recovered other pieces. The meteorite made an elliptical crater 20 centimetres (7.9 in) deep, 60 centimetres (24 in) long and 30 centimetres (12 in) wide. Most of all fragments were found within an elliptical area long 55 metres (180 ft).

== Composition and classification ==
It is a H4 type ordinary chondrite with a well-developed chondritic structure. Chemical analysis reported: olivine Fa18.3 and pyroxene Fs16.4.

== See also ==
- Glossary of meteoritics
- Meteorite
