= José António Freire Sobral =

19th-century Portuguese farmer

José António Freire Sobral (10 June 1840 in Sobral de Monte Agraço, São Quintino – 19 April 1905 in Lisbon), was a Portuguese farmer and a large exporter of coffee, cocoa and woods who made his fortune in São Tomé Island in Portuguese São Tomé and Príncipe. He was the owner of the Roças Saudade and Santa Maria in the village of Trindade and was a Vocal of the Council of the Province of Portuguese São Tomé e Príncipe and Regedor of the village of Trindade. He was made Commander of the Order of Agricultural Merit of Portugal.

He was the son of António Freire, an agricultural employee, and wife Joana Maria, both born in Sobral de Monte Agraço, São Quintino, from where he took his surname.

He married Mariana Emília de Sousa, without issue. He had however, before his marriage, eight natural children from three different mothers, and was the Godfather of his grandson José de Almada Negreiros. By Leopoldina Amélia de Azevedo, born in Benguela, he had five children. She lived in São Tomé Island, where she had four of their children. Since he refused to marry her she ran off back to Benguela, where she died of childbirth of her fifth child. She was a natural daughter of Manuel de Azevedo Pereira, born in Santarém, who lived in Benguela, where he had natural daughters by Luzia, an African woman born there. Their oldest natural child was daughter Elvira Freire Sobral (São Tomé Island, Mé-Zóchi District, Trindade, Roça Saudade, – São Tomé Island, 29 December 1896), who was recognized and raised by her father, married in São Tomé Island, Água Grande District, City of São Tomé, at the Parrish of Conceição, on 30 April 1892 António Lobo de Almada Negreiros and died at childbirth of and with her daughter. She studied in Coimbra, at the Colégio das Religiosas Ursulinas, where she won the fame of a skilled drawer. Her half-brother Joaquim Freire Sobral was also an artist and a painter. They had, beside a daughter, two sons António (b. 1895) and José Sobral de Almada Negreiros.
