= Ourique =

- Municipality
- Town of Ourique
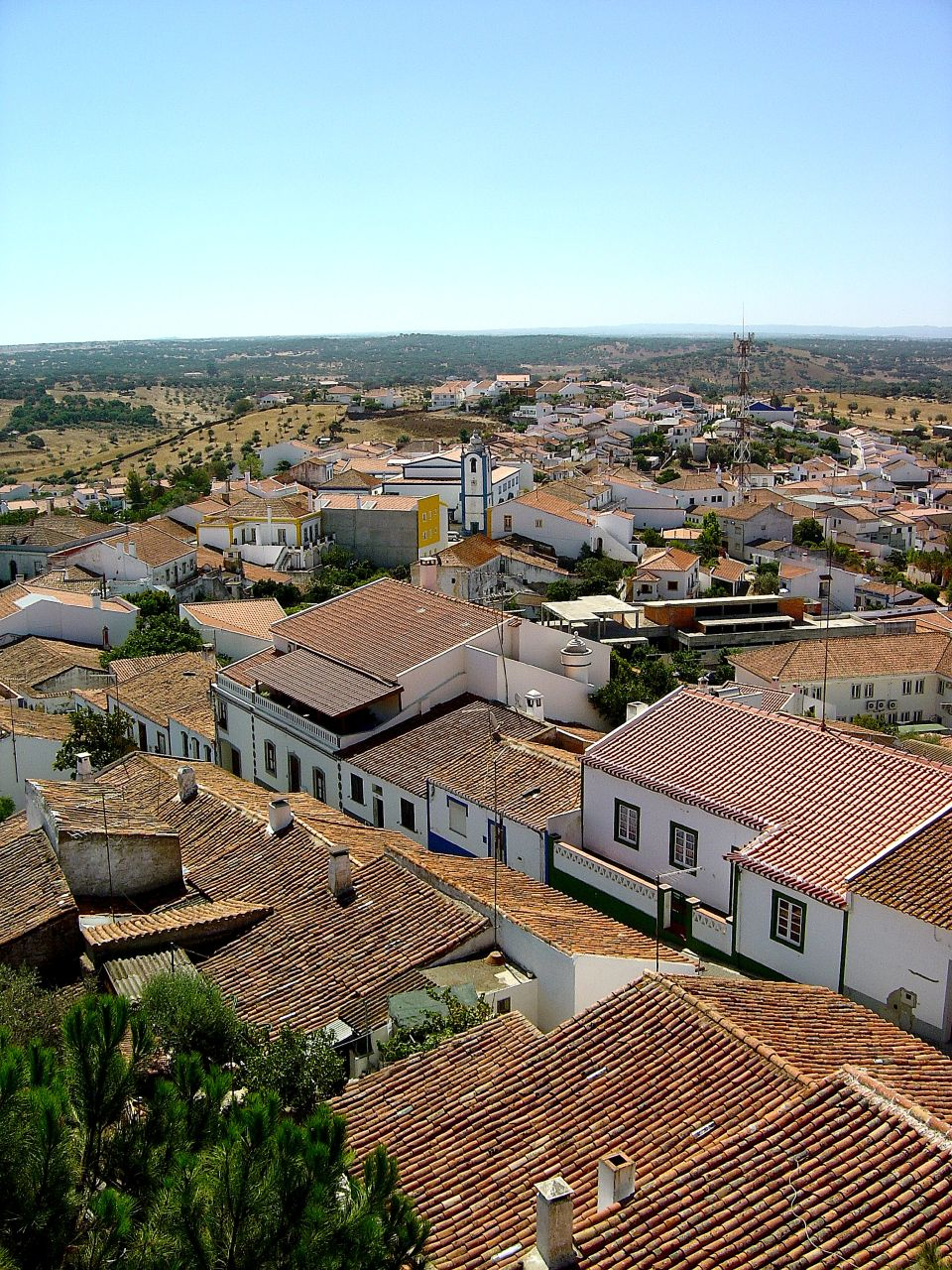
- View of Ourique

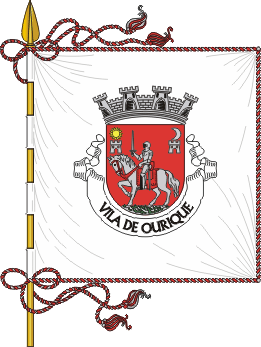
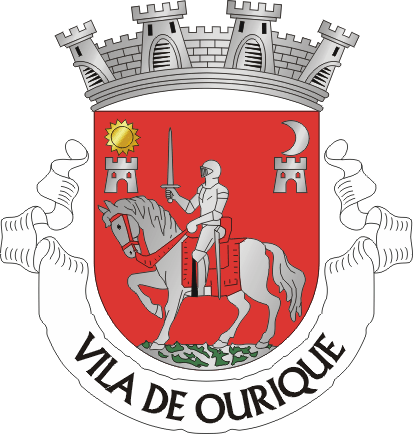
- Flag Coat of arms
- Interactive map of Ourique
- Coordinates: 37°39′N 8°13′W
- Country: Portugal
- Region: Alentejo
- Intermunic. comm.: Baixo Alentejo
- District: Beja
- Parishes: 4

Government
  - President: Marcelo Guerreiro (PS)

Area
  - Total: 663.31 km^{2} (256.11 sq mi)

Population (2021)
  - Total: 4,840
  - Density: 7.30/km^{2} (18.9/sq mi)
- Time zone: UTC+00:00 (WET)
  - Summer (DST): UTC+01:00 (WEST)
- Local holiday: September 8
- Website: cm-ourique.pt

Ourique (locally [o(w)ˈɾi.kɨ]), officially the Town of Ourique (Portuguese: Vila de Ourique), is a city in the District of Beja in Portugal. The population in 2011 was 5,389, in an area of 663.31 km^{2}.

This town is traditionally considered the site of the famous Battle of Ourique in 1139, which saw the forces of Portuguese Prince Afonso Henriques defeat a Muslim Almoravid force. The present Mayor is Marcelo Guerreiro, elected by the Socialist Party, who became the youngest Mayor in Portugal, aged 25, in 2015. The municipal holiday is September 8.

== Battle of Ourique ==
There is no certainty about the exact location of the battle of Ourique, although it is typically said to have taken place in the countryside between the towns of Castro Verde and Ourique. Five Muslim kings allied their forces against the Portuguese army, but after a terrible and lengthy fight, the allied forces became scattered in the Alentejo plains. This would later be considered by the Portuguese to have been a divine miracle, forever forming part of the legend of Castro Verde.

According to most accounts of the legend, Afonso Henriques was visited before the battle by an old man who saw in a dream that Henriques would be victorious because God would intervene to help him. The old man advised the Henriques to leave the encampment alone when he heard the bell of the local chapel. Riding off, Henriques was surprised by a ray of light that showed him (in one interpretation) the sign of the cross and Jesus Christ on a crucifix. He knelt in its presence and heard the voice of Jesus Christ telling him he would defeat the Moors. The following day, he succeeded in routing the Moors (through his own courage and faith, as the stories go) and was almost immediately declared the king of Portugal. He would include five shields in his coat of arms, representing the five defeated kingdoms. To honor the outstanding victory, then-King D. Sebastião later ordered the construction of St. Peter of the Heads Chapel.

== Parishes ==
Administratively, the municipality is divided into 4 civil parishes (freguesias):

- Garvão e Santa Luzia
- Ourique
- Panóias e Conceição
- Santana da Serra

== Notable people ==
- José Júlio da Costa (1893–1946) a Portuguese left-wing political activist who assassinated President Sidónio Pais of Portugal in 1918

== See also ==
- Ourique (meteorite)
