= List of freguesias of Portugal =

The 3092 freguesias of Portugal are listed In alphabetic groups (determined by a freguesia's first letter) in the template below. They are listed according to the following format:

- Municipality
  - Freguesia

A complete and unbroken list of freguesias all on one page is not available. A partial list is in Category:Freguesias of Portugal.
