= Alentejo Litoral =

- Intermunicipal community
- Logo
- Interactive map of Alentejo Litoral
- Location in Portugal
- Coordinates: 37°57′N 8°52′W
- Country: Portugal
- Region: Alentejo
- Established: 2009
- Seat: Grândola
- Municipalities: 5

Area
  - Total: 5,309.41 km^{2} (2,049.97 sq mi)

Population (2011)
  - Total: 97,925
  - Density: 18.444/km^{2} (47.769/sq mi)
- Time zone: UTC+00:00 (WET)
  - Summer (DST): UTC+01:00 (WEST)
- Website: www.cimal.pt

The Comunidade Intermunicipal do Alentejo Litoral (European Portuguese: [ɐlẽˈtɛʒu lituˈɾal]; "Intermunicipal Community of Littoral Alentejo") is an administrative division in Portugal. It was created in May 2009. It is also a NUTS3 subregion of the Alentejo Region. The seat of the intermunicipal community is Grândola. Alentejo Litoral comprises municipalities of both the Beja District and the Setúbal District. The population in 2011 was 97,925, in an area of 5,309.41 km^{2}.

== Municipalities ==
It is composed of five municipalities:

Municipality	Population (2011)	Area (km^{2})
Alcácer do Sal	13,046	1499.87
Grândola	14,826	825.94
Odemira	26,066	1720.60
Santiago do Cacém	29,749	1059.69
Sines	14,238	203.30
Total	97,925	5,309.41
