= Alentejo Region =

Alentejo Região do Alentejo
- NUTS
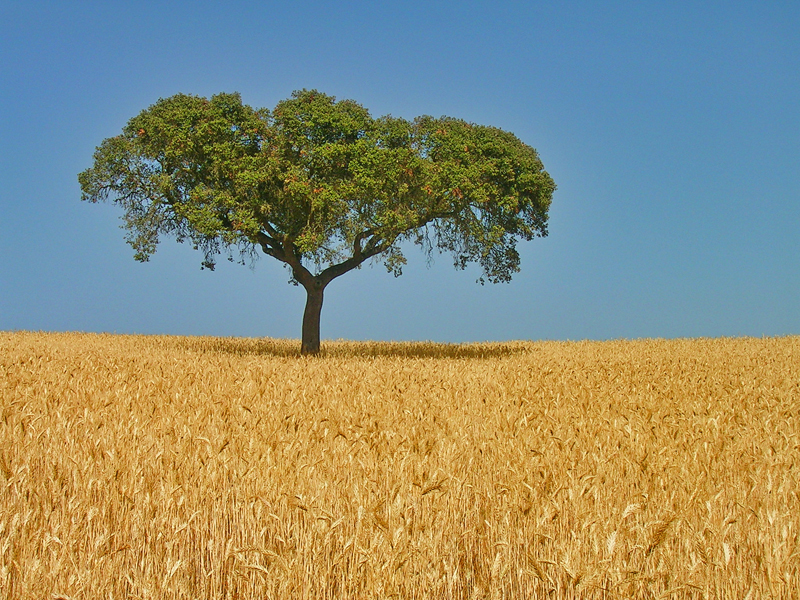
- A typical landscape of the Alentejo
- Etymology: além-Tejo Portuguese for beyond the Tagus or across the Tagus (note: Lezíria do Tejo is partly of the left margin of the Tagus and partly on the right margin of the Tagus)
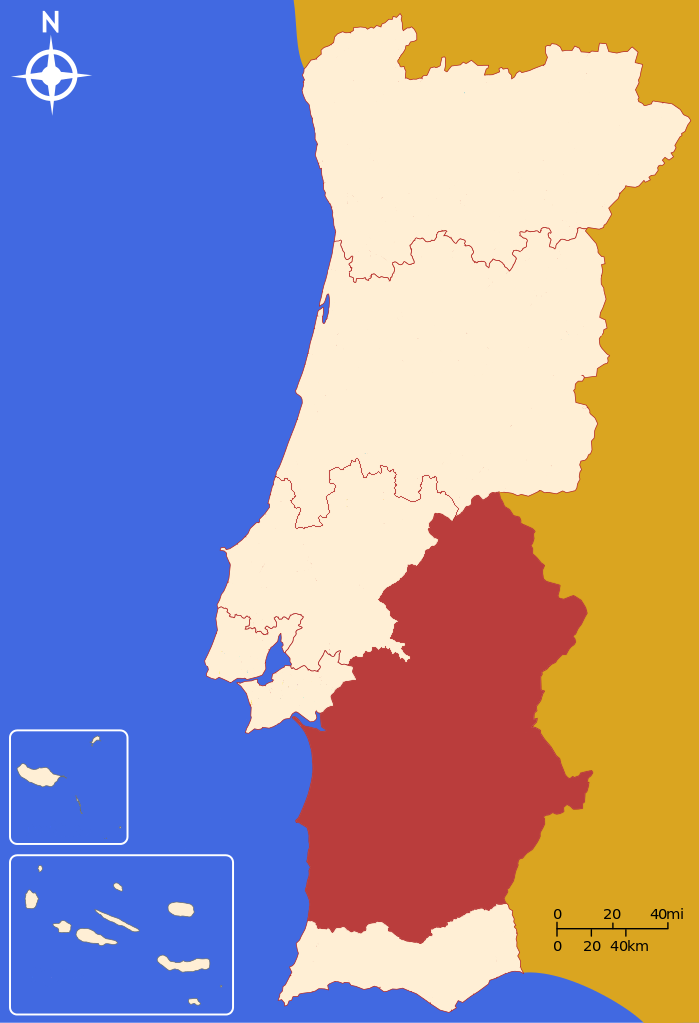
- Location of the Alentejo Region in Portugal
- Coordinates: 38.5667°N 7.9000°W
- Country: Portugal

Area
  - Total: 27,317 km^{2} (10,547 sq mi)

Population (2011)
  - Total: 471,322 (7th)
  - Density: 17.254/km^{2} (44.687/sq mi)

GDP (nominal)
  - Total: €12.035 billion (2024)
  - Per capita: €25,348 (2024)
- Time zone: UTC+0 (WET)
  - Summer (DST): UTC+1 (WEST)
- HDI (2021): 0.842 very high · 5th
- NUTS: PT18
- Geographic detail from Instituto Geográfico Português (2010)

Alentejo Region (European Portuguese pronunciation: [ɐlẽˈtɛʒu]) is one of the seven NUTS 2 regions of Portugal. It covers all of the historical Alentejo Province and part of the historical Ribatejo and Estremadura provinces.

The greater region is defined within Portugal by the land bordering the left bank of the river Tagus to the North and extending to the South where it borders the Algarve region. The origin of its name, "além" + "Tejo" combined as Alentejo, literally translates to "Beyond-the-Tagus". However, a large part of the subregion Lezíria do Tejo is located on the right bank of the Tagus. The Alentejo is completely located beyond the left margin of the Tagus River.

Its main cities are Évora, Elvas, Portalegre, Beja, Moura, Serpa, and Sines.

== Subdivisions ==
The region is subdivided into four intermunicipal communities (NUTS 3 regions):

- Alentejo Litoral
- Alentejo Central
- Alto Alentejo
- Baixo Alentejo

== Demographics ==
The resident population of the Alentejo stands at around 759,000 (fourth quarter, 2008 – 2 700 less than the fourth quarter of 2007), with 49% men and 51% women. It is the least densely populated region in the country, representing over one third of national territory but only 7.1% of its population. It is also the region with the oldest population, 22.9% being 65 years of age or more (while the national average is 17.5%).

The population is still declining – especially in the east of the Alentejo. Locals are said to migrate from the villages to the towns and from the towns to cities beyond the Alentejo. Some migration into the Alentejo is from Northern Europeans looking to escape their overcrowded regions, though not always permanently, just for sunny holiday retreats. People from China, Brazil, and mostly from (South-)Eastern Europe add to curbing population decline.

== Economy ==
In 2006, the region had an estimated GDP per inhabitant rating of 17,200 EUR. In 2018, the Gross domestic product (GDP) of the region was 13.1 billion euros, accounting for 6.4% of Portugal's economic output. GDP per capita adjusted for purchasing power was 21,700 euros or 72% of the EU27 average in the same year. The GDP per employee was 73% of the EU average.

== Maps ==
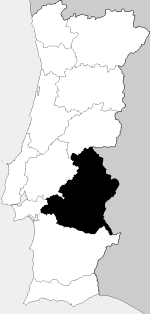
Alto Alentejo Province 1936

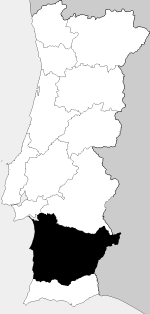
Baixo Alentejo Province 1936

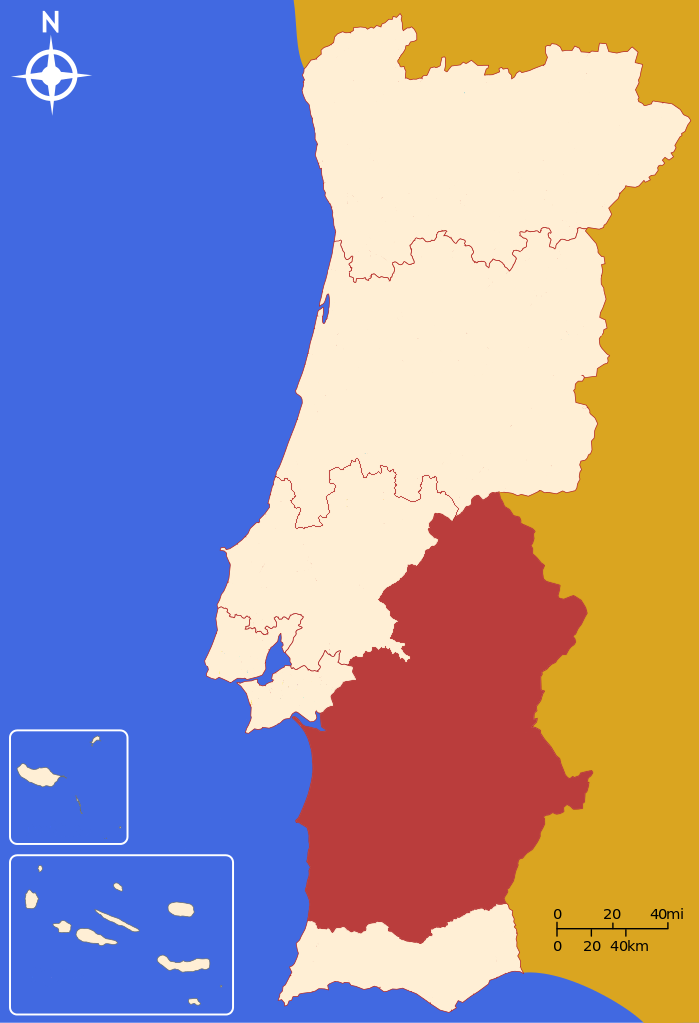
Location of Alentejo in Portugal

Alto Alentejo (NUTS III)

Baixo Alentejo (NUTS III)

Alentejo Litoral (NUTS III)

Alentejo Central (NUTS III)
