= Beja District =

District of Portugal

Coordinates: 38°01′N 7°52′W

District of Beja Distrito de Beja (Portuguese)
- District
- Flag Coat of arms

- Country: Portugal
- Region: Alentejo
- Historical province: Baixo Alentejo
- No. of municipalities: 14
- No. of parishes: 84
- Capital: Beja

Area
  - Total: 10,225 km^{2} (3,948 sq mi)

Population (2011)
  - Total: 152,758
  - Density: 14.940/km^{2} (38.694/sq mi)
- ISO 3166 code: PT-02
- No. of parliamentary representatives: 3

The Beja District (Portuguese: Distrito de Beja; Portuguese pronunciation: [ˈbɛʒɐ]) is located in southern Portugal. The district capital is the city of Beja. It is the largest district of the country by area, comprising around 11% of Portuguese territory. It borders Spain.

== Municipalities ==
The district is composed of 14 municipalities:

- Aljustrel
- Almodôvar
- Alvito
- Barrancos
- Beja
- Castro Verde
- Cuba
- Ferreira do Alentejo
- Mértola
- Moura
- Odemira
- Ourique
- Serpa
- Vidigueira

All 14 municipalities are divided into 84 freguesias or parishes.

== Summary of votes and seats won 1976-2022 ==
Summary of election results from Beja district, 1976-2022
Parties	%	S	%	S	%	S	%	S	%	S	%	S	%	S	%	S	%	S	%	S	%	S	%	S	%	S	%	S	%	S	%	S
Parties	1976		1979		1980		1983		1985		1987		1991		1995		1999		2002		2005		2009		2011		2015		2019		2022	
PS	32.0	2	22.0	1	21.1	1	28.0	2	20.1	1	20.3	1	28.4	1	45.8	2	46.7	2	43.5	2	51.0	2	34.9	2	29.8	1	37.3	1	40.7	2	43.7	2
PSD	8.2		In AD				11.8		13.7	1	24.5	1	29.3	1	15.7	1	14.5		21.2		12.3		14.6		23.7	1	In PàF		13.3		15.9	
CDS-PP	4.2		In AD				4.1		2.2		2.0		2.3		3.6		3.9		3.7		2.9		5.7		7.3		In PàF		2.3		0.8	
PCP/APU/CDU	44.0	4	50.7	3	47.1	3	49.4	3	44.9	3	38.7	3	30.4	2	29.2	1	28.3	1	24.2	1	24.1	1	29.1	1	25.4	1	25.0	1	22.8	1	18.4	1
AD			19.0	1	22.4	1																										
PàF																											20.1	1				
Total seats	6		5										4				3															
Source: Comissão Nacional de Eleições
