= Beja (Assembly of the Republic constituency) =

Constituency of the Assembly of the Republic, the national legislature of Portugal

- Constituency for the Assembly of the Republic
- Location of Beja within Portugal
- District: Beja
- Population: 149,546 (2024)
- Electorate: 118,320 (2025)
- Area: 10,263 km^{2} (2024)

Current Constituency
- Created: 1976
- Seats: List: 3 (1999–present); 4 (1991–1999); 5 (1979–1991); 6 (1976–1979)
- Deputies: List: Pedro do Carmo (PS); António Carneiro (CH); Gonçalo Valente (PSD)

Beja is one of the 22 multi-member constituencies of the Assembly of the Republic, the national legislature of Portugal. The constituency was established in 1976 when the Assembly of the Republic was established by the constitution following the restoration of democracy. It is conterminous with the district of Beja. The constituency currently elects three of the 230 members of the Assembly of the Republic using the closed party-list proportional representation electoral system. At the 2025 legislative election it had 118,320 registered electors.

== Electoral system ==
Beja currently elects three of the 230 members of the Assembly of the Republic using the closed party-list proportional representation electoral system. Seats are allocated using the D'Hondt method.

== Election results ==
=== Summary ===
Election	Unitary Democrats CDU / APU / PCP			Left Bloc BE / UDP			LIVRE L			Socialists PS / FRS			People Animals Nature PAN			Democratic Renewal PRD			Social Democrats PSD / PàF / AD / PPD			Liberals IL			CDS – People's CDS–PP / CDS			Chega CH / PPV/CDC / PPV		
Election	Votes	%	Seats	Votes	%	Seats	Votes	%	Seats	Votes	%	Seats	Votes	%	Seats	Votes	%	Seats	Votes	%	Seats	Votes	%	Seats	Votes	%	Seats	Votes	%	Seats
2025	10,000	13.88%	0	1,365	1.89%	0	1,547	2.15%	0	19,536	27.12%	1	636	0.88%	0				15,407	21.39%	1	1,439	2.00%	0				20,447	28.38%	1
2024	11,570	15.45%	0	3,393	4.53%	0	1,369	1.83%	0	24,408	32.59%	1	943	1.26%	0				12,890	17.21%	1	1,708	2.28%	0				16,595	22.16%	1
2022	12,442	18.82%	1	2,511	3.80%	0	491	0.74%	0	29,533	44.66%	2	597	0.90%	0				10,767	16.28%	0	1,388	2.10%	0	515	0.78%	0	6,932	10.48%	0
2019	14,655	23.71%	1	5,833	9.44%	0	398	0.64%	0	26,161	42.33%	2	1,269	2.05%	0				8,546	13.83%	0	279	0.45%	0	1,490	2.41%	0	1,313	2.12%	0
2015	18,592	25.78%	1	6,105	8.47%	0	272	0.38%	0	27,778	38.52%	1	598	0.83%	0				14,980	20.77%	1									
2011	19,000	26.33%	1	3,890	5.39%	0				22,307	30.91%	1	532	0.74%	0				17,710	24.54%	1				5,463	7.57%	0			
2009	23,665	29.85%	1	8,142	10.27%	0				28,418	35.85%	2							11,889	15.00%	0				4,655	5.87%	0	124	0.16%	0
2005	21,036	24.63%	1	4,144	4.85%	0				44,556	52.16%	2							10,730	12.56%	0				2,562	3.00%	0			
2002	19,911	24.71%	1	1,554	1.93%	0				35,814	44.44%	2							17,449	21.65%	0				3,063	3.80%	0			
1999	24,080	28.91%	1	1,314	1.58%	0				39,729	47.70%	2							12,310	14.78%	0				3,313	3.98%	0			
1995	28,178	29.75%	1	992	1.05%	0				44,168	46.64%	2							15,125	15.97%	1				3,495	3.69%	0			
1991	29,429	31.32%	2							27,470	29.24%	1				790	0.84%	0	28,308	30.13%	1				2,245	2.39%	0			
1987	39,592	39.88%	3	1,098	1.11%	0				20,742	20.89%	1				5,868	5.91%	0	25,121	25.31%	1				2,011	2.03%	0			
1985	50,814	46.26%	3	1,438	1.31%	0				22,805	20.76%	1				13,127	11.95%	0	15,532	14.14%	1				2,471	2.25%	0			
1983	56,986	51.29%	3	980	0.88%	0				32,265	29.04%	2							13,545	12.19%	0				4,719	4.25%	0			
1980	57,988	48.46%	3	1,589	1.33%	0				25,996	21.72%	1							27,619	23.08%	1									
1979	63,498	52.25%	3	2,201	1.81%	0				27,503	22.63%	1							23,743	19.54%	1									
1976	52,839	46.09%	4	2,671	2.33%	0				38,405	33.50%	2							9,882	8.62%	0				5,004	4.36%	0			

(Figures in italics represent alliances.)

=== Detailed ===
==== 2020s ====
===== 2025 =====
Results of the 2025 legislative election held on 18 May 2025:

Party		Votes	%	Seats
Chega	CH	20,447	28.38%	1
Socialist Party	PS	19,536	27.12%	1
Democratic Alliance	AD	15,407	21.39%	1
Unitary Democratic Coalition	CDU	10,000	13.88%	0
LIVRE	L	1,547	2.15%	0
Liberal Initiative	IL	1,439	2.00%	0
Left Bloc	BE	1,365	1.89%	0
National Democratic Alternative	ADN	713	0.99%	0
People Animals Nature	PAN	636	0.88%	0
Portuguese Workers' Communist Party	PCTP	455	0.63%	0
React, Include, Recycle	RIR	135	0.19%	0
New Right	ND	97	0.13%	0
Volt Portugal	Volt	93	0.13%	0
Ergue-te	E	87	0.12%	0
People's Monarchist Party	PPM	84	0.12%	0
Valid votes		72,041	100.00%	3
Blank votes		1,012	1.37%	
Rejected votes – other		690	0.94%	
Total polled		73,743	62.33%	
Registered electors		118,320		

The following candidates were elected:: Pedro do Carmo (PS); Rui Cristina (CH); and Gonçalo Valente (AD).

===== 2024 =====
Results of the 2024 legislative election held on 10 March 2024:

Party		Votes	%	Seats
Socialist Party	PS	24,408	32.59%	1
Chega	CH	16,595	22.16%	1
Democratic Alliance	AD	12,890	17.21%	1
Unitary Democratic Coalition	CDU	11,570	15.45%	0
Left Bloc	BE	3,393	4.53%	0
Liberal Initiative	IL	1,708	2.28%	0
LIVRE	L	1,369	1.83%	0
People Animals Nature	PAN	943	1.26%	0
National Democratic Alternative	ADN	859	1.15%	0
Portuguese Workers' Communist Party	PCTP	624	0.83%	0
React, Include, Recycle	RIR	180	0.24%	0
Volt Portugal	Volt	147	0.20%	0
New Right	ND	106	0.14%	0
Ergue-te	E	95	0.13%	0
Valid votes		74,887	100.00%	3
Blank votes		1,172	1.52%	
Rejected votes – other		935	1.21%	
Total polled		76,994	64.65%	
Registered electors		119,102		

The following candidates were elected: Nelson Brito (PS); Diva Ribeiro (CH); and Gonçalo Valente (AD).

===== 2022 =====
Results of the 2022 legislative election held on 30 January 2022:

Party		Votes	%	Seats
Socialist Party	PS	29,533	44.66%	2
Unitary Democratic Coalition	CDU	12,442	18.82%	1
Social Democratic Party	PSD	10,767	16.28%	0
Chega	CH	6,932	10.48%	0
Left Bloc	BE	2,511	3.80%	0
Liberal Initiative	IL	1,388	2.10%	0
People Animals Nature	PAN	597	0.90%	0
CDS – People's Party	CDS–PP	515	0.78%	0
LIVRE	L	491	0.74%	0
Portuguese Workers' Communist Party	PCTP	415	0.63%	0
React, Include, Recycle	RIR	156	0.24%	0
Volt Portugal	Volt	103	0.16%	0
Earth Party	PT	88	0.13%	0
Ergue-te	E	78	0.12%	0
Socialist Alternative Movement	MAS	62	0.09%	0
Portuguese Labour Party	PTP	45	0.07%	0
Valid votes		66,123	100.00%	3
Blank votes		763	1.13%	
Rejected votes – other		634	0.94%	
Total polled		67,520	56.17%	
Registered electors		120,204		

The following candidates were elected: Nelson Brito (PS); Pedro do Carmo (PS); and João Dias (CDU).

==== 2010s ====
===== 2019 =====
Results of the 2019 legislative election held on 6 October 2019:

Party		Votes	%	Seats
Socialist Party	PS	26,161	42.33%	2
Unitary Democratic Coalition	CDU	14,655	23.71%	1
Social Democratic Party	PSD	8,546	13.83%	0
Left Bloc	BE	5,833	9.44%	0
CDS – People's Party	CDS–PP	1,490	2.41%	0
Chega	CH	1,313	2.12%	0
People Animals Nature	PAN	1,269	2.05%	0
Portuguese Workers' Communist Party	PCTP	865	1.40%	0
LIVRE	L	398	0.64%	0
Liberal Initiative	IL	279	0.45%	0
Alliance	A	252	0.41%	0
National Renewal Party	PNR	200	0.32%	0
Earth Party	PT	169	0.27%	0
We, the Citizens!	NC	117	0.19%	0
People's Monarchist Party	PPM	95	0.15%	0
Democratic Republican Party	PDR	91	0.15%	0
Portuguese Labour Party	PTP	74	0.12%	0
Valid votes		61,807	100.00%	3
Blank votes		1,378	2.14%	
Rejected votes – other		1,083	1.69%	
Total polled		64,268	52.26%	
Registered electors		122,987		

The following candidates were elected: Pedro do Carmo (PS); João Dias (CDU); and Telma Guerreiro (PS).

===== 2015 =====
Results of the 2015 legislative election held on 4 October 2015:

Party		Votes	%	Seats
Socialist Party	PS	27,778	38.52%	1
Unitary Democratic Coalition	CDU	18,592	25.78%	1
Portugal Ahead	PàF	14,980	20.77%	1
Left Bloc	BE	6,105	8.47%	0
Portuguese Workers' Communist Party	PCTP	1,924	2.67%	0
People Animals Nature	PAN	598	0.83%	0
Democratic Republican Party	PDR	354	0.49%	0
United Party of Retirees and Pensioners	PURP	348	0.48%	0
National Renewal Party	PNR	274	0.38%	0
LIVRE	L	272	0.38%	0
The Earth Party Movement	MPT	246	0.34%	0
ACT! (Portuguese Labour Party and Socialist Alternative Movement)	AGIR	194	0.27%	0
People's Monarchist Party	PPM	190	0.26%	0
We, the Citizens!	NC	166	0.23%	0
Together for the People	JPP	87	0.12%	0
Valid votes		72,108	100.00%	3
Blank votes		1,232	1.65%	
Rejected votes – other		1,124	1.51%	
Total polled		74,464	57.83%	
Registered electors		128,754		

The following candidates were elected: Pedro do Carmo (PS); João Ramos (CDU); and Nilza de Sena (PàF).

===== 2011 =====
Results of the 2011 legislative election held on 5 June 2011:

Party		Votes	%	Seats
Socialist Party	PS	22,307	30.91%	1
Unitary Democratic Coalition	CDU	19,000	26.33%	1
Social Democratic Party	PSD	17,710	24.54%	1
CDS – People's Party	CDS–PP	5,463	7.57%	0
Left Bloc	BE	3,890	5.39%	0
Portuguese Workers' Communist Party	PCTP	1,980	2.74%	0
Party for Animals and Nature	PAN	532	0.74%	0
National Renewal Party	PNR	306	0.42%	0
The Earth Party Movement	MPT	255	0.35%	0
People's Monarchist Party	PPM	232	0.32%	0
Portuguese Labour Party	PTP	201	0.28%	0
Hope for Portugal Movement	MEP	191	0.26%	0
Humanist Party	PH	93	0.13%	0
Valid votes		72,160	100.00%	3
Blank votes		1,695	2.26%	
Rejected votes – other		1,013	1.35%	
Total polled		74,868	55.16%	
Registered electors		135,739		

The following candidates were elected: Luís Pita Ameixa (PS); Carlos Moedas (PSD); and João Ramos (CDU).

==== 2000s ====
===== 2009 =====
Results of the 2009 legislative election held on 27 September 2009:

Party		Votes	%	Seats
Socialist Party	PS	28,418	35.85%	2
Unitary Democratic Coalition	CDU	23,665	29.85%	1
Social Democratic Party	PSD	11,889	15.00%	0
Left Bloc	BE	8,142	10.27%	0
CDS – People's Party	CDS–PP	4,655	5.87%	0
Portuguese Workers' Communist Party	PCTP	1,278	1.61%	0
The Earth Party Movement and Humanist Party	MPT-PH	254	0.32%	0
Hope for Portugal Movement	MEP	241	0.30%	0
People's Monarchist Party	PPM	178	0.22%	0
Merit and Society Movement	MMS	169	0.21%	0
National Renewal Party	PNR	138	0.17%	0
Pro-Life Party	PPV	124	0.16%	0
Workers' Party of Socialist Unity	POUS	117	0.15%	0
Valid votes		79,268	100.00%	3
Blank votes		1,223	1.50%	
Rejected votes – other		979	1.20%	
Total polled		81,470	59.35%	
Registered electors		137,275		

The following candidates were elected: Luís Pita Ameixa (PS); Fernando Medina (PS); and José Soeiro (CDU).

===== 2005 =====
Results of the 2005 legislative election held on 20 February 2005:

Party		Votes	%	Seats
Socialist Party	PS	44,556	52.16%	2
Unitary Democratic Coalition	CDU	21,036	24.63%	1
Social Democratic Party	PSD	10,730	12.56%	0
Left Bloc	BE	4,144	4.85%	0
CDS – People's Party	CDS–PP	2,562	3.00%	0
Portuguese Workers' Communist Party	PCTP	1,632	1.91%	0
New Democracy Party	ND	350	0.41%	0
Workers' Party of Socialist Unity	POUS	212	0.25%	0
National Renewal Party	PNR	197	0.23%	0
Valid votes		85,419	100.00%	3
Blank votes		1,045	1.20%	
Rejected votes – other		886	1.01%	
Total polled		87,350	62.97%	
Registered electors		138,713		

The following candidates were elected: Luís Pita Ameixa (PS); Marcos Perestrello (PS); and José Soeiro (CDU).

===== 2002 =====
Results of the 2002 legislative election held on 17 March 2002:

Party		Votes	%	Seats
Socialist Party	PS	35,814	44.44%	2
Unitary Democratic Coalition	CDU	19,911	24.71%	1
Social Democratic Party	PSD	17,449	21.65%	0
CDS – People's Party	CDS–PP	3,063	3.80%	0
Portuguese Workers' Communist Party	PCTP	1,937	2.40%	0
Left Bloc	BE	1,554	1.93%	0
People's Monarchist Party	PPM	255	0.32%	0
Workers' Party of Socialist Unity	POUS	236	0.29%	0
The Earth Party Movement	MPT	192	0.24%	0
Humanist Party	PH	173	0.21%	0
Valid votes		80,584	100.00%	3
Blank votes		753	0.92%	
Rejected votes – other		911	1.11%	
Total polled		82,248	58.07%	
Registered electors		141,634		

The following candidates were elected: Rui Cunha (PS); Rodeia Machado (CDU); and Luís Miranda (PS).

==== 1990s ====
===== 1999 =====
Results of the 1999 legislative election held on 10 October 1999:

Party		Votes	%	Seats
Socialist Party	PS	39,729	47.70%	2
Unitary Democratic Coalition	CDU	24,080	28.91%	1
Social Democratic Party	PSD	12,310	14.78%	0
CDS – People's Party	CDS–PP	3,313	3.98%	0
Portuguese Workers' Communist Party	PCTP	1,664	2.00%	0
Left Bloc	BE	1,314	1.58%	0
People's Monarchist Party	PPM	395	0.47%	0
The Earth Party Movement	MPT	277	0.33%	0
National Solidarity Party	PSN	210	0.25%	0
Valid votes		83,292	100.00%	3
Blank votes		853	1.00%	
Rejected votes – other		870	1.02%	
Total polled		85,015	58.51%	
Registered electors		145,288		

The following candidates were elected: Rui Cunha (PS); Rodeia Machado (CDU); and Gavino Paixão (PS).

===== 1995 =====
Results of the 1995 legislative election held on 1 October 1995:

Party		Votes	%	Seats
Socialist Party	PS	44,168	46.64%	2
Unitary Democratic Coalition	CDU	28,178	29.75%	1
Social Democratic Party	PSD	15,125	15.97%	1
CDS – People's Party	CDS–PP	3,495	3.69%	0
Portuguese Workers' Communist Party	PCTP	2,173	2.29%	0
Popular Democratic Union	UDP	992	1.05%	0
Revolutionary Socialist Party	PSR	570	0.60%	0
Valid votes		94,701	100.00%	4
Blank votes		620	0.64%	
Rejected votes – other		1,147	1.19%	
Total polled		96,468	63.88%	
Registered electors		151,016		

The following candidates were elected: Teresa Patrício de Gouveia (PSD); Agostinho Moleiro (PS); António Saleiro (PS); and José Soeiro (CDU).

===== 1991 =====
Results of the 1991 legislative election held on 6 October 1991:

Party		Votes	%	Seats
Unitary Democratic Coalition	CDU	29,429	31.32%	2
Social Democratic Party	PSD	28,308	30.13%	1
Socialist Party	PS	27,470	29.24%	1
Revolutionary Socialist Party	PSR	2,314	2.46%	0
Social Democratic Centre Party	CDS	2,245	2.39%	0
Portuguese Workers' Communist Party	PCTP	1,828	1.95%	0
National Solidarity Party	PSN	990	1.05%	0
Democratic Renewal Party	PRD	790	0.84%	0
People's Monarchist Party	PPM	366	0.39%	0
Democratic Party of the Atlantic	PDA	216	0.23%	0
Valid votes		93,956	100.00%	4
Blank votes		1,005	1.04%	
Rejected votes – other		1,763	1.82%	
Total polled		96,724	63.36%	
Registered electors		152,651		

The following candidates were elected: Mendes Bota (PSD); Lourdes Hespanhol (CDU); Helena Torres Marques (PS); and Miguel Urbano Rodrigues (CDU).

==== 1980s ====
===== 1987 =====
Results of the 1987 legislative election held on 19 July 1987:

Party		Votes	%	Seats
Unitary Democratic Coalition	CDU	39,592	39.88%	3
Social Democratic Party	PSD	25,121	25.31%	1
Socialist Party	PS	20,742	20.89%	1
Democratic Renewal Party	PRD	5,868	5.91%	0
Social Democratic Centre Party	CDS	2,011	2.03%	0
Revolutionary Socialist Party	PSR	1,101	1.11%	0
Popular Democratic Union	UDP	1,098	1.11%	0
Portuguese Workers' Communist Party	PCTP	1,024	1.03%	0
Portuguese Democratic Movement	MDP	914	0.92%	0
Communist Party (Reconstructed)	PC(R)	714	0.72%	0
Christian Democratic Party	PDC	691	0.70%	0
People's Monarchist Party	PPM	392	0.39%	0
Valid votes		99,268	100.00%	5
Blank votes		1,521	1.49%	
Rejected votes – other		1,614	1.58%	
Total polled		102,403	67.65%	
Registered electors		151,377		

The following candidates were elected: Álvaro Barreto (PSD); Manuel Filipe (CDU); Helena Torres Marques (PS); Cláudio Percheiro (CDU); and Bernardina Sebastião (CDU).

===== 1985 =====
Results of the 1985 legislative election held on 6 October 1985:

Party		Votes	%	Seats
United People Alliance	APU	50,814	46.26%	3
Socialist Party	PS	22,805	20.76%	1
Social Democratic Party	PSD	15,532	14.14%	1
Democratic Renewal Party	PRD	13,127	11.95%	0
Social Democratic Centre Party	CDS	2,471	2.25%	0
Popular Democratic Union	UDP	1,438	1.31%	0
Revolutionary Socialist Party	PSR	1,351	1.23%	0
Christian Democratic Party	PDC	648	0.59%	0
Portuguese Workers' Communist Party	PCTP	623	0.57%	0
Communist Party (Reconstructed)	PC(R)	592	0.54%	0
Workers' Party of Socialist Unity	POUS	455	0.41%	0
Valid votes		109,856	100.00%	5
Blank votes		1,182	1.04%	
Rejected votes – other		2,205	1.95%	
Total polled		113,243	75.06%	
Registered electors		150,877		

The following candidates were elected: Álvaro Barreto (PSD); Helena Torres Marques (PS); Francisco Miguel (APU); Belchior Pereira (APU); and Bernardina Sebastião (APU).

===== 1983 =====
Results of the 1983 legislative election held on 25 April 1983:

Party		Votes	%	Seats
United People Alliance	APU	56,986	51.29%	3
Socialist Party	PS	32,265	29.04%	2
Social Democratic Party	PSD	13,545	12.19%	0
Social Democratic Centre Party	CDS	4,719	4.25%	0
Popular Democratic Union	UDP	980	0.88%	0
Socialist Workers League	LST	933	0.84%	0
Revolutionary Socialist Party	PSR	585	0.53%	0
Portuguese Workers' Communist Party	PCTP	412	0.37%	0
Christian Democratic Party	PDC	361	0.32%	0
Workers' Party of Socialist Unity	POUS	316	0.28%	0
Valid votes		111,102	100.00%	5
Blank votes		953	0.83%	
Rejected votes – other		3,228	2.80%	
Total polled		115,283	78.47%	
Registered electors		146,909		

The following candidates were elected: Luís Cacito (PS); Manuel Masseno (PS); Francisco Miguel (APU); Belchior Pereira (APU); and José Soeiro (APU).

===== 1980 =====
Results of the 1980 legislative election held on 5 October 1980:

Party		Votes	%	Seats
United People Alliance	APU	57,988	48.46%	3
Democratic Alliance	AD	27,619	23.08%	1
Republican and Socialist Front	FRS	25,996	21.72%	1
Workers' Party of Socialist Unity	POUS	2,058	1.72%	0
Revolutionary Socialist Party	PSR	1,693	1.41%	0
Popular Democratic Union	UDP	1,589	1.33%	0
Portuguese Workers' Communist Party	PCTP	1,114	0.93%	0
Labour Party	PT	1,022	0.85%	0
Christian Democratic Party, Independent Movement for the National Reconstruction / Party of the Portuguese Right and National Front	PDC- MIRN/ PDP- FN	593	0.50%	0
Valid votes		119,672	100.00%	5
Blank votes		885	0.72%	
Rejected votes – other		2,589	2.10%	
Total polled		123,146	84.35%	
Registered electors		145,989		

The following candidates were elected: António Duarte Chagas (AD); José Carreira Marques (APU); Francisco Miguel (APU); Dinis Miranda (APU); and Trindade Reis (FRS).

==== 1970s ====
===== 1979 =====
Results of the 1979 legislative election held on 2 December 1979:

Party		Votes	%	Seats
United People Alliance	APU	63,498	52.25%	3
Socialist Party	PS	27,503	22.63%	1
Democratic Alliance	AD	23,743	19.54%	1
Popular Democratic Union	UDP	2,201	1.81%	0
Portuguese Workers' Communist Party	PCTP	1,846	1.52%	0
Revolutionary Socialist Party	PSR	1,144	0.94%	0
Left-wing Union for the Socialist Democracy	UEDS	829	0.68%	0
Christian Democratic Party	PDC	752	0.62%	0
Valid votes		121,516	100.00%	5
Blank votes		1,121	0.89%	
Rejected votes – other		2,633	2.10%	
Total polled		125,270	86.92%	
Registered electors		144,127		

The following candidates were elected: António Duarte Chagas (AD); António Azevedo Gomes (PS); José Carreira Marques (APU); Francisco Miguel (APU); and Dinis Miranda (APU)

===== 1976 =====
Results of the 1976 legislative election held on 25 April 1976:

Party		Votes	%	Seats
Portuguese Communist Party	PCP	52,839	46.09%	4
Socialist Party	PS	38,405	33.50%	2
Democratic People's Party	PPD	9,882	8.62%	0
Social Democratic Centre Party	CDS	5,004	4.36%	0
Popular Democratic Union	UDP	2,671	2.33%	0
Movement of Socialist Left	MES	2,092	1.82%	0
People's Socialist Front	FSP	1,564	1.36%	0
People's Monarchist Party	PPM	724	0.63%	0
Worker–Peasant Alliance	AOC	557	0.49%	0
Internationalist Communist League	LCI	481	0.42%	0
Re-Organized Movement of the Party of the Proletariat	MRPP	428	0.37%	0
Valid votes		114,647	100.00%	6
Rejected votes		5,478	4.56%	
Total polled		120,125	83.81%	
Registered electors		143,333		

The following candidates were elected: Luís Cacito (PS); Lopes Cardoso (PS); José Carreira Marques (PCP); Francisco Miguel (PCP); Manuel Moita (PCP); and Fernanda Peleja (PCP).
