= João Dias (politician) =

Portuguese politician (born 1973)

Member of the Assembly of the Republic
- In office 1 March 2018 – 25 March 2024
- Preceded by: João Ramos
- Constituency: Beja

Member of the Municipal Assembly of Beja
- In office 18 October 2017 – 18 October 2021

Personal details
- Born: João Manuel Ildefonso Dias; 16 July 1973 (age 52) Serpa, Portugal
- Party: Portuguese Communist Party
- Other political affiliations: Unitary Democratic Coalition
- Occupation: Nurse

João Manuel Ildefonso Dias (born 16 July 1973) is a Portuguese politician and former member of the Assembly of the Republic, the national legislature of Portugal. A communist, he represented Beja from March 2018 to March 2024.

== Early life ==
Dias was born on 16 July 1973 in Serpa. He has a degree in nursing and post-graduate qualifications in rehabilitation nursing and wound treatment and tissue viability.

== Career ==
Dias was a nurse by profession. He was a nurse at the Unidade Local de Saúde do Baixo Alentejo (ULSBA) from 1996 to 2018. He also worked at the Unidade de Cuidados Continuados do Centro de Saúde de Beja. He was a visiting assistant professor at the University of Évora (2012 to 2018), University of Coimbra (2018 to 2018) and Escola Superior de Enfermagem São José de Cluny (2015). He also taught at the Escola Superior de Saúde da Cruz Vermelha (2017) and Escola Superior de Saúde Lopes Dias (2016 to 2018). He has worked with the Portuguese Red Cross, the University of Minho and the Castelo Branco Polytechnic Institute.

Dias has been active in politics since 1996 and is a board member of the Portuguese Communist Party's Beja branch. He was a member of the municipal council in Beja from 2017 to 2021. At the 2015 legislative election Dias was placed third in the Unitary Democratic Coalition (CDU)'s list of candidates in Beja but the alliance only won a single seat in the constituency. He was appointed to the Assembly as permanent member in March 2018 following the resignation of João Ramos. He was re-elected at the 2019 and 2022 legislative elections. At the 2024 legislative election Dias was placed first in the CDU's list of candidates in Beja but the alliance failed to win any seats in the constituency.

== Electoral history ==
Electoral history of João Dias
Election	Constituency	Party	Alliance	No.	Result
2015 legislative	Beja	Portuguese Communist Party	Unitary Democratic Coalition	3	Not elected
2017 local	Beja Municipal Assembly	Portuguese Communist Party	Unitary Democratic Coalition	1	Elected
2019 legislative	Beja	Portuguese Communist Party	Unitary Democratic Coalition	1	Elected
2022 legislative	Beja	Portuguese Communist Party	Unitary Democratic Coalition	1	Elected
2024 legislative	Beja	Portuguese Communist Party	Unitary Democratic Coalition	1	Not elected

== Personal life ==
Dias is married to Lina Maria Sousa dos Santos Dias.
