= Castle of Aljustrel =

Medieval castle in Aljustrel, Beja, Portugal

- Castelo de Aljustrel
- Beja, Baixo Alentejo, Alentejo in Portugal
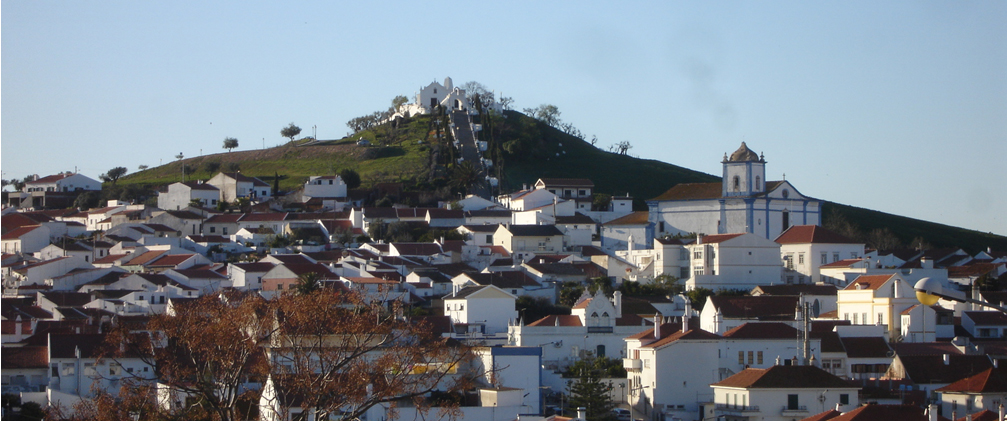
- Remains of the Castle of Aljustrel on top of the hill

Site information
- Type: Castle
- Owner: Portuguese Republic
- Open to the public: Public

Location
- Coordinates: 37°52′53″N 8°10′2″W

Site history
- Materials: Masonry, Taipa

The Castle of Aljustrel (Portuguese: Castelo de Aljustrel) is a Portuguese medieval castle in civil parish of Aljustrel e Rio de Moinhos, in the municipality of Aljustrel, in the district of Beja.

== History ==
Dominating the mountaintop of the territory of the Baixo Alentejo, the walls that encompass Aljustrel were once occupied since the Neolithic and Chalcolithic, with the latter evidence in the fragments of flint and ceramics discovered at the site. This primary phase was succeeded by a hiatus, and there are no materials leading to a proto-historic or Roman period of occupation.

It is unclear when the structure was used in a military capacity, but there are suggestions that it began during the late Muslim occupation, around the 13th century, at the time of the fortress of Alcácer do Sal. Sometime between the 8th and 12th century, the castle was built by Arab inhabitants using taipa construction, possibly in the location of a fortified Romanized castro. An archaeological investigation revealed materials dating until the 9th century, that attest to the importance of the castle to the Muslim civilization in the southwest part of the peninsula.

The reconquest of Aljustrel by Portuguese forces, 1234, marked the beginning of a new era for the castle. In 1235, King D. Sancho II of Portugal donated the fortifications to the Order of Santiago, which was later sanctioned by his successor, King D. Afonso III in 1255. The castle was not the only fortification to be added to the immediate defensive lines, many of the Muslim strongholds along the Algarve were incorporated into the Crown's possessions, including the mines at Aljustrel. The presence of D. Paio Peres Correia, Master of the Order of Santiago was, therefore, not unusual to the wider expansion of the Kingdom, since it became a staging ground for further attacks to the south, during the 13th century. There are no records of what changes were made to the castle by Christian forces during this period. Shortly following, with the conquest of the Algarve, Aljustrel lost much of its important strategic relevance and the fort began to fall into ruin. Little remained of the walls, except the local name (derived from the Arabic) and the Christian church that was established nearby.

== Architecture ==
The castle is situated on an isolated hilltop, some 247 metres (810 ft) above sea level, dominated by a panoramic view of the nearby landscape, near the Church of Nossa Senhora do Castelo.

There are few traces of the foundations, in masonry stone, nor of the original taipa construction left by the Arab settlers. Most of the older Muslim foundations are located in the northwest, southeast and northeast quadrants, while part of the wall that bisects the stairs are part of the later castle structure.
