= Alvalade (Santiago do Cacém) =

- Civil parish
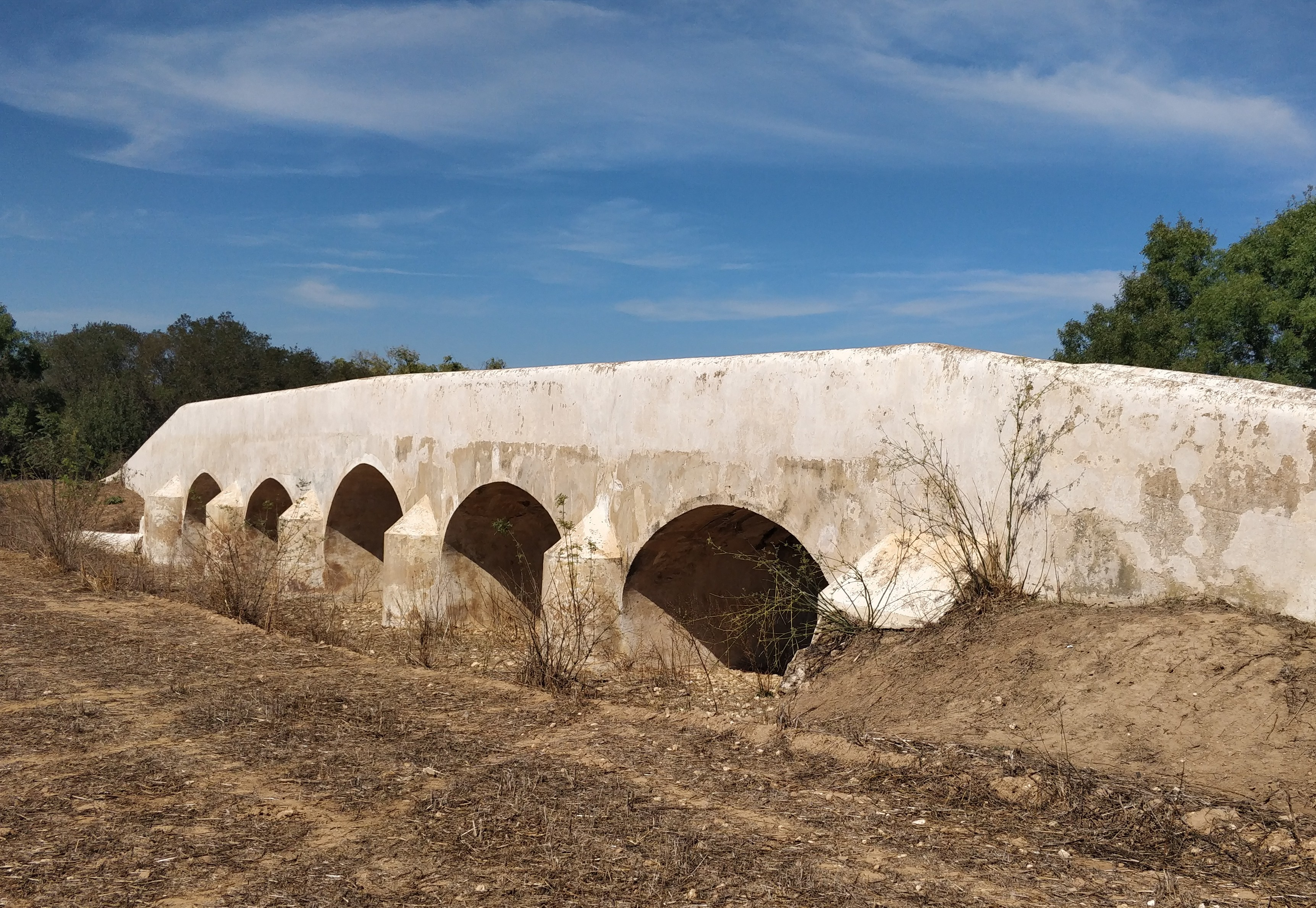
- Medieval bridge at Alvalade

- Location in Portugal
- Coordinates: 37°55′59″N 8°23′30″W
- Country: Portugal
- Region: Alentejo
- Intermunic. comm.: Alentejo Litoral
- District: Setúbal
- Municipality: Santiago do Cacém

Area
  - Total: 161.12 km^{2} (62.21 sq mi)

Population (2021)
  - Total: 1,803
  - Density: 11.19/km^{2} (28.98/sq mi)
- Time zone: UTC+00:00 (WET)
  - Summer (DST): UTC+01:00 (WEST)
- Website: freguesia-alvalade.pt

Alvalade, from the Arabic al-balat, is a parish in the municipality of Santiago do Cacém in the Setúbal District of Portugal. It also forms part of Alentejo Litoral. In the 2021 census it had 1803 inhabitants.

== History ==
In 1801, Alvalade had 1,321 inhabitants. Until 1834, it was a county seat consisting of the parishes of Alvalade and Nossa Senhora do Roxo. It belonged, between 1834 and 1855, to the municipality of Messejana and, between 1855 and 1871, to the municipality of Aljustrel. In 1755 the town, in common with much of southern Portugal, suffered badly from the Lisbon Earthquake.

In 1234 Alvalade can be considered to have definitively become Portuguese land after the invading Moors were defeated. In 1273 Alvalade was donated to the Military Order of Saint James of the Sword by Afonso III of Portugal. On 20 September 1510 King Manuel I granted a foral (town charter) to Alvalade.

Following the Liberal Wars (1828-1834) in Portugal, with the Liberal faction loyal to Dom Pedro IV) emerging victorious, the Liberals took over the national government and carried out a drastic redesign of the country's administrative structure. The reform of November 1836 not only abolished the municipality of Alvalade, integrating it into the municipality of Messejana, but also removed its town title. In March of the same year, the mayor of Alvalade protested to the government against an accusation, by a resident of Messejana, that the people of Alvalade had sided with Dom Miguel against his brother, Dom Pedro. On 1 June 1934 Miguel spent his last night on Portuguese soil after the wars, leaving Alvalade to make for the port of Sines and a British ship waiting to take him into exile. The removal of Alvalade's town title can thus be seen as retribution by the Liberals.

There was a 2nd administrative reform in 1855 and the municipality of Messejana was integrated into Aljustrel, but Alvalade, faced with the refusal to restore its previous status, chose to be annexed to Santiago do Cacém, despite its greater distance. The town title was symbolically returned to Alvalade in 1995.

== Transport and communications ==
The town was not to get its first telephone until 1 April 1959. Alvalade is served by two national roads EN 261 and 262. It is close to the IC1 (Lisbon / Algarve tollway), which has an exit for Alvalade that provides access to the Alentejo and Algarve Atlantic coast, with seaside towns such as Vila Nova de Milfontes. The town is also well served by bus networks.

== Climate ==
Alvalade has a hot summer mediterranean climate (Köppen: Csa), with mild and wet winters and hot dry summers. The highest temperature ever recorded was 46.1 °C (115.0 °F) on 4 August 2018.

Climate data for Alvalade (1991-2020)
Month	Jan	Feb	Mar	Apr	May	Jun	Jul	Aug	Sep	Oct	Nov	Dec	Year
Record high °C (°F)	23.0 (73.4)	25.6 (78.1)	30.8 (87.4)	36.2 (97.2)	39.6 (103.3)	44.7 (112.5)	45.1 (113.2)	46.1 (115.0)	43.7 (110.7)	36.9 (98.4)	28.7 (83.7)	25.1 (77.2)	46.1 (115.0)
Mean daily maximum °C (°F)	15.8 (60.4)	17.2 (63.0)	20.1 (68.2)	21.9 (71.4)	25.6 (78.1)	29.6 (85.3)	32.3 (90.1)	32.9 (91.2)	30.1 (86.2)	25.4 (77.7)	19.6 (67.3)	16.5 (61.7)	23.9 (75.1)
Daily mean °C (°F)	9.7 (49.5)	10.6 (51.1)	13.1 (55.6)	15.0 (59.0)	18.2 (64.8)	21.4 (70.5)	23.4 (74.1)	23.8 (74.8)	21.5 (70.7)	18.1 (64.6)	13.4 (56.1)	10.7 (51.3)	16.6 (61.8)
Mean daily minimum °C (°F)	3.5 (38.3)	4.0 (39.2)	6.1 (43.0)	8.0 (46.4)	10.7 (51.3)	13.2 (55.8)	14.4 (57.9)	14.6 (58.3)	13.0 (55.4)	10.9 (51.6)	7.2 (45.0)	4.9 (40.8)	9.2 (48.6)
Record low °C (°F)	−8.4 (16.9)	−7.2 (19.0)	−4.4 (24.1)	−1.0 (30.2)	2.5 (36.5)	6.7 (44.1)	8.7 (47.7)	7.9 (46.2)	4.7 (40.5)	1.6 (34.9)	−3.1 (26.4)	−5.5 (22.1)	−8.4 (16.9)
Average precipitation mm (inches)	63.0 (2.48)	48.5 (1.91)	52.5 (2.07)	53.7 (2.11)	33.3 (1.31)	7.8 (0.31)	0.8 (0.03)	2.3 (0.09)	23.0 (0.91)	67.8 (2.67)	74.6 (2.94)	83.1 (3.27)	510.4 (20.1)
Average precipitation days (≥ 1 mm)	7.9	7.0	7.0	7.2	5.1	1.2	0.3	0.5	2.9	7.1	8.0	8.9	63.1
Source: Instituto Português do Mar e da Atmosfera

== Places of interest ==
- Medieval Bridge of Alvalade (Ponte sobre a ribeira de Campilhas)

== People from Alvalade ==
- Aurea, Portuguese singer
