= Medieval Bridge of Alvalade =

Bridge in Portugal

Medieval Bridge of Alvalade Ponte Medieval de Alvalade
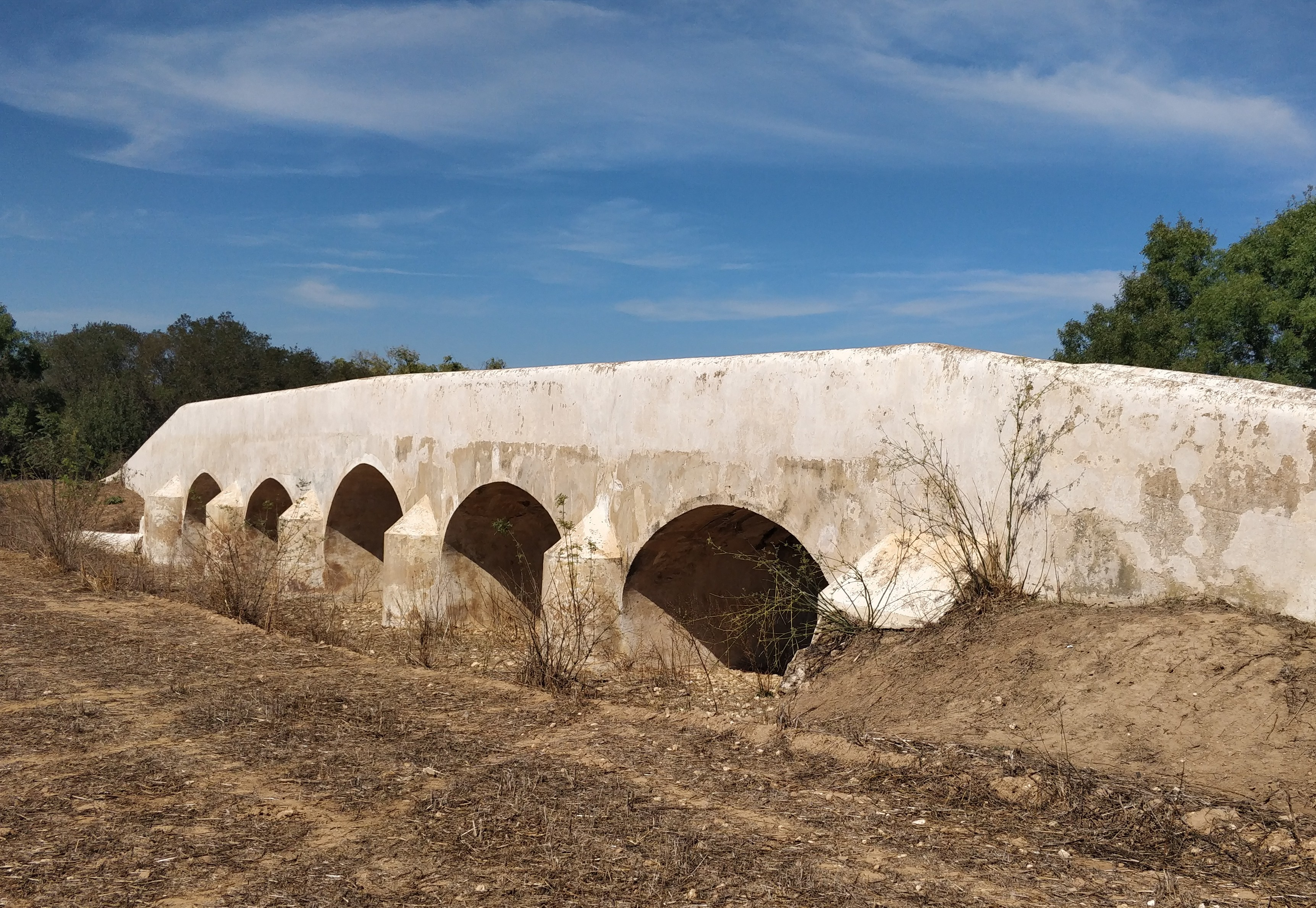
- Coordinates: 37°53′19″N 8°25′05″W
- Locale: Alvalade, Santiago do Cacém, Setúbal District, Portugal
- Official name: Ponte sobre a Ribeira de Campilhas
- Heritage status: Immovable Cultural Heritage of Municipal Interest

Characteristics
- No. of spans: 5

History
- Designer: Roman with extensive remodelling

The Medieval Bridge of Alvalade or, more properly, the Bridge over the Campilhas River (Portuguese: Ponte sobre a Ribeira de Campilhas), is in the parish of Alvalade in the Santiago do Cacém municipality in the Setúbal District of Portugal. Its origins are believed to be Roman, although this has been disputed.

== History ==
The bridge is believed to have been part of a road system that, since the Roman occupation of Portugal, connected the city of Miróbriga, close to modern-day Santiago do Cacém, and Pax Julia in the modern-day municipality of Beja, passing through Metallum Vispascense, the present-day Aljustrel. It is no longer used to cross the river. The bridge has always been known as the "Roman bridge" but different opinions have emerged in the last two decades regarding its origins. While some believe that it is a Roman bridge that underwent major works in the 16th century, others believe that it only goes back to the 17th century.

The bridge was restored in 2001. This work revealed an important landmark owned by the Order of Santiago, which was located next to the bridge, together with a stone block attached to the upper part of the side wall, which would have been used by the bridge's users to sharpen instruments. The work carried out included cleaning, deforestation, and regularization of the basin corresponding to the level of the old river bed, as well as the placement of stonework on each end of the bridge. Unfortunately, during the restoration the opportunity was not taken to carry out a detailed archaeological study.
