= Nilza =

Nilza is a given name. Notable people with the name include:

- Nilza de Sena (born 1976), Portuguese university professor and politician
- Nilza Wangmo (born c. 1979), Indian restaurant owner
