= Fernanda Peleja Patrício =

Portuguese feminist, teacher and politician

Member of the Assembly of the Republic of Portugal
- In office 1976–1979
- Parliamentary group: Portuguese Communist Party
- Constituency: Beja

Member of the Constituent Assembly of Portugal
- In office 1975–1976

Personal details
- Born: 5 October 1929 Aljustrel, Portugal
- Died: 8 October 2000 (Aged 71) Coimbra, Portugal
- Party: Portuguese: Portuguese Communist Party
- Spouse: João Francisco Rosa
- Children: Maria Eunice Patrício Rosa

Fernanda Peleja Patrício (1929 – 2000) was a Portuguese communist who opposed the country's Estado Novo regime. After the overthrow of the Estado Novo, she served on the Constituent Assembly of Portugal and in the first legislature of the Assembly of the Republic.

== Early life ==
Fernanda Peleja Patrício was born in Aljustrel in the Alentejo region of Portugal, on 5 October 1929. She was born in the neighbourhood built to house the miners working for the Aljustrel mine. Her father was one of the founders of the mineworkers' union. She had six siblings. She became a primary school teacher in 1950, but was suspended in 1959 for her opposition to the regime and prevented from teaching again until the Estado Novo was overthrown by the Carnation Revolution in 1974.

== Political activities ==
Patrício became a leader of the Movimento Democrático de Mulheres (Women's Democratic Movement - MDM), an association created in 1968 by groups opposed to the Estado Novo. As a member of the Portuguese Communist Party (PCP), she was elected to the Constituent Assembly in April 1975, representing the Beja District. The Assembly had the function of developing a new constitution for Portugal and she intervened on the topic of the rights of women at a time when it was clear that there were divergent views among the members. The Constituent Assembly was followed, in 1976, by the First National Assembly of Portugal's Second Republic, to which Patrício was also elected.

Patrício returned to teaching in 1980 in the municipality of Almodôvar in the Alentejo. However, soon after, she was elected as a full-time councillor in the Aljustrel City Council. She served as president of the Aljustrel council between 1986 and 1989. In 1987 she founded an MDM choral group for the Alentejo and she also organized a theatre group in Aljustrel. In poor health, she retired in 1994 and went to live with her daughter in Coimbra, where she died on 8 October 2000.

== Awards and honours ==
- In 2001, Patrício was posthumously awarded the Municipal Gold Medal of Merit from Aljustrel.
- A street is named after her in Aljustrel.
