= Alvalade (disambiguation) =

Alvalade is a freguesia (civil parish) in the municipality of Lisbon, Portugal.

Alvalade may also refer to:

- Alvalade (Santiago do Cacém), a freguesia (civil parish) in the Santiago do Cacém Municipality, Alentejo
- Estádio José Alvalade (1956), a former multi-purpose stadium in Lisbon, Portugal, home to Sporting Clube de Portugal
- Estádio José Alvalade, the new football stadium of Sporting Clube de Portugal
- Alvalade (Lisbon Metro), a station on the green Line of the Lisbon Metro
