= Messejana =

Settlement in Alentejo region, Portugal

- Civil parish
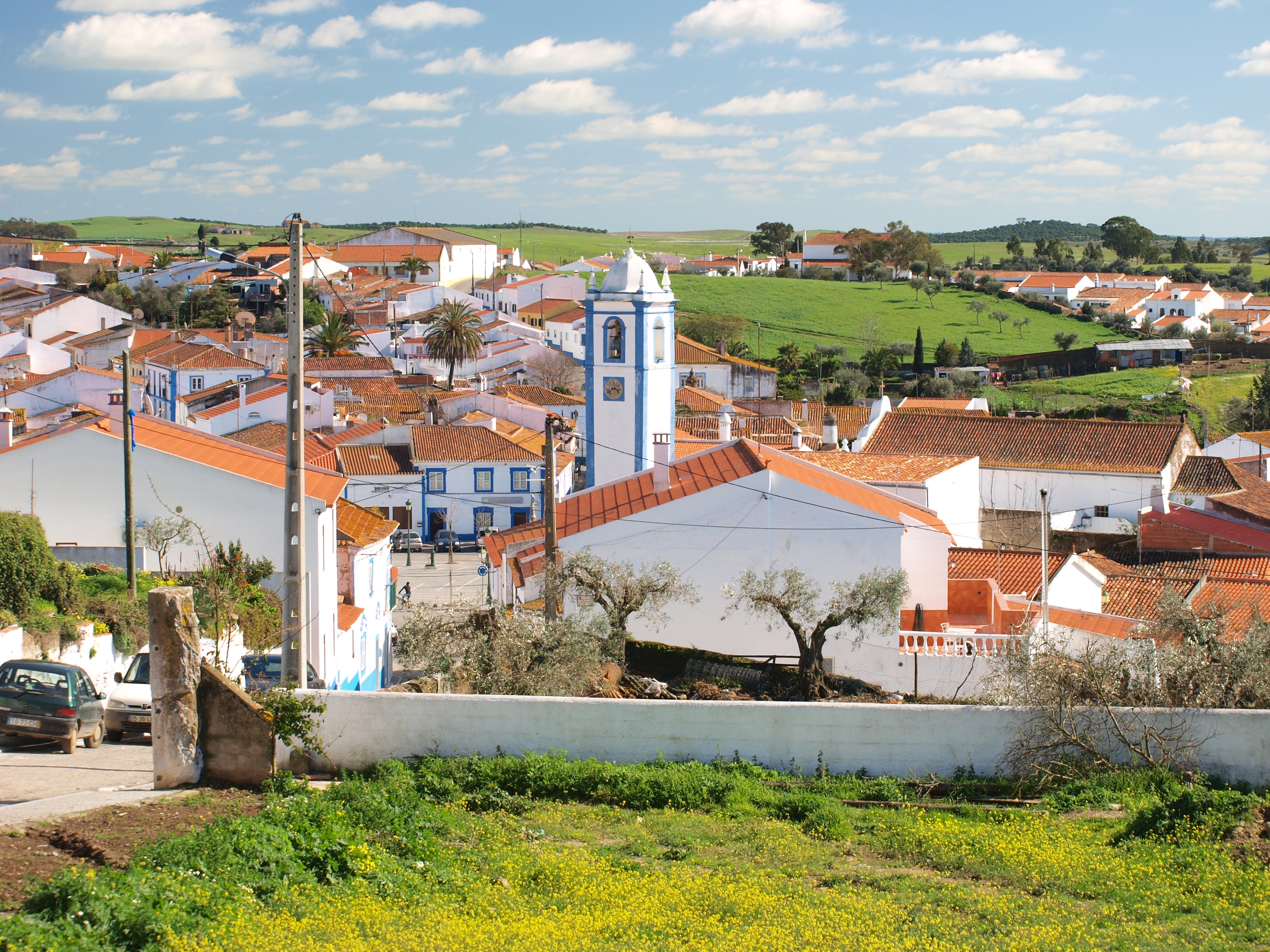
- View of Messejana

- Location in Portugal
- Coordinates: 37°49′58″N 8°14′34″W
- Country: Portugal
- Region: Alentejo
- Intermunic. comm.: Alentejo Litoral
- District: Beja
- Municipality: Aljustrel

Area
  - Total: 113.77 km^{2} (43.93 sq mi)

Population (2021)
  - Total: 811
  - Density: 7.13/km^{2} (18.5/sq mi)
- Time zone: UTC+00:00 (WET)
  - Summer (DST): UTC+01:00 (WEST)
- Website: mun-aljustrel.pt

Messejana is a Portuguese parish in the municipality of Aljustrel, in the Portuguese district of Beja. It has an area of 113.77 km^{2} and in the 2021 census had 811 inhabitants.

== History ==
The name originated from the Arabic word masjana, which means prison. The date of the town's foundation is unknown. Retaken from the Moors by Dom Sancho II in 1235, it received the status of municipality from Dom Dinis but this status was nullified on 24 October 1855. Dom Dinis restored his castle in 1288 and donated the town to the Military Order of Saint James of the Sword. Messejana received a foral or town charter from D. Manuel I on 1 July 1512.

Dom João III donated the town to Dom João da Silva. He was succeeded by his grandson Dom Lourenço da Silva, who built the convent for Franciscan friars and the Church of Misericórdia between 1566 and 1570. Dom Lourenço da Silva died with five brothers in northern Morocco in 1578, in the Battle of Alcácer Quibir, described as Portugal's greatest military disaster. At one time Messejana had 11 churches: currently there are only four, some having been damaged by the 1755 Lisbon Earthquake.

== Points of interest ==
- Casa na Rua da Igreja n.º 4, Messejana
- Castle of Messejana
- Igreja da Misericórdia de Messejana
- Pelourinho de Messejana
- Horta do Anjinho

== Notable residents ==
- Francisco Colaço do Rosário (1935 - 2008), engineer and oenologist credited with doing much to promote wine production in the Alentejo.
- Maria Nobre Franco (1938 - 2015). Art gallery owner and art collector
