= Diva Ribeiro =

Portuguese politician (born 1974)

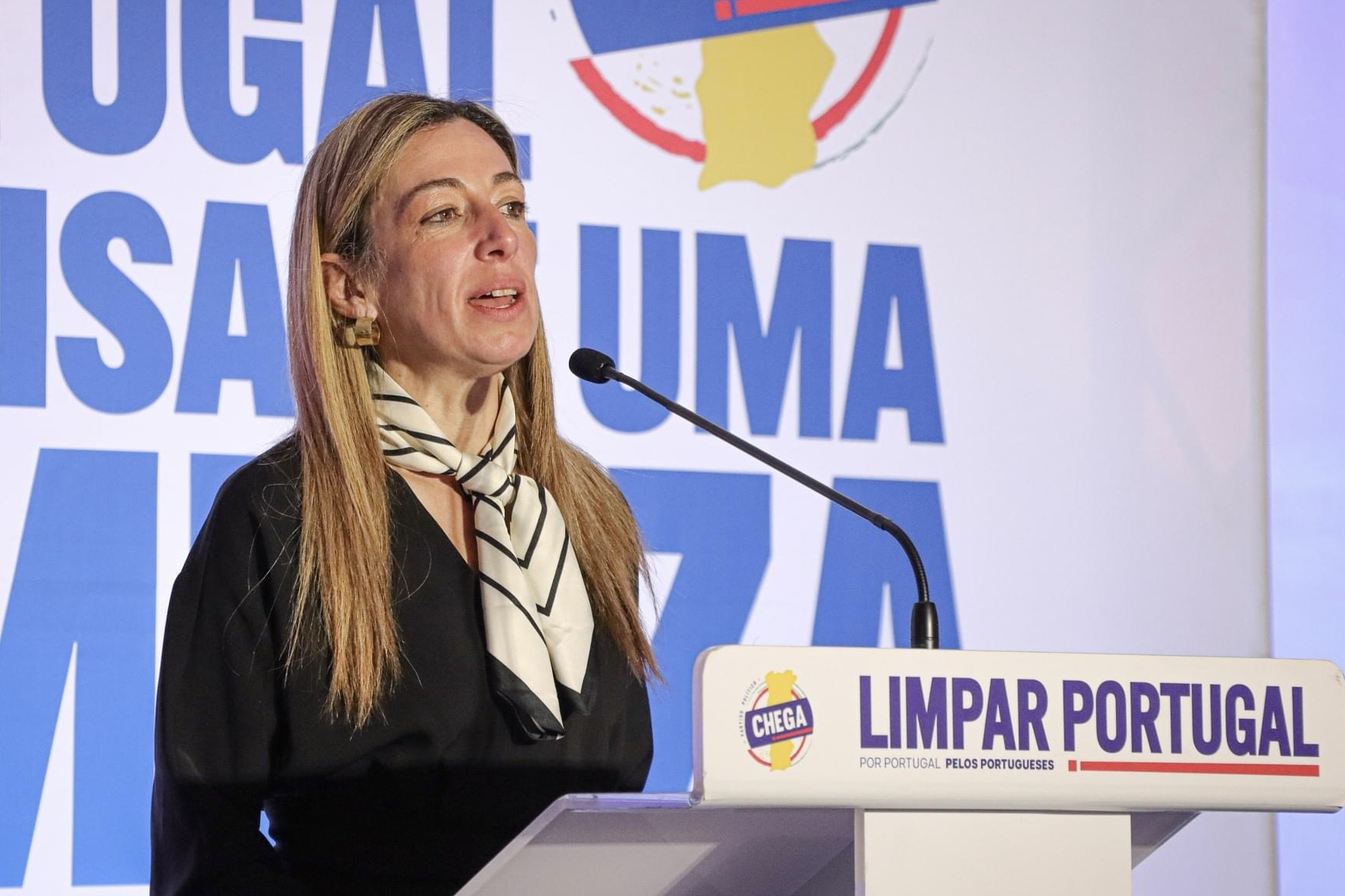

Member of the Assembly of the Republic
- In office 26 March 2024 – 18 May 2025
- Constituency: Beja

Personal details
- Born: 20 October 1974 (age 51) Beja, Alentejo, Portugal
- Party: Chega (2020–present)
- Other political affiliations: Social Democratic Party (1986–2020)
- Children: 2
- Education: University of Évora
- Occupation: Maths teacher • Politician

Diva Nélia Capela de Jesus Ribeiro (born 20 October 1974) is a Portuguese politician and a mathematics teacher. In the 2024 Portuguese national election she was elected to the Assembly of the Republic as a representative of the right-wing CHEGA party.

== Early life and career ==
Ribeiro was born in Beja on 20 October 1974. She obtained a degree in mathematics from the University of Évora and went on to teach mathematics at a private school in Vila Nova de Milfontes in the Alentejo Litoral.

== Political career ==
Ribeiro was a member of the Social Democratic Party (PSD) between 1986 and 2020, joining the JSD, the youth wing of the PSD, when she was twelve. In January 2024, it was announced by the president of CHEGA, André Ventura, that she would head the list of CHEGA candidates for the Beja constituency in the March 2024 election. CHEGA won one of the three available seats in the constituency and she was duly elected. In her campaign she had argued that central government needed to pay more attention to the needs of farmers, such as those in her district, and in the National Assembly she became a member of the Agriculture and Fisheries committee.
