= Castle of Messejana =

Medieval castle in Portugal

- Castelo de Messejana
- Beja, Baixo Alentejo, Alentejo in Portugal
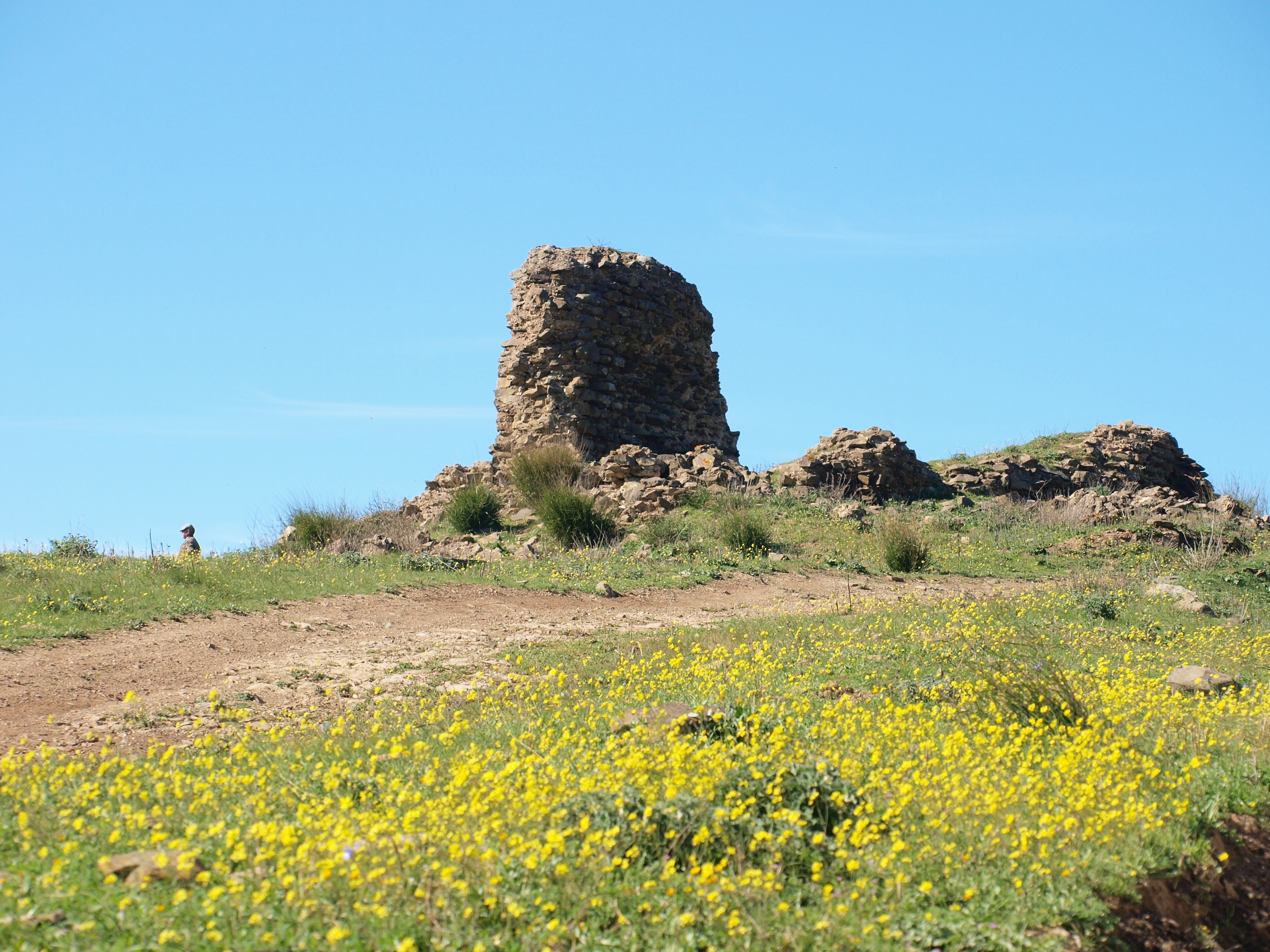
- A view of the ruins of the former castle constructed by Soudo

Site information
- Type: Castle
- Owner: Portuguese Republic
- Open to the public: Private

Location
- Coordinates: 37°50′10.9″N 8°14′46.9″W

Site history
- Built: 13th century
- Materials: Schist, Arenito, Lime mortar, Sand

The Castle of Messejana (Portuguese: Castelo de Messejana) is a Portuguese medieval castle in civil parish of Messejana, in the municipality of Aljustrel, in the district of Beja.

== History ==
Although the region was inhabited prior to the Reconquista, it was sacked in 1235 by forces loyal to King D. Sancho II. The name Messejana has its origin in the Arab masjana, that refers to prison or jail, a word derived from the verb sajana (to mean to incarcerate in prison). Proof of Arab occupation comes from excavations at the castle (1992) of silver coins, dating to the Ibn Wazir period.

During the reign of King D. Dinis (1279-1325) elevated the Messejana to the status of municipality donating the settlement to the knights of the Order of Santiago, as a way to establish a frontier in the region. The castle was constructed in 1288, under the direction of Pero Soudo.

A foral (charter) was issued by King D. Manuel I (1495-1521) on 1 July 1512, but seemed inconsequential to national security. King D. John II (1481-1495), who was sick at the time, stopped at the site between 8–9 October 1495, when he travelled to Caldas de Monchique.

During the reign of King D. John III (1521-1557), the monarch donated the territory to D. João da Silva, 6th Master of Vagos, also known as the Grande Regedor (Great Ruler). His son, D. Lourenço da Silva, succeeded him and erected, between 1566 and 1570, a Franciscan Convent in the town, and what would become known as the Church of the Misericórdia. D. Loureço, along with his five brothers, perished in the disastrous Battle of Alcácer Quibir (1578) along with D. Sebastião (1568-1578), whose mother had invited the King to Messejana in 1573.

During the context of the Portuguese Civil War (1828-1834), the Duke of Terceira was in Messejana with his military forces, where he met with his council of brigadiers on 17 July 1833. It was at this conference that the decision to take Lisbon, an operation that eventually succeeded, with the defeat of Miguelist/absolutist forces on 24 July 1833.

The municipality was extinguished on 25 October 1835 by Rodrigo da Fonseca and over time its importance continued to deteriorate, subsumed by Aljustrel in the region. For various years, the remains of the site was used as a quarry.

== Architecture ==
The castle is located in an isolated, rural hilltop on the edge of the urban community. Near the site is the parochial church of Nossa Senhora dos Remédios.

The site is dominated by vestiges of a rectangular building, encircled by three lines of fortifications in an advanced state of ruin.

In a local home, archeologists discovered an arch with inscriptions in Latin for, "In the year 1300, 26 years of age, I ended (the construction?) made by/for Pero Soudo...:

E M CCC / XXVI: ANIIS / IN FINE: M DII / PO: SOUDO / ME FEZ
