= Nilza de Sena =

Portuguese university professor and politician

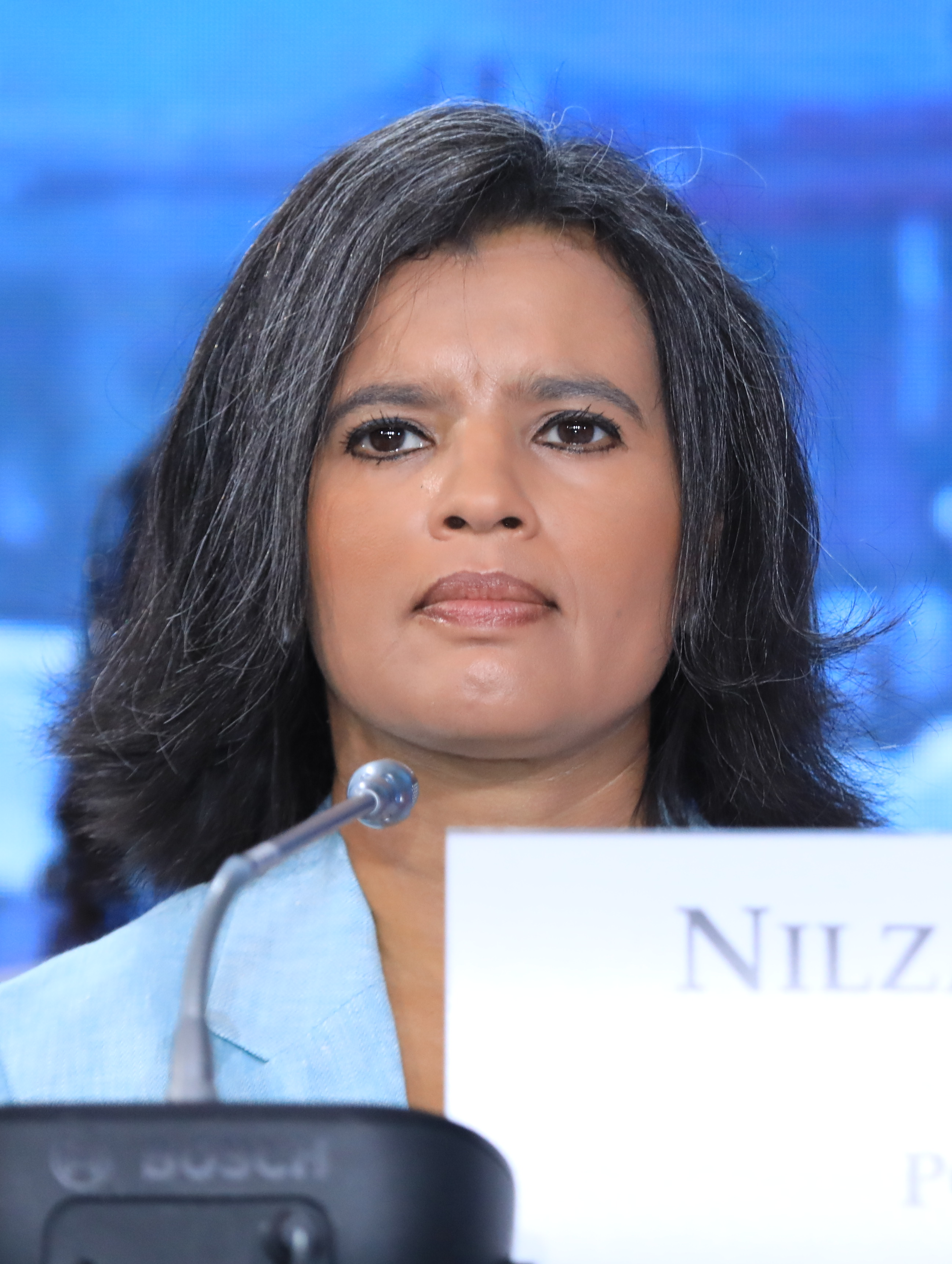

Member of the Assembly of the Republic
- In office 20 June 2011 – 24 October 2019
- Constituency: Coimbra (2011–2015); Beja (2015–2019)

Personal details
- Born: Nilza Marília Mouzinho de Sena; 21 November 1976 (age 49) Mozambique
- Party: Portuguese: Social Democratic Party
- Education: Technical University of Lisbon

Nilza Marília Mouzinho de Sena (born 21 November 1976) is a Portuguese university professor. She was a member of the Assembly of the Republic of Portugal between 2011 and 2019, representing the Social Democratic Party (PSD), initially for the Coimbra constituency and then for Beja.

== Early life ==
Nilza Marília Mouzinho de Sena has both Goan and Mozambican ancestry. She was born in Mozambique on 21 November 1976. Moving to Portugal, she graduated in 1998 in social communication at the Instituto Superior de Ciências Sociais e Políticas (Higher Institute of Social and Political Sciences - ISCSP), formerly part of the Technical University of Lisbon and now part of the University of Lisbon. She completed a master's degree in political science at the same institution in 2001 and obtained a doctorate in social sciences, specialising in sociology, in 2007.

== Academic career ==
Sena is a professor at ISCSP. She teaches in the areas of political science and communication sciences at undergraduate, master's and doctoral levels. She was a member of the Scientific Council and the Pedagogical Council of ISCSP. She is also a member of the Associação Portuguesa de Ciências da Comunicação (Portuguese Association of Science and Communication – SOPCOM).

== Political career ==
Sena was president of the Parish Assembly of Santo Condestável in Lisbon between 2005 and 2009. She was elected as a Deputy to the Assembly of the Republic in the 12th and 13th Legislatures between 2011 and 2019, as a member of the liberal-conservative Social Democratic Party (PSD). In 2011 she was on the party's list for Coimbra and in 2015 on the Beja list. In the Assembly, she was Vice-President of the Education, Science and Culture Committee.

She was a vice-president of the PSD between 2010 and 2014. A member of the Portuguese delegation to the Organization for Security and Co-operation in Europe (OSCE) from 2011, in 2016 Sena was Chair of the OSCE's Commission for Economic Affairs, Science, Technology and the Environment. A founding member of Portugal's Platform for Sustainable Growth, she has been an advisor to the Conselho Nacional de Educação (National Education Council) and to the Comissão para a Igualdade e Contra a Discriminação Racial (Committee for Equality and Opposition to Racial Discrimination - CICDR).

== Publications ==
Sena's publications include:

- Televisão e Democracia: eleições, debates e comunicação política (Television and democracy: elections, debates and other political communication products). 2011. In Joel Frederico da Silveira and Luís Marques. "Public Television Service. Challenges for the 21st Century". Serviço público de Televisão. Celta.
- A Televisão por dentro e Por (Television inside and out). 2011. Minerva, Coimbra.
- Espaço Público, Opinião e Democracia (Public Space, Opinion and Democracy). 2007. AAVV, Studies in Communication Review. University of Beira Interior.
- As regras e os equívocos do discurso politico (The rules and mistakes of political discourse). 2006. Comunicação e Marketing Político, ISCSP.
- A Interpretação Política do Debate Televisivo, 1974-1999 (The Political Interpretation of the Television Debate, 1974-1999). 2002. ISCSP.
