= Aljustrel mine =

Mine in Portugal

Mines of Aljustrel
- Location within Portugal

Location
- Location: Alentejo, Portugal; 37°52′3″N 8°9′38″W

Production
- Products: Lead, Zinc

The Mines of Aljustrel (Portuguese: Minas de Aljustel) is a zinc/lead mine situated in the civil parish of Aljustrel e Rio de Moinhos, in the municipality of Aljustrel, in the Portuguese Alentejo district of Beja. It was classified as a monument in 1982.

== History ==
With more than 80 known deposits, the Iberian Pyrite Belt became an area of intensive mining of sulphide ore since the Chalcolithic era. The Aljustrel camp consists of six separate orebodies (Estação, Feitais, Algares, Moinho, São João and Gavião) that lie on the limbs of four main SWverging folds: the Feitais anticline (towards the northeast), the Central anticline, the São João sincline and the southwestern anticline. The Aljustrel Group structures are truncated and rejected by a major northeast-southwest fault (the Messejana fault). It terminates in the northwest with a hidden by tertiary cover and constitutes the Paleozoic basement where the main two Gavião orebodies occur, with 30 metric tons (66,000 lb) of total massive sulfides.

The exploitation of metals in Aljustrel (mining and metallurgy) began at the end of the 3rd millennium BC, with tartessian mines on the hilltop of Nossa Senhora do Castelo, equidistant from iron deposits in Algares and São João do Deserto. Bronze Age excavations were situated in Mangancha, near faults close to São João. At the end of the first century, Mangancha began to be occupied by a Roman settlement, with military garrison, leading to the establishment of a colony at Vipasca, near Algares (today known as Valdoca or Vale da Oca). Mining extended into the 4th century, with production oscillating with crises in the Empire, but was eventually abandoned.

Almost all outcroppings and near-surface deposits were exhausted over the centuries and mineral prospecting began in deeper orebodies. Over time, though, pyrite became less important as a raw material in manufacturing of sulfuric acid. Combined with poor base-metal content of these deposits resulted in many mines closing over the last two decades.

The mine of ALjustrel only appeared again in the foral (charter) of 1252, where the Order of Santiago da Espada reserved their right to the profits from the mine.

A 16th century regulation, the Regulamento Mineiro de Ayres do Quintal (Ayres do Quintal Mining Regulation), mentioned the mine at Aljustrel.

By the middle of the same century, a document from King D. John III, referred to the existence of a pigment produced in the territory, known as Azul de Aljustrel (Aljustrel Blue) that was refined and sold to painters by a regal functionary.

An 1848 document attributed the first mining concession in Aljustrel to the Spaniard Sebastião Gargamala, who did little with the claim, and lost the concession.

It was later attributed to the Lusitanian Mining Company which, also, only functioned for two years. Two years later, the title was transferred to the Portuguese Companhia de Mineração Transtagana, which began an excavation on a grand scale for the next 15 years, introducing rail transport and mineral treatment in the process. Owing to a series of unfavourable conditions in the international market, the company went bankrupt and the concession was passed to the banking firm Fonseca, Santos & Vianna.

The bank became affiliated with a Belgian firm, establishing the Société Anonyme Belge des Mines d’Aljustrel that reopened the mine in 1973. It continued to operate for the next few years, taking on new partners and assuming various designations. In June 1973, it was taken over by the company Pirites Alentejanas, SARL, with a major stake by national interests (50% by the State, 40% by CUF and a fixed 10% by Mines d’Aljustrel). With the nationalization program implemented by the democratic government in 1975, the State took over 90% of the company's capital assets, with the remaining 10% held by Belgian interests.

Yet, in 1977, with discovery of the Neve-Corvo mine (worked by Somincor at the time) containing rich orebodies, lead to renewed exploration due to its economic potential.

But, owing to the fall in the price of zinc/lead, beginning in October 2008 the production at the mine was suspended. As a result, the municipal authority pushed to nationalize the concessionaire. With closing of the mine at Aljustrel, the Neves-Corvo mine became the only mine in Portugal.
