= Castle of Alcácer do Sal =

Medieval castle in Alcácer do Sal, Setúbal, Portugal

- Castelo de Alcácer do Sal
- Setúbal, Península de Setúbal, Lisboa in Portugal
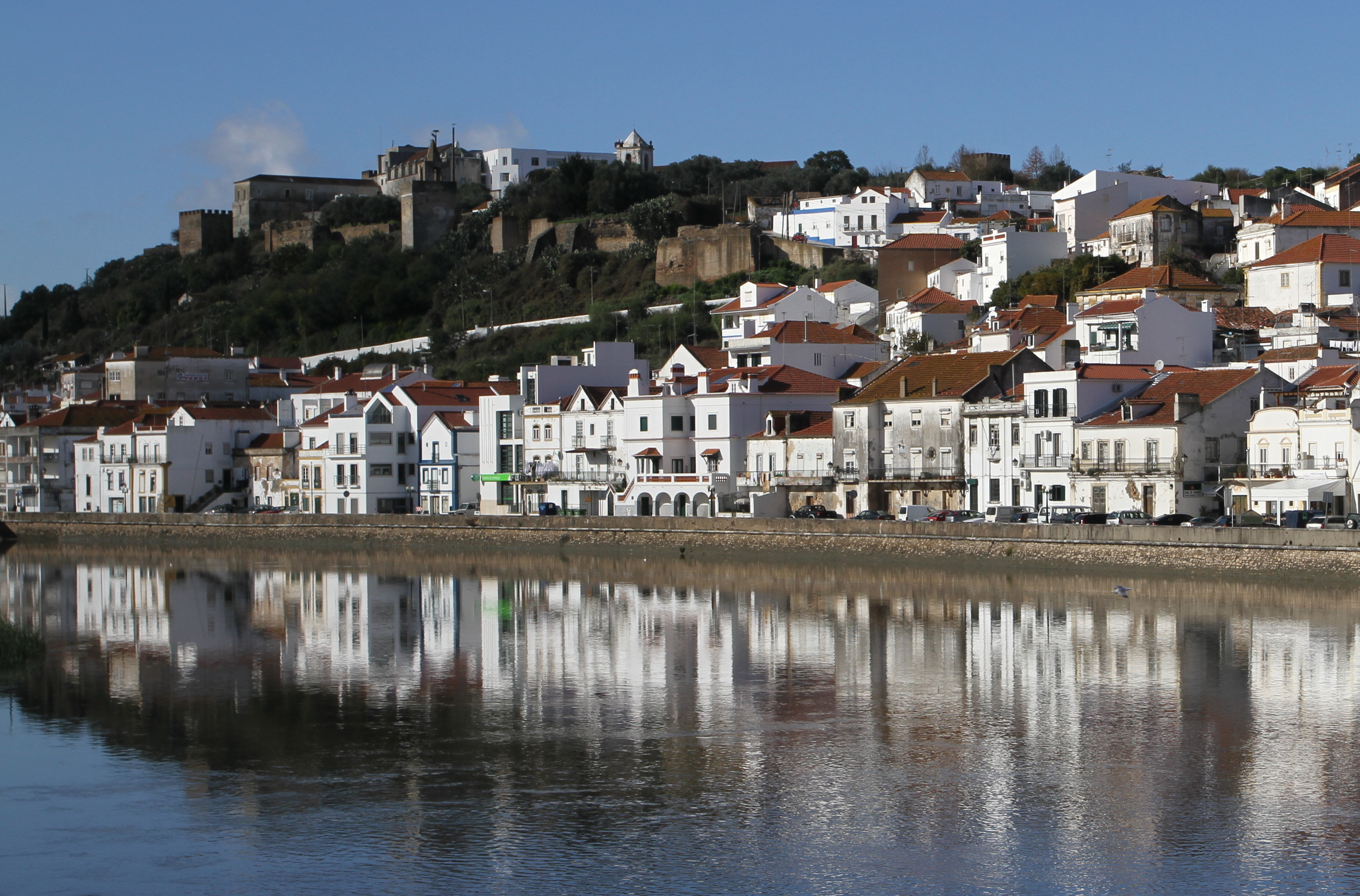
- The impetuous view of the Castle on the hilltop overlooking the town and River Sado

Site information
- Type: Castle
- Owner: Portuguese Republic
- Open to the public: Private

Location
- Coordinates: 38°22′21″N 8°30′50″W

Site history
- Built: 12th century

The Castle of Alcácer do Sal (Portuguese: Castelo de Alcácer do Sal) is a medieval castle located in the civil parish of Alcácer do Sal (Santa Maria do Castelo e Santiago) e Santa Susana, in the municipality of Alcácer do Sal, Portuguese district of Setúbal.

== History ==
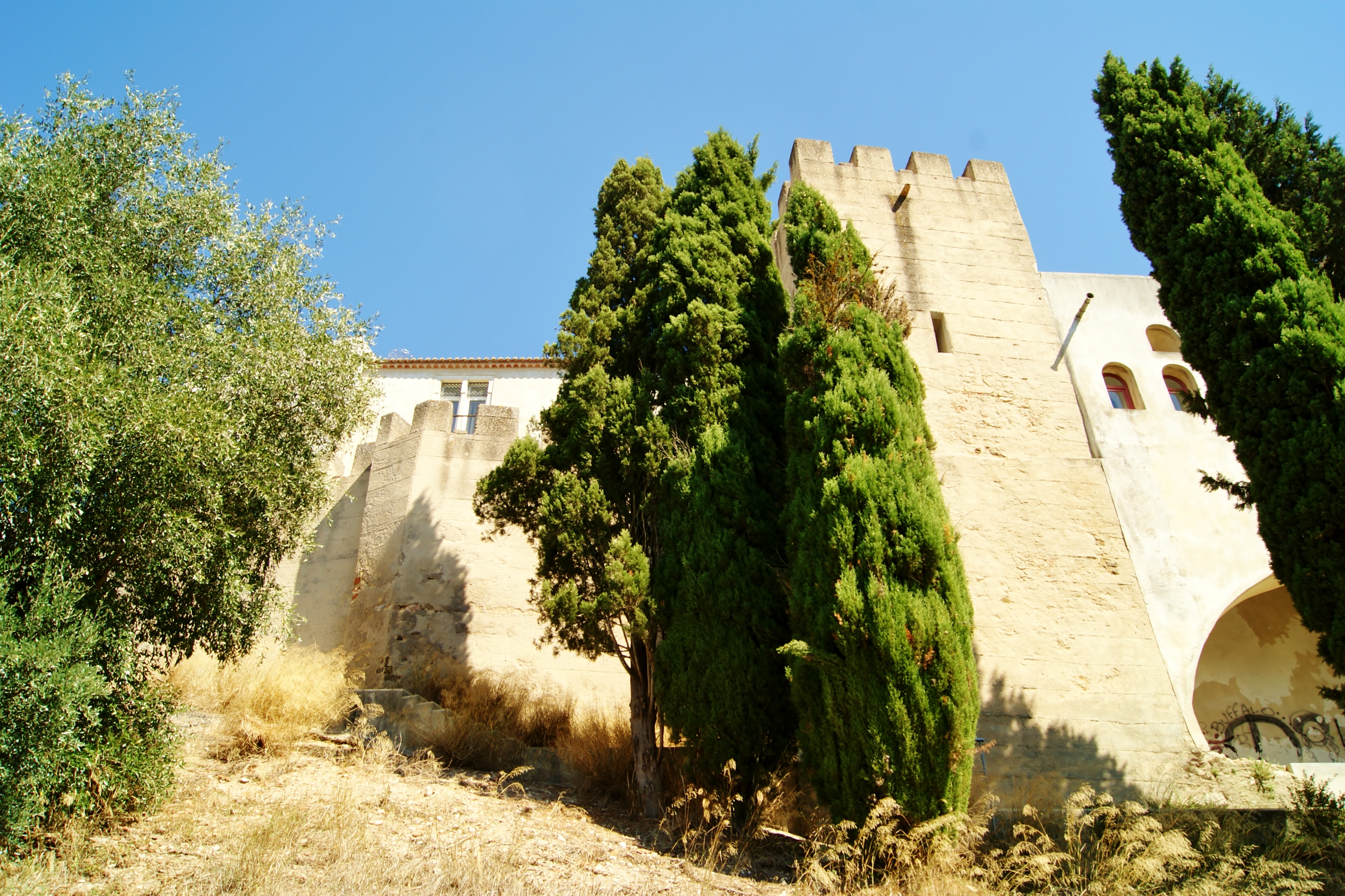
Part of the walls of the castle from the roadway to the courtyard

It predominates over the Sado valley, the hilltop on which it was implanted was successively occupied since the 6th century, becoming an important urban and military centre on the Moorish peninsula. The castle was likely constructed in the 12th century, that succeeded various older fortifications. The castle had 20 towers of more than 25 metres (82 ft) and a large keep tower, two gates along the north (including the Porta Nova in the north and the Porto de Ferro in the east). Archeological excavations occurring in the 20th century, proved that Alcácer do Sal was constructed during the Almohad Caliphate, during a period of Moorish occupation in the Iberian peninsula.

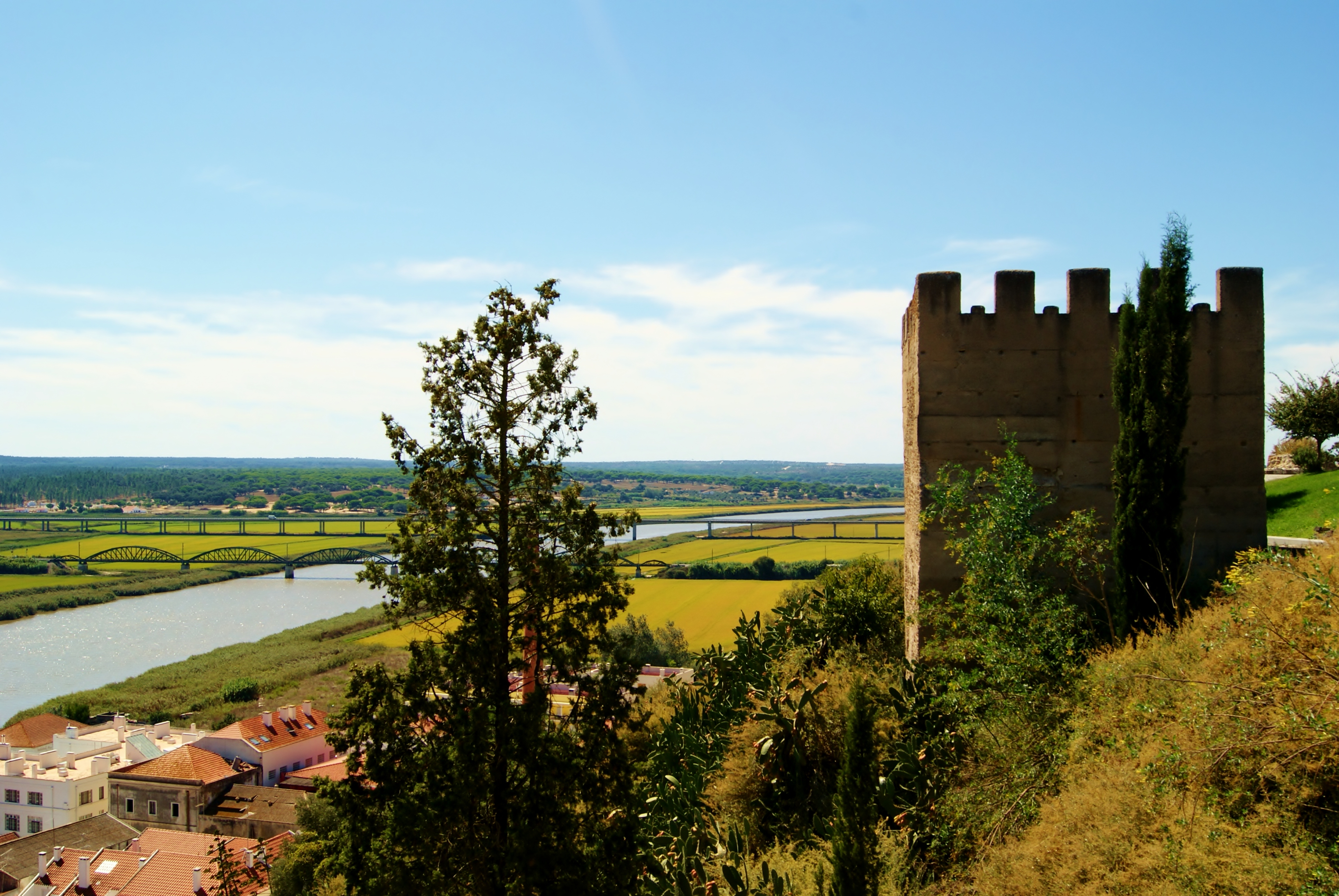
A segment of the southern wall and tower

It was conquered in 1158 by D. Afonso Henriques, but was retaken in 1191 by the Arab Moors, as evidenced by the construction of the pentagonal tower during its occupation.

It was definitively reconquered in 1217, by King D. Afonso II, who donated it to the Order of Santiago. This military religious order remained seated in Alcácer do Sal until its move to Mértola. Beginning in 1289, the castle and fortifications were rebuilt.

In 1570, Rui de Salema and his wife, D. Catarina de Souto Maior, founded the Convent of Nossa Senhora de Aracaeli, to house/shelter the sisters of Poor Clares/Order of Saint Claire. The nuns were housed in the interior of the castle in the old residences of the former Commandery of the Order of Santiago and Royal Palace.

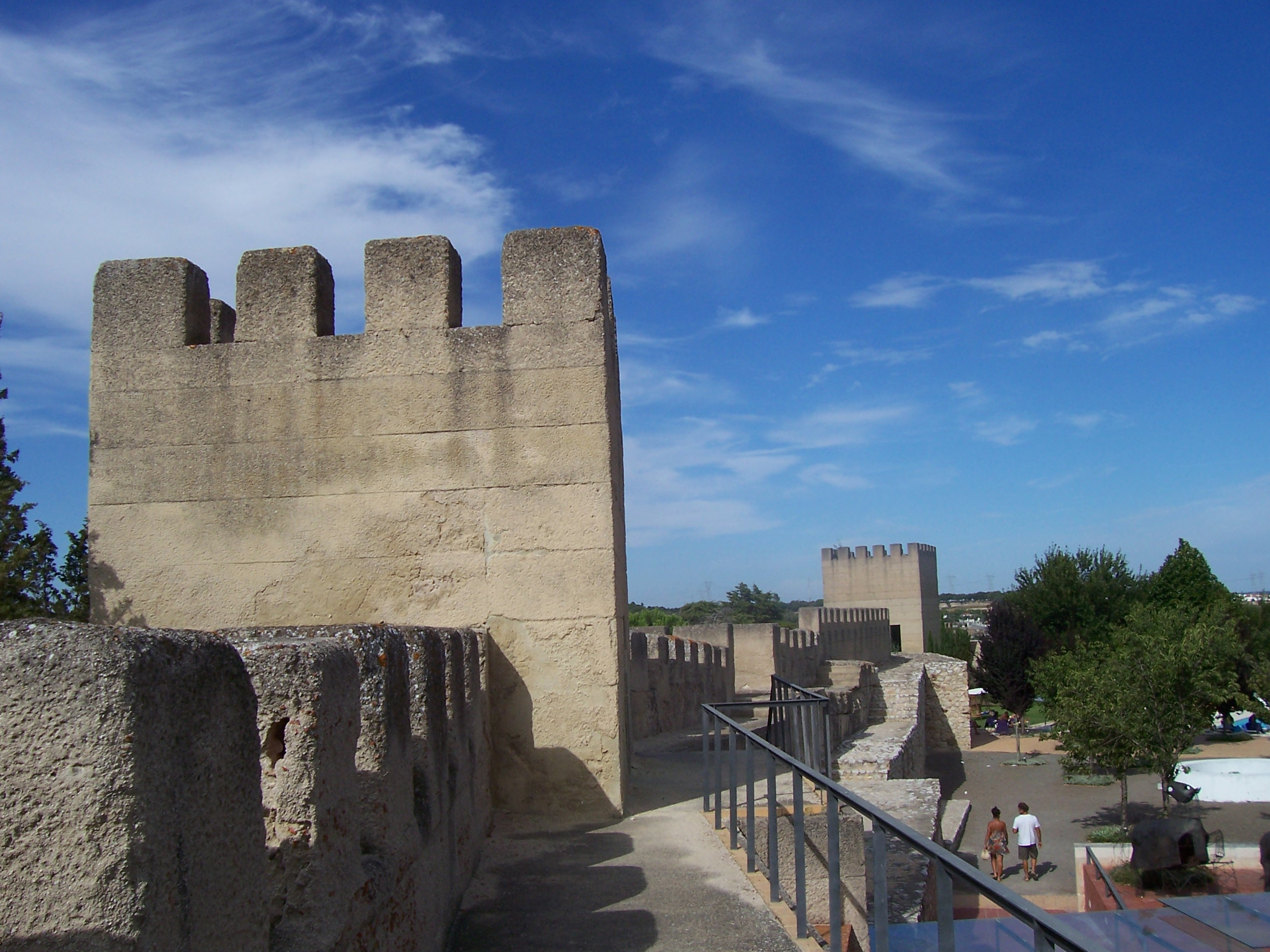
The walls along the northern part of the castle

Following an earthquake in 1969, the site was damaged. The unstable accessways along the walls were reinforced in 1971, along with repaving the foundations, filling of cracks along the parapets and the masonry (to imitate the taipa removed from the site). This was extended in 1975 to include work along the western wall of the clocktower. Between 1982 and 1983, the restoration of the adarves and battlements were undertaken, and continue the restoration of the walls and turrets. This turret was immediately reconstructed in 1985 in stone masonry, with imitation taipa. In successive years (1986, 1987 and 1988) there were recovery works: reconstruction, improvement and consolidation of the walls and turrets.

In the 1990s, work on re-covering the site and restoring the castle for use as a hostel began at this time, but was interrupted due to the discovery of an ancient Roman forum site. As a consequence, the property was taken over by the IPPAR Instituto Português do Património Arquitetónico (Portuguese Institute of Architectural Patrimony) by decree on 1 June 1992, (Decree 106F/92, Diário da República, Série 1A, 126). Nonetheless, on 16 May 1998, the hostel was inaugurated.

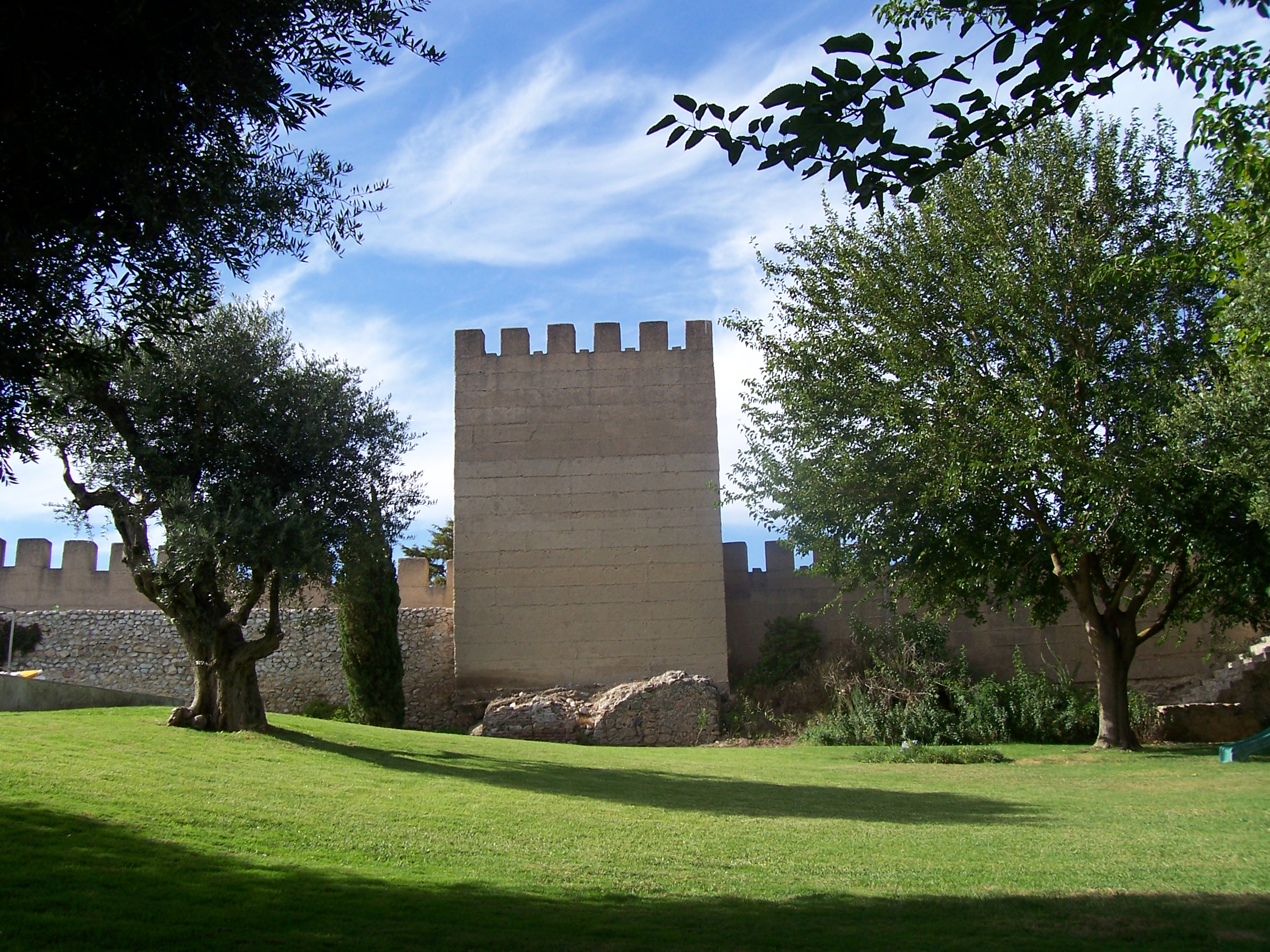
A view of the manicured gardens within the interior courtyard

A public tender was issued in 2000, to award a contract to secure and reinforce the hilltop (Diário da República, Série III, 215, 16 September). At the same time, work began on setting-up the Special Protection Zone (ZPE), by the municipal authority of Alcácer do Sal (September 2003), supplemented by a similar act on 16 May 2005. On 7 April 2009, there was a proposal made by the DRCAlentejo; as a consequence, the director of IGESPAR issued a dispatch to DRCAlentejo to reanalyze the proposal for the ZPE. This move resulted in a new proposal for the ZPE on 25 October 2010 by DRCAlentejo. On 15 December, SPAA National Council for Culture agreed with the proposal defined by the new ZPE. Over time, though, the ZPE's limits was expanded on 7 December 2012 (Diário da República, Série 2, 237, announcement 13758/2012).

The first major work on the site occurred along the south wall in 1958: the masonry and taipa was demolished (those areas in ruin). The masonry was reconstructed until the foundations and support taipa, in the areas around site. The walls to the north were consolidate in 1963, resulting in the demolition in the wall area, that involved re-pavement and repair of the parapets, using stone from the site. Similar work on the western walls were undertaken in 1966, along with repair of the roof and other elements of the walls, that continued to 1967 along the south wall. Between 1969 and 1970, portions of the church were re-roofed, along with the structure's base in reinforced concrete, the internal walls and sections of the cloister, in addition to conservation of the walls near the church.

== Architecture ==
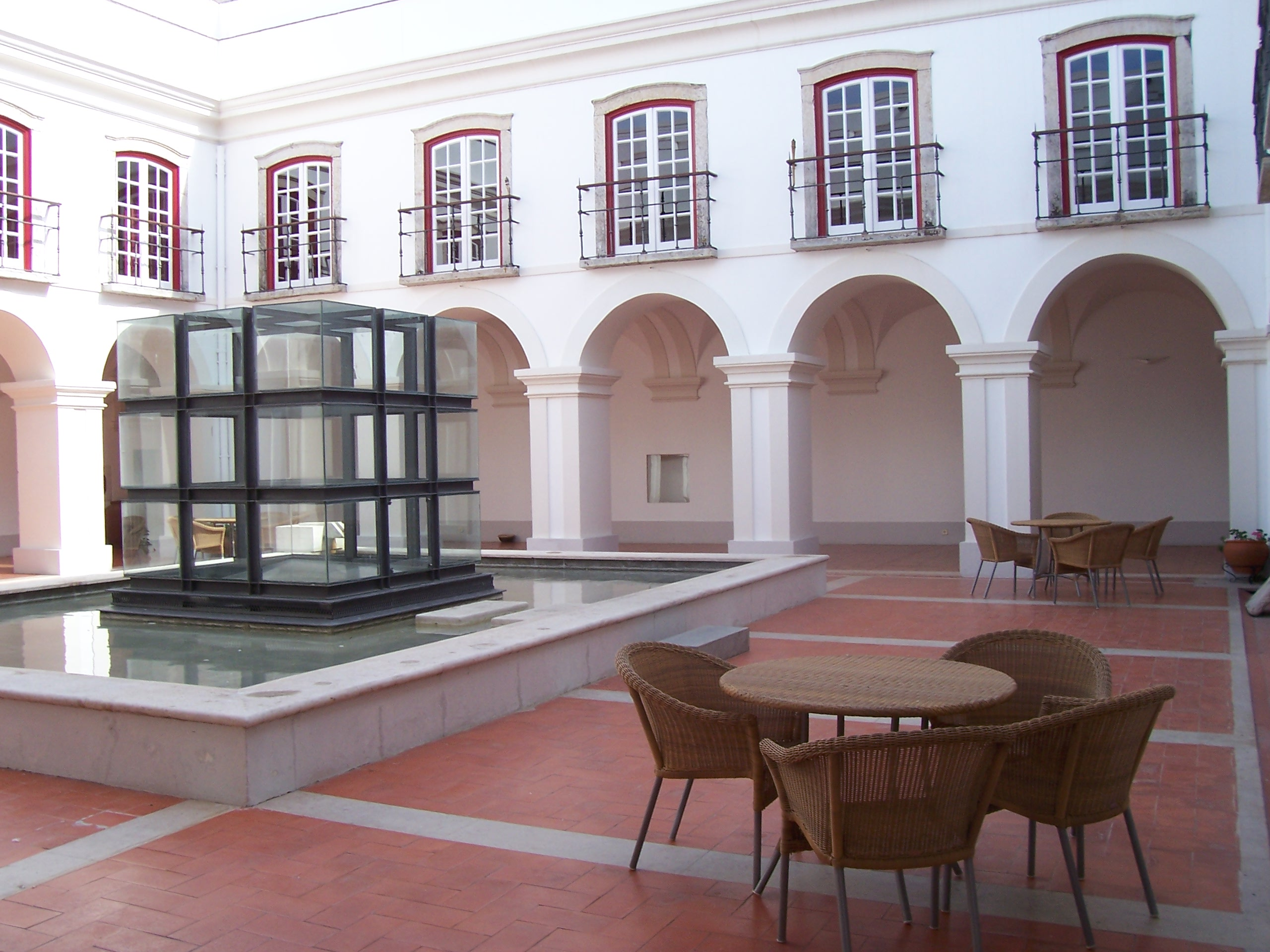
A view of the modern encroaching on the ancient: the cloister of the castle

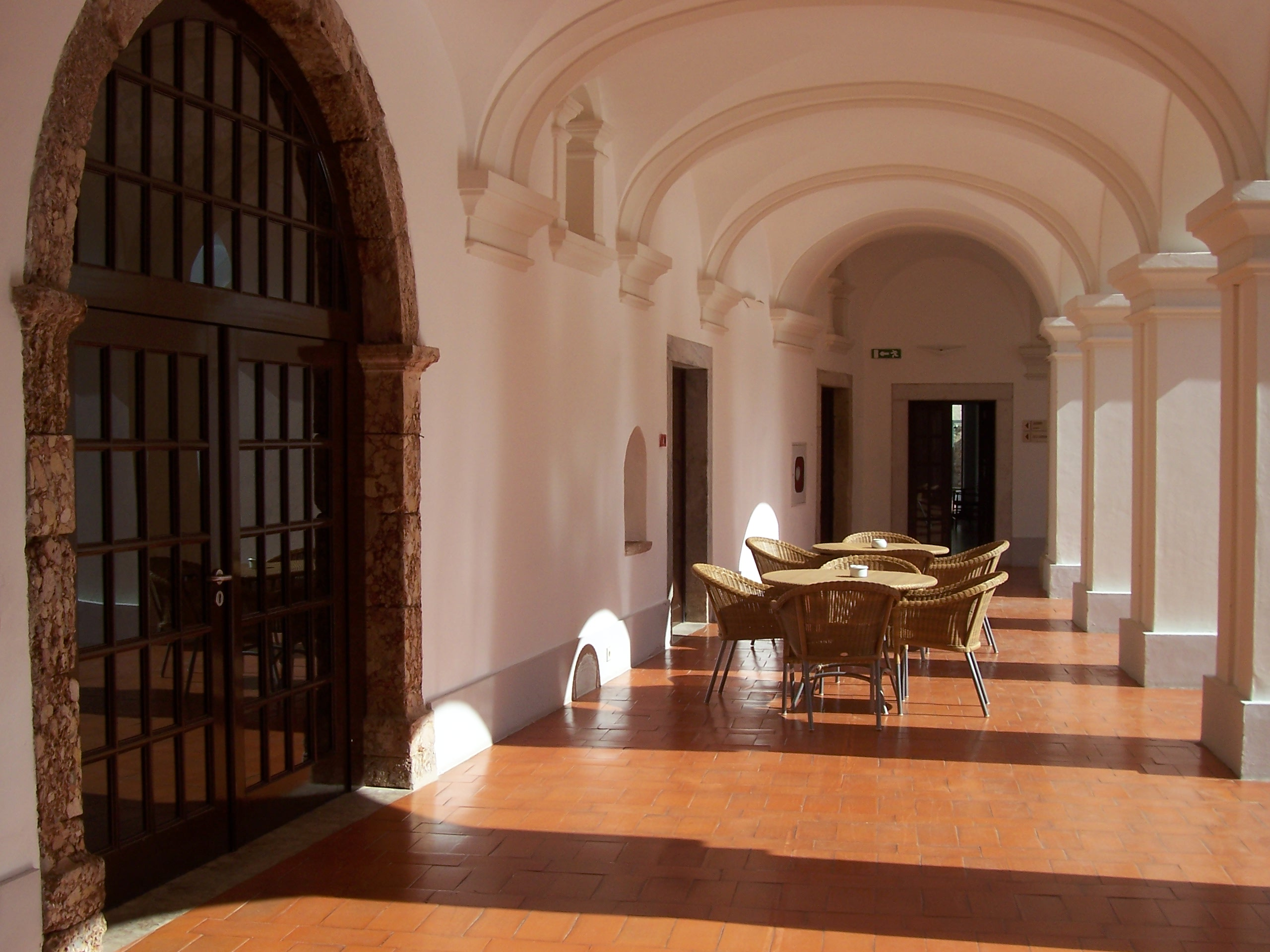
The Romanticised interiors of the Pousada (hostel)

The castle is located on a hilltop on the edge of the rural area of Alcácar do Sal, isolated over the town, river and adjacent terrains. Within the courtyard of the castle is the Church of Santa Maria do Castelo.

The irregular plan includes two lines of differentiated walls, intermixed with towers located at irregular intervals. The walls spread over the cliffs, to the north and south. The north walls and towers, with adarve encircling it, are decorated by rectangular merlons. In the northeast, at the extreme circuit, is the Tower of Algipe, with a square base transformed into octagonal by four triangular slopes. In the extreme northwest are two taller towers that flank a line of walls broken by vaulted arch and surmounted by smaller central arches. In the south are the remains of another wall and part of the towers, with a southwestern tower with clock tower.

Within the walls along the northwest wall, as the ruins of the Convent of Nossa Senhora da Aracaeli, that are connect by archways and flanked by towers. The church, with double choir is a unique, rectangular nave without roof, and rectangular presbytery decorated with pinnacles. To the north, alongside the cloister centred on a two-storey wings, encircled by rounded arches over pilasters, with upper-story framed windows. The convent and church open to the castle courtyard.
