= José Carreira Marques =

Portuguese politician (1943–2021)

Mayor of Beja
- In office January 1983 – October 2005

Member of the Constituent Assembly of Portugal
- In office 1975–1976

Member of the Assembly of the Republic of Portugal
- In office 1976–1983

Personal details
- Born: José Manuel da Costa Carreira Marques; 25 August 1943 Falagueira, Amadora, Portugal
- Died: 6 August 2021 (aged 77) Évora, Portugal
- Party: PCP

José Manuel da Costa Carreira Marques (25 August 1943 – 6 August 2021) was a Portuguese politician.

== Biography ==
Marques was born in Falagueira, Amadora on 25 August 1943. He moved to Beja at the age of 15, where he lived for the remainder of his life. He served in Angola during the Portuguese Colonial War.

Marques became a member of the Portuguese Communist Party (PCP) following the Carnation Revolution in 1974 and was elected to the Constituent Assembly of Portugal. He then served in the Assembly of the Republic from 1976 to 1982. During his time in the Assembly, he served on the Portuguese parliamentary commission on the Council of Europe. He was elected as Mayor of Beja, a position he held from January 1983 to October 2005, successfully arranging coalitions for the PCP. He was considered one of the most prominent communist politicians in Alentejo. In his last term of office, he was involved in a controversy when the city accused journalist Paulo Barriga of committing a crime when he criticized Marques for being an autocrat. Barriga was acquitted in 2007 when a judge ruled that his freedom of expression was guaranteed in the Constitution.

From September 2009 to October 2010, Marques served as executive director of the Conservatório Regional do Baixo Alentejo. He also chaired the supervisory board of the National Association of Portuguese Municipalities from 1986 to 1989. He sat on the General Council of the Beja Airport.

José Carreira Marques died of cardiac arrest on 6 August 2021, at the age of 77. He had been hospitalized in Évora for about a week due to diabetes and kidney problems. His coffin was cremated in Ferreira do Alentejo and a funeral procession was held in Beja. Following his death, the Municipality of Beja declared three days of mourning. The PCP, as well as the Federação do Baixo Alentejo do Partido Socialista paid tribute to him.

== Publications ==
- Crónicas de Ocasião (2001)
- (In)certos Instantes (2001)
- Sol Incendiado (2005)
- Cristal da Pele: poemas por dentro das mãos (2008)
