= João Ramos =

Brazilian footballer

Personal information
- Full name: João Pedro Ramos Oliveira Lima
- Date of birth: 15 February 2003 (age 23)
- Place of birth: Brasília, Brazil
- Height: 1.85 m (6 ft 1 in)
- Position: Centre-back

Team information
- Current team: São José-SP
- Number: 4

Youth career
- 2018–2023: Grêmio

Senior career*
| Years | Team | Apps | (Gls) |
| 2024 | São Bernardo | 13 | (0) |
| 2025– | São José-SP | 28 | (1) |
| 2025 | → Ferroviária (loan) | 6 | (0) |
| 2026 | → Piauí (loan) | 6 | (0) |
- * Club domestic league appearances and goals as of 19:59, 11 July 2026 (UTC)

João Pedro Ramos Oliveira Lima (born 15 February 2003), known as João Ramos, is a Brazilian footballer who plays as a centre-back for São José-SP.

== Career ==
Born in Brasília, Federal District, João Ramos joined Grêmio's youth setup in 2018, after being spotted in his hometown. He only played one senior match with the club, a 4–0 Copa FGF home routing of Real SC where he scored twice, as they only fielded a B-team.

On 28 November 2023, João Ramos moved to São Bernardo for the upcoming season. A backup during the 2024 Campeonato Paulista, he started to feature with the side in the 2024 Série C.

On 11 February 2025, João Ramos was announced at São José-SP. On 10 April, he was loaned to Série B side Ferroviária until November.

Back to Águia do Vale for the 2026 season, João Ramos was regularly used before being loaned out to Série D team Piauí on 29 April of that year.

== Career statistics ==
As of 11 July 2026

| Club | Season | League | | | State League | | Cup | | Continental | | Other | | Total | |
| Club | Season | Division | Apps | Goals | Apps | Goals | Apps | Goals | Apps | Goals | Apps | Goals | Apps | Goals |
|---|---|---|---|---|---|---|---|---|---|---|---|---|---|---|
| Grêmio | 2023 | Série A | 0 | 0 | 0 | 0 | — | | — | | 1 (Note: Appearance(s) in Copa FGF) | 2 | 1 | 2 |
| São Bernardo | 2024 | Série C | 13 | 0 | 0 | 0 | — | | — | | — | | 13 | 0 |
| São José-SP | 2025 | Paulista A2 | — | | 9 | 0 | — | | — | | — | | 9 | 0 |
| São José-SP | 2026 | Paulista A2 | — | | 19 | 1 | — | | — | | 0 | 0 | 19 | 1 |
| São José-SP | Total | | — | | 28 | 1 | — | | — | | 0 | 0 | 28 | 1 |
| Ferroviária (loan) | 2025 | Série B | 6 | 0 | — | | — | | — | | — | | 6 | 0 |
| Piauí (loan) | 2026 | Série D | 6 | 0 | — | | — | | — | | — | | 6 | 0 |
| Career total | | | 25 | 0 | 28 | 1 | 0 | 0 | 0 | 0 | 1 | 2 | 54 | 3 |

== Honours ==
Grêmio

- Campeonato Gaúcho: 2023
