= Aljustrel =

- Municipality
- Town of Aljustrel
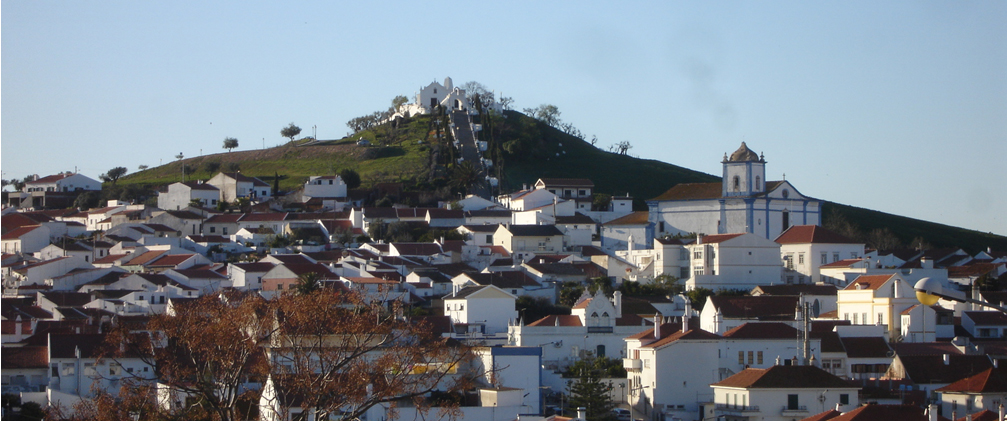
- View of Aljustrel

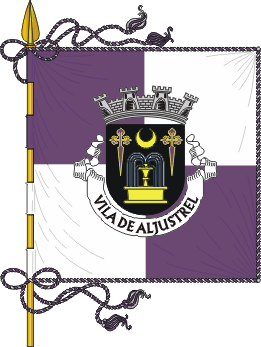
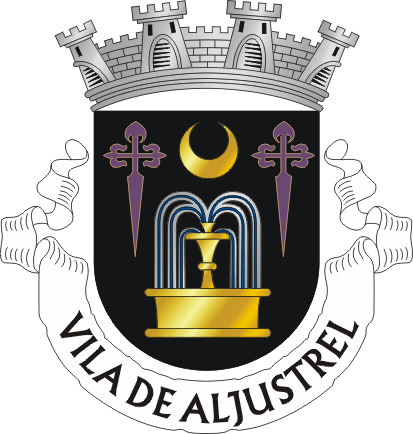
- Flag Coat of arms
- Interactive map of Aljustrel
- Location in Portugal
- Coordinates: 37°55′N 8°10′W
- Country: Portugal
- Region: Alentejo
- Intermunic. comm.: Baixo Alentejo
- District: Beja
- Parishes: 4

Government
  - President: Nelson Brito (PS)

Area
  - Total: 458.47 km^{2} (177.02 sq mi)

Population (2011)
  - Total: 9,257
  - Density: 20.19/km^{2} (52.29/sq mi)
- Time zone: UTC+00:00 (WET)
  - Summer (DST): UTC+01:00 (WEST)
- Local holiday: Saint Anthony; June 13
- Website: www.mun-aljustrel.pt

Aljustrel (Portuguese pronunciation: [alʒuʃˈtɾɛl]), officially Town of Aljustrel (Portuguese: Vila de Aljustrel), is a town and a municipality in the Portuguese district of Beja. The population in 2011 was 9,257, in an area of 458.47 km^{2}. The present mayor is Nelson Domingos Brito, elected by the Socialist Party. The municipal holiday is June 13.

== History ==
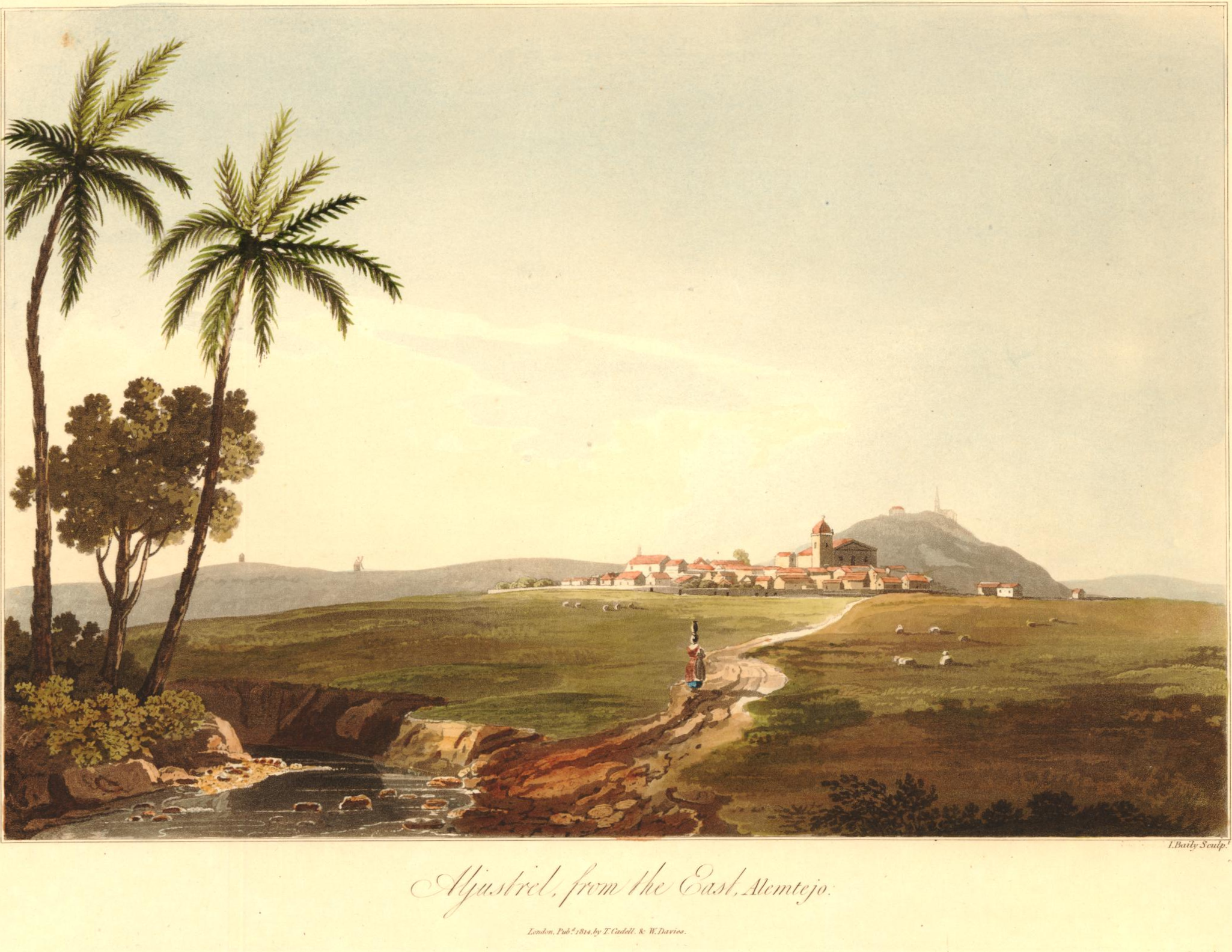
Aljustrel in 1814

During the Roman era, Aljustrel was known as Metallum Vispascense. It was occupied by the Moors but in 1235 the town was conquered from them by King D. Sancho II.

The first foral (charter) was only conceded by King Sancho in 1252.

A new foral was issued on 20 September 1510, by King D. Manuel I.

On 28 January 2013, the civil parishes of Aljustrel and Rio dos Minhos were aggregated into one local authority called Aljustrel (Decree 11-A/2013, Diário da República, Série 1, 19).

== Geography ==
Administratively, the municipality is divided into 4 civil parishes:

- Aljustrel e Rio de Moinhos
- Ervidel
- Messejana
- São João de Negrilhos

== International relations ==
Aljustrel is twinned with:

- Hem, in the département of Nord, France

== Notable people ==
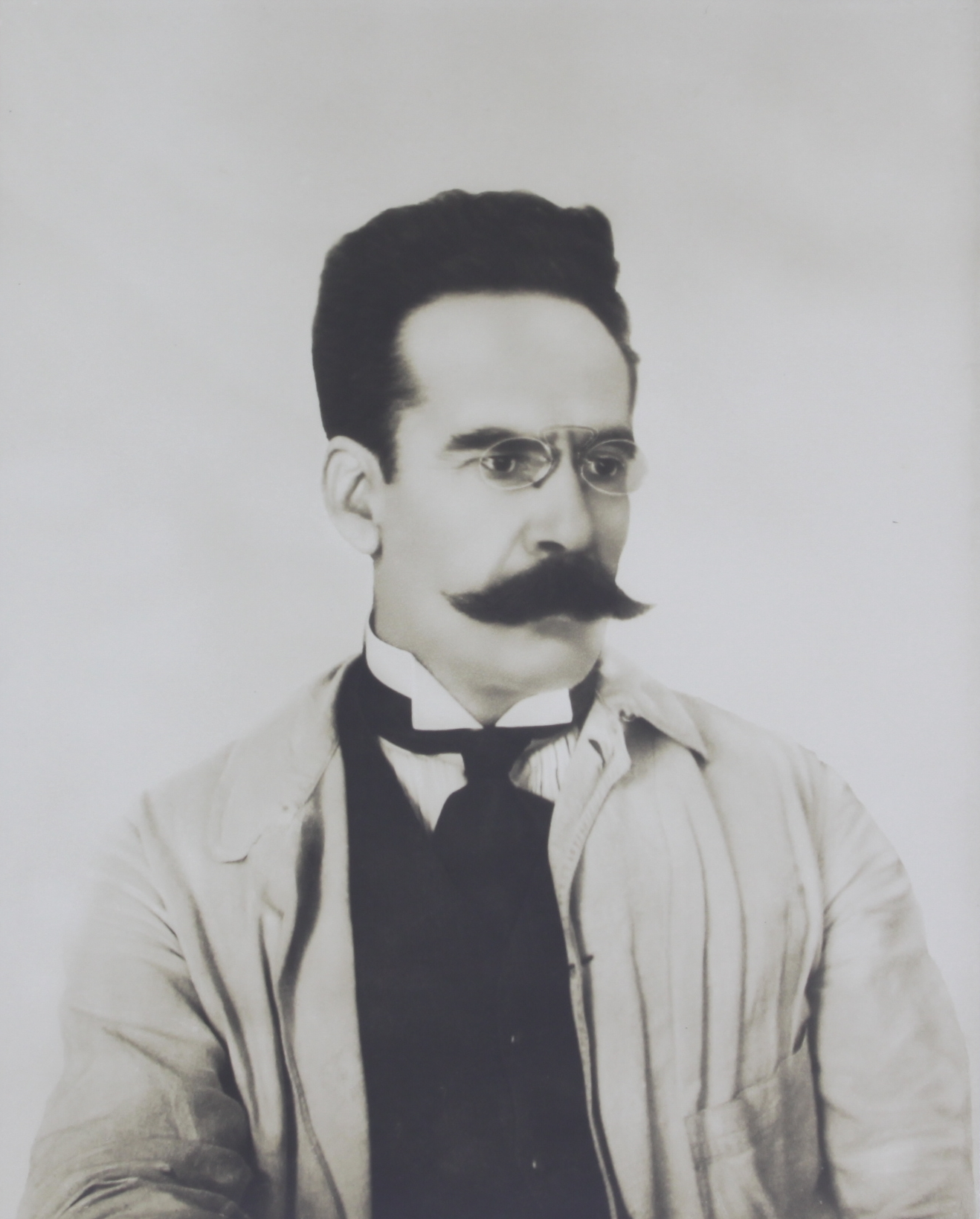
Manuel de Brito Camacho

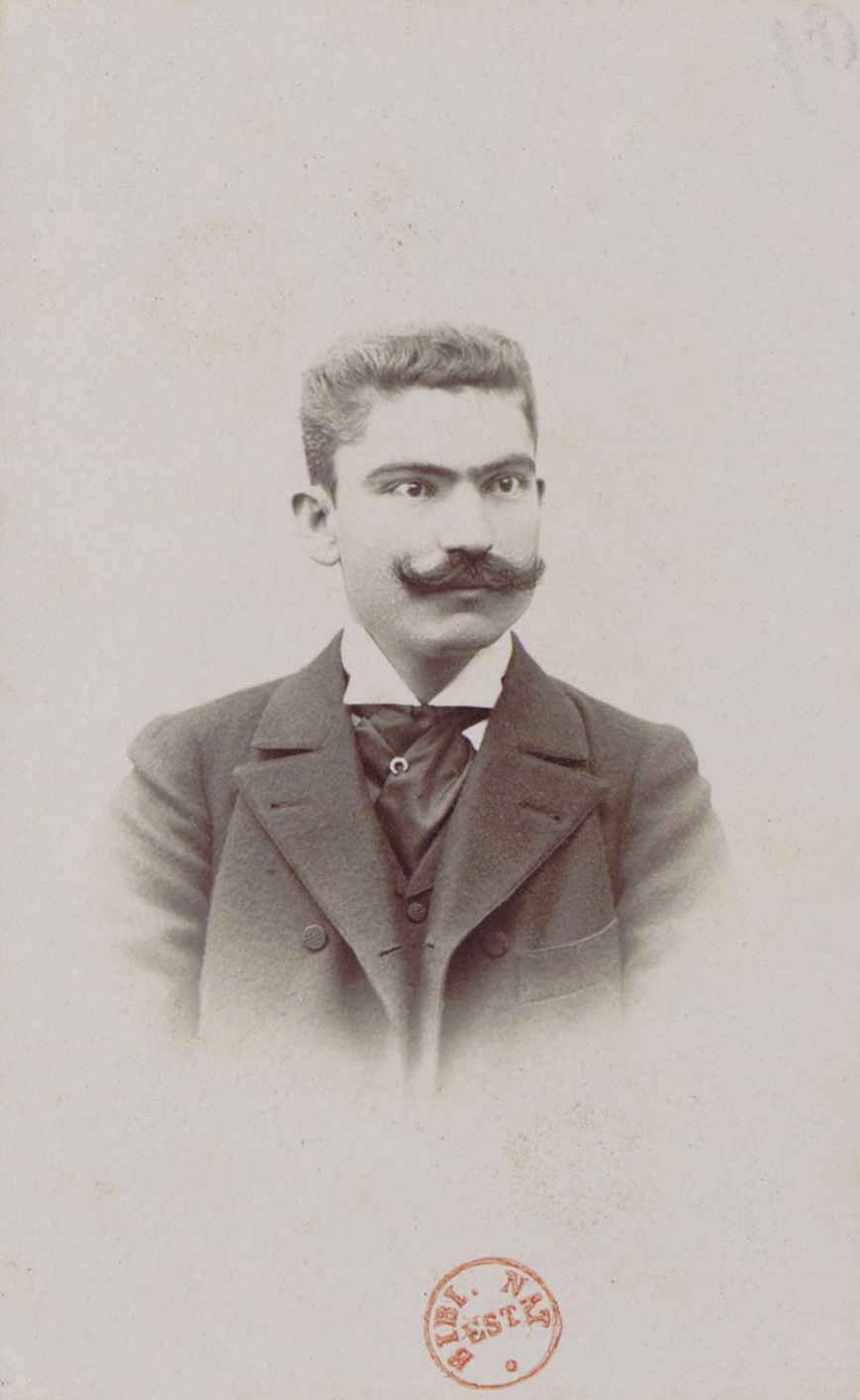
António Lobo de Almada Negreiros

Notable people from Aljustrel include:

- Manuel de Brito Camacho (1862—1934) a military officer, writer, publicist and politician; High Commissioner to Portuguese Mozambique, 1921-1923
- António Lobo de Almada Negreiros (1868–1939) a journalist and colonialist writer, essayist and poet; he lived in São Tomé Island
- Fernanda Peleja Patrício (1929 – 2000). Portuguese communist who opposed the Estado Novo regime, president of the Aljustrel council, 1986–1989.
- João Rebelo (born 1961) a former sport shooter who competed in each Summer Olympics from 1984 to 2000
- Jorge Soares (born 1971) a Portuguese retired footballer with 396 club caps

== Architecture ==
=== Civic ===
- Cinema/Theatre of Aljustrel (Portuguese: Cine-Teatro de Aljustrel/Cine Oriental)
- Fountain of Alonso Gomes (Portuguese: Chafariz de Alonso Gomes)
- Mines of Aljustrel (Portuguese: Minas de Aljustrel)
- Mines of São João do Deserto (Portuguese: Termas de São João do Deserto/Minas de São João do Deserto)
- Municipal Palace/Hall of Messejana (Portuguese: Câmara Municipal, Cadeia Comarcã e Torre do Relógio de Messejana)
- Museum of the Santa Casa da Misericórdia (Portuguese: Casa da Rua do Espírito Santo, 5/Museu da Santa Casa da Misericórdia de Messejana)
- Pillory of Messejana (Portuguese: Pelourinho de Messejana)
- Residence of the Majorat Moreiras (Portuguese: Casa dos Morgados Moreiras)

=== Military ===
- Castle of Aljustrel (Portuguese: Castelo de Aljustrel)
- Castle of Messejana (Portuguese: Castelo de Messejana)

=== Religious ===
- Chapel of the Santa Casa da Misericórdia (Portuguese: Capela da Santa Casa da Misericórdia de Aljustrel)
- Chapel of São Pedro (Portuguese: Capela de São Pedro)
- Church of Nossa Senhora da Assunção (Portuguese: Ermida de Nossa Senhora da Assunção/Igreja de Nossa Senhora da Assunção)
- Church of Nossa Senhora do Castelo (Portuguese: Igreja de Nossa Senhora do Castelo)
- Church of Nossa Senhora do Rosário (Portuguese: Igreja Paroquial de Messejana/Igreja de Nossa Senhora dos Remédios)
- Church of the Santa Casa da Misericórdia of Messejana (Portuguese: Igreja da Santa Casa da Misericórdia de Messejana)
- Church of the Santissimo Salvador (Portuguese: Igreja Paroquial de Aljustrel/Igreja do Santíssimo Salvador)
- Church of São João (Portuguese: Igreja Paroquial de São João de Negrilhos/Igreja de Montes Velhos/Igreja de São João)
- Church of São Julião (Portuguese: Igreja Paroquial de Ervidel/Igreja de São Julião)
- Hermitage of Santa Margarida (Portuguese: Ermida de Santa Margarida)
- Stations of the Cross of Messejana (Portuguese: Passos da Via Sacra de Messejana)
