= Mira (disambiguation) =

Mira is a star in the constellation Cetus

Mira may also refer to:

== Arts and entertainment ==
=== Film and television ===
- Mira (1971 film), a Dutch-Belgian film by Fons Rademakers
- Mira, Royal Detective, a Disney Junior animated television series
- Mira (2022 film), a Russian science-fiction disaster film directed by Dmitry Kiselyov

=== Gaming ===
- Mira, a planet that is the main setting of Xenoblade Chronicles X
- MIRA, a fictitious company in Among Us

=== Music ===
- Mira Records, a record label from 1965 to 1968
- Mira (band), an American darkwave band
- Mira (world music ensemble), an English world music ensemble
- Mira Calix, stage name of South African electronic musician Chantal Passamonte (born 1970)
- Mira (album), a 2014 album by Arild Andersen
- PRS Mira, a model of guitar from PRS Guitars

== Businesses ==
- MIRA Ltd., a UK automotive engineering and development consultancy company
- MiRA (real estate company), in Mexico
- Mira (shopping center), a shopping center in Munich
- The Mira Hong Kong, a hotel
- Mira Books, a book publishing imprint of Harlequin Enterprises
- Macquarie Infrastructure and Real Assets, New York-based subsidiary of privately held Macquarie Holdings (USA) Inc.

== Organizations ==
- Mira Foundation, a foundation dedicated to assisting people with disabilities
- Monterey Institute for Research in Astronomy, a California observatory
- Movement for Islamic Reform in Arabia, a Saudi London-based dissident group
- Independent Movement of Absolute Renovation (Movimiento Independiente de Renovación Absoluta), a Colombian political party

== People and fictional characters ==
- Mira (given name), including a list of people and fictional characters with the name
- Mira (surname), including a list of people with the name
- pen name of Mary Leapor (1722–1746), English poet
- Mira (singer), stage name of Romanian singer Maria Mirabela Cismaru

== Places ==
- Kingdom of Mira, part of the kingdom of Arzawa in western Anatolia
- Mira River (Nova Scotia), Canada
- Mira Canton, Ecuador
- Mira River (Ecuador and Colombia)
- Mira, Nadia, a census town in West Bengal, India
- Mira, Veneto, a town near Venice, Italy
- Mira, Portugal, a municipality
- Mira River (Portugal)
- Mira, Spain, a municipality
- Mira, Illinois, United States, an unincorporated community
- Mira, Louisiana, United States, an unincorporated community

== Science and technology ==
- Mira (supercomputer), constructed by IBM and now retired
- MIRA procedure, a medical treatment involving tissue grafting and adult stem cells
- Margin-infused relaxed algorithm, a machine-learning algorithm
- Middleware for Robotic Applications, a framework for robotic applications
- Monterey Institute for Research in Astronomy, an observatory located in Monterey County, California, United States
- Mira (wasp), a wasp genus in the family Encyrtidae
- Mira, the codename for Smart Display, a 2002 Microsoft product for a portable touchscreen terminal

== Ships ==
- Mira (AK-84), a ship that was never commissioned and instead became the U.S. Army Engineer Port Repair Ship Robert M. Emery
- USS Mira (SP-118), a motor launch scheduled for World War I use, but never commissioned
- SS Mira, various ships

== Other uses ==
- Daihatsu Mira, a compact car model
- Mira Airport, an airport in Serbia
- 3633 Mira, an asteroid
- MIRA (building), a building under construction in San Francisco
- Members of the Royal Irish Academy

== See also ==
- Meera (disambiguation)
- Mira-Bhayandar, a municipality in Maharashtra, India
- Mira variable, a type of star named after the supergiant star Mira
- Miraa or khat, a plant
- Myra (disambiguation)
