= Mira River =

Mira River may refer to:

- Mira River (Nova Scotia), a river on Cape Breton Island
- Mira River (Ecuador and Colombia)
- Mira River (Portugal), a river in southwestern Alentejo

== See also ==
- Mira (disambiguation)
