= Motis =

Motis may refer to one of the following:

- Andrea Motis (born 1995), Spanish musician
- Message Oriented Text Interchange Systems, an ISO messaging standard

== See also ==
- Motiș (disambiguation)
