= List of shipwrecks in February 1828 =

The list of shipwrecks in February 1828 includes some ships sunk, foundered, grounded, or otherwise lost during February 1828.

== 1 February ==
List of shipwrecks: 1 February 1828
Ship	State	Description
Sirene	Hamburg	The ship was sighted in the Straits of Sunda whilst on a voyage from Batavia, Netherlands East Indies to Stockholm, Sweden. No further trace, presumed foundered with the loss of all hands.

== 4 February ==
List of shipwrecks: 4 February 1828
Ship	State	Description
Fly	(United Kingdom of Great Britain and Ireland) New South Wales	The sloop capsized and sank in Cockle Bay.

== 8 February ==
List of shipwrecks: 8 February 1828
Ship	State	Description
Enterprise	United Kingdom	The ship departed from Dartmouth, Devon for Faro, Portugal. No further trace, presumed foundered with the loss of all hands.

== 9 February ==
List of shipwrecks: 9 February 1828
Ship	State	Description
Hornet	United Kingdom	The ship was wrecked in the Firth of Tay.
London	United Kingdom	The ship foundered in the Atlantic Ocean off Boscastle, Cornwall. She was on a voyage from Newport, Monmouthshire to London.

== 11 February ==
List of shipwrecks: 11 February 1828
Ship	State	Description
Æra	United Kingdom	The ship was driven ashore and wrecked 3 nautical miles (5.6 km) east of Bude, Cornwall. Her crew were rescued. She was on a voyage from London tro Drogheda, County Louth.
Clyde	United Kingdom	The ship was driven ashore in Tramore Bay. She was on a voyage from Cork to Glasgow, Renfrewshire.
Hibernia	United Kingdom	The ship was driven ashore at Milford Haven, Pembrokeshire. She was on a voyage from Bristol, Gloucestershire to Waterford.
Mary	United Kingdom	The ship was driven ashore near Cardigan. She was on a voyage from Wicklow to Swansea, Glamorgan.
Mary	United Kingdom	The ship was driven ashore and wrecked at Milford Haven. She was on a voyage from Cardiff, Glamorgan to Guernsey, Channel Islands.

== 12 February ==
List of shipwrecks: 12 February 1828
Ship	State	Description
Güte Brotter	Bremen	The ship was wrecked on Heligoland. Her crew were rescued. She was on a voyage from Ventava, Courland Governorate to Bremen.
Olive	United Kingdom	The ship was wrecked near Dublin. She was on a voyage from Liverpool, Lancashire to Cork.

== 13 February ==
List of shipwrecks: 13 February 1828
Ship	State	Description
Gratitude	United Kingdom	The ship departed from Limerick for Plymouth, Devon. No further trace, presumed foundered with the loss of all hands.
Helen	United Kingdom	The ship was driven ashore and wrecked at Dungarvan, County Waterford.
Lord Hill	United Kingdom	The ship was driven ashore near Flamborough Head, Yorkshire.
Magnet	United Kingdom	The ship foundered in the English Channel off Burton Bradstock, Dorset with the loss of all hands.
Mermaid	United Kingdom	The sloop was driven ashore and wrecked in Whiting Bay, County Waterford, Ireland. Her five crew were rescued. She was on a voyage from Newport, Monmouthshire to Cork.
Susannah	United Kingdom	The ship was lost in St Brides Bay with the loss of all but one of her crew.
Triton	United Kingdom	The ship foundered in the Atlantic Ocean. All on board took to the boats and were rescued on 17 February by Milton (United Kingdom). She was on a voyage from Liverpool to New York, United States.

== 14 February ==
List of shipwrecks: 14 February 1828
Ship	State	Description
George	United Kingdom	The brigantine ran aground at Swansea, Glamorgan and was wrecked. Her crew were rescued. She was on a voyage from Bristol, Gloucestershire to Bideford, Devon.
Sophia	United Kingdom	The schooner was lost near Kingstown, County Dublin. Her crew were rescued.
Speculation	United Kingdom	The ship foundered in the Bristol Channel off Lundy Island, Devon. Her crew were rescued. She was on a voyage from Llanelli, Glamorgan to Hayle, Cornwall.

== 16 February ==
List of shipwrecks: 16 February 1828
Ship	State	Description
Lord Nelson	United Kingdom	The ship ran aground on the Corton Sand, in the North Sea off the coast of Suffolk and sank.
Whitburn	United Kingdom	The ship ran aground on the Corton Sand and sank.

== 17 February ==
List of shipwrecks: 17 February 1828
Ship	State	Description
Nancy	United Kingdom	The ship was wrecked at São Miguel, Azores, Portugal. Her crew were rescued.

== 18 February ==
List of shipwrecks: 18 February 1828
Ship	State	Description
Treaty	United States	The brig was driven ashore at Gibraltar. She was on a voyage from Philadelphia, Pennsylvania to Cádiz, Spain.
Two Friends	(United Kingdom of Great Britain and Ireland) Gibraltar	The schooner was driven ashore at Gibraltar.
Union	United Kingdom	The ship was driven ashore and wrecked at Edgartown, Massachusetts, United States. She was on a voyage from Nassau, Bahamas to St. Andrew, New Brunswick, British North America.
Venerable	United Kingdom	The brig was driven ashore and wrecked at Doolin, County Clare with the loss of all but her captain. She was on a voyage from Cork to Galway.

== 19 February ==
List of shipwrecks: 19 February 1828
Ship	State	Description
Dispatch	United Kingdom	The ship was wrecked at Sunderland, County Durham. Her crew were rescued.
Fancy	United Kingdom	The ship was wrecked near Vila Nova de Milfontes, Portugal. Her crew were rescued. She was on a voyage from London to Cádiz, Spain.
Gibraltar	United Kingdom	The ship was wrecked near St. Ubes, Spain.
Jane	(United Kingdom of Great Britain and Ireland) British North America	The ship was driven ashore and wrecked at Vila Nova de Milfontes, Portugal with the loss of five lives. She was on a voyage from Liverpool, Lancashire, United Kingdom to Gibraltar.
Midas	United Kingdom	The transport ship was wrecked at Vila Nova de Milfontes with the loss of 95 lives.

== 20 February ==
List of shipwrecks: 20 February 1828
Ship	State	Description
Ann Maria	United States	The ship was wrecked on Deer Island. She was on a voyage from New York to Saint John, New Brunswick, British North America.
Henry and Ann	United Kingdom	The ship foundered in the North Sea off Heligoland with the loss of all hands. She was on a voyage from Hamburg to Newcastle upon Tyne, Northumberland.

== 22 February ==
List of shipwrecks: 22 February 1828
Ship	State	Description
Valiant	United Kingdom	The transport ship was driven ashore and wrecked 12 nautical miles (22 km) south of Figuera da Foz, Portugal. Her crew were rescued.

== 23 February ==
List of shipwrecks: 23 February 1828
Ship	State	Description
Ellen	United Kingdom	The ship was driven ashore at Figueira da Foz, Portugal.
St. Nicholay	Russia	The brig was wrecked north of Wick, Caithness, United Kingdom. Her twelve crew were rescued She was on a voyage from Saint Petersburg, Russia to Liverpool, Lancashire, United Kingdom.

== 25 February ==
List of shipwrecks: 25 February 1828
Ship	State	Description
Lady Digby	United Kingdom	The ship was abandoned off Dunfunghy, County Donegal. She was on a voyage from Liverpool, Lancashire to New Orleans, Louisiana, United States.

== Unknown date ==
List of shipwrecks: Unknown date in February 1828
Ship	State	Description
Brisk	United Kingdom	The ship was driven ashore and wrecked at Kirk Michael, Isle of Man. She was on a voyage from Limerick to Liverpool, Lancashire.
Federal Argentina	Argentina	The privateer ran aground near Buenos Aires whilst trying to evade a Brazilian Navy squadron. She was set afire and destroyed.
General Mansilla	Argentina	The privateer ran aground between Buenos Aires and Burragan whilst trying to evade a Brazilian Navy squadron. She was set afire and destroyed.
Jubilee	United Kingdom	The ship was driven ashore at Aberavon, Glamorgan. She was on a voyage from Padstow, Cornwall to Liverpool.
L'Aldada	Portugal	The ship was run down and sunk in the Tagus. She was on a voyage from Cork, United Kingdom to Lisbon.
Spring	United Kingdom	The smack foundered in the Irish Sea in late February with the loss of all hands. She was on a voyage from Neath, Glamorgan to Edinburgh, Lothian.
Victory	United Kingdom	The ship was lost near "Pinichi".
