= DZM =

DZM may refer to:

- DZM, a shortening of Deutsches Zeitungsmuseum
- DZM, a 180 dot printer in the MERA 300 family of devices
- DZM, CIPM MRA signatory code for the Croatian State Office for Metrology
- DZM "Vostorg-2", a Russian variant of the BMP-3
- DZM, German acronym for Deutsches Zentrum Mobilität der Zukunft, organization advised by Grazia Vittadini
