= Fort São Clemente =

Bastion fort in Portugal

- Forte de São Clemente
- Vila Nova de Milfontes, Portugal
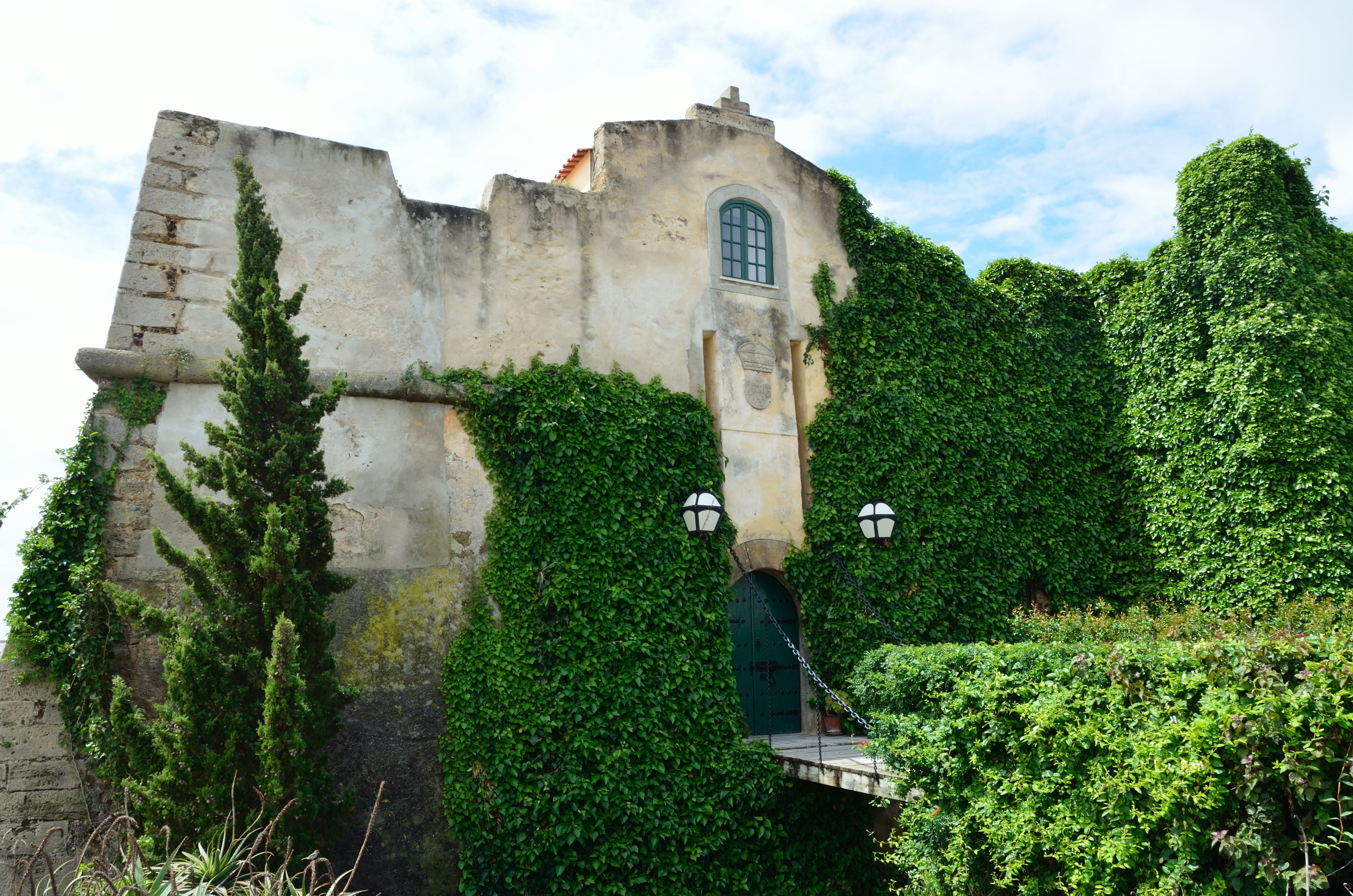
- Landside view of Fort São Clemente

Site information
- Type: Bastion fort
- Condition: Good

Location
- Coordinates: 37°43′22″N 8°46′59″W

Fort São Clemente or Fort St. Clement (Portuguese: Forte de São Clemente), also known as the Castle or Fort of Vila Nova de Milfontes (Castelo or Forte de Vila Nova de Milfontes), is located in the town and parish of Vila Nova de Milfontes, in the municipality of Odemira, in the Alentejo Region of Portugal. It was built in 1602 to defend the town from pirate attacks and the mouth of the Mira River. It lost military functions in the 19th century, having been sold to private individuals in 1903. It is considered an ex-Libris of Vila Nova de Milfontes, and was classified as a Property of Public Interest in 1978.

== Description ==
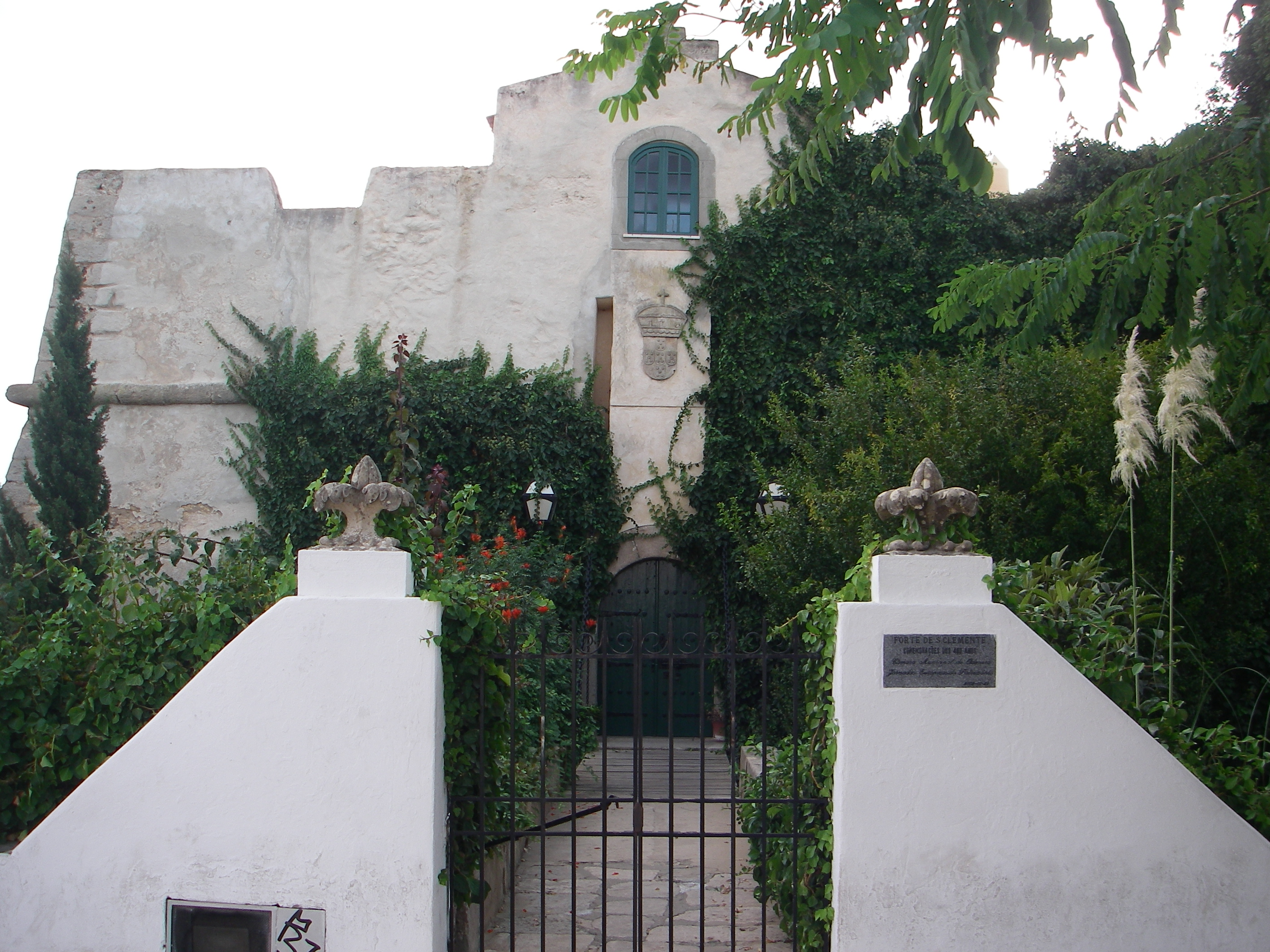
Façade and gateway to the fort

It consists of a coastal fortification, of the bastioned type, located on a rocky outcrop on the right bank of the mouth of the River Mira, in Vila Nova de Milfontes. It is located in a dominant over the village, which spreads out to the north and east. Next to the monument is Praça da Barbacã ("Barbican Square"), where a monument was erected to the first air crossing between Portugal and Macau, which departed from Vila Nova de Milfontes in 1924.

It originally had a polygon plan, roughly square, and was divided into two platforms at different levels, to which two protruding bastions were added, in the corners facing northwest and southwest. On the two platforms were other batteries. The bulwark facing the mouth of the river was originally round, having been modified to a sharp edge towards the end of the 17th century. On the sides of the fortress facing the village, there was an embankment provided with embrasures, measuring 35 m on each side. The wall was sloped. On the east wall is the gate-of-arms, with a round arch, and topped by the coat of arms in stone, which depicts bears a closed crown. This side of the wall has a ledge in the wall, forming a flanking angle, although without a bulwark. The north and east faces of the wall were protected by a flooded ditch, with a counter-scarpment on the outer side, which was traversed by a covered road, whose access to the ditch was via a stone staircase, which has since disappeared. This ditch was protected by two terraces, equipped with raised triangular ravelins. The main vestige of these exterior defense structures is the wall around the ditch, forming the barbican viewpoint.

From the inside, the gate gives access to a corridor, where the Guard Corps was located, and a portcullis. The interior of the fortress is divided into two floors, the lower one being originally occupied by the troops' barracks and warehouses, with several compartments in the lower square, such as the chapel, which was located next to the embankment. The wall of the lower square is torn by a set of arched windows. At the top was the Command House, which was originally covered by a terrace, used by musketeers, and which was later transformed into a roof. In the upper square there is also a water tower desguised as a medieval tower. The fort probably had a ramp for carts carved into the rock, whose remains were found during archaeological studies in the 2010s.

The property is mainly in the Mannerist style, although it has some elements that create a typical Romantic ambience, such as the false turret and the ivy covering on the North and East facades. The constructive apparatus is typical of the Habsburg era. The writer Pinho Leal mentions in his 1886 work Portugal Antiga e Moderno that the castle had "a drawbridge, moats, barbacan, magazine, chapel, accommodation for the garrison, etc".

In 2012, during works on Avenida Marginal, near Franquia beach and about 50 m from the fort, a curved masonry wall was discovered, with a structure in schist and local diorite, with lime mortar, which may have been built during Roman times or else connected to the fortress. This last hypothesis is the most likely, and may have been part of the old well of the fort, a structure that appears in old charts. Several ceramic fragments were discovered at the site, commonly found at a well, in addition to that area being used by the population of Vila Nova de Milfontes after the well ceased to function, between the 19th and 20th centuries. In the area, fragments of carvings of lithic materials in quartzite and greywacke, and remains of amphorae, possibly Roman, were also discovered, which however could have been brought together with the sand that was deposited there, during the works for the construction of a sports field.

== History ==
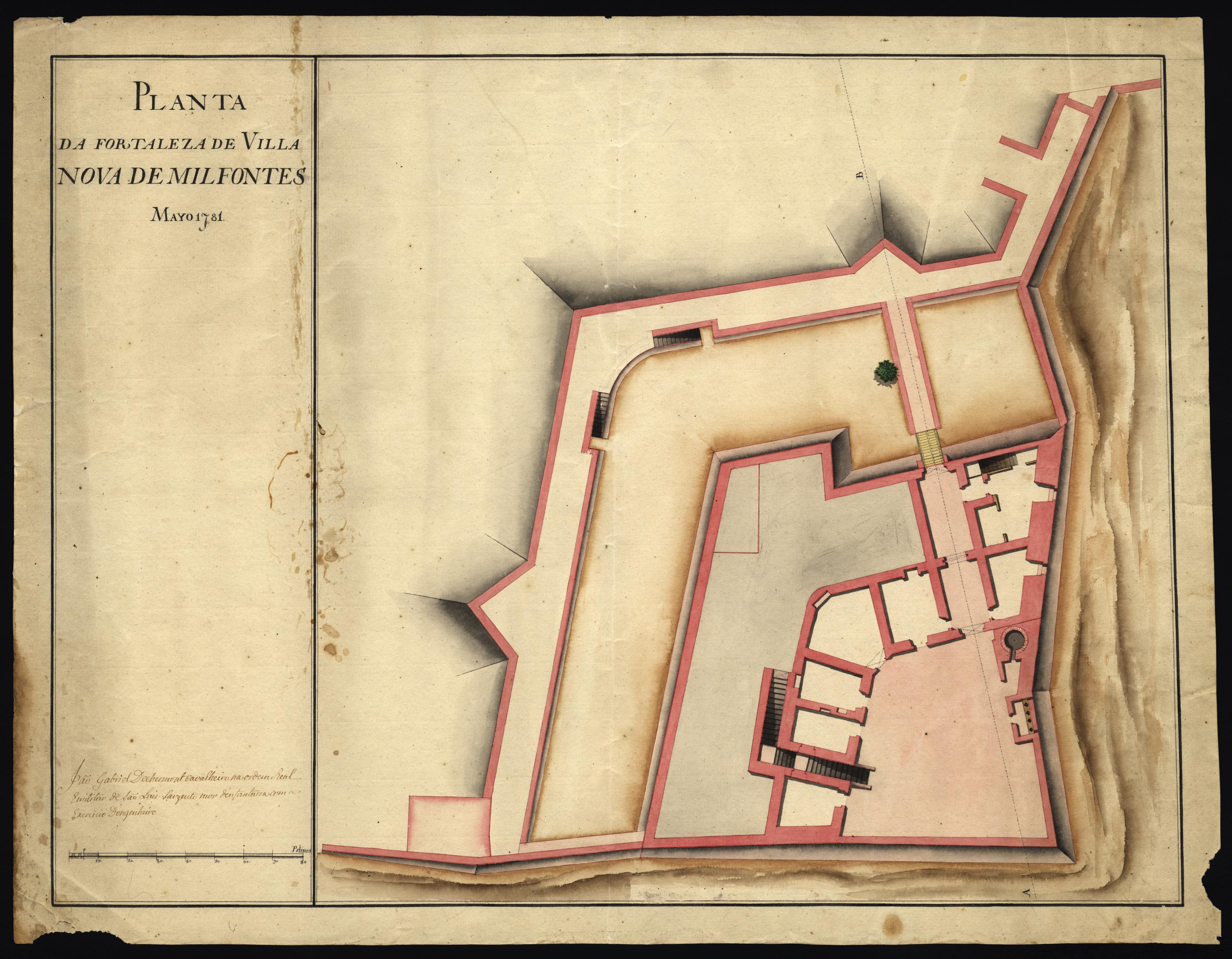
1781 plan of Fort São Clemente

=== Background ===
The mouth of the Mira River has been of great importance for maritime and river navigation since ancient times, due to its location and good mooring conditions, in addition to being the only port located along the coastal strip between Sines and Cape Saint Vincent. It was used at least from the Roman period, as can be seen from the discovery of anchors and pottery fragments, having continued this function throughout the Middle Ages, constituting a secondary port for the port structures that served the town of Odemira. Its importance grew from the 12th century onwards, when the Mira River began to suffer from increasingly severe silting. Despite the presence of the natural port, the area itself was practically uninhabited until the settlement was founded, by royal decree of King John II. However, one of the main threats to the population was the attacks of Muslim pirates coming from North Africa. One of the biggest attacks took place during the beginning of the reign of John II, when the village was sacked and burned, to the point of being almost completely deserted, since the inhabitants abandoned it, taking refuge in the interior. In order to protect the population, the monarch offered fifty outlaws the right of asylum, under the condition that they help defend the inhabitants from pirates and corsairs. In 1512, it received a charter from King Manuel.

=== Construction and early history ===
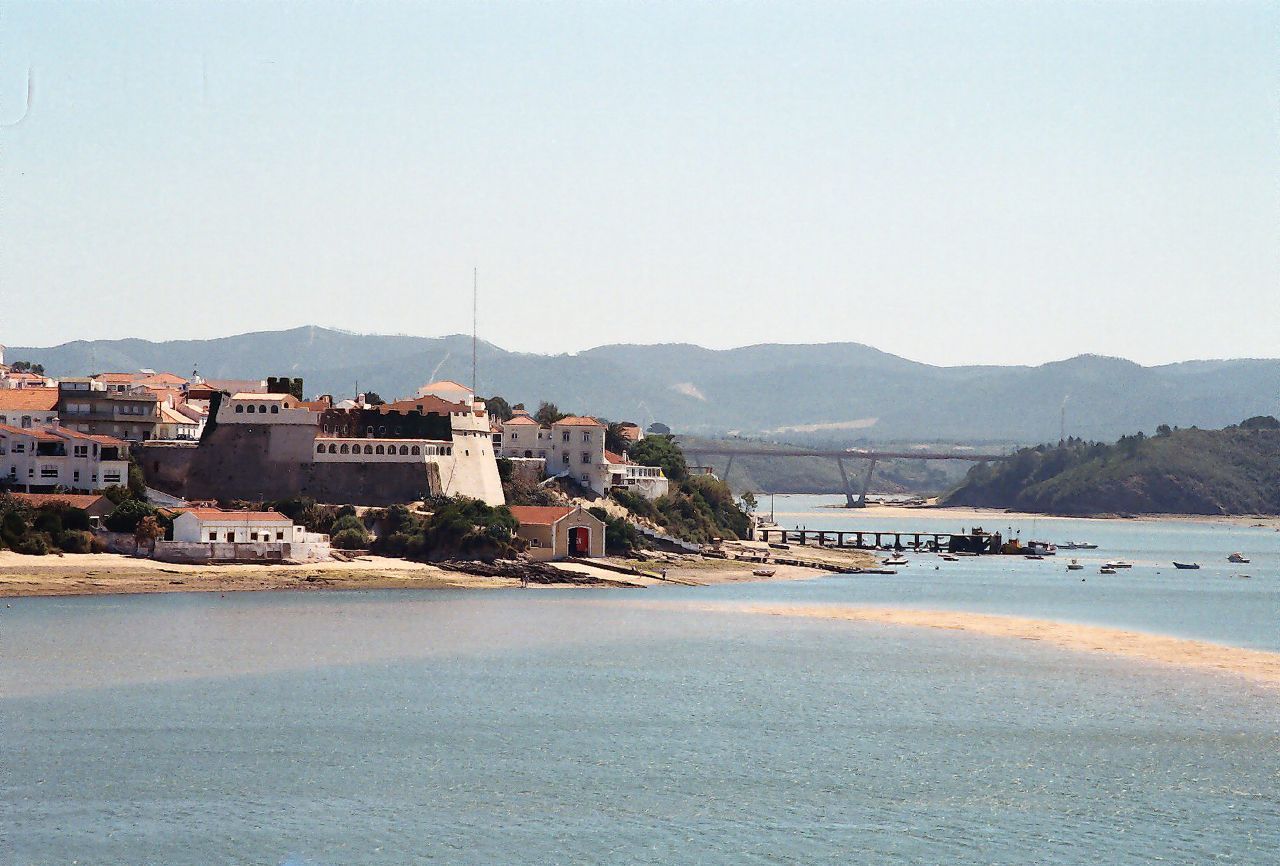
Sea side view of the Mira river mouth and the fort

Although the installation of outlaws in Vila Nova de Milfontes reduced the attacks, it did not eliminate the threat of the pirates. In 1590, the corsairs staged a major assault, during which the town was almost completely destroyed. Thus, in 1598, the Neapolitan engineer Alexandre Massai was appointed by the Council of War to reconnoitre the area around the mouth of the Mira River, and find out how to organize its defense against pirates. The fort was built between 1599 and 1602, during the Habsburg period, and was also planned by Alexandre Massai. In addition to protecting the village from pirates, the fort would also defend the important mouth of the Mira River, also functioning as a customs area. According to historian Carlos Pereira Calixto, another reason for building the fort was the loss of Portuguese independence from Spain in 1580, with the Spanish monarch building several ports along the Portuguese coast, in order to prevent a British landing.

The construction of the fort led to the suspension of work on a fortification in the center of Pessegueiro island, which would complement the existing defenses on the island, but which was never built, as it was considered a lower priority. Both were part of a network of fortifications that were supposed to protect the coastal strip south of the River Sado, but this program was compromised due to the cancellation of the fort on Pessegueiro, which led to problems with the safety of the coastline and vessels.

The installation of the fort led to major physical changes on the river bank, not only through its implantation but also due to the extraction of stone for its construction, probably from submerged rocks, with the discovery of the remains of a quarry in the vicinity of the fort. Still in the 17th century, the well that served the fort was built, and was probably also used to water the vessels. Both the fort and the well fit into the context of construction of port infrastructure at the mouth of the River Mira, during medieval and modern times.

In 1621, the building was already in need of repair work, being at that time equipped with five pieces of artillery, harquebuses and muskets, but it was not garrisoned nor did it have munitions. It was managed by a wealthy citizen of Vila Nova de Milfontes, Diogo Fernandes. According to Calixto Pereira, after Portugal regained its independence in 1640, the need to reinforce coastal defenses arose again in order to avoid a possible landing of enemy forces, this time from Spain, while also to repel pirate attacks, not only Muslims but also Protestants. Thus, John IV ordered that the fort be rebuilt, and the works were concluded in 1693. Within the scope of this program, some structural changes were introduced, such as the modification of the bulwark facing the river bar. According to Calixto Pereira, after the end of the works, the fortress had six pieces of fire and a garrison of two companies of soldiers, and the inhabitants of the village and its hinterland were obligated to present themselves to the governor when the bell of the fort gave the signal of alarm. It must also have been during this period that a watchtower, known as Vigia do Canal, was built by the sea, which served to warn the fort of the approach of an enemy fleet. The garrison of this watchtower had to light a number of fires corresponding to the number of enemy vessels, thus alerting the fort, which in turn had to ring the bell so that the population could organize themselves.

=== 18th and 19th centuries ===
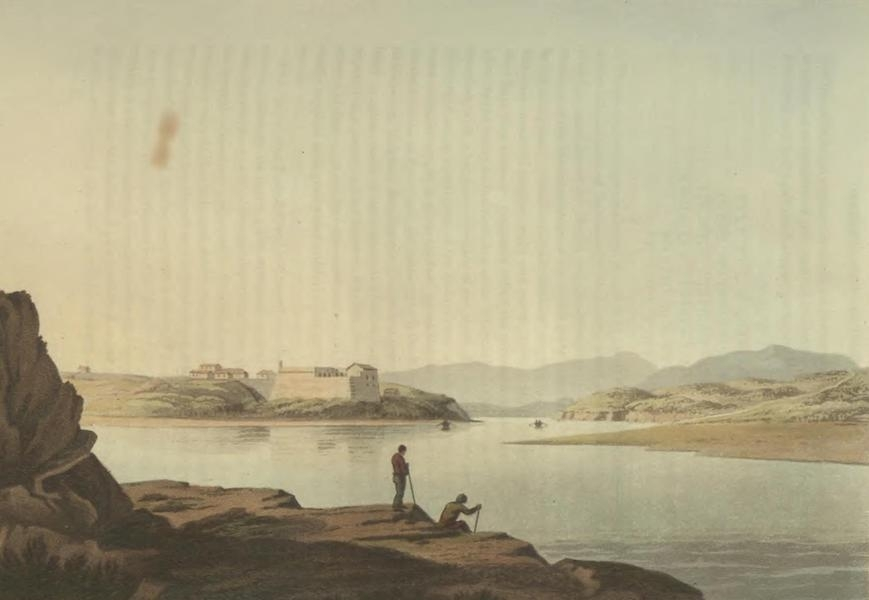
1818 painting of Vila Nova de Milfontes by George Landmann

In the work Portugal: Diccionario Historico, published in 1915 by Esteves Pereira and Guilherme Rodrigues, it is mentioned that in 1708 the castle had twelve pieces of artillery. In the middle of this century, the fortress was part of the Setúbal Division, being considered part of Lisbon's maritime defenses. At that time, most of the fortifications in that division were in poor condition, including that of Vila Nova de Milfontes, which needed repairs. At the same time, the mouth of the Mira River was losing importance due to its progressive silting, which prevented vessels from entering. The castle lost its strategic functions in the mid-19th century. João Maria Baptista states in his 1874 work Chorographia Moderna do Reino de Portugal, that the castle was already "dismantled", and Pinho Leal reports in 1886 that it was in ruins.

=== 20th and 21st centuries ===
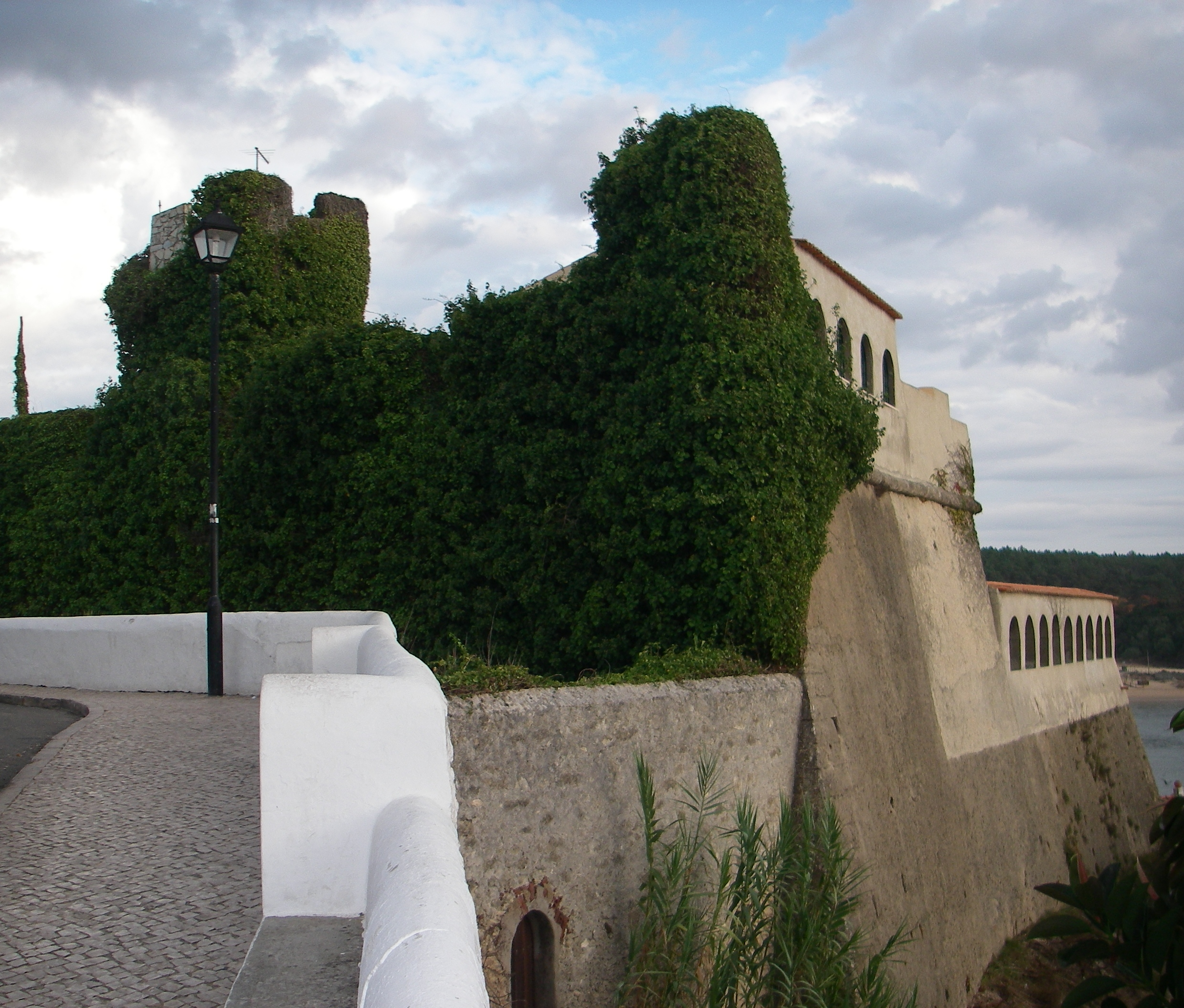
Side view of the fort

The fort was sold at public auction in 1903 or 1906, beginning a period of about four decades during which it passed through several owners, having considerably accentuated its degradation. In 1931, the Council of Vila Nova de Milfontes decided that the property should be expropriated and demolished, but this decision did not go ahead due to lack of financial resources. In 1937, a new request was made for its demolition, which was rejected by the Directorate-General for National Buildings and Monuments. In 1939 it was acquired by Luís Manuel de Castro e Almeida, who ordered major restoration works to be carried out, during which the structure was modified, with part of the fort being transformed into a private residence, while the remaining spaces were used as a tourist establishment. Master João Damásio was responsible for the works, as indicated on a tiled tombstone inside the building. In contemporary times, a water tower was installed in order to solve supply problems, hidden by a false turret. At this time, the interior of the fortress was also modified, including the excavation of the embankment and its connection to the moat by a door, and the expansion of the buildings in the elevated square, in order to expand the habitable area. During the works, part of the wall of a battery was also raised, which had fallen at the beginning of the century. In 1943, Carlos Pereira Calixto proposed the installation of an inn at the monument, since at that time there were no hotel establishments in the village in a position to receive tourists, who flocked to the beaches during the summer season.

It was classified as a Property of Public Interest by Decree No. 95/78, of September 12, under the name of Forte de Milfontes. In 1998, the monument underwent restoration work and its transformation into a guest house. In November 2009 it was already for sale, becoming just a private residence. In July 2013, it went on sale again.

Despite functioning as a private residence, the fort still participates in various cultural events; for example, in 2020 and 2021 guided tours were organized to the fort, under the Terras sem Sombra festival, with the 2021 visit being coordinated by historian António Martins Quaresma.
