= Mera =

Mera may refer to:

== Places ==
- Mera, Pastaza, a town in Ecuador
- Shell Mera, Pastaza, a town in Ecuador
- Mera people, a community in Tulunadu, India
- Mera, Dhanbad, a town in India
- Méra, a village in Borsod-Abaúj-Zemplén County, Hungary
- Mera, Baciu, a village in Baciu Commune, Cluj County, Romania
- Mera, Vrancea, a commune in Romania

=== Geographical features ===
- Mera (Lake Como), a river in Switzerland and Italy (also known as the Maira in Switzerland)
- Mera (Žeimena), a tributary of the Žeimena in Lithuania
- Mera Peak, a mountain in Nepal
- Mera, a tributary of the river Nadăș in Romania
- Mera, a tributary of the river Dâlgov in Romania

== Other ==
- Cipriano Mera (1897–1975), Spanish military and political figure during the Second Spanish Republic
- Mera (character), a comic book character, wife of Aquaman
- Mera (DC Extended Universe), a character in the DC Extended Universe, based on the DC comic book character
- MERA 300, a Polish minicomputer family
- MER-A (Mars Exploration Rover - A), the Spirit rover
- Mera, a type of Pontiac Fiero
- Radical Left Front (Metopo Rizospastikis Aristeras), a coalition of far-left political parties in Greece
- MeRA25 and MERA25 (Μétopo Evropaikís Realistikís Anypakoís), two left-wing, progressive, and pro-European political parties in Greece and Germany respectively, both allied to the Democracy in Europe Movement 2025 (DiEM25)
- Multi-scale entanglement renormalization ansatz, proposed by Spanish physicist Guifré Vidal

== See also ==
- Mer (disambiguation)
- Meera (disambiguation)
