= Têtes à claques =

French-Canadian comedy website

Tête à claques
- Website type: Humour website
- Available in: French; English; Spanish
- Owner: Michel Beaudet
- Creator: Michel Beaudet
- Website: tetesaclaques.tv
- Launched: 16 August 2006
- Current status: active

Le Willi Waller, one of the most popular shorts

Têtes à claques (French pronunciation: [tɛtza klak]) is a French-language humour website created on 16 August 2006. Over one million short videos are watched per day, making it one of the most popular francophone websites in Quebec (and eventually Canada as a whole). As of December 2017, 290 videos had been created. The most popular of these include Le pilote, Le Willi Waller, and Halloween.

The creator, Michel Beaudet, has expressed surprise at the popularity of his site, saying it has reached an audience he never anticipated.

In 2010, Mondo Media picked up the English version of Têtes à claques and began broadcasting it under the name TAC.

In January 2016, the second version of the English series, now titled Knuckleheads, got its premiere on Adult Swim. It was partly remastered to make jokes understandable for an English-speaking audience (for example, the Prime Minister was made similar to Stephen Harper).

The clips are produced by Salambo Productions, a company Beaudet formed in order to capitalize on the success of Têtes à claques.

== Description ==
The skits feature characters sculpted from modelling clay that are fairly simplistic. Michel Beaudet creates the figures himself, by superimposing his own moving eyes, mouth, and sometimes nose on their faces with a computer. In addition, Beaudet has a set of fake, grotesque teeth, which he puts in while his face is being filmed. The phrase tête à claques translates loosely as "a face so dumb, you want to slap it".

The site has also become very popular in France, not only because of the intentional humour and wit, but also because of a stereotypical Quebec accent. This differs greatly from pronunciations used in France, and thus provides its own humour, in addition to the frequent anglicisms (English words or expressions inserted into speech).

== History ==
Beaudet has said that "Têtes à claques was an accident". Previously a professional advertiser, he wanted to create an educational program for children by making animals using modelling clay. These animals would have described their lives, their natural habitats, and other information, interspersed with some childish gags. Beaudet says he quickly discovered that "90% of the time it takes to animate is spent moving the eyes and mouth." He tried doing it by hand, but because he was "too lazy", he decided to record his own face and superimpose his eyes and mouth on the figurines. He began by making frogs and had fun making them fart in water. After he showed the results to his friends and relatives, they were more amused by the farting frogs than by the original idea.

From late 2007 to 2010, Beaudet received offers from telephone companies and television stations. Incidentally, the first offer was from a French, not Canadian company. The popularity of the show surged to the point that Beaudet employed two other people, video editor Simon Parizeau and artistic director Hugo Caron, to help with the production at his home in Boucherville.

In February 2007, Têtes à claques announced a partnership with Bell Canada to provide videos and other media on Bell Mobility, Sympatico, and Bell Satellite TV services. The same year, they also signed a deal with the American company Topps and produced several clips for their candy brand Vertigo. A series of figurines, sweaters, and accessories with Têtes à claques images went on sale on Beaudet's official site. A clip titled Le chien (The dog) was created in partnership with the Quebec-based Mira Guide Dog Foundation.

In June 2007, the animators listed a Body Toner Platinum Edition, a Willi Waller 2006, and an LCD shovel 2007 on eBay. These items, popularized by some of the best-known clips on the site, were intended to raise funds for the Centre hospitalier universitaire Sainte-Justine, a prominent pediatric centre in Quebec.

In October 2007, Têtes à claques started pre-sales of its Region 1 DVDs. Volume 1 includes the first 45 clips, the history of Têtes à claques, character bios, and English, Quebec French, and international French subtitles. Volume 2 was released on 21 October 2008. In addition to the subsequent 45 clips from the series, the DVD contains supplementary material such as a documentary on the history of the series titled Têtes à claques: une histoire "unbelievable" (Têtes à claques: an "unbelievable" story), a clip created for the 40th birthday of singer Celine Dion, deleted scenes, and others. Volume 3 was released on 1 December 2009 with the next 45 clips, and Volume 4 came out on 1 March 2011.

In 2017, new videos were released on the site titled Ne Paniquez Pas, Restez Calme, and later in English as Don't Panic. Stay Calm, in which they parody educational videos instructing people on how to act in life-threatening situations. The same year, a set of older Têtes à claques videos dubbed in Spanish appeared on the site under the name Los Caraculo (The buttfaces).

In September 2019, Beaudet released a teaser trailer for a new series he had created, titled Les Histoires bizarres du professeur Zarbi (The Bizarre Stories of Professor Zarbi), featuring the eponymous Professor Zarbi, specialist in occult and paranormal phenomena, who together with his young neighbour and assistant Benjamin takes part in incredible adventures. Each episode runs for 30 minutes. Beaudet maintains that his team has refined their animation methods compared to Têtes à claques by using software from Toon Boom Animation. According to Beaudet, "This allows us to create much more spectacular and fluid animations".

== English versions ==
In August 2008, the beta version of the new bilingual "Têtes à claques" website was launched. Beaudet stated that making English versions of the comedy shorts is in his "game plan".

The first English version of most dialogues is interpreted by Canadian voiceover actor Bruce Dinsmore, best known for the PBS series Arthur. Dinsmore was chosen by Beaudet because he was similar to him in many ways, from his looks to his eyes, so the main difference between the versions would be language. Beaudet still performs the voices of some of the characters (Captain Cooper, Raoul, and a fast food drive-through worker). The shorts were reanimated and translated to English for better humour and quality for English-speaking audiences; for example, the Super Bol has been reanimated and renamed to Beat the Buzzer. Mondo Media picked up the show under the name TAC.TV. Also, Le Willi Waller sketches have the products renamed because the episodes were produced later than when the product was made (for example, Willi Waller 2006 becomes the Willi Waller Gold Edition and the LCD Shovel 2007 becomes the LCD Shovel Full HD because it was produced in 2008, later than 2006). Some fans have complained that the jokes are meaningless since one of the main purposes of the series is to poke fun of the Quebecois accent, which the English version does not replicate. Others have appreciated the humour in the translated jokes.

The second English version, entitled Knuckleheads, feature remastered versions of full 22-minute Têtes à claques episodes (most of them now animated with CG and After Effects). Canadian actor Joe Cobden interpreted all of the dialogue and has played nearly all of the characters in each cartoon. This English version was developed by Toronto-based playwright Bobby Theodore. Just like TAC.tv, Knuckleheads made several edits and changes in order to make jokes understandable for English-speaking audiences. They also made numerous name changes, such as the famous character Uncle Tom, whose name was changed to Uncle Ted (possibly to avoid any racial issues). The series finally premiered on Adult Swim Canada in January 2016, making it the first time Têtes à claques aired on English-speaking television.

== Criticism and controversy ==
On 12 November 2006, Beaudet appeared on the Quebec television show Tout le monde en parle (Everyone's Talking About It) hosted by Guy A. Lepage. He noted many employers have blocked access to the site because it has become so popular that workers were watching it during the day. Numerous schools across Canada have blocked it as well, mostly for its use of mature language and profanity.

In 2006, the clip So sexy was banned from the site due to copyright infringement for using the song "I'm Too Sexy" by Right Said Fred. The clip could still be viewed elsewhere on the internet.

In April 2007, the organization Québec Pluriel deemed the clip Le Cannibale racist. Monique, a character from the clip, nicknames one of the cannibals Kunta Kinte, an ironic nod to the African slave whose life was the subject of the Alex Haley book and TV miniseries Roots. Following this, Michel Beaudet stated that he had no racist intentions and justified the choice of name as purely humorous.

== Partial list of original characters in French ==
- Raoul Robidoux
- Lucien and Monique
- Morin and Monette
- Uncle Tom
- Natacha
- Captain Pichette
- The co-pilot
- Gabriel and Samuel
- Les ti-papoutes
- Jimmy and Réjean
- Yvon
- Gaétan
- Turcotte
- Marcel and Roger
- Jack Curtis
- Carole and Ginette
