= SS Mira =

SS Mira may refer to:

- SS Mira (Finnish ship), a ship that convoyed with the icebreaker Sampo during the Finnish Civil War
- SS Mira (German ship), a ship owned by Holm & Molzen from 1923 to 1929
- SS Mira (Italian ship), a cargo ship sunk in May 1943 by American aircraft
- SS Mira (Portuguese ship), a cargo ship which collided with another vessel and sank in November 1916
- SS Mira (Swedish ship), a cargo ship which collided with the wreck of the ocean liner Gneisenau and sank in 1949
- SS Mira (UK ship), a ship that rescued some of the crew from the wreck of the cargo ship Anna in 1914

== See also ==
- Mira (disambiguation)
