= Meera (disambiguation) =

Meera (or Mirabai) was a Hindu mystic poet and devotee of Krishna.

Meera may also refer to:

== People ==
- Meera (Malayalam actress), Indian actress
- Meera (Pakistani actress) (born 1977), Pakistani film actress
- Meera Jasmine (born 1982), south Indian actor
- Meera Krishnan, Tamil actor
- Meera Syal (born 1961), British-Indian actress
- Mother Meera (born 1960), Indian religious leader

== Fictional characters ==
- Meera Reed, character from George R. R. Martin's A Song of Ice and Fire novels
- Meera Pakam, a character in the Netflix series Grand Army
- Meera, a fictional character in the 2012 Indian film Cocktail, portrayed by Diana Penty

== Film and television ==
- Meera (1945 film), a Tamil-language film starring M. S. Subbulakshmi
- Meera (1979 film), a Hindi film by Gulzar
- Meera (1992 film), a Tamil-language film starring Vikram
- Meera (2023 film), a Gujarati film
- Meera (2009 TV series), a 2009–2010 Indian Hindi-language historical drama television series
- Meera (2010 TV series), a 2010 Indian Tamil-language soap opera

== See also ==
- Mera (disambiguation)
- Mira (disambiguation)
- Mirra Alfassa (also: The Mother, 1878–1973), spiritual collaborator of Sri Aurobindo
