= Mira (world music ensemble) =

Mira was a trans-cultural musical collaboration initiated by Martin Gordon and Peter Culshaw in 1995. Martin Gordon is well-known through his pop pedigree and his involvement with Sparks, Jet, Radio Stars, John's Children and assorted others. Peter Culshaw is a journalist/musician who worked with the West India Company. The pair began working together in Bombay in 1991 during a West India Company/Boy George recording.

Mira subsequently took shape initially as a performance art duo (under the names of Kevin Nehru and Doug Leppard) which made well-received appearances in London art galleries. Gordon and Culshaw then developed material for a live stage show ('New Hope for the Dead', choreographed by Joseph Houseal) that was performed at the Place Theatre, London, and which featured dancers, trapeze artists, martial arts performers and computer graphics. Mira's sole CD New Hope For The Dead, made an appearance in the World Music Chart Europe. The band performed at the 1997 Montreux Jazz Festival and disbanded later the same year.
