= Vila Nova de Milfontes =

- Civil parish
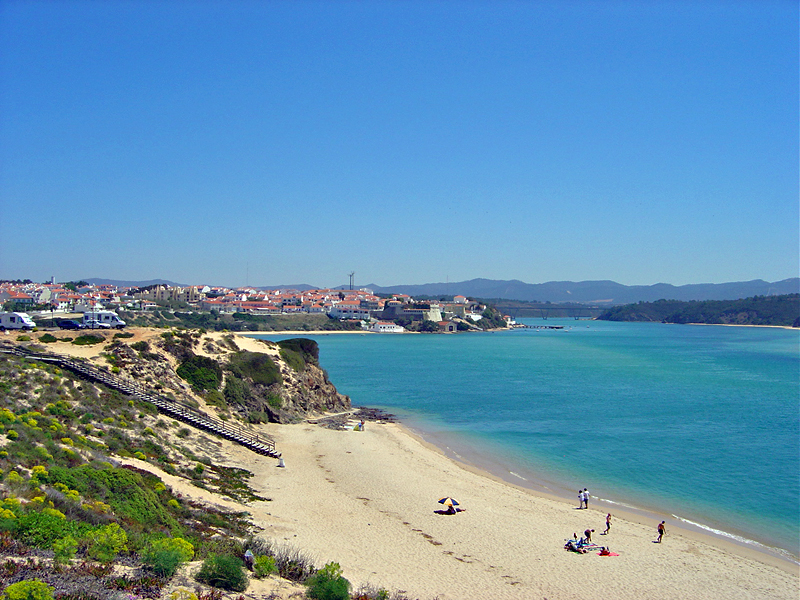
- The Mira River flows into sea at Vila Nova de Milfontes

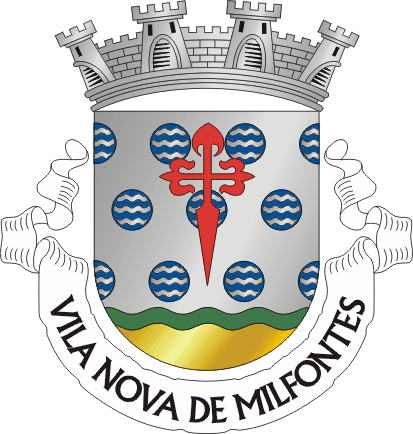
- Coat of arms

- Location in Portugal
- Coordinates: 37.725°N 8.781°W
- Country: Portugal
- Region: Alentejo
- Intermunic. comm.: Alentejo Litoral
- District: Beja
- Municipality: Odemira

Area
  - Total: 76.48 km^{2} (29.53 sq mi)
- Elevation: 0 m (0 ft)

Population (2021)
  - Total: 5,653
  - Density: 73.91/km^{2} (191.4/sq mi)
- Time zone: UTC+00:00 (WET)
  - Summer (DST): UTC+01:00 (WEST)
- Postal code: 7645
- Area code: 283
- Website: http://www.jf-vnmilfontes.pt/

Vila Nova de Milfontes is a town and civil parish (freguesia) in the municipality (concelho) of Odemira, in the Alentejo region in Portugal. The population in 2021 was 5,653, in an area of 76.48 km^{2}.

== History ==
One of the older parishes in the municipality, it was founded in 1485 by King John II. The area was constituted to serve an economic and defensive role in the Alentejo, at the confluence of the Mira River, and benefited from its strategic importance as a safe harbor. The first inhabitants were prisoners sentenced by minor crimes; 50 years later the population of the parish was little more than ten families.

The village was frequently attacked by pirates and was destroyed completely in 1590. In response, Fort São Clemente was constructed between 1599 and 1602 under the reign of King Philip II during the personal union of Spain and Portugal.

During the 19th century, the parish was integrated into the municipality of Odemira, during the administrative reforms of Mouzinho da Silveira.

Vila Nova de Milfontes was involved in Portuguese aviation, being the starting point of the Lisbon-Macau Raid. On 7 April 1924, pilots José Manuel Sarmento de Beires and pt: António Jacinto da Silva Brito Pais left Campo dos Coitos, near Milfontes on their voyage to the Far East. In homage to the aviators and their historic flight, in the Barbacã Square (alongside the fort), a monument was erected to mark their voyage.

== Geography ==
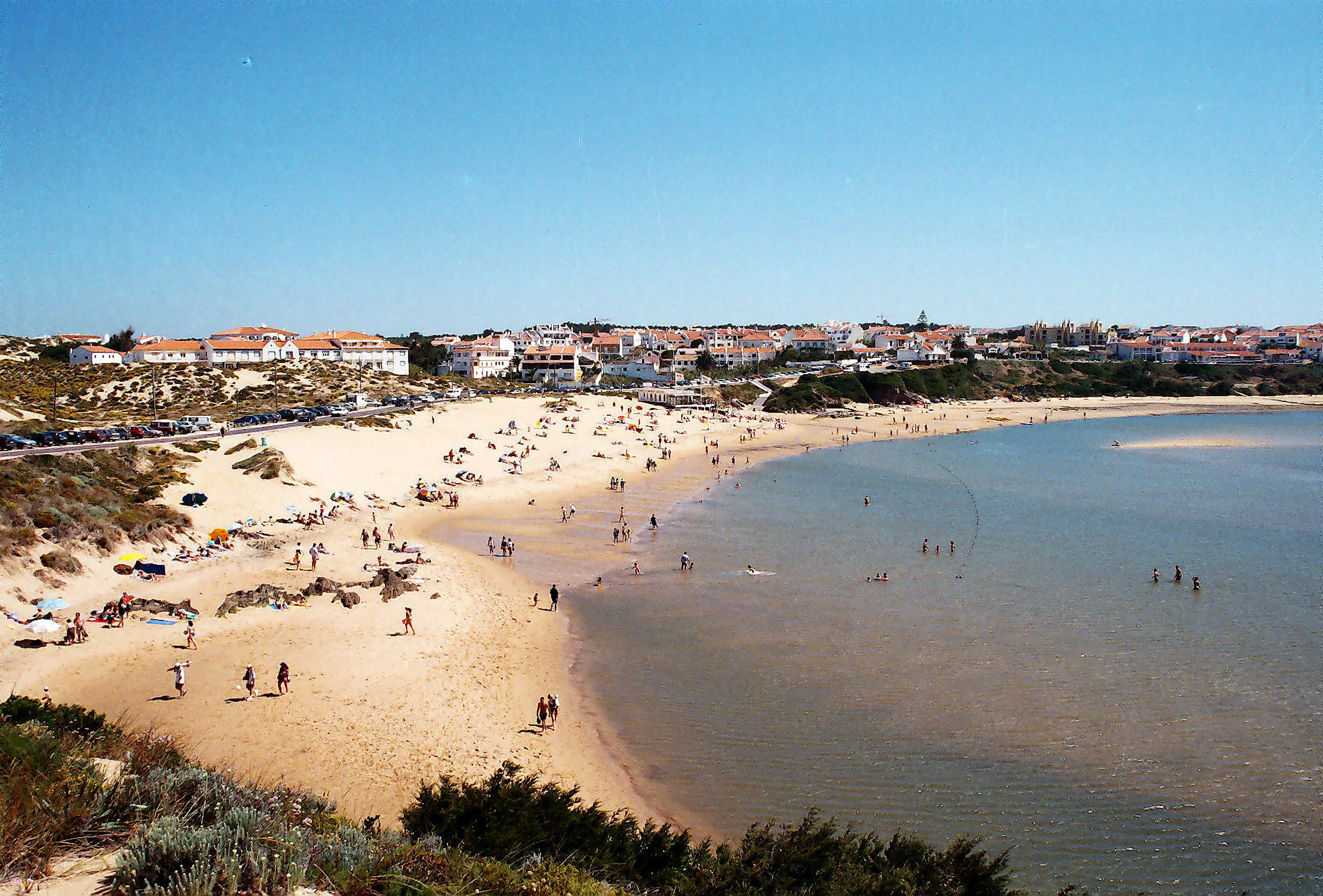
The coastal beach with the main centre of Vila Nova de Milfontes in the background

Vila Nova de Milfontes is located along the western coast of Atlantic Ocean on the northern margin of the Mira River, falling within the Nature Park of the Southwest Alentejo and Vicentine Coast. Vila Nova de Milfontes is dominated by a large estuary and ecosystem, dominated by the Mira River that gives shelter to several species of birds and marine life, in addition to wild boar and fox in the surrounding woods.

=== Beaches ===
There are several beaches near the urban areas that regularly attract tourists and surfers:

- Malhão
- Praia da Franquia (also known as Praia do Rio)
- Furnas
- Aivados
- Ribeira da Azenha
- Foz

== Economy ==
Along the river, the small fishing port is still maintained, providing a small source of income for the people. In fact, the region has developed an aquaculture centre nearby in Moinho da Asneira.

In addition, the tourist-oriented local service economy offers tourists opportunities to take part in activities like sport fishing, diving, pedestrian trails, horse trails and all-terrain sports. Moreover, the surrounding area offers ecological tourism, paragliding training, a small safari park and hideouts with small waterfalls. Due to its white sand beaches, clear water and landscape, the town, with a small resident population, attracts significant numbers of tourists annually, especially during the summer and holiday seasons.

== Notable citizens ==
- António Jacinto da Silva Brito Pais (Colos, 15 July 1884 – 22 February 1934), military officer and pilot; Brito Pais joined the Escola do Exército in 1907, becoming an infantryman and serving in the 5th Battalion and Niassa company, before returning to Portugal in 1912 (due to illness). He participated in combat in World War I, with the 15th Infantry of the Corpo Expedicionario de Portugal (Portuguese Expeditionary Corp), where he received the War Cross and French Legion of Honour. At the end of the War he was assigned the command of the Bombardment and Observation Squadron of the Republic Aviation Squadron, and in 1920, along with Sarmento Beires, made an attempt to link Madeira by air. In 1924, along with Sarmento Beires and Manuel Gouveia, they completed the first air voyage between Portugal and Macau, in their airplane Pátria, which departed Vila Nova de Milfontes.
- Custódio Brás Pacheco (1828–1883), politician, journalist and association leader; Pacheco, a tobacco factory worker in Lisbon, in 1878 he became a candidate for the Republican Party during that year's elections. In 1879, he founded the newspaper A Voz do Operário, which later gave rise to the Sociedade A Voz do Operário (later the Sociedade de Instrução e Beneficência "A Voz do Operário"). He would go on to found or collaborate in several associations, including: Centro Promotor dos Melhoramentos das Classes Laboriosas; Associação Fraternidade Operária; and Associação de Socorros Mútuos União Fraternal dos Operários da Fabricação dos Tabacos (in the last one he was a director, for several years).
- António Mantas (1875–1939), politician; an adopted son of Vila Nova de Milfontes, he married Aurora Prado, daughter of a property-owner and industrialist in Odemira, inheriting a home Milfontes, where he lived. During a decade, he was active in local affairs, supporting the interests of Milfontes, in particular, improvements to the navigability of the Mira River, when boats had a tendency to scrape the bar.

== Gallery ==
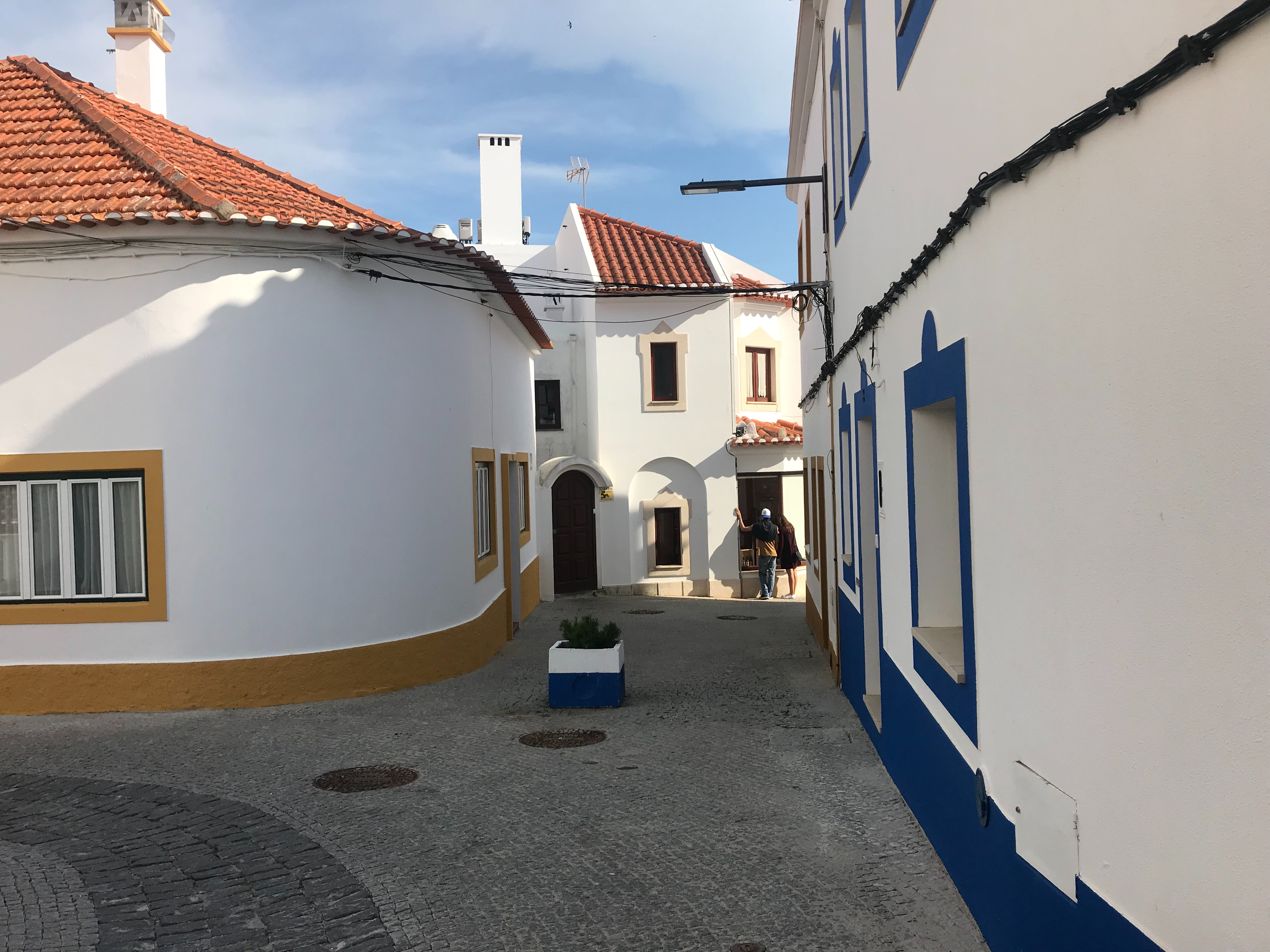
Side street in Vila Nova de Milfontes

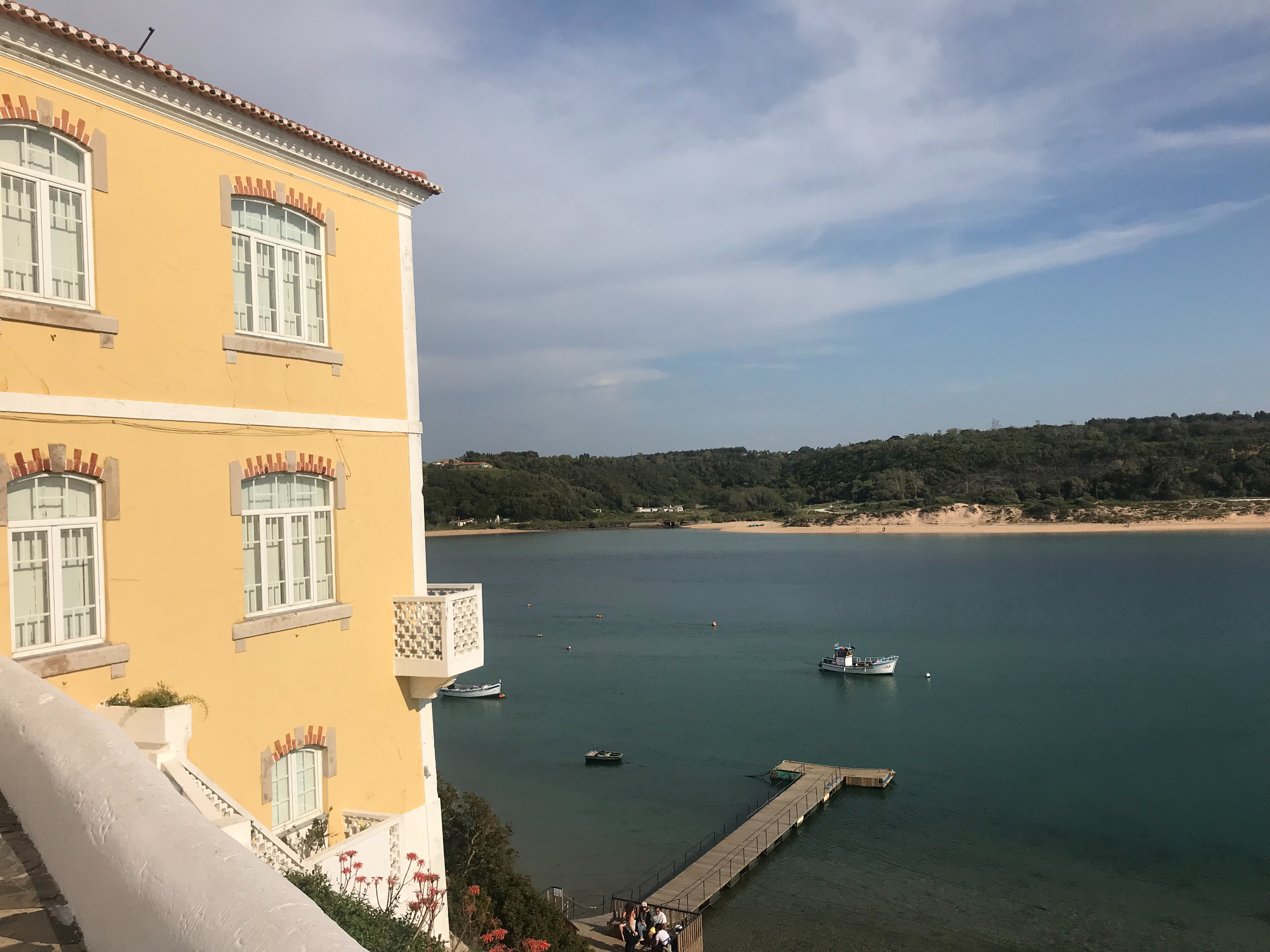
View of the Mira River

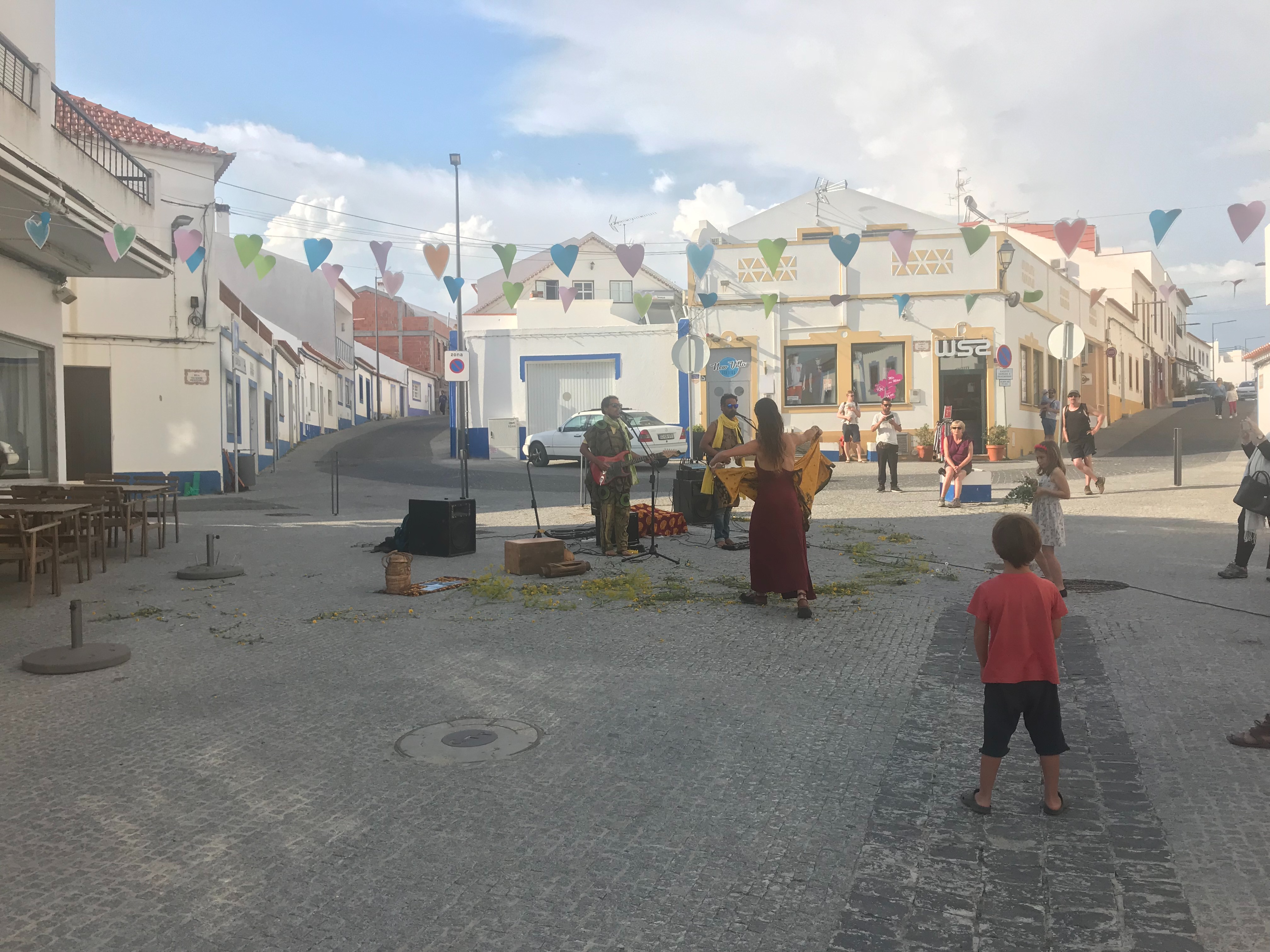
Live entertainment in the town square

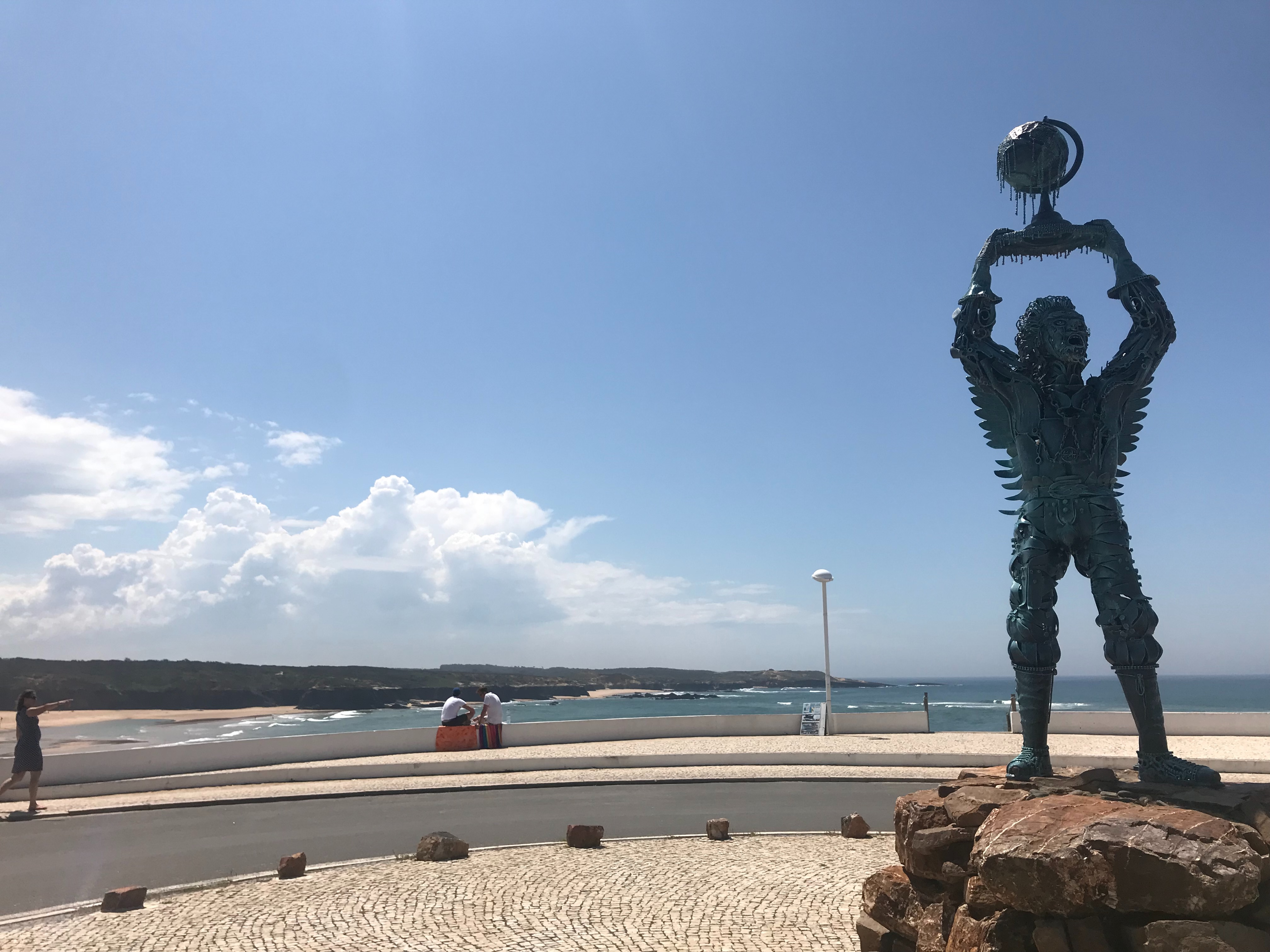
Arcanjo Statue

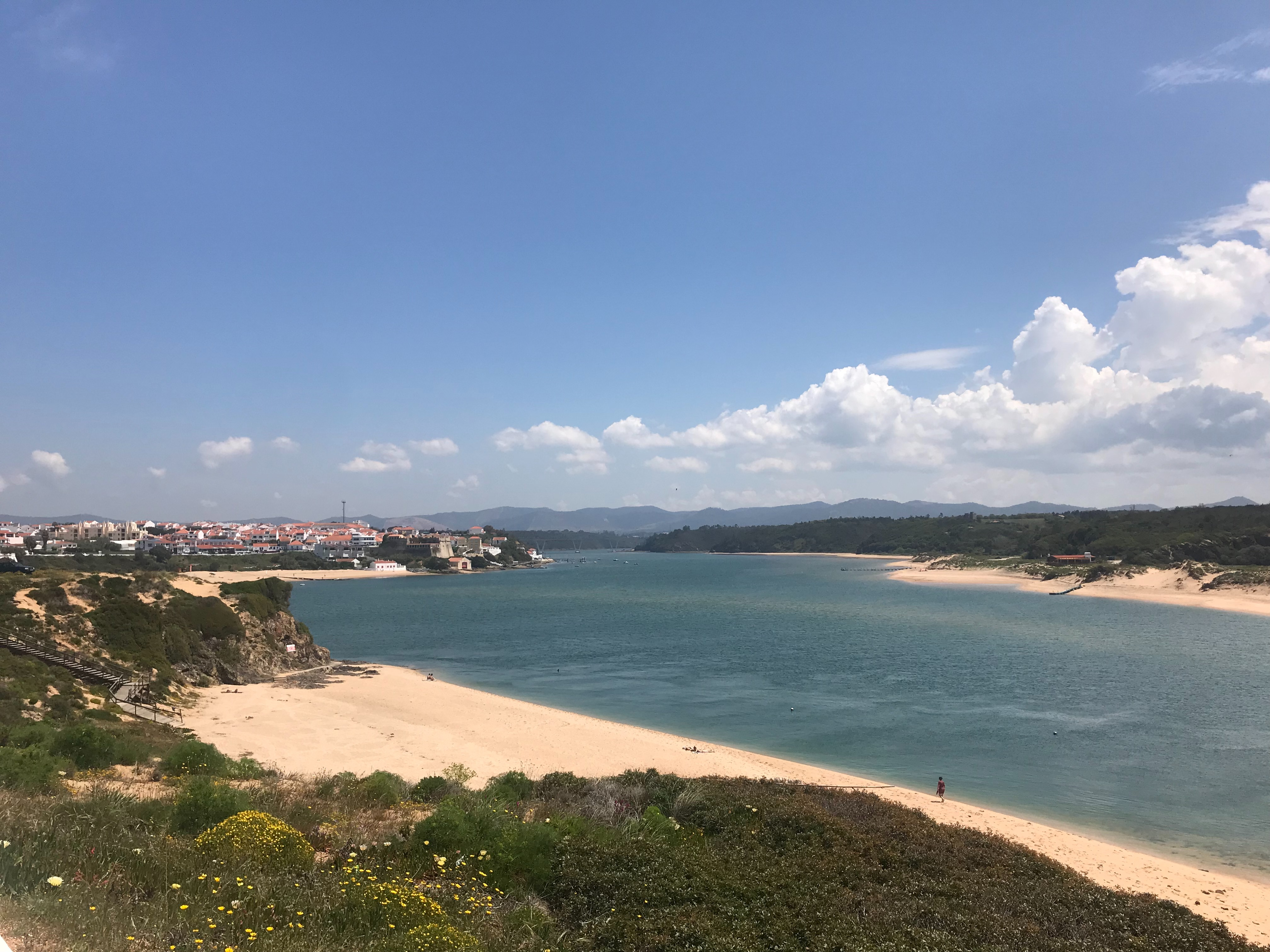
Beaches along the Mira River

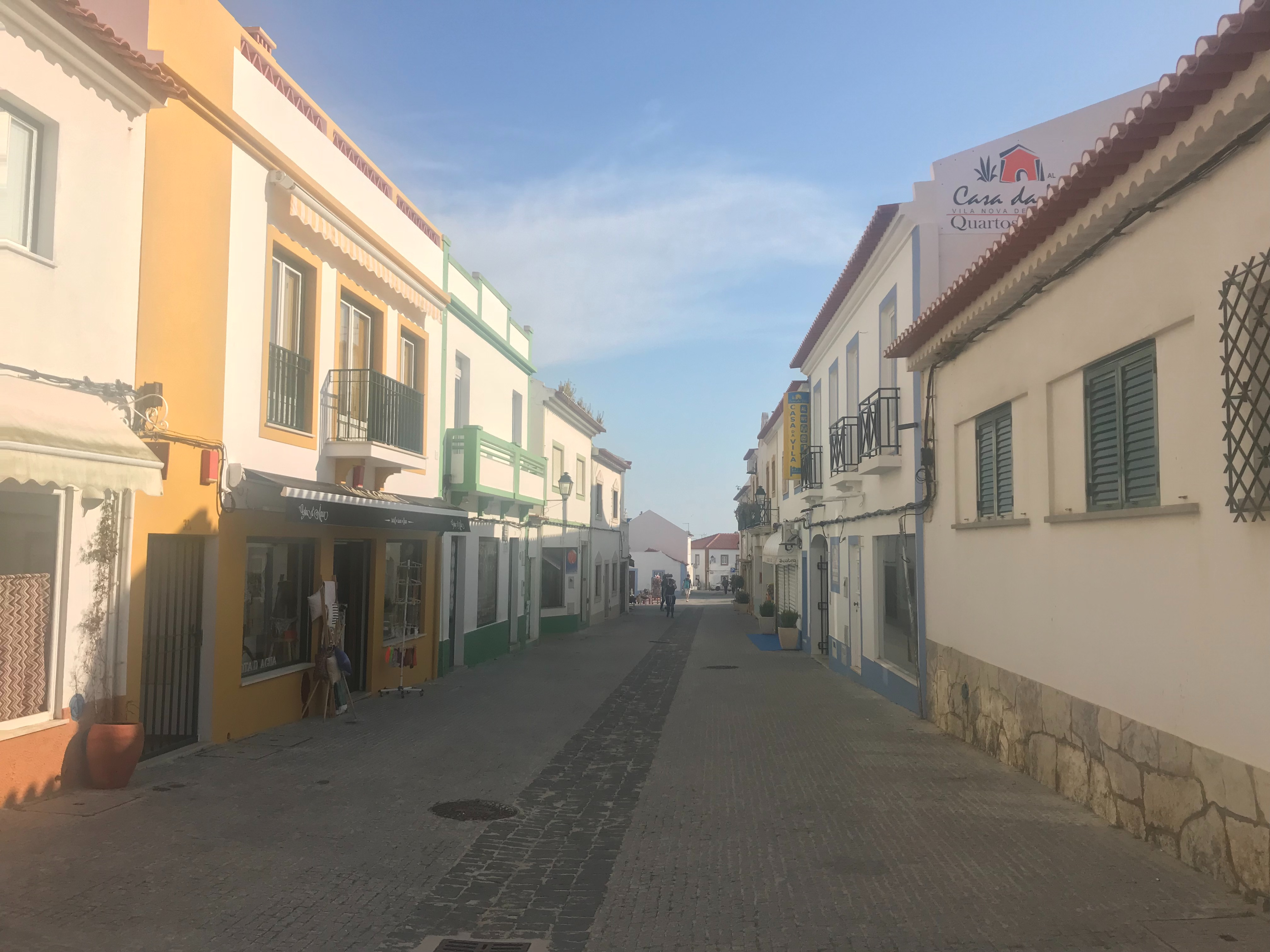
Colorful buildings line the quiet streets

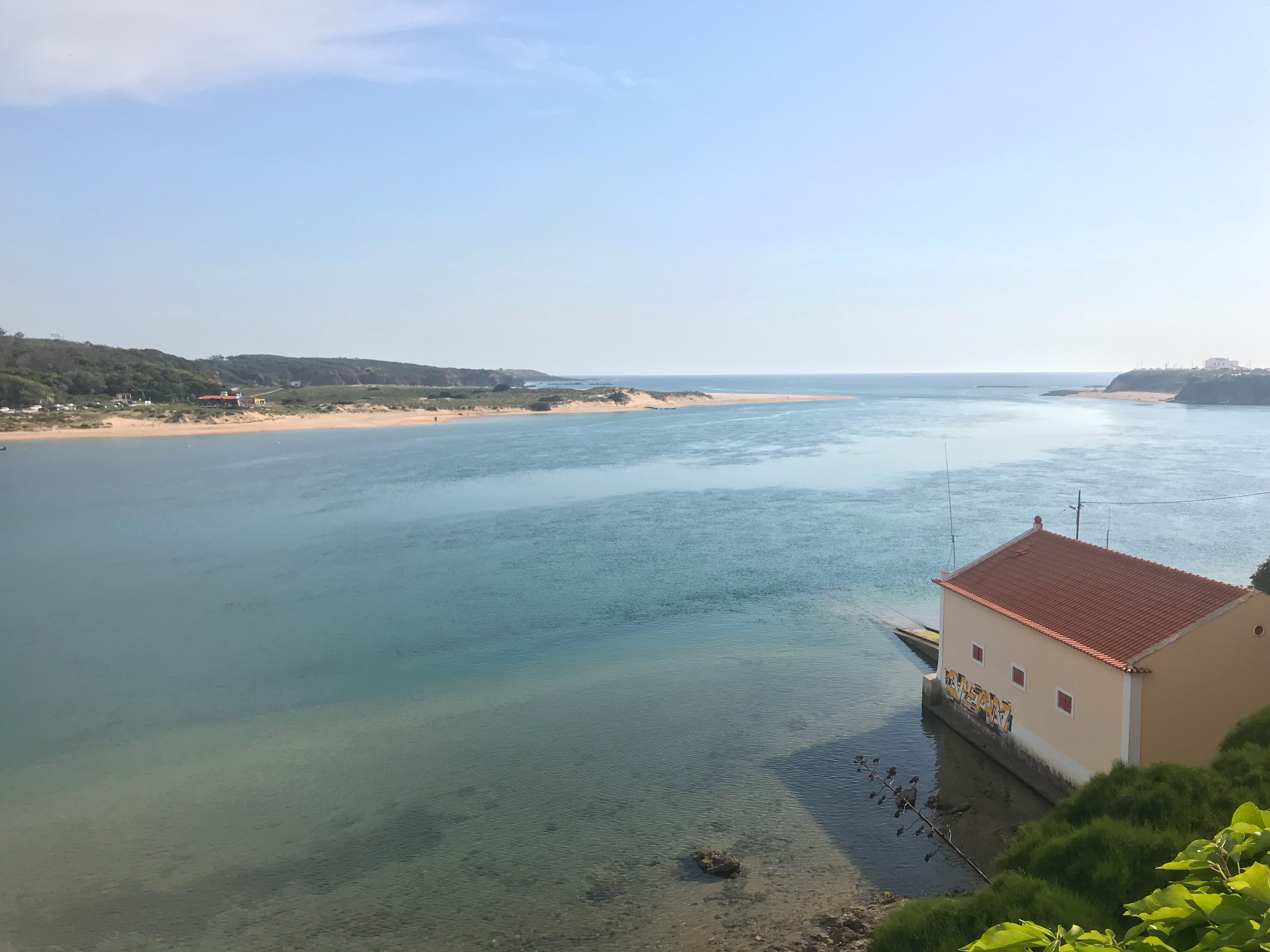
View towards the Atlantic Ocean
