= Margin-infused relaxed algorithm =

Machine learning algorithm

Margin-infused relaxed algorithm (MIRA) is a machine learning and online algorithm for multiclass classification problems. It is designed to learn a set of parameters (vector or matrix) by processing all the given training examples one-by-one and updating the parameters according to each training example, so that the current training example is classified correctly with a margin against incorrect classifications at least as large as their loss. The change of the parameters is kept as small as possible.

A two-class version called binary MIRA simplifies the algorithm by not requiring the solution of a quadratic programming problem (see below). When used in a one-vs-all configuration, binary MIRA can be extended to a multiclass learner that approximates full MIRA, but may be faster to train.

The flow of the algorithm looks as follows:

Algorithm MIRA
  Input: Training examples 
  
    
      
        T
        =
        {
        
          x
          
            i
          
        
        ,
        
          y
          
            i
          
        
        }
      
    
    {\displaystyle T=\{x_{i},y_{i}\}}
  

  Output: Set of parameters 
  
    
      
        w
      
    
    {\displaystyle w}
  

  
  
    
      
        i
      
    
    {\displaystyle i}
  
 ← 0, 
  
    
      
        
          w
          
            (
            0
            )
          
        
      
    
    {\displaystyle w^{(0)}}
  
 ← 0
  for 
  
    
      
        n
      
    
    {\displaystyle n}
  
 ← 1 to 
  
    
      
        N
      
    
    {\displaystyle N}
  

    for 
  
    
      
        t
      
    
    {\displaystyle t}
  
 ← 1 to 
  
    
      
        
          |
        
        T
        
          |
        
      
    
    {\displaystyle |T|}
  

      
  
    
      
        
          w
          
            (
            i
            +
            1
            )
          
        
      
    
    {\displaystyle w^{(i+1)}}
  
 ← update 
  
    
      
        
          w
          
            (
            i
            )
          
        
      
    
    {\displaystyle w^{(i)}}
  
 according to 
  
    
      
        {
        
          x
          
            t
          
        
        ,
        
          y
          
            t
          
        
        }
      
    
    {\displaystyle \{x_{t},y_{t}\}}
  

      
  
    
      
        i
      
    
    {\displaystyle i}
  
 ← 
  
    
      
        i
        +
        1
      
    
    {\displaystyle i+1}
  

    end for
  end for
  return 
  
    
      
        
          
            
              
                ∑
                
                  j
                  =
                  1
                
                
                  N
                  ×
                  
                    |
                  
                  T
                  
                    |
                  
                
              
              
                w
                
                  (
                  j
                  )
                
              
            
            
              N
              ×
              
                |
              
              T
              
                |
              
            
          
        
      
    
    {\displaystyle {\frac {\sum _{j=1}^{N\times |T|}w^{(j)}}{N\times |T|}}}
  

- "←" denotes assignment. For instance, "largest ← item" means that the value of largest changes to the value of item.
- "return" terminates the algorithm and outputs the following value.

The update step is then formalized as a quadratic programming problem: Find $min\|w^{(i+1)} - w^{(i)}\|$, so that $score(x_t,y_t) - score(x_t,y')\geq L(y_t,y')\ \forall y'$, i.e. the score of the current correct training $y$ must be greater than the score of any other possible $y'$ by at least the loss (number of errors) of that $y'$ in comparison to $y$.
