= Mira (surname) =

Mira is a surname. Notable people with the surname include:

- Antonietta Mira, Italian statistician
- Aurora Mira (1863–1939), Chilean painter
- Brigitte Mira (1910–2005), German actress
- George Mira (1942–2025), American National Football League quarterback
- George Mira Jr. (born c. 1965), American former college football player, son of the above
- Joan Francesc Mira i Casterà (born 1939), Valencian writer, anthropologist and sociologist
- José Palau Mira (born 1992), Spanish footballer
- Matt Mira (born 1983), American comedian
- Na Mira (born 1982), American artist, educator
- Nick Mira (born 2000), American record producer and songwriter
- Pasqual Maragall i Mira (born 1941), Spanish politician
- Pedro Solbes Mira (1942–2023), Spanish economist and government minister
