= MERA 300 =

Polish 8-bit microcomputer family

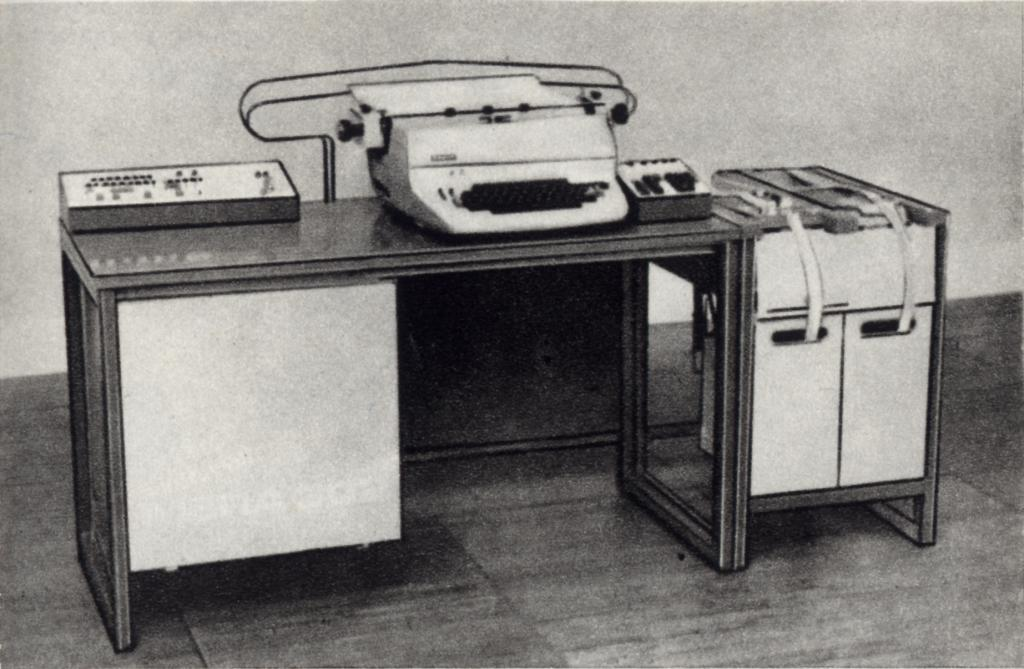
MERA 302

MERA 300 was a Polish-built 8-bit minicomputer family. It was first introduced in 1974 at the Poznań Trade Fair and Exhibition.

== History ==
The MOMIK 8-B (MERA) minicomputer had been designed in Poland in 1973. In 1974 the MERA 300 (MERA ZSM), based on the previous model, was introduced. The same year, at the Poznań International Trade Fair and Exhibition, twelve more models were displayed. MERA 300 was designed by dr. Waldemar Romaniuk and Janusz Popko.

== About the family ==
Family of the MERA 300 systems included:

- Data processing systems: MERA 300, 301, 302, 303, 304, 305, 306
- Interactive systems: MERA 342, MERA 344
- Control systems: MERA 362
- Universal and special-purpose systems: MERA 392, MERA 396

=== System architecture ===
MERA 300 included the next units:

- Processors: MOMIK 8b/100 (250 000 instructions/second)

=== MERA 300 series architecture ===
Sets of MERA 300 (MERA 302, MERA 303) included:

- Central processing unit with arithmetical unit
- Internal memory of 8000 8-bit words memory is divided into 32-word pages. Instruction memory could be accessed using an instruction pointer. Data could be addressed using page:word offset.
- Single-level interrupt system (32 interrupts),
- Channel multiplexer
- External peripherals:
  - printer
  - typewriter
  - reader
  - control console

The MERA 301 used magnetic tapes (PK-1 and PK-2) for data storage with a capacity of 0,5 million characters.

The MERA 305 was an extended version with DMA and a four-level interrupt system, with a total of 128 interrupts (4x32).

- Hard disk (licensed CDC 9425 cartridge disk drive), fixed plate and exchangeable cartridge 2.5 megabits (3.125 megabytes) each, connected via DMA channel
- 16-bit control interface used to connect e.g. CAMAC crate controllers

The MERA 306 was a more complex, extended version with features including:

- Internal memory divided to 4k-word pages, with a maximum of approximately 8, 15, 24 or 32K words of memory
- Power-outage protection
- Real-time clock (RTC) interface
- Hard disk (MERA 9425)

In addition to the above, it was possible to attach other devices:

- Monitor and keyboard
- Specialized keyboard
- Tape memory
- Measuring devices and industrial automation.

The computer's machine language consisted of 34 instructions, including arithmetical, logical and control instructions.

=== Data Input/Output ===
Data input devices for the MERA 300 series were:

- Tape reader and (CTK 50R) card reader with control unit (JS-CTK 50)
- CT 1001A tape reader with control unit (JS-CT 1001)
- CT 2000 tape reader with control unit (JS-CT 2000)

Data output devices:

- DT 105 tape puncher with control unit JS-DT 105
- DTK 50 tape and card puncher with control unit JS-DTK 50

Other input/output peripherals:

- TELETYPE MODEL 390:
  - Printing keyboard input
  - Printing data while reading from tape reader
  - Printing data while punching tapes
- FACIT 384 typewriter
- DZM 180 dot printer
- ALFA 311/M monitor:
  - Display onscreen information
  - Displaying keyboard input while recording data on a tape

=== Usage ===
- office
- collecting data
- data processing
- engineering computations
- measurement controlling
- industrial process controlling

== Software ==
- OS RTX Real Time eXecutive program

Basic system programs:

- Programmable manually from the control console
- DDT bootloader
- Standard utilities
- MOTIS editor
- Software-emulated instructions
- Programming languages:
  - Machine code
  - MOTIS assembler
  - BASIC
  - FORTRAN

It should be mentioned that the MERA 300 RTX was not necessary while the MOTIS assembler ran, as it was able to work without an operating system.

== Members of the family ==
- MERA 300
- MERA 301
- MERA 302
- MERA 303
- MERA 304
- MERA 305
- MERA 306

== Bibliography ==
- Piotr Misiurewicz, Andrzej Rydzewski: Minikomputer Mera 300. Instrukcja dla użytkownika. Wydawnictwa Politechniki Warszawskiej, Warsaw 1979. Instruction of Minikomputer Mera 300. (in Polish)
