= Motiș =

Motiș may refer to the following places in Romania:

- Motiș, a village in the town of Cehu Silvaniei, Sălaj County
- Motiș, a village in the commune of Valea Viilor, Sibiu County
- Motiș, a name for the upper course of the river Vorumloc in Sibiu County
