= Message Oriented Text Interchange Systems =

Message-Oriented Text Interchange System (MOTIS) is an ISO messaging standard based on the ITU-T X.400 standards.

It plays a similar role to the Simple Mail Transfer Protocol (SMTP) in the TCP/IP protocol suite.
