= Mira Foundation =

Blindness organization based in Quebec, Canada

The logo of the Mira Foundation

The Mira Foundation (Fondation Mira) is a Quebec-based community-based organization which pursues the following stated objective: "to bring greater autonomy to handicapped people and to facilitate their social integration by providing them with [guide and service] dogs that have been fully trained to accommodate each individual's needs of adaptation and rehabilitation." Mira assistance dogs are provided free of charge to disabled persons.

Founded in 1981 by its CEO Éric St-Pierre, "Mira Foundation services are offered to anyone presenting with one or more of the following disabilities: visual, auditory and physical."

Its head office and training facilities are located in Sainte-Madeleine, Quebec.

Among supporters and spokespeople of the Mira Foundation have been Québécois actors Robert Brouillette, Roy Dupuis, Jean L'Italien, and Stéphane Rousseau. Additionally, a known guide dog user from Mira is YouTuber Molly Burke.
