= Mira River (Portugal) =

River in southern Portugal

Coordinates: 37°43′17.3″N 8°46′56.5″W

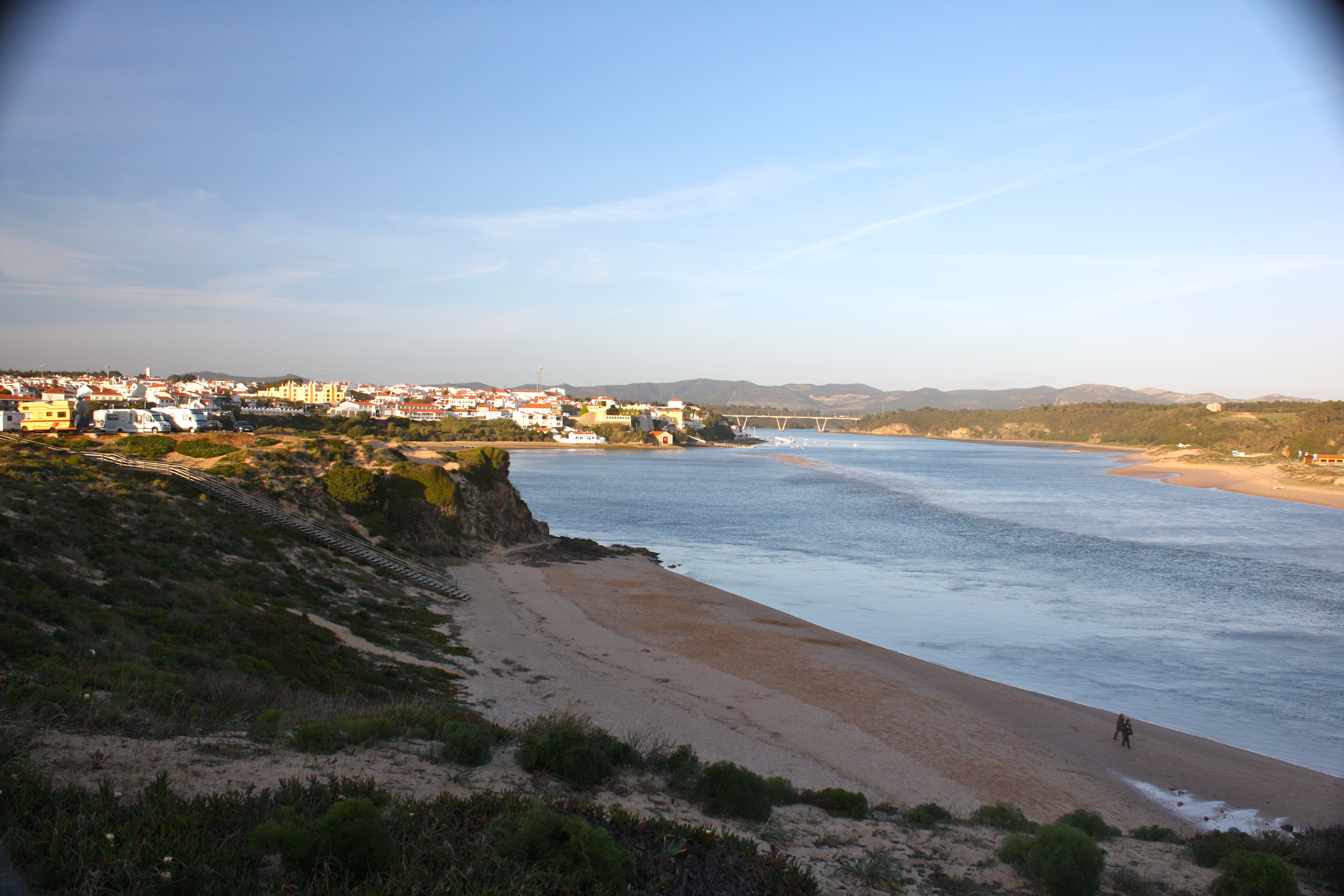
- Estuary of the Mira River in Vila Nova de Milfontes

Location
- Country: Portugal

Physical characteristics
- Source
  - location: Serra do Caldeirão, Portugal
  - elevation: approx. 470 m (1,540 ft)
- Mouth
  - location: Atlantic Ocean, Vila Nova de Milfontes, Portugal
- Length: 145 km (90 mi)
- Basin size: 1,600 km^{2} (620 sq mi)

The Mira River (Portuguese pronunciation: [ˈmiɾɐ]) is a Portuguese river in southwestern Alentejo. It is 145 kilometres (90 mi) long.

It has its sources on the northern slopes of the Serra do Caldeirão and pursues a southeast–northwest course with a generally mild inclination to the Atlantic Ocean, where it discharges through a small calm delta near the town of Vila Nova de Milfontes, 115 kilometres (71 mi) south of Lisbon. It is one of the two only rivers in Portugal with a chiefly south–north orientation (the other being its neighbour Sado) and one of the few rivers in Europe with this orientation. Mira basin borders Sado River basin at north and Guadiana River basin eastwards.

Main tributaries in the right bank: Torgal Rivulet, Luzianes River and Perna Seca River. Main tributaries in the left bank include rivers Macheira, Guilherme and Telhares.

Distributary streamlines run perpendicularly along the coastline and discharge directly to the Atlantic Ocean.

Since its name origins are prior to Roman dominion in the zone, it is believed, that the name Mira may have the same Celtic or pre-Celtic origin of that of the old city of Miróbriga (cradle of the modern city of Santiago do Cacém), the ruins of which lie 32 kilometres (20 mi) to the north. It is known that in the pantheon of the local tribes (called Celtici by the Romans) there was a god for whom devotion was made to protect the waters, whose name was Mirobieus.
