= 2018 Portuguese Social Democratic Party leadership election =

2018 Social Democratic Party leadership election
- 13 January 2018
- Turnout: 60.3% ▲13.9 pp
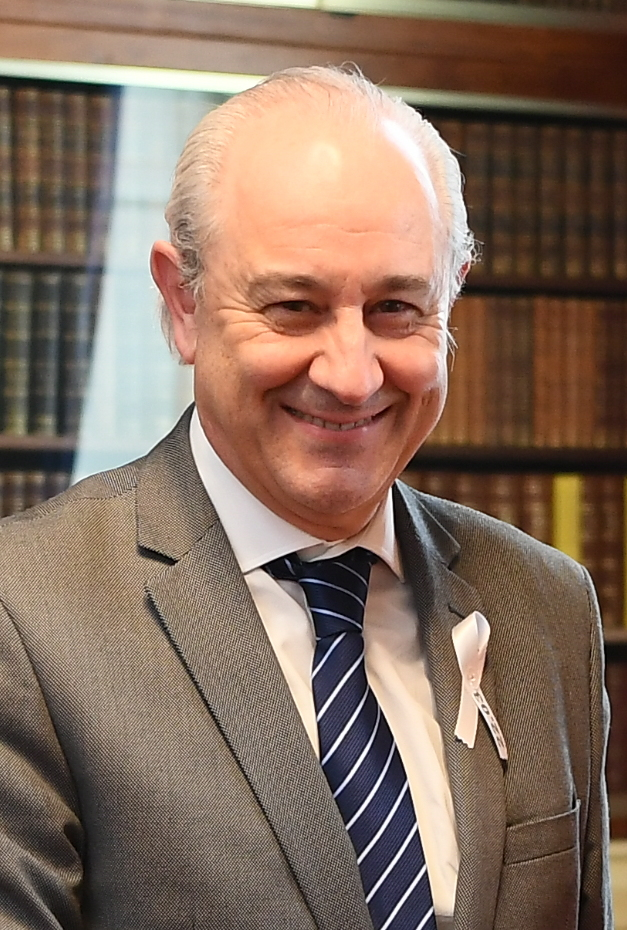

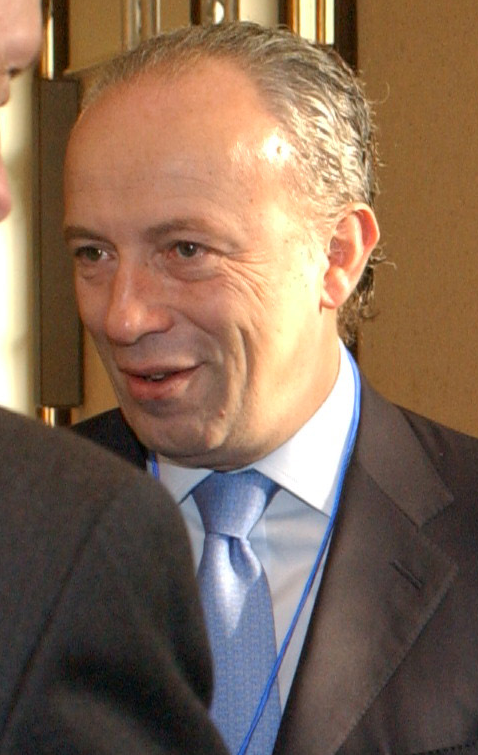
Candidate	Rui Rio	Pedro Santana Lopes
Popular vote	22,728	19,244
Percentage	54.2%	45.8%
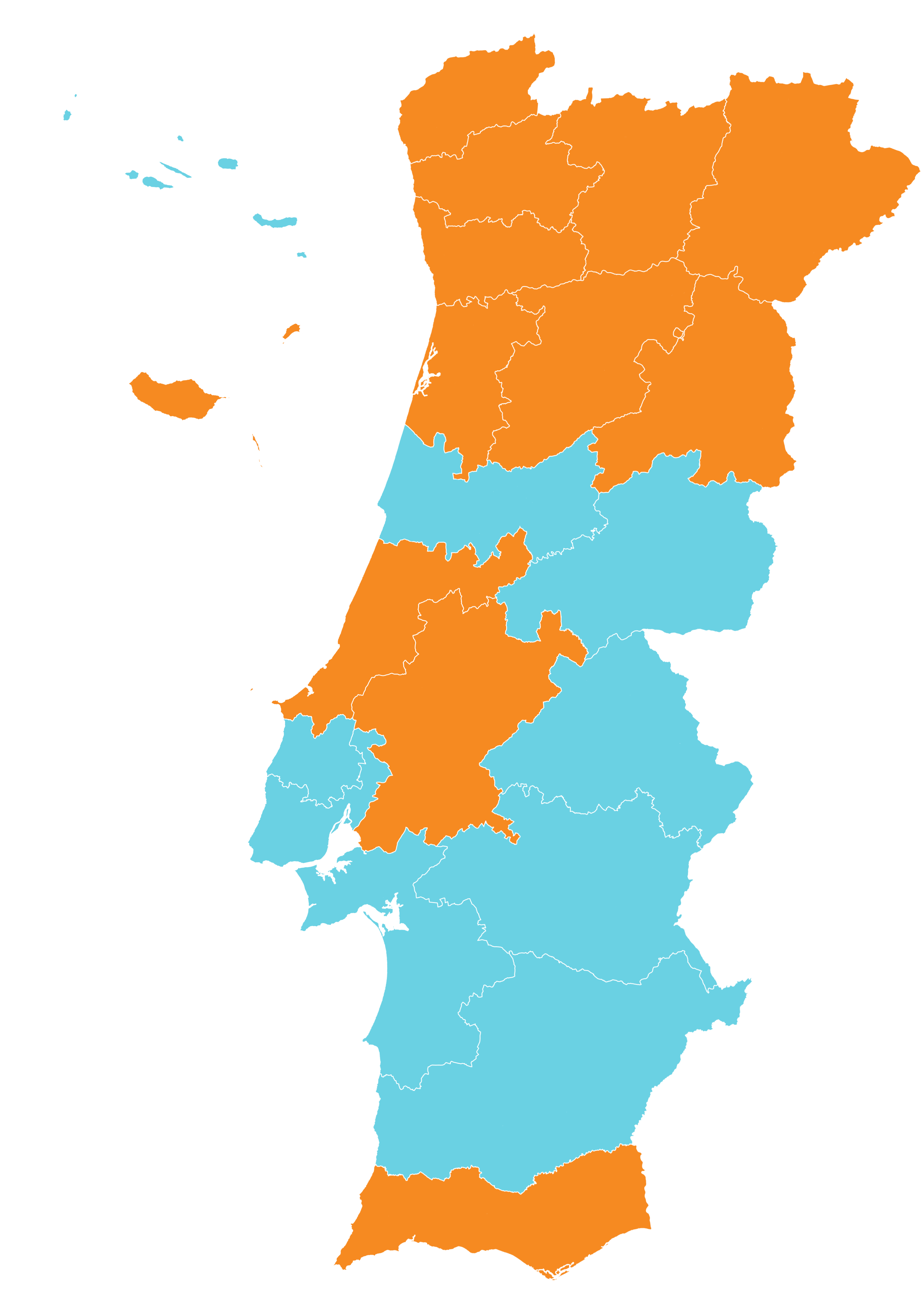
- Results by party district. Rio Santana Lopes
Leader before election
Pedro Passos Coelho
Elected Leader
Rui Rio

The 2018 Portuguese Social Democratic Party leadership election was held on 13 January 2018. The leadership election was held after then PSD leader Pedro Passos Coelho confirmed he would not run for another term in the aftermath of the poor results of the PSD in the 2017 local elections.

Only two candidates came forward: Rui Rio, former mayor of Porto, and Pedro Santana Lopes, former PSD leader, Prime Minister and mayor of Lisbon. This was Santana Lopes 5th leadership campaign, as he also ran in 1995, 1996, 2000, and 2008. As only two candidates were on the ballot, a second round wasn't necessary. On January 13, 2018, Rui Rio defeated Pedro Santana Lopes by a 54% to 46% margin, thus becoming the new leader of the PSD. Pedro Santana Lopes was, again, defeated in a PSD leadership contest for a 5th time. Rui Rio was confirmed as the new party leader on a party national congress held in Lisbon between 16 and 18 February 2018. Six months after this leadership election, Santana Lopes left the PSD to form his own party, Alliance.

== Candidates ==
Name	Born	Experience	Announcement date	Ref.
Pedro Santana Lopes	29 June 1956 (age 61); Lisbon	Prime Minister (2004-2005); President of the Social Democratic Party (2004–2005); Mayor of Lisbon (2002-2004); (2005); Mayor of Figueira da Foz (1997-2001); Secretary of State of Culture (1990-1994); Member of Parliament for Lisbon (1980–1991); (1999–2002); (2005–2009); Member of the European Parliament (1987–1989)	10 October 2017	
Rui Rio	6 August 1957 (age 60); Porto	Mayor of Porto (2001–2013); Member of Parliament for Porto (1991–2002)	11 October 2017	

=== Declined ===
- Luís Montenegro – former Parliamentary leader of the PSD (2011–2017)
- Miguel Pinto Luz – incumbent Deputy mayor of Cascais (2017–2024)
- André Ventura – candidate for Mayor of Loures in the 2017 local election (endorsed Pedro Santana Lopes)

== Opinion polls ==
=== All voters ===
Polling firm/Commissioner	Fieldwork date	Sample size			Other /None	Lead
Polling firm/Commissioner	Fieldwork date	Sample size	Rui Rio	Santana Lopes	Other /None	Lead
Aximage	6–9 Jan 2018	600	69.0	22.5	8.5	46.5
Aximage	1–4 Dec 2017	603	71.9	21.8	6.3	50.1
Aximage	4–6 Nov 2017	600	65.8	24.3	9.9	41.5
Eurosondagem	16–18 Oct 2017	1,003	43.3	42.2	12.5	1.1

=== PSD voters/members ===
Polling firm/Commissioner	Fieldwork date	Sample size			Other /None	Lead
Polling firm/Commissioner	Fieldwork date	Sample size	Rui Rio	Santana Lopes	Other /None	Lead
Eurosondagem (Note: PSD members)	7–9 Jan 2018	548	48.9	51.1	—N/a	2.2
Aximage (Note: PSD voters)	6–9 Jan 2018	600	60.4	37.1	2.5	23.3
Aximage	1–4 Dec 2017	603	70.5	26.8	2.7	43.7
Aximage	4–6 Nov 2017	600	69.6	28.0	2.4	41.6

Hypothetical polling

Polling firm	Fieldwork date	Sample size	Rui Rio	Pedro Santana Lopes	Luís Marques Mendes	Luís Montenegro	Maria Luís Albuquerque	Marco António Costa	Miguel Pinto Luz	Pedro Duarte	José Eduardo Martins	Others/ Undecided	Lead
Eurosondagem	4–11 Oct 2017	1,011	32.9	30.4	—N/a	16.9	—N/a	3.0	2.5	2.2	2.1	10.0	2.5
Eurosondagem	5–11 May 2016	1,031	32.4	—N/a	28.4	22.3	16.9	—N/a	—N/a	—N/a	—N/a	—N/a	4.0

== Results ==
Summary of the January 2018 PSD leadership election results
Candidate	13 January 2018	
Candidate	Votes	%
Rui Rio	22,728	54.15
Pedro Santana Lopes	19,244	45.85
Total	41,972	
Valid votes	41,972	98.40
Invalid and blank ballots	683	1.60
Votes cast / turnout	42,655	60.34
Registered voters	70,692	
Sources: Official results

Vote share
Rui Rio	54.15%
Pedro Santana Lopes	45.85%

== See also ==
- Social Democratic Party (Portugal)
- List of political parties in Portugal
- Elections in Portugal
