= 2020 Portuguese Social Democratic Party leadership election =

2020 Social Democratic Party leadership election
- 11–18 January 2020
- Turnout: 79.0% ▲18.7 pp First round 80.2% ▲1.2 pp Second round
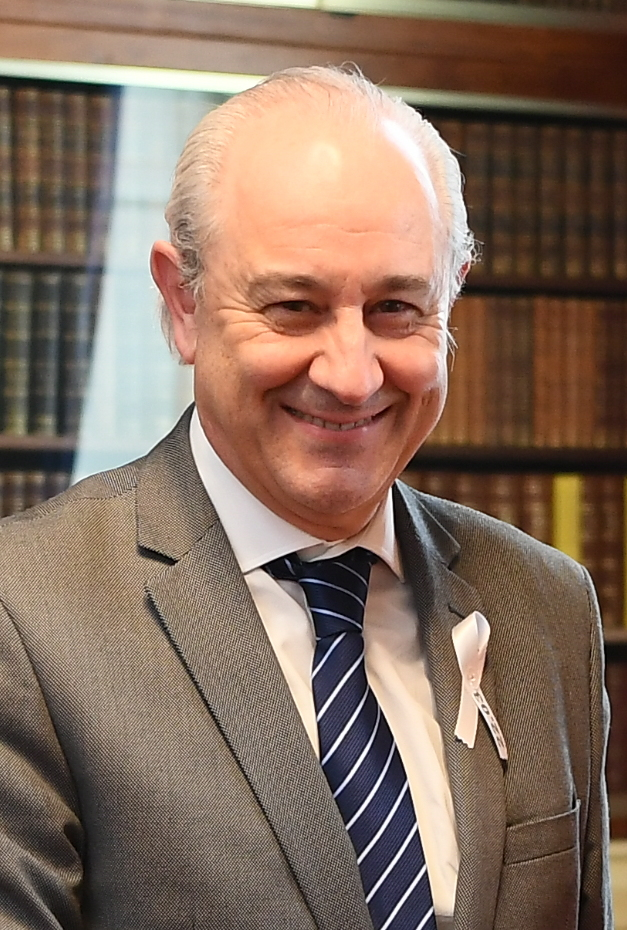

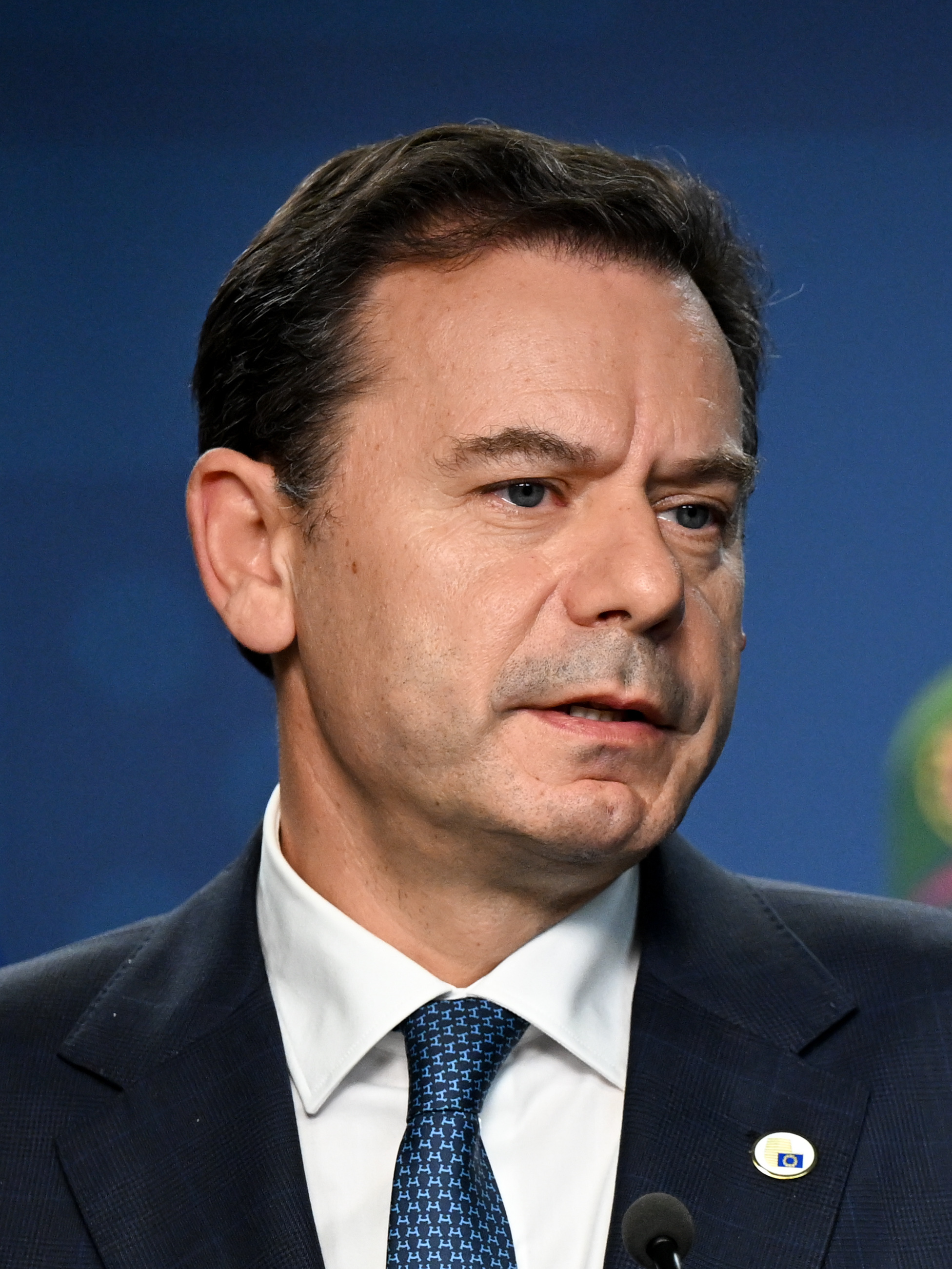

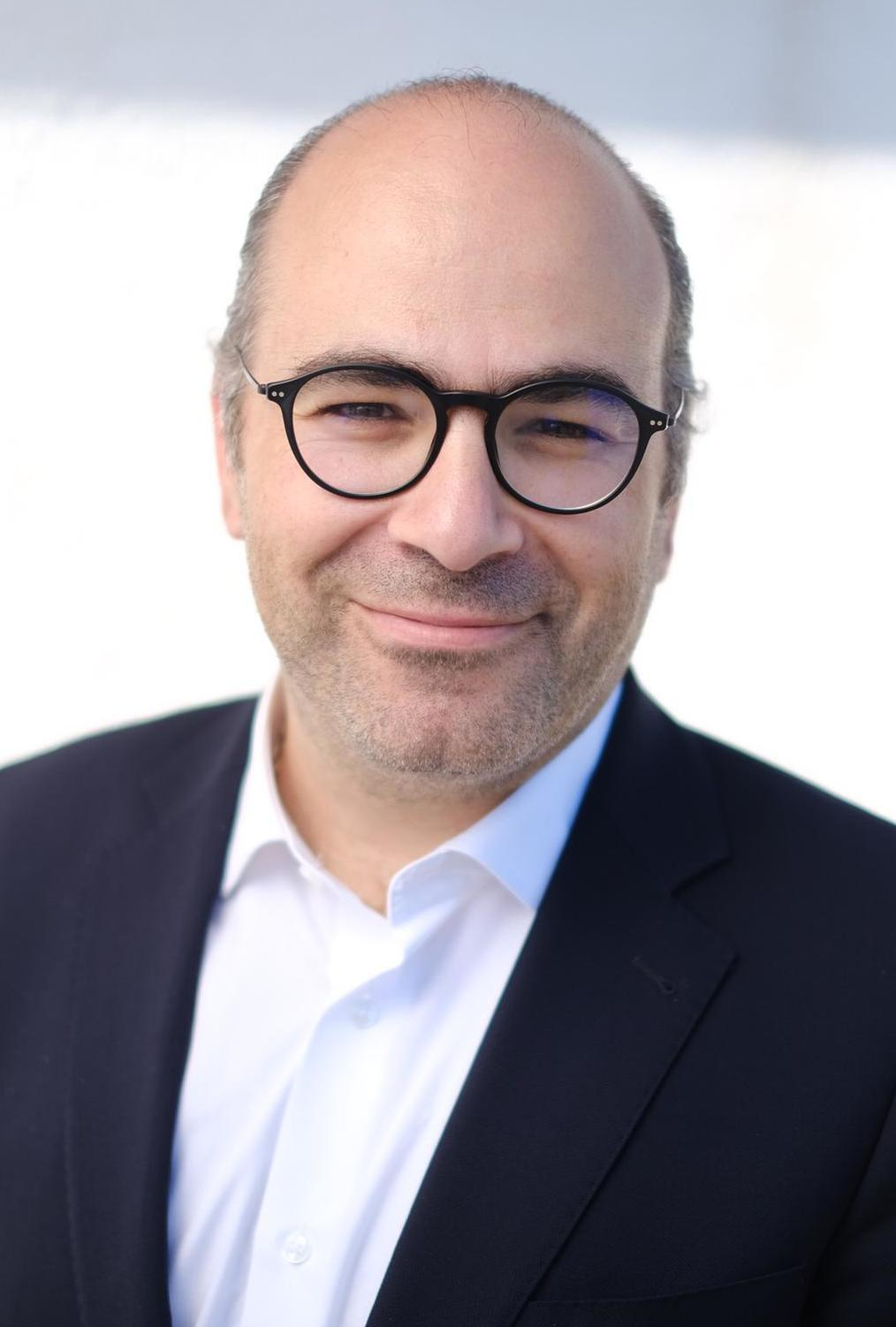
Candidate	Rui Rio	Luís Montenegro	Miguel Pinto Luz
Popular vote (1st)	15,546	13,136	3,030
Share (1st)	49.0%	41.4%	9.6%
Popular vote (2nd)	17,157	15,086	Eliminated
Share (2nd)	53.2%	46.8%
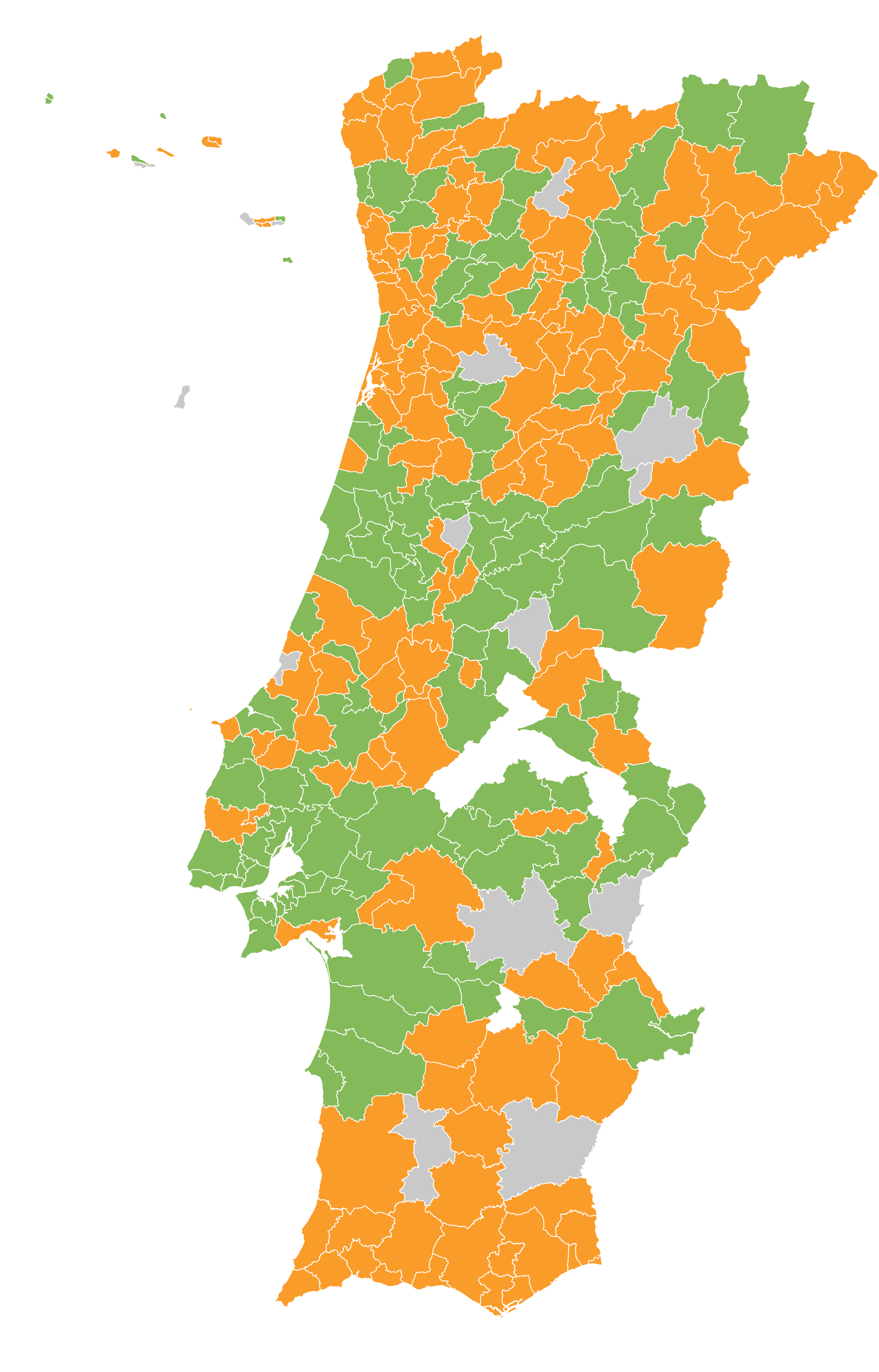
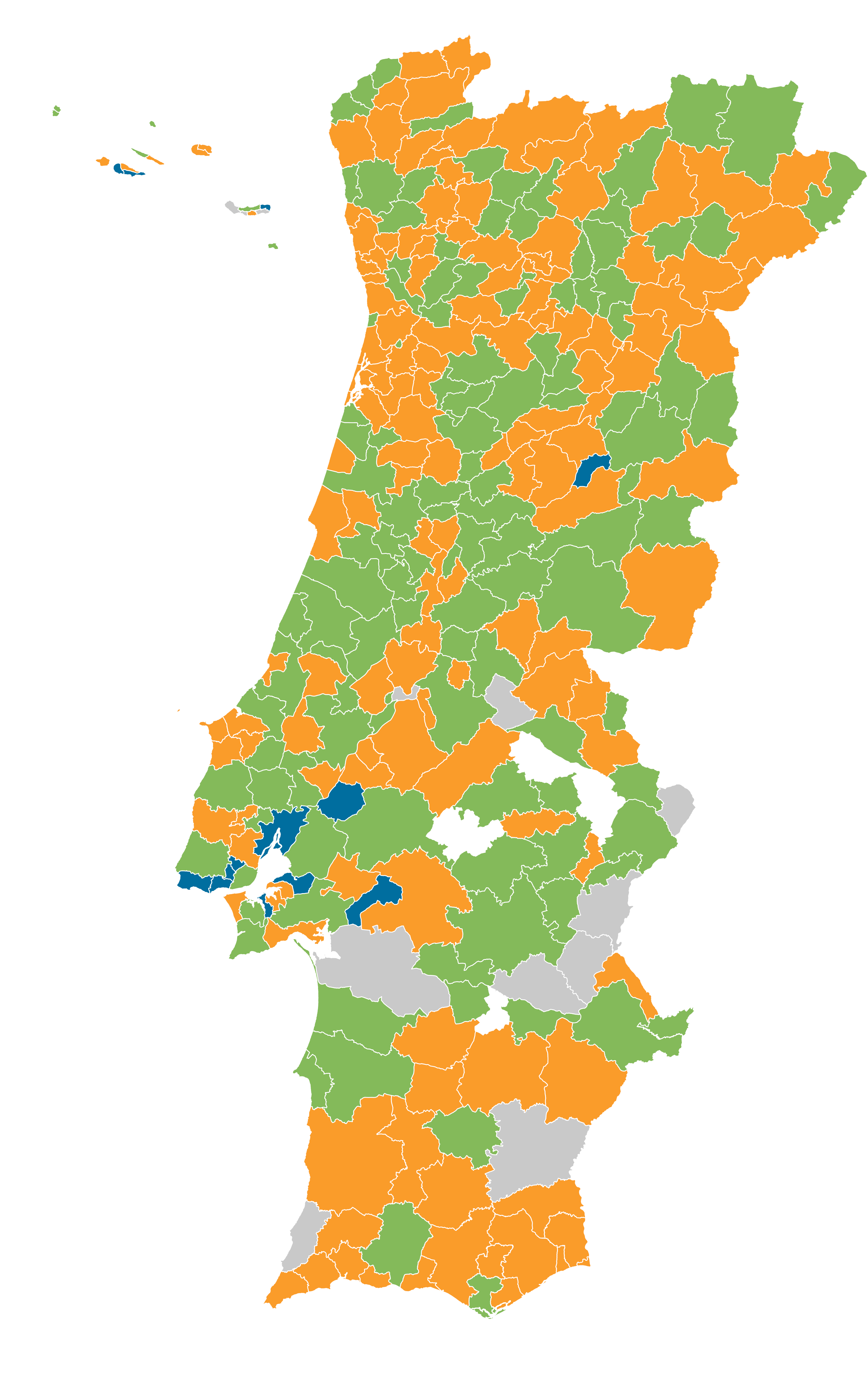
- Rio Montenegro Pinto Luz Tie
Leader before election
Rui Rio
Elected Leader
Rui Rio

The 2020 Portuguese Social Democratic Party leadership election was held on 11 and 18 January 2020. As no candidate received a majority of all valid votes on the first round, held on 11 January 2020, a second round took place one week later, 18 January, between the two candidates with the highest number of votes in the first round. This was the first time that a Social Democratic Party leadership election was contested on a second ballot. For both ballots, more than 40,000 party members, just 36 percent out of almost 110,000 active members, were registered to vote.

In the first round of the election, incumbent party leader Rui Rio finished in first place with a relative majority of 49.0% of all valid votes cast, followed by contesters Luís Montenegro, who received 41.4% of the vote, and Miguel Pinto Luz, who won 9.6% of the vote. As no candidate managed to reach the required percentage of the vote to win outright in the first round, a run-off election took place between the two candidates with the most votes in the first round: Rio and Montenegro. Rui Rio won the second round with 53.2% of the vote and was thus re-elected President of the party and stayed on as Leader of the Opposition.

== Background ==
A year earlier, in January 2019, and confronted with bad poll numbers, Rui Rio faced a leadership challenge from Luís Montenegro, pressing Rio to call a leadership election. However, Rio rejected this demand from Montenegro and instead called a motion of confidence on his leadership, which he won by a 75 to 50 vote. After the motion of confidence was approved, Montenegro withdrew his candidacy to the leadership.

Rio would lead his party into the 2019 Portuguese legislative election, where the PSD polled second with nearly 28% of the votes.

== Candidates ==
Name	Born	Experience	Announcement date	Ref.
Luís Montenegro	16 February 1973 (age 46); Porto	Leader of the Social Democratic Parliamentary Caucus (2011–2017); Member of Parliament for Aveiro (2002–2017)	9 October 2019	
Miguel Pinto Luz	8 February 1977 (age 42); Lisbon	Deputy Mayor of Cascais (2017–2024); Secretary of State for Infrastructure, Transportation, and Communications (2015)	18 October 2019	
Rui Rio	6 August 1957 (age 62); Porto	President of the Social Democratic Party (2018–2022); Leader of the Opposition (2018–2022); Member of Parliament for Porto (2019–2022); Mayor of Porto (2001–2013); Member of Parliament for Porto (1991–2002)	21 October 2019	

=== Declined ===
- Miguel Morgado – former Member of Parliament for Porto (2015–2019) (endorsed Luís Montenegro)
- Jorge Moreira da Silva – former Minister of the Environment, Territorial Planning and Energy (2013–2015)
- Pedro Duarte – former President of the Social Democratic Youth (1998–2002) (endorsed Luís Montenegro)

== Opinion polls ==
=== All voters ===
Polling firm/Commissioner	Fieldwork date	Sample size				Other /None	Lead
Polling firm/Commissioner	Fieldwork date	Sample size	Rui Rio	Luís Montenegro	Miguel Pinto Luz	Other /None	Lead
Eurosondagem	8–12 Dec 2019	1,019	24.1	25.0	13.8	37.1	0.9
Intercampus	20–26 Nov 2019	604	40.6	14.2	3.3	41.9	26.4

=== PSD voters ===
Polling firm/Commissioner	Fieldwork date	Sample size				Other /None	Lead
Polling firm/Commissioner	Fieldwork date	Sample size	Rui Rio	Luís Montenegro	Miguel Pinto Luz	Other /None	Lead
Eurosondagem	8–12 Dec 2019	1,019	24.2	27.4	15.4	33.0	3.2

== Results ==
Summary of the January 2020 PSD leadership election results
Candidate	1st Round 11 January 2020		2nd Round 18 January 2020	
Candidate	Votes	%	Votes	%
Rui Rio	15,546	49.02	17,157	53.21
Luís Montenegro	13,136	41.42	15,086	46.79
Miguel Pinto Luz	3,030	9.55	Eliminated	
Total	31,712		32,243	
Valid votes	31,712	98.85	32,243	98.96
Invalid and blank ballots	369	1.15	339	1.04
Votes cast / turnout	32,081	79.01	32,582	80.20
Registered voters	40,604		40,628	
Sources: 1st Round results, 2nd Round results

Vote share 1st Round
Rui Rio	49.02%
Luís Montenegro	41.42%
Miguel Pinto Luz	9.55%

Vote share 2nd Round
Rui Rio	53.21%
Luís Montenegro	46.79%

== See also ==
- Social Democratic Party (Portugal)
- List of political parties in Portugal
- Elections in Portugal
