= 2022 Portuguese Social Democratic Party leadership election =

2022 Social Democratic Party leadership election
- 28 May 2022
- Turnout: 60.5% ▼17.7 pp
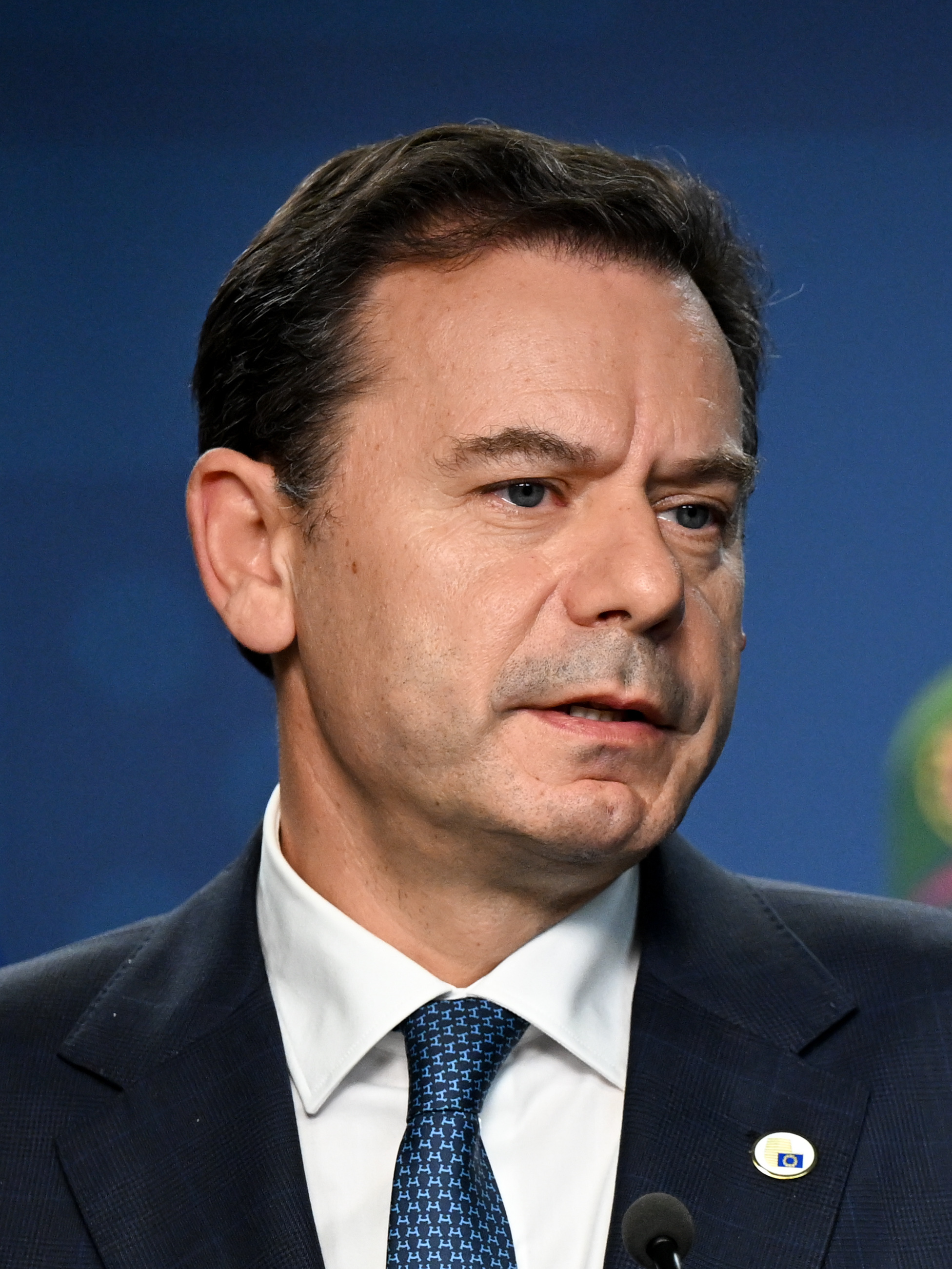

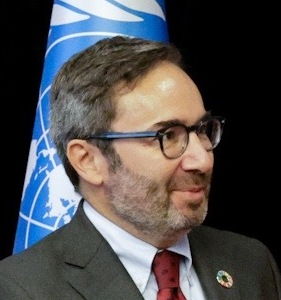
Candidate	Luís Montenegro	Jorge Moreira da Silva
Popular vote	19,241	7,306
Percentage	72.5%	27.5%
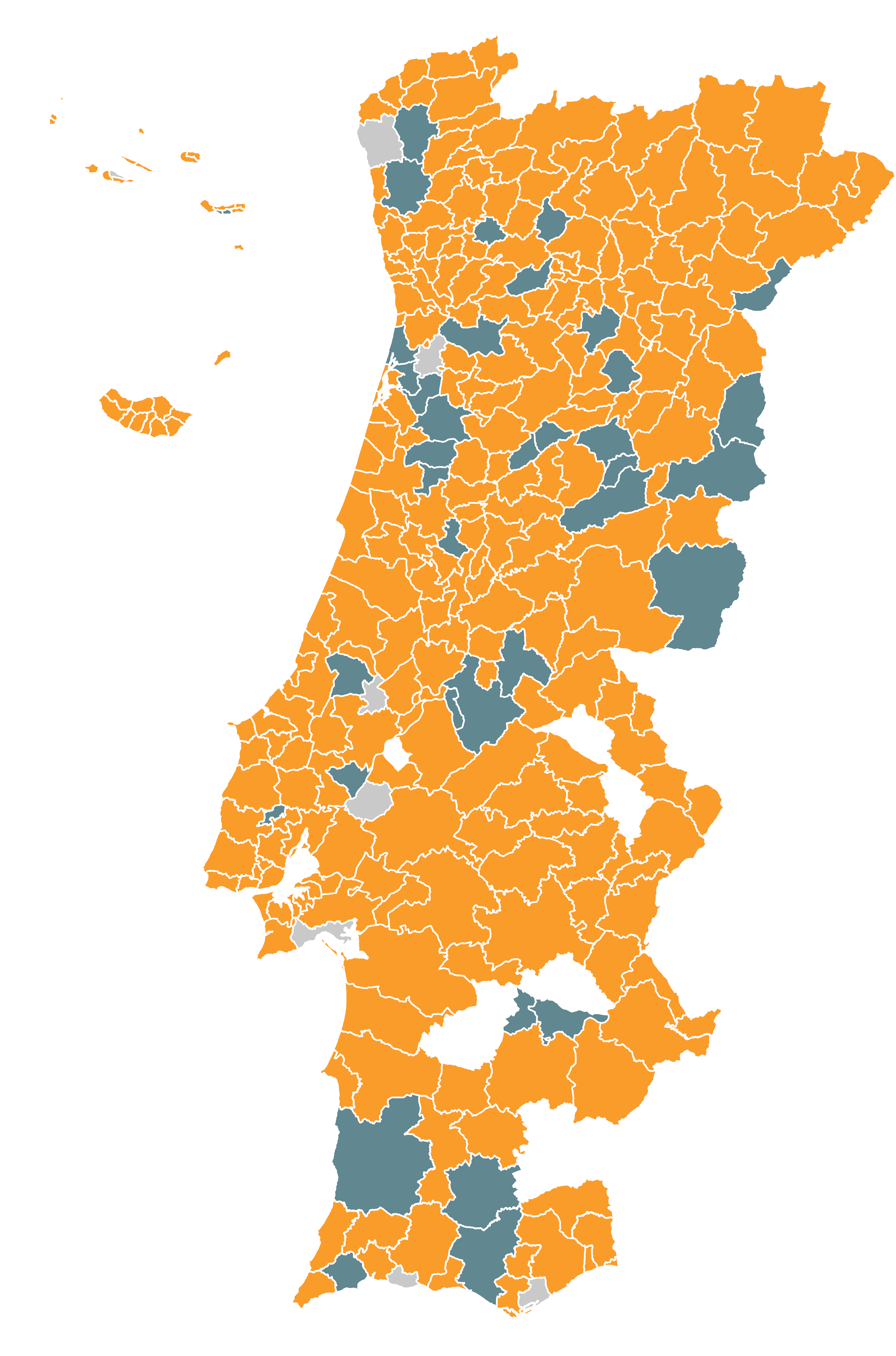
- Results by municipality. Montenegro Moreira da Silva Tie
Leader before election
Rui Rio
Elected Leader
Luís Montenegro

The 2022 Portuguese Social Democratic Party leadership election was held on 28 May 2022. If no candidate achieved more than 50% of the votes in the first round, a second round would be held between the two most voted candidates in the first round on 4 June 2022, however, as only two candidates were on the ballot, Luís Montenegro and Jorge Moreira da Silva, a second round was not necessary. Nearly 45,000 party members, out of more than 85,000 active members, were registered to vote.

The elections came after the defeat of the Social Democratic Party (PSD) in the 2022 Portuguese legislative election, where António Costa of the Socialist Party (PS) achieved an absolute majority. During election night, Rui Rio, the then incumbent leader of the PSD, declared that he didn't see how he could be useful in a PS majority. On 3 February 2022, Rio announced his intention of leaving the PSD leadership and proposed the calling of a snap leadership election.

Luís Montenegro, the centre-right wing candidate, defeated Jorge Moreira da Silva, the centrist to centre-left wing candidate, by a landslide, 72% to 28%, and was elected as the new PSD leader; however, turnout dropped to just above 60%. Montenegro won all the districts in the country and didn't prevail in just 38 municipalities, out of 308.

== Candidates ==
Name	Born	Experience	Announcement date	Ref.
Luís Montenegro	16 February 1973 (age 49); Porto	Leader of the Social Democratic Parliamentary Caucus (2011–2017); Member of Parliament for Aveiro (2002–2017)	29 March 2022	
Jorge Moreira da Silva	24 April 1971 (age 51); Vila Nova de Famalicão	Minister of the Environment, Territorial Planning and Energy (2013–2015); Member of Parliament for Lisbon (2005–2006); Member of Parliament for Braga (1995–1999), (2015–2016); Member of the European Parliament (1999–2003); President of the Social Democratic Youth (1995–1998)	1 April 2022	

=== Declined ===
- Rui Rio – incumbent President of the Social Democratic Party and Leader of the Opposition (2018–2022); former Mayor of Porto (2001–2013);
- Luís Marques Mendes – political commentator; former leader of the Social Democratic Party (2005–2007);
- Carlos Moedas – incumbent Mayor of Lisbon (since 2021); former European Commissioner for Research, Science and Innovation (2014–2019);
- Pedro Passos Coelho – former Prime Minister (2011–2015); former leader of the Social Democratic Party (2010–2018);
- Paulo Rangel – Member of the European Parliament (2009–2024); candidate for the party leadership in the 2021 elections;
- Miguel Poiares Maduro – former Minister for Regional Development (2013–2015);
- José Ribau Esteves – incumbent Mayor of Aveiro (2013–2025); former Mayor of Ílhavo (1998–2013);
- Miguel Pinto Luz – deputy mayor of Cascais (2017–2024); candidate for the party leadership in the 2020 elections;
- Pedro Rodrigues – former Social Democratic Youth leader (2007–2010); former member of the Assembly of the Republic (2019–2022; 2009–2011);
- André Coelho Lima – Member of the Assembly of the Republic from Braga (2019–2024).

== Opinion polls ==
=== All voters ===
Polling firm/Commissioner	Fieldwork date	Sample size			Others /Undecided	Lead
Polling firm/Commissioner	Fieldwork date	Sample size	Montenegro	Moreira da Silva	Others /Undecided	Lead
Aximage	19–24 May 2022	805	21	21	58	Tie
Intercampus	7–15 May 2022	611	54.7	32.1	13.2	22.6

=== PSD voters ===
Polling firm/Commissioner	Fieldwork date	Sample size			Others /Undecided	Lead
Polling firm/Commissioner	Fieldwork date	Sample size	Montenegro	Moreira da Silva	Others /Undecided	Lead
Aximage	19–24 May 2022	805	41	22	37	19

== Results ==
Summary of the May 2022 PSD leadership election results
Candidate	28 May 2022	
Candidate	Votes	%
Luís Montenegro	19,241	72.48
Jorge Moreira da Silva	7,306	27.52
Total	26,547	
Valid votes	26,547	98.38
Invalid and blank ballots	437	1.62
Votes cast / turnout	26,984	60.46
Registered voters	44,628	
Sources: Official results

Vote share
Luis Montenegro	72.48%
Jorge Moreira da Silva	27.52%

=== Results by party federation ===
The following table shows a breakdown of the results of the election by party federation, which are mostly equal to the electoral circles.

Result breakdown of the 2022 Portuguese Social Democratic Party leadership election
Federation	Luís Montenegro		Jorge Moreira da Silva		Invalid ballots	Votes cast	Registered
Federation	Votes	%	Votes	%	Invalid ballots	Votes cast	Registered
Algarve	501	58.53	355	41.47	10	866	1,314
Aveiro	1,734	64.73	945	35.27	56	2,735	4,581
Baixo Alentejo	166	77.93	47	22.07	3	216	322
Braga	2,533	66.61	1,270	33.39	68	3,871	6,533
Bragança	760	85.88	125	14.12	15	900	1,305
Castelo Branco	285	68.67	130	31.33	9	424	714
Coimbra	780	75.36	255	24.64	26	1,061	1,743
Évora	205	75.93	65	24.07	3	273	463
Guarda	610	76.25	190	23.75	11	811	1,210
Leiria	818	77.32	240	22.68	21	1,079	1,934
Lisbon: Urban Area	2,069	69.57	905	30.43	44	3,018	5,668
Lisbon: Oeste	173	71.19	70	28.81	6	249	400
Portalegre	138	75.82	44	24.18	1	183	286
Porto	3,134	72.83	1,169	27.17	75	4,378	7,671
Santarém	604	77.84	172	22.16	14	790	1,332
Setúbal	484	66.12	248	33.88	19	751	1,256
Viana do Castelo	602	74.50	206	25.50	23	831	1,162
Vila Real	937	80.02	234	19.98	7	1,178	1,658
Viseu	1115	77.00	333	23.00	10	1,458	1,989
Azores	353	75.43	115	24.57	2	470	691
Madeira	1,152	87.71	162	12.29	14	1,332	2,261
Europe	75	81.52	17	18.48	0	92	118
Outside of Europe	9	50.00	9	50.00	0	18	18

== See also ==
- Elections in Portugal
- List of political parties in Portugal
