= Rui Rio =

Portuguese politician (born 1957)

Rui Rio GCIH
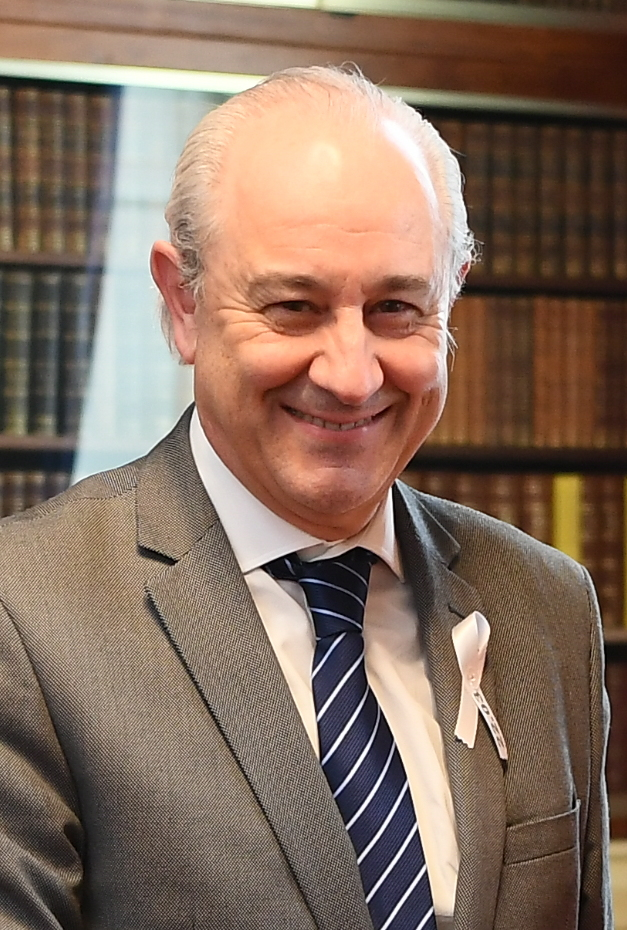
- Rio in March 2018

President of the Social Democratic Party
- In office 16 February 2018 – 1 July 2022
- Secretary-General: Feliciano Barreiras Duarte; José Silvano
- Preceded by: Pedro Passos Coelho
- Succeeded by: Luís Montenegro

Leader of the Opposition
- In office 16 February 2018 – 1 July 2022
- Preceded by: Pedro Passos Coelho
- Succeeded by: Luís Montenegro

Mayor of Porto
- In office 8 January 2002 – 22 October 2013
- Preceded by: Nuno Cardoso
- Succeeded by: Rui Moreira

Secretary-General of the Social Democratic Party
- In office 31 March 1996 – 20 June 1997
- President: Marcelo Rebelo de Sousa
- Preceded by: Eduardo Azevedo Soares
- Succeeded by: Carlos Horta e Costa

Member of the Assembly of the Republic
- In office 25 October 2019 – 12 September 2022
- Constituency: Porto
- In office 4 November 1991 – 4 April 2002
- Constituency: Porto

Personal details
- Born: Rui Fernando da Silva Rio; 6 August 1957 (age 68) Porto, Portugal
- Party: Social Democratic Party
- Spouse: Lídia Azevedo
- Children: 1
- Education: Colégio Alemão do Porto
- Alma mater: University of Porto

Rui Fernando da Silva Rio GCIH (born 6 August 1957) is a Portuguese economist and retired politician of the Social Democratic Party (PSD). He was the Mayor of Porto from 2002 to 2013. Between 2018 and 2022, he was President of the PSD and Leader of the Opposition.

== Education ==
Rio studied at the Colégio Alemão do Porto (the German School of Porto), and earned his degree in economics at the University of Porto, where he was president of the Student Association, at the time the only Student Association that was not led by members of the Communist Party, and a member of the Pedagogical Council.

== Professional career ==
As an economist, he began his professional life in the textile industry, having, after completing his military service, also worked in the metalmechanics industry.

In the mid-1980s, he began his path in the banking sector. Within the management of Banco Comercial Português, he was responsible for setting up financial operations in the primary market, for the listing process of the Stock Exchange, for the study and design of new financial products and also for part of the human resources' training in the Capital Markets area.

Since January 2014, he had resumed his activity at Millennium BCP, joining the Investment Committee of the Millennium Capitalization Fund, even though he is an independent and non-executive member.

He is Vice-President of the General Assembly of the Order of Chartered Accountants. He was also the financial director of the CIN paint factory, with special responsibility for the company's relationship with the Capital Markets.

He held the positions of member of the Supervisory Board of Caixa Geral de Depósitos (CGD), of non-executive director of the company Metro do Porto and Chairman of 32 Senses SGPS.

After having interrupted his activity as an economist during the period in which he was professionally active in politics, in March 2014 he took on positions at Boyden - Executive Search and at Neves de Almeida | HR Consulting, companies in the area of human resources management.

He was President of the general meeting of the Northern Regional Section Bureau of the Order of Economists.

He published Política In Situ (2002) and Analysis of the Regional Distribution of Public Investment (Análise à Distribuição Regional do Investimento Público) (1999), with articles published in the newspapers O Comércio do Porto, Público and Diário Económico. He was distinguished with the Marketing Cities and Regions Personality Award in 2004 and, in 2005, with the Alfredo César Torres Award. In 2012, he won the Career Award from the Faculty of Economics of Porto.

In 2014, his biography entitled Rui Rio - de Corpo Inteiro by Mário Jorge de Carvalho was published. A year later, in 2015, the book Rui Rio - Raizes de Aço, authored by Carlos Mota Cardoso was published.

== Political career ==
Rio began his political career as part of the Juventude Social-Democrata (JSD), the Social Democrats' youth organization. He was Vice President of its National Political Commission from 1982 to 1984. At the same time he was a member of the National Political Commission of the Social Democratic Party, under Pinto Balsemão and later Mota Pinto. He was also deputy to the Assembly of the Republic, elected for Porto, between 1991 and 2002. From 2002 to 2005, he was vice-president, under leaders Durão Barroso and, subsequently, Pedro Santana Lopes. Repeating the position, between 2008 and 2010, with Manuela Ferreira Leite. Between 1996 and 1998, he was Vice President of the Instituto Sá Carneiro. From 2003 to 2005 he was President of the Eixo Atlântico do Noroeste Peninsular.

=== Mayor of Porto ===
In 2001, Rio was elected president of the City Hall of Porto. After 2001, Rio was reelected Mayor of Porto, with absolute majority in 2005, against Francisco Assis, and in 2009, against Elisa Ferreira. His term ended on 22 October 2013, when the new mayor Rui Moreira took office.

=== Leader of the PSD ===
In 2018, Rio won the race to become leader of the PSD after campaigning to hold the party on a centrist line. On the leadership election held on 13 January 2018, Rio defeated his more conservative rival, former Prime Minister Pedro Santana Lopes, winning 54 percent of votes from PSD party members.

Ending the animosity that followed the 2015 legislative election and nudging the PSD closer to the center, Rio and Prime Minister António Costa signed an agreement in April 2018 which covered cooperation on a reform intended to give more powers to municipalities, as well as on a 12-year strategy to keep using European Union structural funds for development. Under his leadership, the PSD also backed the Socialists in areas such as labor law reform and defense.

Amid criticism at his leadership, Rio won a confidence motion by 75 to 50 votes in the party's National Council in early 2019, only after a 10-hour debate. In January 2020, Rio fended off another leadership challenge on a promise to keep the leading opposition force on a centrist course. In the party's 2020 leadership election, he scored 53 percent in a runoff vote against the party's former parliamentary spokesman Luís Montenegro, who demanded a more aggressive opposition to António Costa's Socialist Party following the Social Democrats' worst result in over 30 years in the parliamentary elections the previous October.

On 27 November 2021, he was re-elected President of the PSD for the third time, winning 18,852 votes, against Paulo Rangel, who collected 17,106 votes. He took office on 17 December 2021, at the 39th National Congress of the Party, which took place in Santa Maria da Feira, under the motto "New Horizons for Portugal".

In the 2022 Portuguese legislative election, the Social Democrats lost 2 seats, taking them to 77 seats in the Assembly. In the aftermath of the election, Rio announced he would call early internal elections on which he would not run again for party leader.

On 28 May 2022, the day Luís Montenegro was elected leader of the Social Democratic Party, Rui Rio announced his departure from active politics.

On 12 September 2022, Rui Rio resigned his Assembly of the Republic seat, which became effective two days later.

== Political positions ==
Rio was a critic of austerity and has sought to distance himself from the remedies adopted by Pedro Passos Coelho and the European troika in response to the eurozone economic crisis and the Economic Adjustment Programme for Portugal. On social issues, as a centrist, he is to the left of his party as a supporter of abortion rights, euthanasia and legalizing cannabis for medicinal purposes.

=== Criticism of Freemasonry ===
Following his party's internal elections, which he disputed against Luís Montenegro and Miguel Pinto Luz, Rio stated that Freemasonry "is everywhere" and trying to "condition Portuguese society" by giving this organization obscure and untransparent motivations. Rio's statements were a response to Paulo Mota Pinto, who referred to Rio for further clarification on the alleged "dark interests" who want to dominate the party. Rio made statements in January 2019 regarding Montenegro's Freemansonry ties.

Rio admitted to perceiving Paulo Mota Pinto's reference and replied: "When I am talking about secret, obscure, little transparent interests, I am referring clearly to Freemasonry." He further went on saying that he "senses" that the Freemasons "are everywhere and trying to condition many things", and that he has "no doubt about that". Rio clarified that if he denied such influences he would be a "hypocrite" and that he is the only one with enough courage to criticize the Freemasons' influence.

== Personal life ==
Rui Rio is married with Lídia Azevedo. The couple has a daughter, Marta.

Rui Rio is a supporter of Boavista F.C. He enjoys playing drums and is a fan of American blues guitarist B. B. King. Rio is also enthusiastic about old cars and promoted old car races as mayor of Porto, resurrecting the Boavista Circuit. He also salvaged a 1969 Mercedes 280S which had been long stored in a municipal garage; this vehicle was restored and regularly used by Rio as official car during his term as mayor. He personally owns a 1970 Simca 1000 and has been seen driving it publicly several times.

== Honours ==
- Grand-Cross of the Order of Prince Henry, Portugal (1 March 2006)
- Grand-Cross of the Order of Merit of the Republic of Hungary, Hungary (10 December 2003)
- First Class of the Order of the White Star, Estonia (20 February 2006)
- Grand-Cross of the Royal Norwegian Order of Merit, Norway (25 September 2009)
- Grand-Cross of the Order of St. Gregory the Great, Holy See (3 September 2010)
- Commander of the Order of Merit of the Republic of Poland, Poland (16 July 2012)

== Electoral history ==
=== Porto City Council election, 2001 ===
Ballot: 16 December 2001
Party	Candidate	Votes	%	Seats	+/−
PSD/CDS–PP	Rui Rio	50,741	42.8	6	+2
PS	Fernando Gomes	45,663	38.5	6	–2
CDU	Rui Sá	12,438	10.5	1	±0
BE	João Teixeira Lopes	3,038	2.6	0	new
Other parties		1,533	1.3	0	±0
Blank/Invalid ballots		5,248	4.4	–	–
Turnout		118,614	48.26	13	±0
Source: Autárquicas 2001

=== Porto City Council election, 2005 ===
Ballot: 9 October 2005
Party	Candidate	Votes	%	Seats	+/−
PSD/CDS–PP	Rui Rio	63,443	46.2	7	+1
PS	Francisco Assis	49,653	36.1	5	–1
CDU	Rui Sá	12,311	9.0	1	±0
BE	João Teixeira Lopes	5,797	4.2	0	±0
Other parties		1,756	1.3	0	±0
Blank/Invalid ballots		4,420	3.2	–	–
Turnout		137,380	58.43	13	±0
Source: Autárquicas 2005

=== Porto City Council election, 2009 ===
Ballot: 11 October 2009
Party	Candidate	Votes	%	Seats	+/−
PSD/CDS–PP	Rui Rio	62,507	47.5	7	±0
PS	Elisa Ferreira	45,682	34.7	5	±0
CDU	Rui Sá	12,904	9.8	1	±0
BE	João Teixeira Lopes	6,552	4.9	0	±0
PCTP/MRPP	João Valente Pinto	915	0.7	0	±0
Blank/Invalid ballots		3,089	2.4	–	–
Turnout		131,649	56.75	13	±0
Source: Autárquicas 2009

=== PSD leadership election, 2018 ===
Ballot: 13 January 2018
Candidate	Votes	%
Rui Rio	22,728	54.2
Pedro Santana Lopes	19,244	45.8
Blank/Invalid ballots	683	–
Turnout	42,655	60.34
Source: Resultados

=== Legislative election, 2019 ===
Ballot: 6 October 2019
Party	Candidate	Votes	%	Seats	+/−
PS	António Costa	1,903,687	36.3	108	+22
PSD	Rui Rio	1,454,283	27.8	79	–10
BE	Catarina Martins	498,549	9.5	19	±0
CDU	Jerónimo de Sousa	332,018	6.3	12	–5
CDS–PP	Assunção Cristas	221,094	4.2	5	–13
PAN	André Silva	173,931	3.3	4	+3
Chega	André Ventura	67,502	1.3	1	new
IL	Carlos Guimarães Pinto	67,443	1.3	1	new
Livre	Joacine Katar Moreira	56,940	1.1	1	+1
Other parties		207,162	4.0	0	±0
Blank/Invalid ballots		254,875	4.9	–	–
Turnout		5,237,484	48.60	230	±0
Source: Comissão Nacional de Eleições

=== PSD leadership election, 2020 ===
Ballot: 11 and 18 January 2020
Candidate	1st round		2nd round	
Candidate	Votes	%	Votes	%
Rui Rio	15,546	49.0	17,157	53.2
Luís Montenegro	13,137	41.4	15,086	46.8
Miguel Pinto Luz	3,030	9.6		
Blank/Invalid ballots	369	–	341	–
Turnout	32,082	79.01	32,582	80.20
Source: Resultados

=== PSD leadership election, 2021 ===
Ballot: 27 November 2021
Candidate	Votes	%
Rui Rio	18,852	52.4
Paulo Rangel	17,106	47.6
Blank/Invalid ballots	518	–
Turnout	36,476	78.17
Source: Resultados

=== Legislative election, 2022 ===
Ballot: 30 January 2022
Party	Candidate	Votes	%	Seats	+/−
PS	António Costa	2,302,601	41.4	120	+12
PSD (Note: Sum of the votes of the Social Democratic Party (PSD) in mainland Portugal and the PSD.CDS – People's Party (CDS–PP) coalitions in Azores and Madeira. The 5 MPs elected in these coalitions are all from the PSD.)	Rui Rio	1,618,381	29.1	77	–2
Chega	André Ventura	399,659	7.2	12	+11
IL	João Cotrim Figueiredo	273,687	4.9	8	+7
BE	Catarina Martins	244,603	4.4	5	–14
CDU	Jerónimo de Sousa	238,920	4.3	6	–6
CDS–PP	Rodrigues dos Santos	89,181	1.6	0	–5
PAN	Inês Sousa Real	88,152	1.6	1	–3
Livre	Rui Tavares	71,232	1.3	1	±0
Other parties		91,299	1.6	0	±0
Blank/Invalid ballots		146,824	2.6	–	–
Turnout		5,564,539	51.46	230	±0
Source: Comissão Nacional de Eleições

== See also ==
- Porto history and timeline
