= Elisa Ferreira =

Portuguese politician (born 1955)

Elisa Ferreira GCC
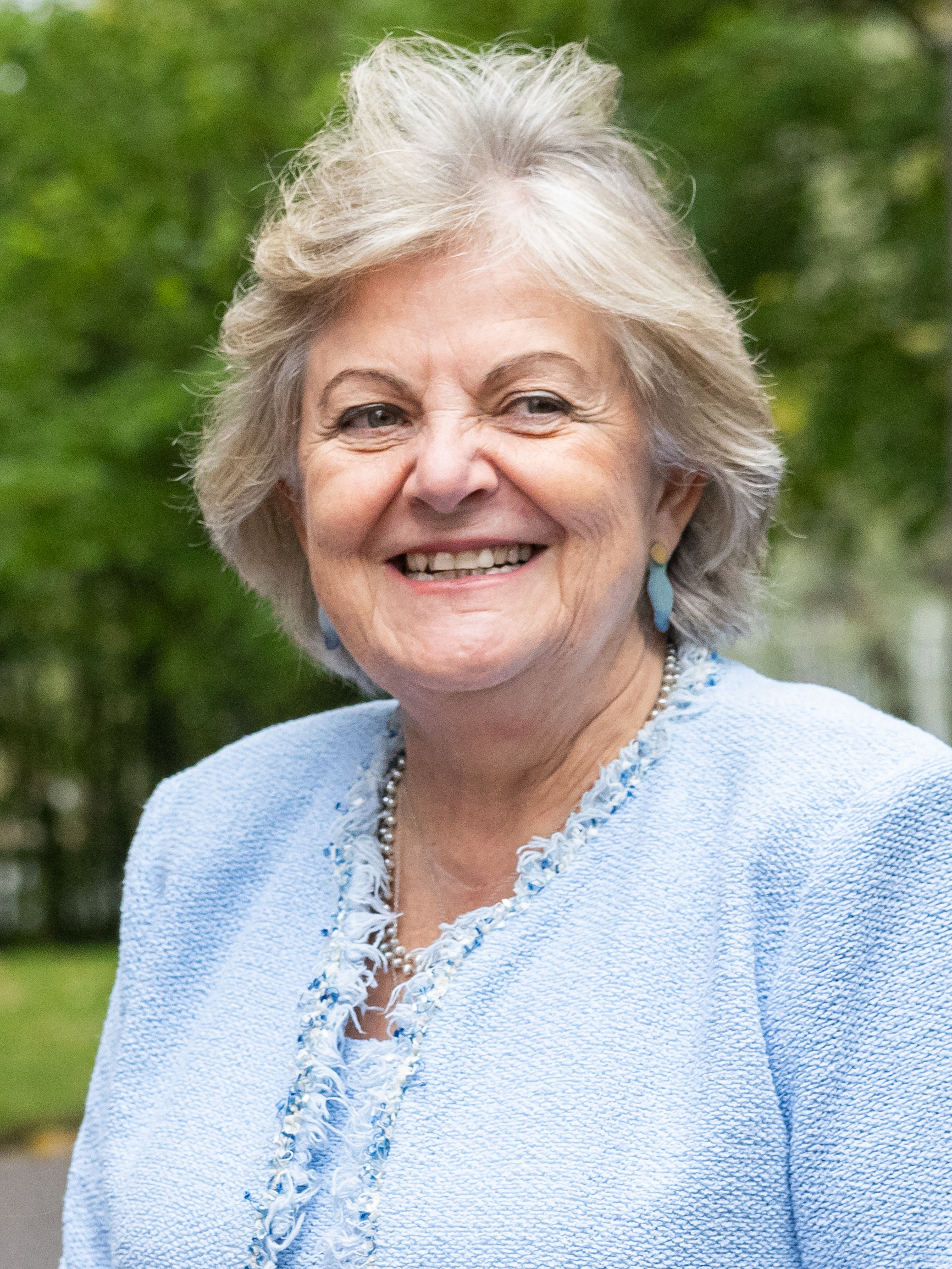
- Ferreira in 2023

European Commissioner for Cohesion and Reforms
- In office 1 December 2019 – 30 November 2024
- Commission: Von der Leyen I
- Preceded by: Corina Crețu (as Commissioner for Regional Policy)
- Succeeded by: Raffaele Fitto

Member of the European Parliament for Portugal
- In office 1 July 2004 – 19 June 2016
- Succeeded by: Manuel António dos Santos

Minister of Planning
- In office 25 October 1999 – 6 April 2002
- Prime Minister: António Guterres
- Preceded by: João Cravinho
- Succeeded by: Pedro Marques

Minister of the Environment
- In office 28 October 1995 – 25 October 1999
- Prime Minister: António Guterres
- Preceded by: Teresa Patrício Gouveia
- Succeeded by: José Sócrates

Member of the Assembly of the Republic
- In office 4 April 2002 – 30 June 2004
- Constituency: Braga

Personal details
- Born: Elisa Maria da Costa Guimarães Ferreira; 17 October 1955 (age 70) Porto, Portugal
- Party: Socialist
- Other political affiliations: Progressive Alliance of Socialists and Democrats; Party of European Socialists
- Education: University of Porto

Elisa Maria da Costa Guimarães Ferreira, GCC (born 17 October 1955) is a Portuguese politician and economist who served as the European Commissioner for Cohesion and Reforms in the administration of President Ursula von der Leyen between 2019 and 2024. She previously served as vice-governor of the Bank of Portugal from 2016 until 2019. She was as Member of the European Parliament (MEP) for the Socialist Party; part of the Party of European Socialists between 2004 and 2016. In 2019, she was selected by Portugal to serve as a European Commissioner. Previously, she was in charge of the Ministries of Environment (1995-1999) and Public Works (1999-2001) during the governments of António Guterres.

== Political career ==
=== Member of the Portuguese Government, 1995–2002 ===
Ferreira served as Minister of Environment (1995–1999) and as Minister for Planning (1999–2001) in the government of António Guterres.

=== Member of the European Parliament, 2004–2016 ===
Ferreira was a Member of the European Parliament from the 2004 European election until her resignation in 2016. Throughout her time in parliament, she served as a member of the Committee on Economic and Monetary Affairs. In this capacity, she drafted the committee's own-initiative report on closer coordination of economic policies, which calls for the European Central Bank (ECB) to be granted powers to monitor “financial stability in the euro-area” and to be involved “in EU-wide macroprudential supervision of systematically important financial institutions.” She was also in charge of the parliament's report on the Macroeconomic Imbalance Procedure in 2011 and led the parliament's work on the Single Resolution Mechanism (SRM) in 2013.

From 2004 to 2014, Ferreira was a member of the parliament's delegation to the ACP–EU Joint Parliamentary Assembly. In 2015, she joined the Special Committee on Tax Rulings and Other Measures Similar in Nature or Effect.

In 2012, Ferreira was part of the Socialists and Democrats (S&D) expert “alternative troika” sent to Greece to assess what measures can be taken to spur job growth.

In addition to her committee assignments, Ferreira was a member of the European Parliament Intergroup on Long Term Investment and Reindustrialisation. She also represented the Parliament at the 2007 United Nations Climate Change Conference in Bali and the 2008 United Nations Climate Change Conference in Poznań.

=== Banco de Portugal, 2016–2019 ===
In June 2016, Elisa Ferreira resigned from the European Parliament after she was nominated by the Portuguese Government to join the board of directors of the Bank of Portugal. She was replaced by Manuel dos Santos.

=== European Commissioner, 2019–2024 ===
On 27 August 2019 Prime-Minister António Costa announced that Ferreira had been proposed as the Portuguese commissioner in Ursula von der Leyen's European Commission, to take office on 1 November 2019, taking the portfolio of Cohesion and Reforms. She became the first Portuguese woman to be put forward as commissioner.

== Life after politics ==
After leaving the European Commission, Ferreira resumed her former occupation as university teacher at the Faculty of Economics of the University of Porto.

== Electoral history ==
=== Porto City Council election, 2009 ===
Ballot: 11 October 2009
Party	Candidate	Votes	%	Seats	+/−
PSD/CDS–PP	Rui Rio	62,507	47.5	7	±0
PS	Elisa Ferreira	45,682	34.7	5	±0
CDU	Rui Sá	12,904	9.8	1	±0
BE	João Teixeira Lopes	6,552	4.9	0	±0
PCTP/MRPP	João Valente Pinto	915	0.7	0	±0
Blank/Invalid ballots		3,089	2.4	–	–
Turnout		131,649	56.75	13	±0
Source: Autárquicas 2009

== Other activities ==
- Fundação Futebol Clube do Porto, Member of the Council (since 2026)
- Instituto Nacional de Estatística (INE), Member of the Administrative Board (1989–1992)
- Associação Industrial Portuense, Executive Vice-President (1992–1994)
- Comissão de Coordenação da Região Norte, Vice-President (1988–1992)

Political offices
Preceded by Carlos Moedas	Portuguese European Commissioner; 2019	Incumbent
