= United Nations Office for Project Services =

Operational arm of the United Nations

United Nations Office for Project Services (Note: Other languages: مكتب الأمم المتحدة لخدمات المشاريع (in Arabic); 联合国项目事务署 (in Chinese); Bureau des Nations Unies pour les services d'appui aux projets (in French); Управление Организации Объединенных Наций по обслуживанию проектов (in Russian); Oficina de las Naciones Unidas de Servicios para Proyectos (in Spanish))
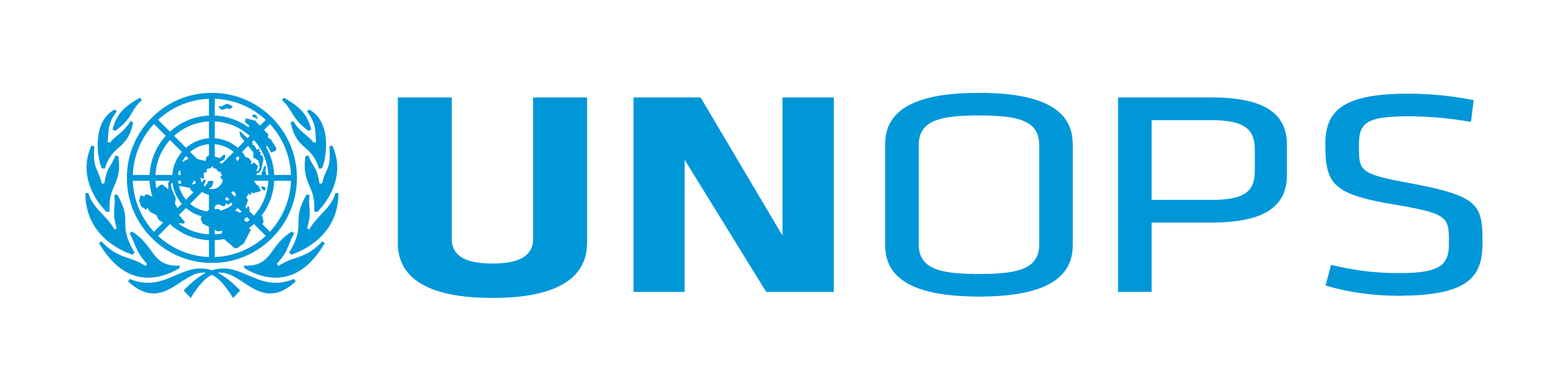
- Abbreviation: UNOPS
- Formation: December 1973 (as an office of United Nations Development Programme); January 1995 (as an independent agency)
- Type: Independent self-financing member of the United Nations family
- Legal status: Active
- Headquarters: UN City, Copenhagen, Denmark
- Executive Director: Jorge Moreira da Silva
- Parent organization: United Nations System
- Website: http://www.unops.org

The United Nations Office for Project Services (UNOPS) is a United Nations agency dedicated to implementing humanitarian and development projects for the United Nations System, international financial institutions, governments and other partners around the world, with a focus on infrastructure, procurement and project management. The organization's global headquarters is located at the UN City campus in Copenhagen, Denmark. UNOPS delivers around $3 billion worth of development projects for its partners every year. Its activities have ranged from managing the construction of schools in Afghanistan, to building shelters in Haiti, to procuring ambulances to support the Ebola response in Liberia.

UNOPS is a member of the United Nations System Chief Executives Board and Senior Management Group, the Environment Management Group (EMG), the United Nations Sustainable Development Group and works closely with UN partners, governments, international financial institutions and multilateral development banks, such as: the World Bank, the Global Fund to Fight AIDS, Tuberculosis and Malaria, United Nations Department of Peace Operations, Government of Argentina, the Office of the United Nations High Commissioner for Refugees (UNHCR), the European Union, and the government of the United States.

== History and mission ==
UNOPS was established in 1973 as part of the UNDP. It became an independent, self-financing organization in 1995. UNOPS concentrates its support in the areas of infrastructure, procurement, project management, human resources and financial management services. UNOPS often works in post-disaster and peace and security settings, developing countries and economies in transition. In December 2010, the United Nations General Assembly reaffirmed the mandate of UNOPS "as a central resource for the UN system in procurement and contracts management as well as in civil works and physical infrastructure development, including the related capacity development activities". Examples of such works include building roads, schools, and health clinics; removing landmines; and providing expertise for holding elections.

A new headquarters of UNOPS opened in Copenhagen in May 2009.

Today, UNOPS delivers around $3 billion worth of projects each year in more than 130 nations across the world.

== Financing ==
UNOPS is self-financing. It covers its costs by charging a fee on each project supported. UNOPS is not-for-profit.

== Services ==
UNOPS offers implementation, advisory and transactional services in its five core areas of expertise:

- Infrastructure
- Procurement
- Project Management
- Financial Management
- Human Resources

UNOPS provides specialized services to a range of partners, including: the United Nations, its agencies, funds and programmes; international financial institutions; governments; intergovernmental organizations; non-governmental organizations; foundations; and the private sector.

In 2023, UNOPS created more than 23 million days of paid work for beneficiaries. The organization supported its partners with the construction, design and/or rehabilitation of more than 187 kilometers of roads, 55 schools, and 7 hospitals and 49 health clinics, among others. UNOPS also procured and/or distributed more than US$1.6 billion worth of goods and services for its partners.

UNOPS is the legal and administrative host for several organizations. The following entities are currently under hosting agreements by UNOPS, grouped by theme:

- Health: RBM Partnership to End Malaria, Stop TB Partnership, ATscale Global Partnership
- Nutrition: Scaling Up Nutrition (SUN) Movement
- Water and sanitation: Sanitation and Hygiene Fund (established 2020); and previously Water Supply and Sanitation Collaborative Council – now defunct)
- Sustainable urban development: Cities Alliance
- Disaster displacement: Platform on Disaster Displacement

In addition, UNOPS also managers several multi-stakeholder partnerships and initiatives, including:

- Initiative for Climate Action Transparency
- South East Asia Energy Transition Partnership
- Santiago Network Secretariat (together with United Nations Office for Disaster Risk Reduction)

UNOPS was involved in the response to the COVID-19 pandemic.

In 2023 during COP28, UNOPS and the UN Office for Disaster Risk Reduction, were selected to co-host the secretariat for the Santiago Network for Loss and Damage. The Santiago Network, established to address climate change impacts in developing countries, acts as a crucial connector between technical assistance and the Loss & Damage Fund, enhancing the capacity of these countries to manage climate-related losses and damages.

In 2024, the Secretary-General appointed UNOPS to operationalise the newly created Office of Senior Humanitarian and Reconstruction Coordinator for Gaza. Led by Sigrid Kaag, the office was created in response to the Gaza war in an effort to accelerate humanitarian relief consignments to Gaza through States which are not party to the conflict.

== Governance ==
In 2008, UNOPS adopted a governance structure in line with General Assembly resolutions. Since then, the executive director reports directly to the UN Secretary-General and the Executive Board, and has the authority to apply United Nations staff rules and regulations to UNOPS staff. Since 2009 the executive director has been able to sign host country agreements with governments.

UNOPS is accountable to member states of the United Nations through its Executive Board, which it shares with the UNDP and the United Nations Population Fund (UNFPA).

UNOPS is also accountable to the UN Board of Auditors who audit UNOPS on an annual basis.

== Transparency ==
In September 2011, UNOPS joined the International Aid Transparency Initiative (IATI), becoming the first UN body to publish operational data in the IATI format in October of the same year. IATI seeks to make information on aid spending easier to access, understand, and use. UNOPS, along with other prominent organizations such as the Gates Foundation, the World Bank, and the European Commission, contributes to this initiative by providing detailed, machine-readable data on their projects.

Project-level information, including financial transactions, is published monthly to the IATI Registry by UNOPS. UNOPS also maintains an online platform, data.unops.org, which enhances the transparency of UNOPS operations.

== Certifications ==
UNOPS attained a ISO 9001 quality management system certification in June 2011.

UNOPS gained an ISO 14001 certification for its commitment to protecting the environment in 2013.

UNOPS reports according to the Global Reporting Initiative (GRI) sustainability standards.

== Infrastructure ==
=== UNOPS partnership with the University of Oxford and UN Environment Programme ===
UNOPS has worked with the University of Oxford and UN Environment Programme in a number of collaborations that focus on enhancing the sustainability of infrastructure. This includes the report Infrastructure for Climate Action. The report highlights the substantial role of infrastructure in generating greenhouse gas emissions and adaptation costs, accounting for 79% and 88% respectively.

The report advocates for fundamental shifts in the planning, delivery, and management of infrastructure to align with critical climate and development targets. It emphasizes the integration of nature-based solutions, which can tackle a broad spectrum of sustainable development challenges while mitigating the impacts of climate change, biodiversity loss, and pollution.

== Procurement ==
In 2015, 2016, 2017, and 2018 UNOPS achieved gold level in sustainable procurement from the Chartered Institute of Purchasing and Supply.

In 2022, the UNOPS was presented with the annual Sustainable Procurement and Supply Award by the UN High-Level Committee on Management's Procurement Network. This recognition highlights UNOPS' commitment to sustainable procurement practices that support social and economic development while protecting the environment.

== Investigations (2023-present) by law enforcement agencies ==
In 2014, Secretary-General Ban Ki-Moon appointed Grete Faremo as head of UNOPS. Her appointment led to a change in direction for the organization. Between 2014 and 2021 its portfolio of projects expanded from $1.14 billion to more than $3.4 billion. She bragged about how she immediately saw to it that "more than 1,200 pages of rules went into the trash" and that she would "rewrite (its) operational principles" in the name of running UNOPS more like a fast and agile business. Under her tenure, UNOPS shed its former reputation as an invisible go-between meant to ease contracting. UNOPS found itself with a surplus of funds it could use for itself. However, Faremo was accused of managing the money incompetently at best, and corruptly at worst. As part of an initiative called the "Sustainable Investments in Infrastructure and Innovation", or S3i for short, millions of US dollars' worth of donor money was given to contractors that had repeatedly failed to work on the projects they were given. The UN is expected to have to write down over $25 million in bad loans.

Faremo's deputy Vitaly Vanshelboim was placed on executive leave, as the United Nations Office of Internal Oversight Services investigated the allegations and audited the matter. Vanshelboim was later sacked in early 2023. Faremo resigned in early May 2022 after an investigation by The New York Times drew attention to the problems under Faremo's tenure. International development news publication, Devex and blogger, Mukesh Kapila, also wrote a series of articles on the matter. In 2025, Vitaly-Vanshelboi, the former Deputy, was remanded in Spain for "alleged bribery, money laundering and electronic fraud". As of 2025, he is central in a corruption investigation, that is being done by the FBI.

== List of executive directors ==
| No. | Executive Director | Assumed office | Left office | Country of origin |
|---|---|---|---|---|
| 1 | Reinhart Helmke | January 1995 | January 2003 | Germany |
| Interim | Gerald Walzer | February 2003 | August 2003 | Austria |
| 2 | Nigel Fisher | August 2003 | October 2005 | United Kingdom |
| Interim | Gilberto Flores | 14 November 2005 | 11 June 2006 | Chile |
| 3 | Jan Mattsson | 12 June 2006 | 10 June 2014 | Sweden |
| 4 | Grete Faremo | 01 August 2014 | 8 May 2022 | Norway |
| Interim | Jens Wandel | 9 May 2022 | 13 April 2023 | Denmark |
| 5 | Jorge Moreira da Silva | 14 April 2023 | incumbent | Portugal |

Jens Wandel was appointed acting executive director of UNOPS by the Secretary-General on 9 May 2022. Wandel had served the UN in many different capacities over a long career, most recently as the Secretary-General's designate for the COVID-19 Response and Recovery Fund. Previously, he served as special adviser to the Secretary-General on UN Reforms and before that he was Director of UNDP's Bureau for Management Services. He was tasked with correcting the failures surrounding UNOPS S3i initiative and reforming the organisation. His plans to realign UNOPS were accepted by the executive board in June 2022.

In April 2023, Jorge Moreira da Silva was appointed executive director on an initial two-year term.
