= João Pedro Matos Fernandes =

Portuguese politician (born 1967)

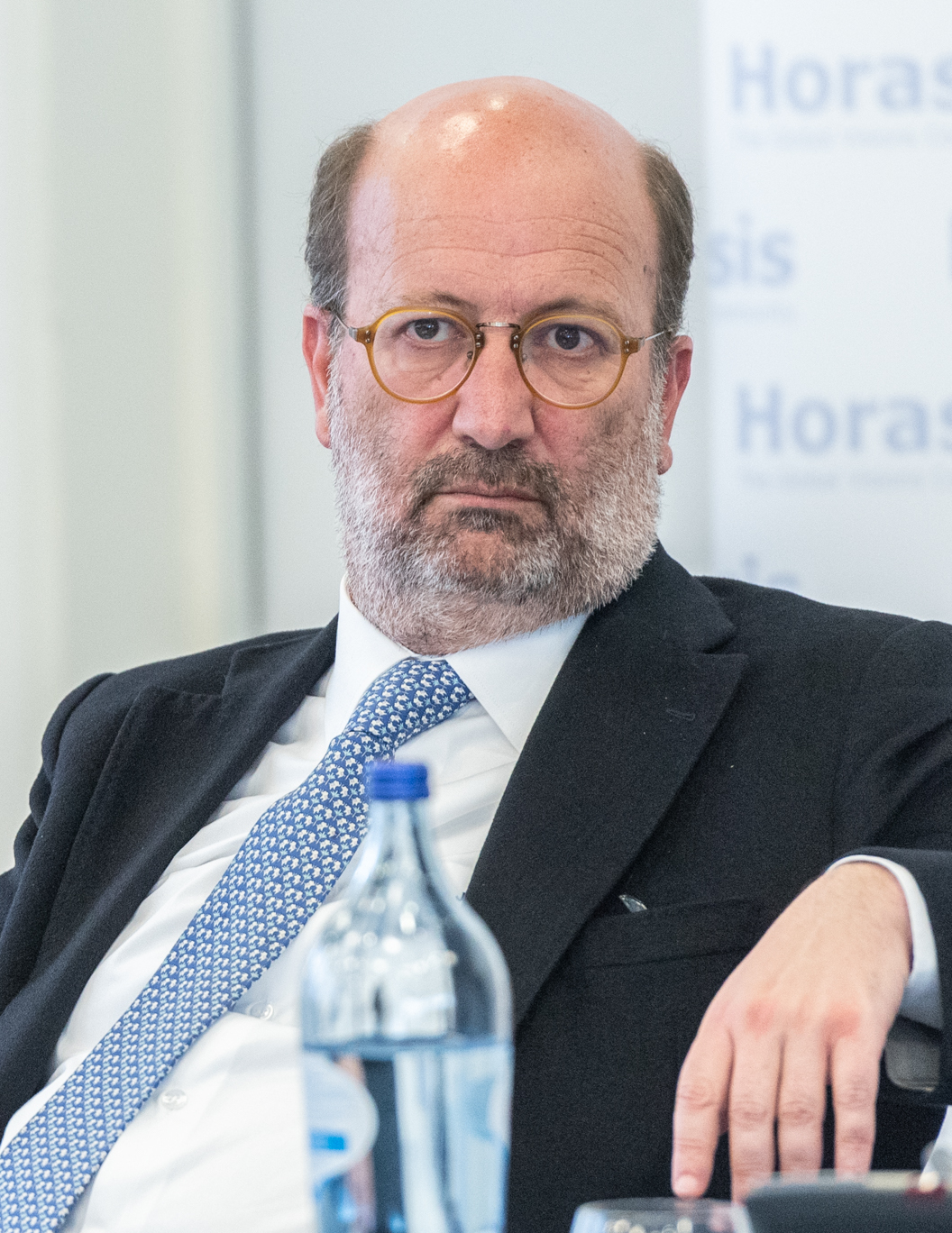
- Matos Fernandes in 2019

Minister of the Environment
- In office 26 November 2015 – 30 March 2022
- Prime Minister: António Costa
- Preceded by: Jorge Moreira da Silva
- Succeeded by: Duarte Cordeiro

Personal details
- Born: 1967 (age 58–59) Águeda, Portugal
- Education: University of Porto; Instituto Superior Técnico

João Pedro Matos Fernandes (born 1967) is a Portuguese politician who served as Minister of the Environment since 26 November 2015 until 30 March 2022.

== Early life and education ==
Matos Fernandes has a bachelor's degree in civil engineering from the University of Porto and a master's degree in transport from Instituto Superior Técnico.

== Early career ==
Before entering politics, Matos Fernandes served as president of the Portuguese Port Authorities' Association from 2008 to 2010, and as chairman of the Viana do Castelo Port Authority from 2009 to 2012.

== Political career ==
When Portugal held the rotating presidency of the Council of the European Union in 2021, Matos Fernandes chaired the meetings of its Environment Council.

During his time in office, Matos Fernandes later oversaw an auction in August 2020 of contracts to build and operate new solar energy capacity that set a world record for the lowest price of future output.

With Portugal facing a winter drought in early 2022, Matos Fernandes ordered some of the country's hydropower dams to temporarily limit water use for electricity production and irrigation, prioritizing human consumption instead, and to ensure a supply of drinking water for at least two years.

== Personal life ==
Matos Fernandes is a cousin of Narcos actor Pêpê Rapazote.
