= Miguel Pinto Luz =

Portuguese politician (born 1977)

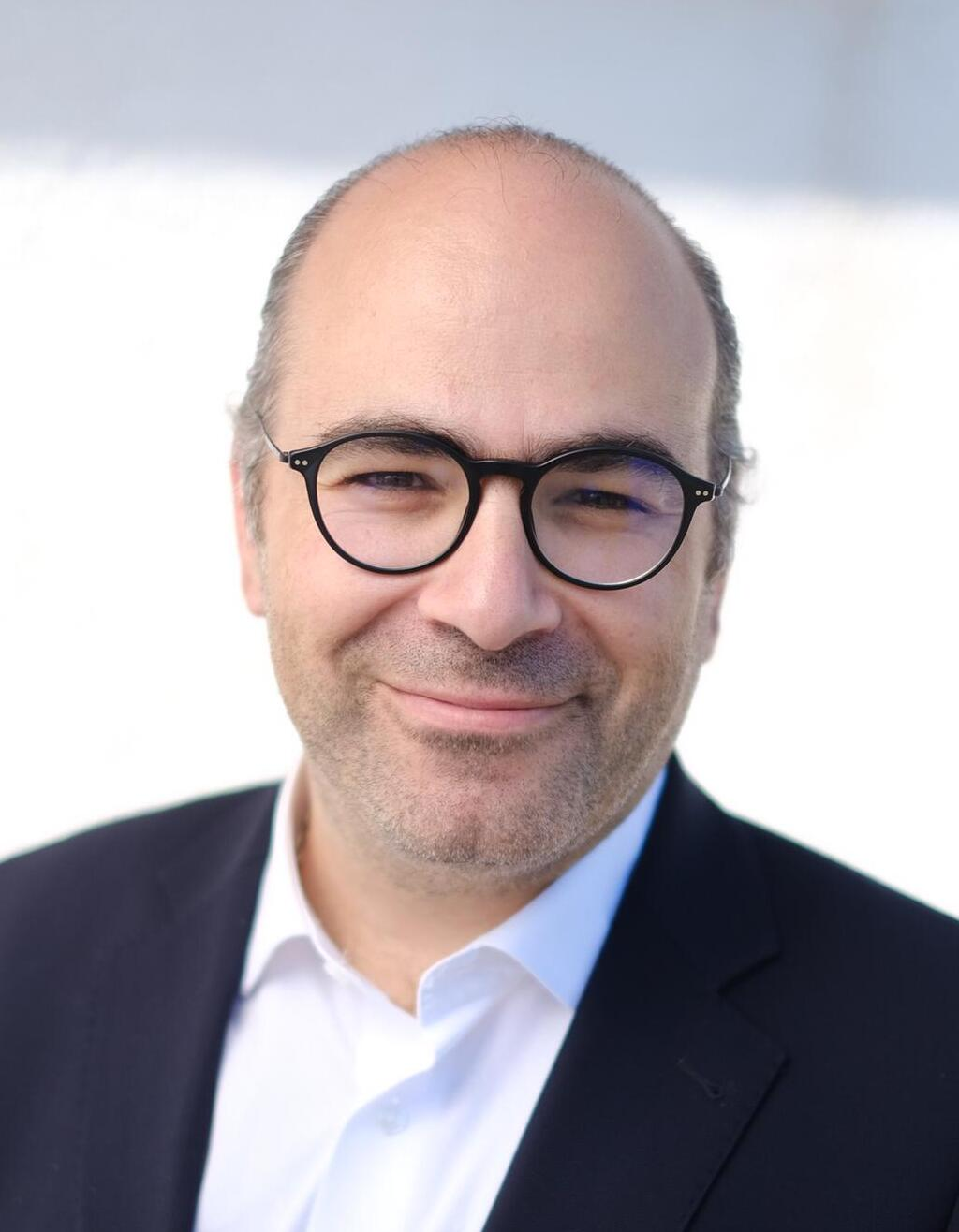
- Pinto Luz in 2019

Minister of Infrastructure and Housing
- Incumbent
- Assumed office 2 April 2024
- Prime Minister: Luís Montenegro
- Preceded by: António Costa (Infrastructure; caretaker); Marina Gonçalves (Housing)

Member of the Assembly of the Republic
- In office 26 March 2024 – 2 April 2024
- Constituency: Faro

Vice President of the Social Democratic Party
- In office 3 July 2022 – 19 October 2024
- President: Luís Montenegro
- Preceded by: Isaura Morais
- Succeeded by: Rui Rocha

Secretary of State for Infrastructure, Transport and Communications
- In office 30 October 2015 – 26 November 2015
- Prime Minister: Pedro Passos Coelho
- Minister: Miguel Morais Leitão

Member of the Cascais City Council
- In office 9 October 2005 – 25 January 2024

Personal details
- Born: Miguel Martinez de Castro Pinto Luz; 8 March 1977 (age 49) Lisbon, Portugal
- Party: Social Democratic Party
- Children: 3
- Education: Instituto Superior Técnico
- Occupation: Electrical engineer • Politician

Miguel Martinez de Castro Pinto Luz (born 8 March 1977) is a Portuguese politician who is currently serving as Minister of Infrastructure and Housing since 2024, in the XXIV and XXV Constitutional Governments, led by Luís Montenegro.

== Political career ==
Pinto Luz has also served as Secretary of State for Infrastructure, Transportation and Communications during the 20th Constitutional Government and as Deputy Mayor of Cascais from 2017 to 2024.

Pinto Luz was a candidate for the Social Democratic Party leadership in 2020 against Rui Rio and Luís Montenegro, coming third with less than 10% of the votes and failing to go to a runoff. During the campaign, he supported an alliance with Chega in case the PSD needed them to form a government.

After the 2022 leadership election, Pinto Luz became one of the Vice presidents of Luís Montenegro. He was chosen as the main candidate from Faro in the 2024 legislative election, a decision that was widely criticized by all the municipal party leaderships.
