= Ministry of the Environment (Portugal) =

Government ministry of Portugal

Ministry of the Environment and Energy
- Ministério do Ambiente e Energia

Ministry overview
- Jurisdiction: Government of Portugal
- Minister responsible: Graça Carvalho, Minister of the Environment and Energy

The Ministry of the Environment and Energy (Portuguese: Ministério do Ambiente e Energia) is a Portuguese government ministry. The Ministry was formed in 2013 by narrowing the scope of the Ministry of Agriculture.

The Portuguese Environment Agency (APA) is a public institute that operates within the scope of the Ministry and works on environmental policy.

== Name changes ==
From 2013 - 2018, the department was entitled Minister of the Environment, Territorial Planning and Energy, it was then renamed to the Ministry of Environment and Energy Transition. In 2023 the ministry was renamed from Ministry of Environment and Climate Action to the Ministry of Environment and Energy.

== Leadership ==
From its founding in 2013 until 2015, Jorge Moreira da Silva was the Minister of the Environment, Territorial Planning and Energy. João Pedro Matos Fernandes served as minister from 2015 to 2022. Duarte Cordeiro was minister from March 2022 to April 2024. Graça Carvalho was appointed minister in April 2024.

== Controversies ==
The Ministry of Environment was the site of raids during the probe into corruption on the part of then Prime Minister Antonio Costa. Costa's premiership stands accused of corruption and malfeasance regarding various deals for lithium mines, a hydrogen production plant, and a data center. President of the Board of Directors of the Portuguese Environment Agency (APA) Nuno Lacasta was one of the suspects on warrants related to the probe.

In 2024, Lisbon climate activists occupied the Ministry of Environment, attaching themselves to railings and blocking access to workers. Their demands included the cessation of fossil fuel use by 2030.

== List of Ministers ==
Colour key
(for political parties)
Socialist Party (PS)
Social Democratic Party (PSD)
CDS – People's Party (CDS–PP)
Independent (Ind.)

#	Portrait	Name	Took office	Left office	Party	Prime Minister
1		Manuel da Rocha (1913–1981)	15 May 1974	17 July 1974	Ind.	Adelino da Palma Carlos
2		José Augusto Fernandes (?–?)	17 July 1974	8 August 1975	Ind.	Vasco Gonçalves
3		Henrique Oliveira e Sá (1919–2020)	8 August 1975	19 September 1975	Ind.	Vasco Gonçalves
–	Vacant office		19 September 1975	5 January 1990		José Pinheiro de Azevedo
–	Vacant office		19 September 1975	5 January 1990		Mário Soares
–	Vacant office		19 September 1975	5 January 1990		Alfredo Nobre da Costa
–	Vacant office		19 September 1975	5 January 1990		Carlos Mota Pinto
–	Vacant office		19 September 1975	5 January 1990		Maria de Lourdes Pintasilgo
–	Vacant office		19 September 1975	5 January 1990		Francisco Sá Carneiro
–	Vacant office		19 September 1975	5 January 1990		Diogo Freitas do Amaral
–	Vacant office		19 September 1975	5 January 1990		Francisco Pinto Balsemão
–	Vacant office		19 September 1975	5 January 1990		Mário Soares
–	Vacant office		19 September 1975	5 January 1990		Aníbal Cavaco Silva
4		Fernando Real (1923–2006)	5 January 1990	24 April 1991	PSD	Aníbal Cavaco Silva
5		Carlos Borrego (b. 1948)	24 April 1991	11 June 1993	Ind.	Aníbal Cavaco Silva
6		Teresa Patrício de Gouveia (b. 1946)	11 June 1993	28 October 1995	PSD	Aníbal Cavaco Silva
7		Elisa Ferreira (b. 1955)	28 October 1995	25 October 1999	PS	António Guterres
8		José Sócrates (b. 1957)	25 October 1999	6 April 2002	PS	António Guterres
9		Isaltino Morais (b. 1949)	6 April 2002	5 April 2003	PSD	José Durão Barroso
10		Amílcar Theias (b. 1946)	5 April 2003	21 May 2004	PSD	José Durão Barroso
11		Arlindo Cunha (b. 1950)	21 May 2004	17 June 2004	PSD	José Durão Barroso
12		Luís Nobre Guedes (b. 1955)	17 June 2004	12 March 2005	CDS–PP	Pedro Santana Lopes
13		Francisco Nunes Correia (b. 1951)	12 March 2005	26 October 2009	PS	José Sócrates
14		Dulce Pássaro (b. 1953)	26 October 2009	21 June 2011	PS	José Sócrates
15		Assunção Cristas (b. 1974)	21 June 2011	24 June 2013	CDS–PP	Pedro Passos Coelho
16		Jorge Moreira da Silva (b. 1971)	24 June 2013	26 November 2015	PSD	Pedro Passos Coelho
17		João Pedro Matos Fernandes (b. 1967)	26 November 2015	30 March 2022	PS	António Costa
18		Duarte Cordeiro (b. 1979)	30 March 2022	2 April 2024	PS	António Costa
19		Maria da Graça Carvalho (b. 1955)	2 April 2024	present	PSD	Luís Montenegro
