= Jorge Moreira da Silva =

Portuguese politician (born 1971)

Jorge Moreira da Silva GOIH
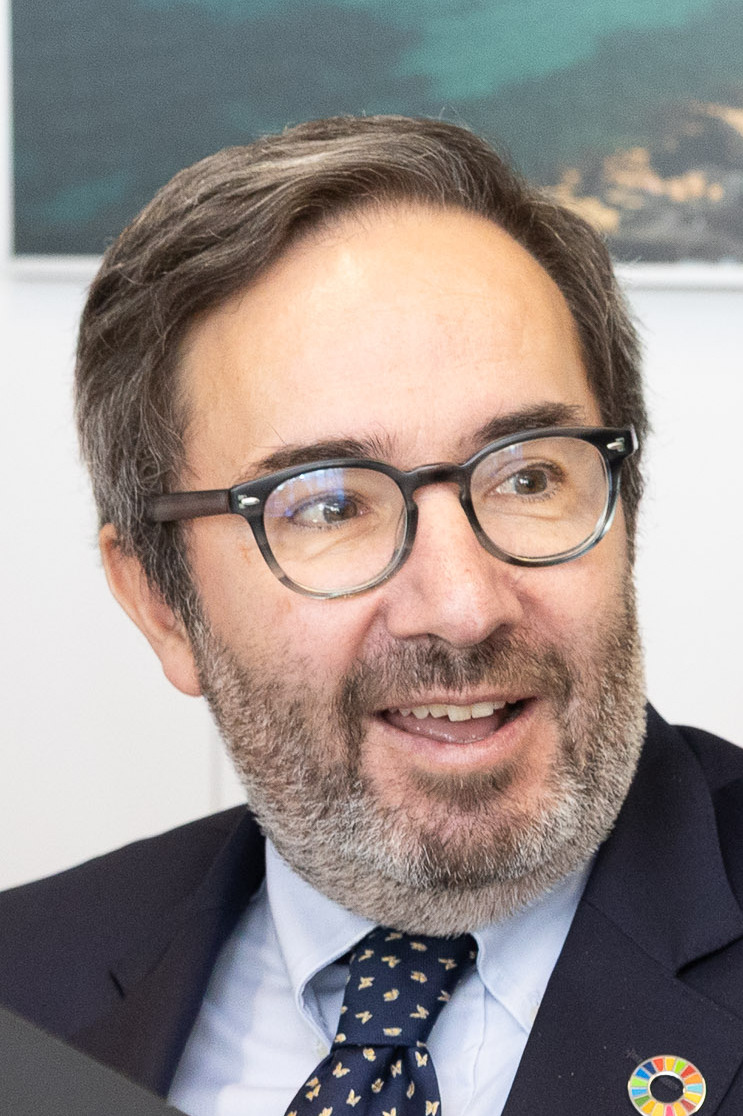
- Moreira da Silva in 2026

Executive Director of the United Nations Office for Project Services
- Incumbent
- Assumed office 17 April 2023
- Secretary-General: António Guterres
- Preceded by: Grete Faremo

Director of the Development Co-operation Directorate
- In office 1 November 2016 – 14 April 2022
- Secretary-General: José Ángel Gurría
- Preceded by: Jon Lomay
- Succeeded by: Pilar Garrido Gonzalo

Minister of the Environment, Territorial Planning and Energy
- In office 24 July 2013 – 26 November 2015
- Prime Minister: Pedro Passos Coelho
- Preceded by: Assunção Cristas
- Succeeded by: João Pedro Matos Fernandes

Secretary of State Assistant to the Minister of the Environment and Spatial Planning
- In office 21 July 2004 – 12 March 2005
- Prime Minister: Pedro Santana Lopes
- Minister: Luís Nobre Guedes

Secretary of State Assistant to the Minister of Science and Higher Education
- In office 6 October 2003 – 17 July 2004
- Prime Minister: José Manuel Barroso
- Preceded by: José Pinto Paixão
- Succeeded by: Pedro Sampaio Nunes

President of the Social Democratic Youth
- In office 17 December 1995 – 5 September 1998
- Preceded by: Pedro Passos Coelho
- Succeeded by: Pedro Duarte

Member of the Assembly of the Republic
- In office 23 October 2015 – 31 October 2016
- Constituency: Braga
- In office 10 March 2005 – 14 October 2009
- Constituency: Lisbon
- In office 27 October 1995 – 19 July 1999
- Constituency: Braga

Member of the European Parliament
- In office 20 July 1999 – 5 October 2003
- Constituency: Portugal

Personal details
- Born: Jorge Manuel Lopes Moreira da Silva; 24 April 1971 (age 55) Vila Nova de Famalicão, Portugal
- Party: Social Democratic Party
- Education: University of Porto; University of Navarra
- Occupation: Politician
- Profession: Engineer; Consultant

Jorge Manuel Lopes Moreira da Silva GOIH (born 24 April 1971) is a Portuguese engineer and politician of the Social Democratic Party serving as the executive director of the United Nations Office for Project Services, UNOPS, since 2023.

During his political career as an elected official, Moreira da Silva was member of the Portuguese Parliament and member of the European Parliament. Between 2003 and 2005 he was secretary of State for Science and Higher Education under Prime Minister José Manuel Durão Barroso and Secretary of State for the Environment and Territorial Planning under Prime Minister Pedro Santana Lopes. He went on to become minister of the Environment, Territorial Planning and Energy from 2013 to 2015 in the governments led by Pedro Passos Coelho. From 2016 to 2022 he was director of the Development Co-operation Directorate at OECD.

An international expert on development, climate change, carbon finance, energy, environment and humanitarian aid, Moreira da Silva has been a visiting professor on development, climate change, energy, environment, humanitarian aid, conflict and fragility and carbon markets at several Portuguese and international universities and institutions, namely Faculdade de Engenharia da Universidade do Porto, Instituto Superior de Ciências Sociais e Políticas and Sciences Po. He was member of the European Commission's High-Level Group on Research, Innovation, and Science Policy (RISE) and was also a member of the advisory committee of CIRCLE (Climate Impact Research Coordination for a Larger Europe). He served as senior advisor to the President of the Portuguese Republic, consultant to the European Commission and to the European Investment Bank and vice-president of GLOBE-Europe.

== Political career ==
=== Early beginnings ===
From 1995 to 1998, Moreira da Silva was the leader of Juventude Social Democrata, the youth organization of the PSD. He is also the founder (2011) and chairman of the Lisbon-based think-tank Plataforma para o Crescimento Sustentável - Platform for a Sustainable Growth.

=== Member of the European Parliament, 1999–2003 ===
As Member of the European Parliament, Moreira da Silva served on the Committee on the Environment, Public Health and Consumer Policy. In this capacity, he was the standing draftsman on climate change and he authored the Report and the political agreement on the EU GHG Emissions Trading Directive in 2003, the world's largest carbon market.

=== Secretary of State on Science and Higher Education, 2003–2004 ===
Moreira da Silva was Secretary of State on Science and Higher Education, at the XV Government led by Prime Minister José Manuel Durão Barroso

=== Secretary of State on Environment and Spatial Planning, 2004–2005 ===
Moreira da Silva was Secretary of State on Environment and Spatial Planning, at the XVI Government led by Prime Minister Pedro Santana Lopes.

=== Career within the PSD ===
In April 2010, Moreira da Silva worked as elected vice-president of the national board of the Social Democratic Party and between 2012 and 2016 he was the First Vice-President and Standing Coordinator of the Social Democratic Party, chaired by Pedro Passos Coelho.

=== Minister on Environment, Spatial Planning and Energy, 2013–2015 ===
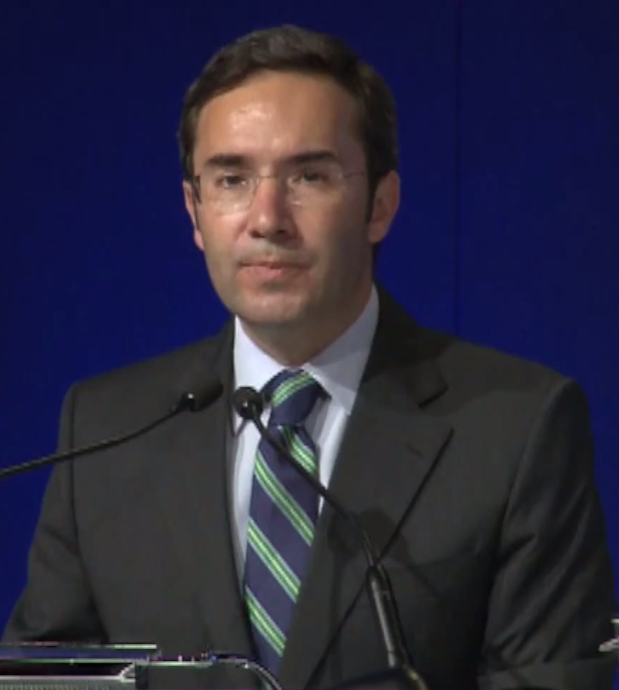
Jorge Moreira da Silva in the World Water Congress, in September 2014

As Minister on Environment, Spatial Planning and Energy, from 2013 to 2015, Moreira da Silva was responsible for energy, water, waste, spatial planning and housing sector structural reforms in Portugal.

Under his leadership, Portugal adopted a comprehensive Green Taxation Reform and the Portuguese Green Growth Commitment. Also during his tenure, the Portuguese government named SUMA, a consortium led by the country's Mota-Engil construction company, as the winning bidder in the privatization of waste management firm EGF with an offer of 149.9 million euros ($193 million) in 2014. In 2015, he agreed to sell the operating rights for the Lisbon Oceanarium to Sociedade Francisco Manuel dos Santos for a larger-than-expected 114 million euros ($127 million).

In 2014, Moreira da Silva helped oversee the government's response to an outbreak of Legionnaires’ disease that killed twelve people and infected over 300, making it one of the world's largest ever outbreaks.

During his mandate as minister he also led the reform of the water services sector, the spatial planning reform, the demolition of illegal buildings on the coastline and the reintroduction of the Iberian lynx.

== Career in international organizations ==
=== United Nations Development Programme, UNDP, 2009-2012 ===
From 2009 to 2012, Moreira da Silva was Senior Environmental Finance Advisor and Program Manager for Climate Change Innovative Finance at the Bureau for Policy Development at the United Nations Development Programme (UNDP). At UNDP, he worked on the post-2012 climate change negotiations, on the establishment of innovative financing strategies on climate change and energy, and on the development of climate change market-based mechanisms.

=== OECD, 2016–2022 ===
As director of the OECD Development Co-operation Directorate, from 2016 to 2022, Moreira da Silva led the secretariat of the Development Assistance Committee, DAC.

During his mandate, the Official Development Assistance (ODA) reached successive all-time highs in 2020 (US$161 billion) and 2021 (US$185 billion) and he led the design and negotiation of new DAC standards on: Ending Sexual Exploitation, Abuse, and Harassment in Development Co-operation; enhancing coordination of the Humanitarian-Development Nexus; enabling Civil Society; Blended Finance Principles and Guidance; framework on SDG aligned finance; Impact Investing Standards for Financing Sustainable Development; decision to align development co-operation with the goals of the Paris Agreement (that ended new ODA for unabated international thermal coal power generation in 2021). He also led the development of a new development finance measurement tool, the Total Official Support for Sustainable Development (TOSSD). During his time at OECD he coordinated more than 500 reports in topics such as sustainable development, multilateralism, development finance, blended finance, impact investing, climate change, ocean economy, refugees, fragility, digitalisation, gender equality, trade, illicit financial flows, inequality and poverty, humanitarian aid, COVID-19, debt, democracy and fight against corruption.

In April 2022, Moreira da Silva announced his departure from OECD and his candidacy for the post as PSD chair. In the vote, he was defeated by Luís Montenegro, who had won all the districts in the country.

=== United Nations Office for Project Services (UNOPS), 2023–present ===
In 2023, United Nations Secretary-General António Guterres appointed Moreira da Silva as Executive Director of the United Nations Office for Project Services (UNOPS) with the rank of Under-Secretary-General of the United Nations.

== Honours ==
- Commander of the Order of Civil Merit, Spain (11 September 2007)
- Grande Officer of the Order of Prince Henry, Portugal (21 April 2009)
