= Luís Montenegro =

Prime Minister of Portugal since 2024

His Excellency Luís Montenegro
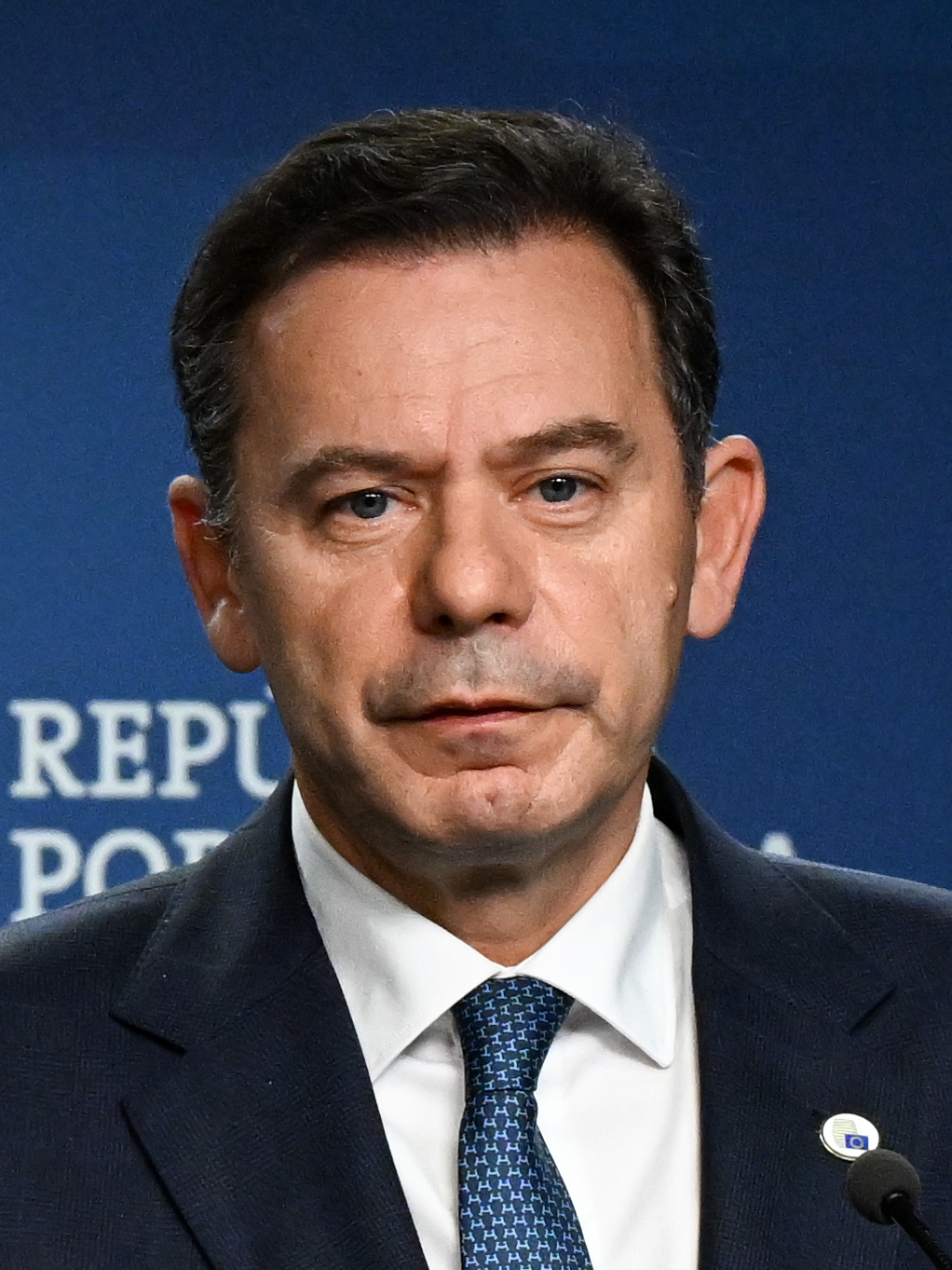
- Montenegro in 2025

Prime Minister of Portugal
- Incumbent
- Assumed office 2 April 2024
- President: Marcelo Rebelo de Sousa; António José Seguro
- Preceded by: António Costa

President of the Social Democratic Party
- Incumbent
- Assumed office 1 July 2022
- Secretary-General: Hugo Soares
- Preceded by: Rui Rio

Leader of the Opposition
- In office 1 July 2022 – 2 April 2024
- Prime Minister: António Costa
- Preceded by: Rui Rio
- Succeeded by: Pedro Nuno Santos
Parliamentary offices
President of the Parliamentary Group of the Social Democratic Party
In office 29 June 2011 – 19 July 2017
| Preceded by | Miguel Macedo |
| Succeeded by | Hugo Soares |
Member of the Assembly of the Republic
Incumbent
Assumed office 26 March 2024
| Constituency | Lisbon (2024–2025); Aveiro (since 2025) |
In office 4 April 2002 – 5 April 2018
| Constituency | Aveiro |
President of the Municipal Assembly of Espinho
In office 11 October 2009 – 29 September 2013
| Preceded by | Graça Guedes |
| Succeeded by | Guy Viseu |
Member of the Municipal Assembly of Espinho
In office 14 December 1997 – 11 October 2009

Personal details
- Born: Luís Filipe Montenegro Cardoso de Morais Esteves; 16 February 1973 (age 53) Porto, Portugal
- Party: Social Democratic Party (1991–present)
- Spouse: Carla Neto Montenegro (m. 2000)
- Children: 2
- Education: Catholic University of Portugal
- Occupation: Lawyer; politician

Luís Filipe Montenegro Cardoso de Morais Esteves (Note: European Portuguese: [luˈiʒ mõtɨˈneɣɾu]) (born 16 February 1973) is a Portuguese politician and lawyer serving as the prime minister of Portugal since April 2024, currently leading the 25th Constitutional Government. Additionally, he has been president of the Social Democratic Party (PSD) since 2022.

Montenegro was a member of the Assembly of the Republic from Aveiro from 2002 to 2018, leading his party's parliamentary group between 2011 and 2017. After being defeated by Rui Rio in his party's 2020 leadership election, he won against Jorge Moreira da Silva in 2022 and became President of the PSD.

Under Montenegro's leadership, the PSD and CDS-PP formed the centre-right Democratic Alliance and won a plurality of seats in the 2024 Portuguese legislative election. He was appointed prime minister by President Marcelo Rebelo de Sousa, leading the XXIV Constitutional Government, a coalition minority government. His government fell in March 2025 after losing a vote of confidence amid an alleged conflict of interest affair, but the Democratic Alliance increased its plurality of seats in the subsequent snap election and formed the XXV Constitutional Government.

== Early life and education ==
Montenegro was born in Porto and raised in Espinho in the Aveiro District. He graduated from the Porto School of Law at the Catholic University of Portugal and became a lawyer, the same profession as his father and grandfather.

== Political career ==
=== Local politics ===
Montenegro was president of the Social Democratic Youth in Espinho from 1994 to 1996. He served on the city's council from 1997 to 2001, and ran for mayor in 2005, losing to José Mota of the Socialist Party (PS) by a 45% to 38% margin.

=== Assembly of the Republic ===
In 2002, 29-year-old Montenegro was elected to the Assembly of the Republic for Aveiro. He was invited by Pedro Santana Lopes to join his cabinet as a Secretary of State, but he refused.

After being promoted in politics by Luís Marques Mendes, he supported his candidacy for party leader in 2005. In the 2007 leadership election, Montenegro endorsed Luís Filipe Menezes, who defeated Marques Mendes and, after Menezes resigned in 2008, he supported Santana Lopes's candidacy, being his spokesperson.

He became the PSD parliamentary group's deputy leader to Santana Lopes in 2007 and Miguel Macedo in 2010, and he received 86% of the votes to lead the group in June 2011, after PSD member Pedro Passos Coelho had been elected prime minister.

The early years of Montenegro's leadership in parliament coincided with the European troika intervention to deal with the financial crisis; he was criticised in January 2014 for saying "the life of the people is no better, but the life of the country is a lot better". He defended the implementation of a strict economic austerity programme negotiated by Portugal in exchange for an international financial bailout. He left parliament in February 2018 after Passos Coelho's resignation, warning that the PSD should not turn into new leader "Rui Rio's group of friends".

In early January 2019, amid bad polling numbers for the PSD, Montenegro challenged Rio to call a leadership ballot, with Montenegro announcing he would run against him. Rio refused to call a leadership ballot, but instead called for a motion of confidence in his leadership. Rio won the motion by a 75 to 50 vote.

Following the Social Democrats' defeat in the 2019 legislative election, in January 2020, Montenegro again challenged Rio for the PSD leadership election. During the campaign, Rio attacked Montenegro for being a Freemason. In the run-off, Rio won with 53.2% of the votes, against the 46.8% for Montenegro.

=== Leader of the PSD ===
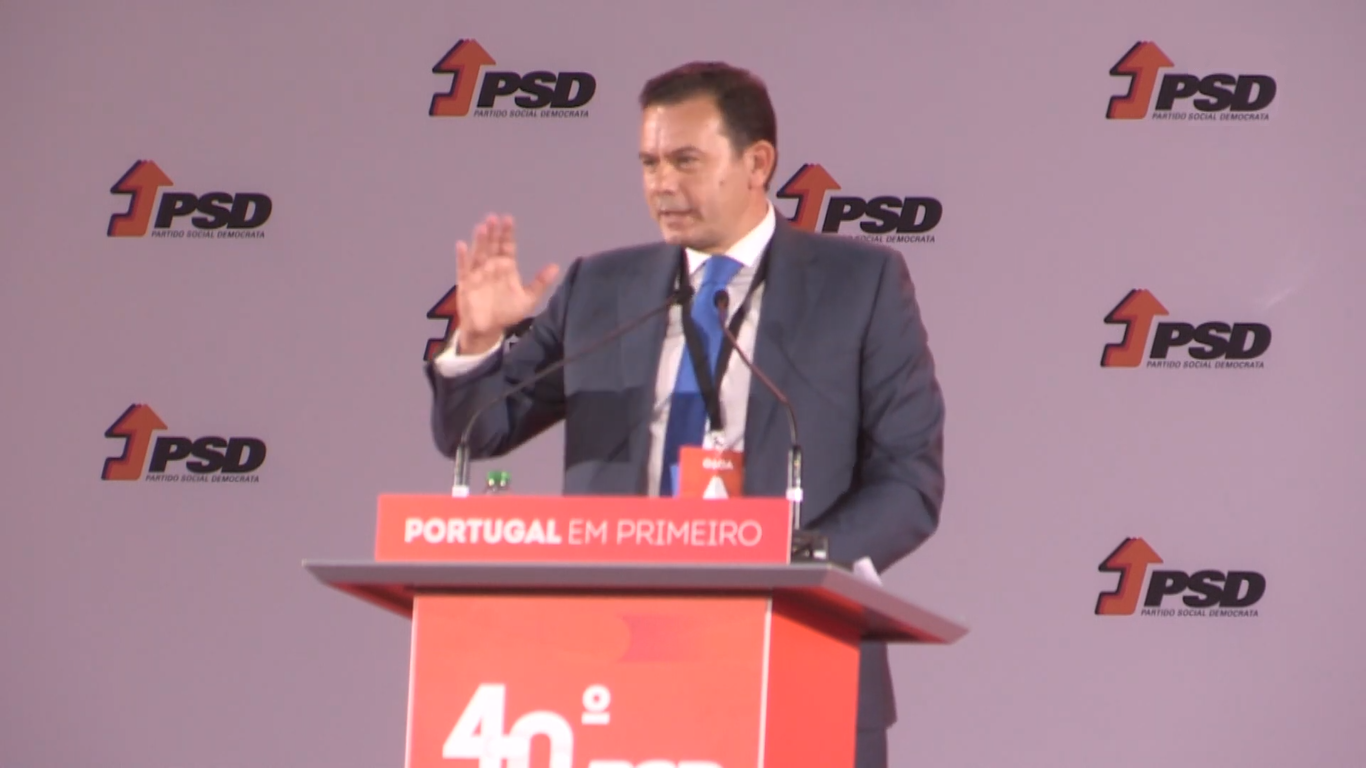
Montenegro speaks at the PSD's 40th National Congress, 12 July 2022.

Rio resigned following the PSD's poor performance in the 2022 Portuguese legislative election. Montenegro was the first person to put himself forward for the party leadership election, in which he ran against former minister Jorge Moreira da Silva. Montenegro won with 72.47% of the votes, beating his opponent in every district.

Under Montenegro's leadership, the PSD reached an agreement in January 2024 with the CDS-PP for a pre-electoral alliance as they sought to bolster their chances of winning the national elections later that year. The Democratic Alliance took the most seats in the election with 80, two more than the PS. One of Montenegro's campaign promises was the full privatisation of TAP Air Portugal.

On 21 March 2024, President Marcelo Rebelo de Sousa invited Montenegro to form a government. Montenegro's new government was approved by the president on 28 March.

== Prime Minister of Portugal ==
=== First government (2024–2025) ===
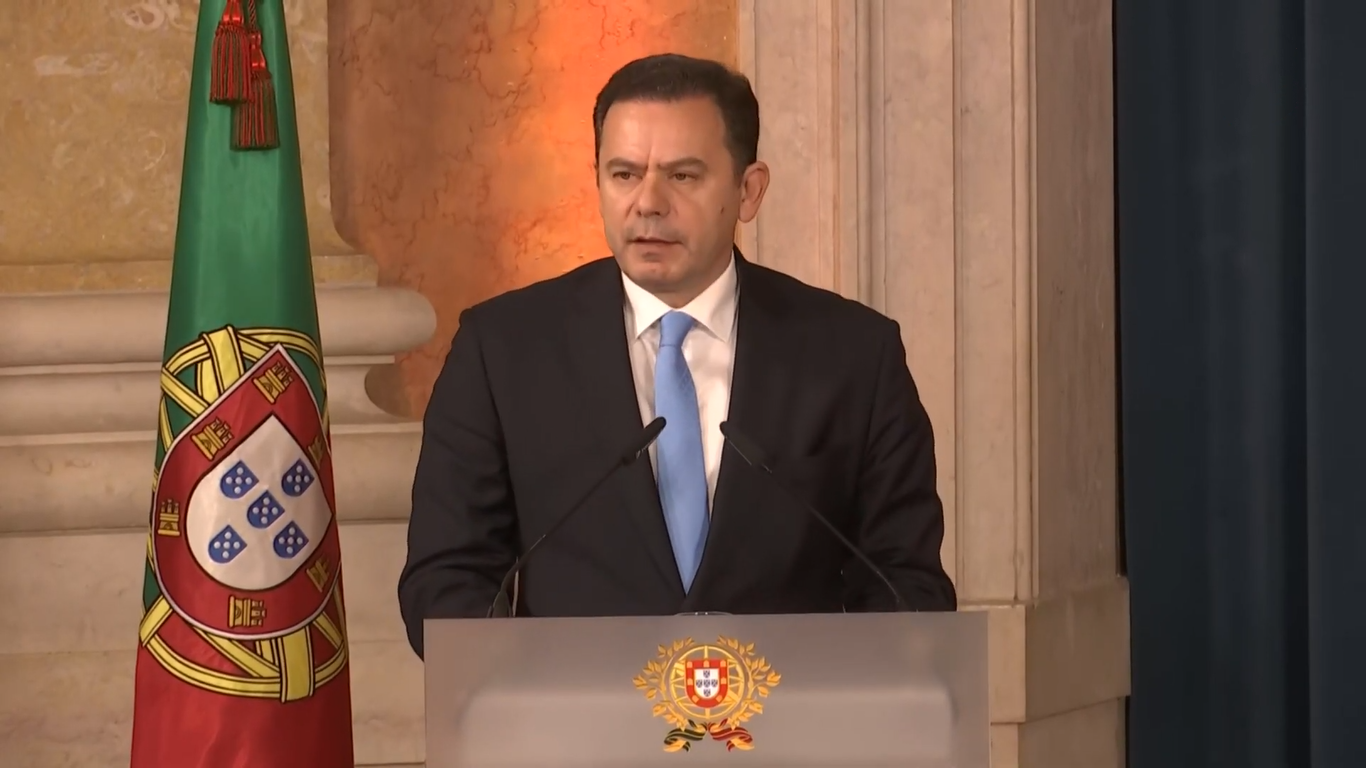
Montenegro delivers his first speech as Prime Minister in Ajuda Palace, 2 April 2024.

Montenegro was sworn in as prime minister of Portugal, heading the XXIV Constitutional Government, on 2 April 2024 at a ceremony in the Ajuda National Palace in Lisbon. Prior to taking office, Montenegro vowed to govern with a minority government instead of forming a coalition with the ascendant right-wing populist party Chega, and decried their leader André Ventura as "often xenophobic, racist, populist and excessively demagogic".

In May 2024, the Portuguese government under Montenegro announced that a new Lisbon airport would be built in Alcochete and would be ready by 2034.

Days before the 2024 European Parliament election, Montenegro announced a toughening of Portugal's immigration laws; the country had previously allowed those with a tourist visa to apply for residency. He said that the existing laws had led to "excessive abuse of our willingness to receive".

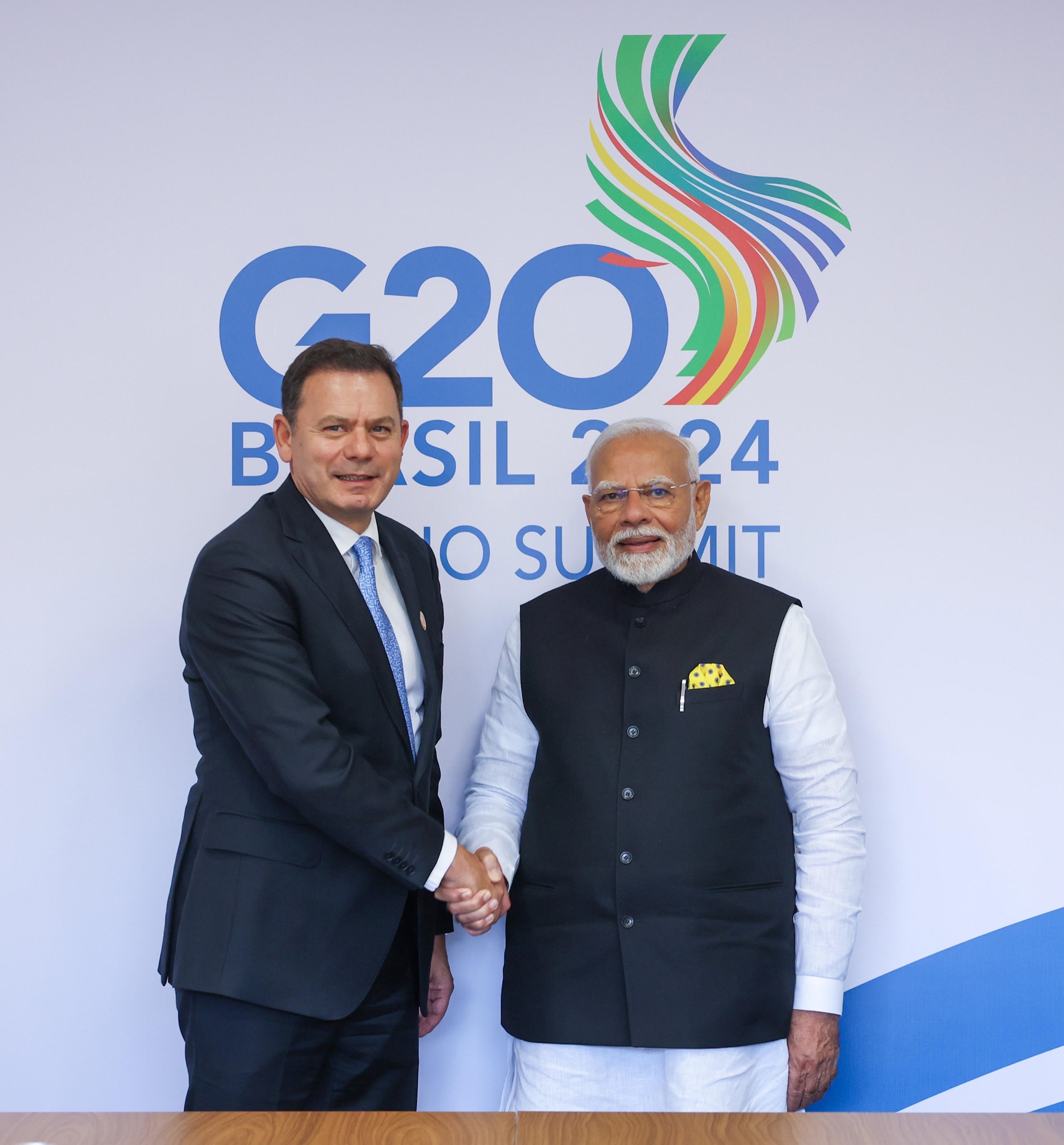
Montenegro with Indian Prime Minister Narendra Modi in 2024.

In July 2024, he announced a reduction in corporate income tax from the current 21% to 15%. This measure would cost the public purse around 500 million euros a year.

In September 2024, Montenegro ran unopposed in the PSD leadership election. He received 97.45% of the votes, while the majority of party members did not vote.

==== Tax benefits and Spinumviva cases ====
In 2023, an anonymous complaint was sent to the Portuguese Public Prosecution Service alleging that Montenegro received tax benefits granted for the restoration of old buildings when he did a complete demolition of an old building and built a new one in its place, in Espinho. A criminal investigation was later opened. On 2 December 2024, the Public Prosecution Office announced the closure of the criminal investigation due to finding no evidence of crimes or irregularities.

On 15 February 2025, Correio da Manhã newspaper published an investigation in which they found that Montenegro's family has a business with real estate interests, called Spinumviva. Montenegro confirmed the existence of the company, but denied it being only a real estate and that he had sold his shares to his wife after being elected PSD leader in 2022, denying any conflict of interest. Opposition party Chega criticized the lack of answers from Montenegro and announced a motion of no confidence, that was rejected by Parliament. However, it was later revealed that Montenegro's sale of his shares to his wife was, in fact, null, as the law does not allow share sales between spouses, making Montenegro still an active shareholder of the company. This raised further questions of possible conflicts of interest and Montenegro was pressed to reveal his full list of clients, something he avoided.

On 28 February 2025, Expresso newspaper reported that Spinumviva has been receiving a monthly payment of 4,500 euros by one of their clients, Solverde, a casino company, since 2021 and which continued while Montenegro was Prime Minister. In the aftermath of this report, Spinumviva disclosed the full list of clients and the services provided. On the same day, Montenegro announced he would "analyze his personal and political situation" and announce a decision on 1 March. Montenegro announced that his wife would leave the business and it would for now on be managed by his two sons, plus, he challenged Parliament to confirm its confidence in him, otherwise he would call a vote of confidence. Two days later, on 3 March, the Public Prosecution office announced that they received an anonymous tip against Montenegro and his company, adding that, for now, they are examining the complaint. The Socialist Party also announced a Parliamentary inquiry committee to investigate the case. Montenegro called a vote of confidence, which he lost on 11 March, leading to the fall of his government. The motion lost 137 to 87 with no abstentions. More than 9 months after it was opened, the Public Prosecutor's Office closed the preliminary investigation, with no charges filed, on 17 December 2025.

==== 2025 election ====
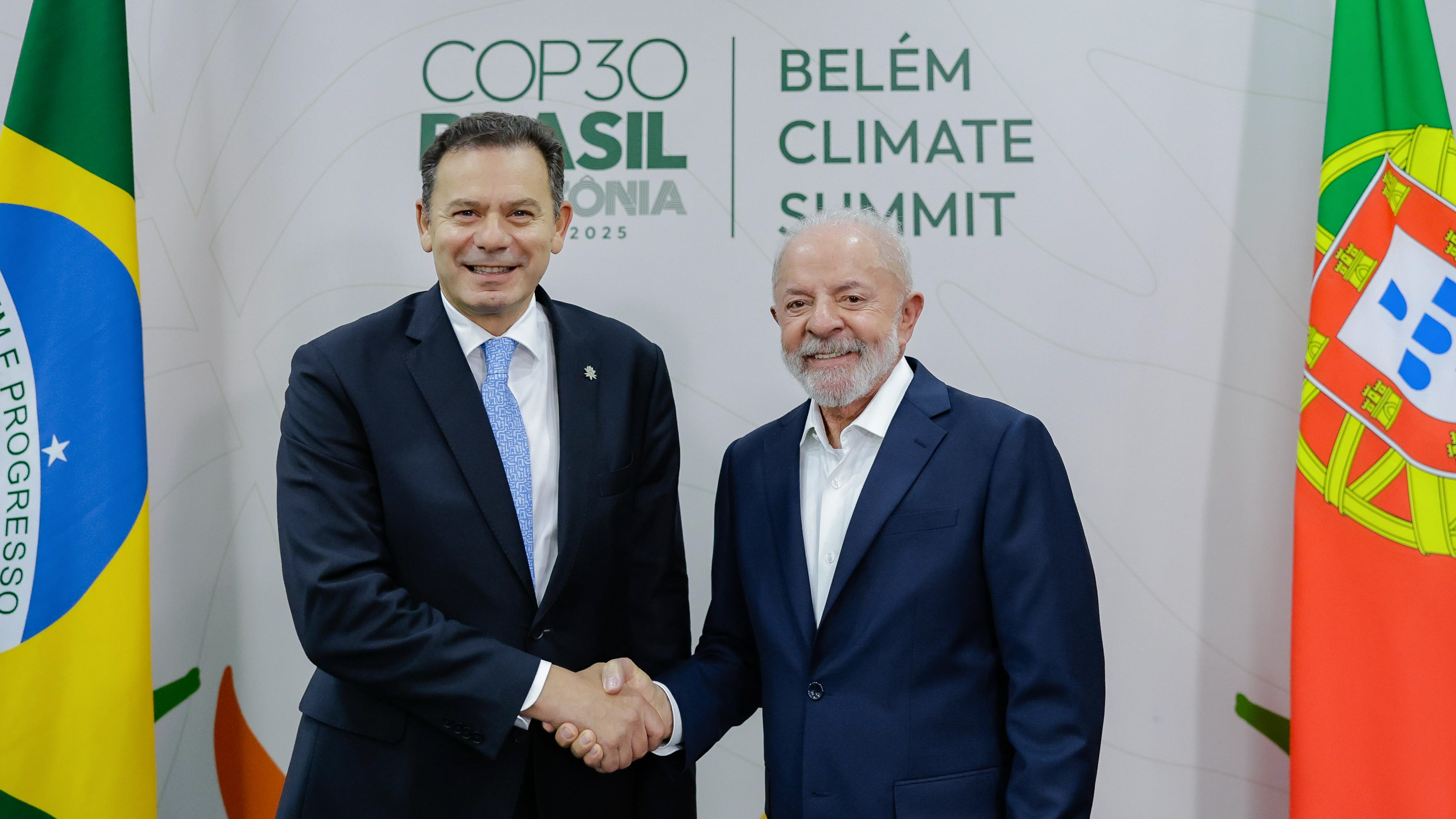
Montenegro with Brazilian President Lula da Silva during COP30, 7 November 2025.

President Marcelo Rebelo de Sousa had made clear that he would call snap elections if the government did not pass the motion of confidence. An election was called for 18 May 2025, in which Montenegro's alliance retained its plurality in parliament, but again fell short of a majority. The Democratic Alliance gained seats, while the PS lost seats and Chega made gains.

=== Second government ===
On 29 May, Montenegro was invited once again to form a new government. The XXV Constitutional Government of Portugal was sworn in on 5 June. His second term has been dominated by issues like immigration, with the approval of new legislation, supported by Chega, which further restricts migration policy, labour reforms that have received strong criticisms from trade unions, reforms to the National Health Service and to the welfare state, in addition to trying to address the growing housing crisis.

His government's response to environmental disasters, such as the August 2025 Portuguese wildfires and the January 2026 Storm Kristin, have also raised questions of alleged slow response and lack of coordination, with the latter leading to the resignation of Maria Lúcia Amaral as minister of home affairs.

During the 2026 Iran war, Montenegro urged maximum restraint by all parties and condemned Iran's strikes on neighboring states, while reiterating that Iran must end its nuclear program. He defended his government's decision to allow the United States to use Lajes Air Base in the Azores for logistical support during military operations against Iran.

Montenegro's cabinet was plagued by a series of cases during the summer of 2026. The collapse of the new digital marking system for school exams, which delayed grades for more than 300,000 students, and the public prosecutor's inquiry that fell on the new Minister of Home Afairs, Luís Neves, which led to a motion of no confidence being presented by Chega in September 2026, caused an erosion of the public's perception of Montenegro's government.

== Personal life ==
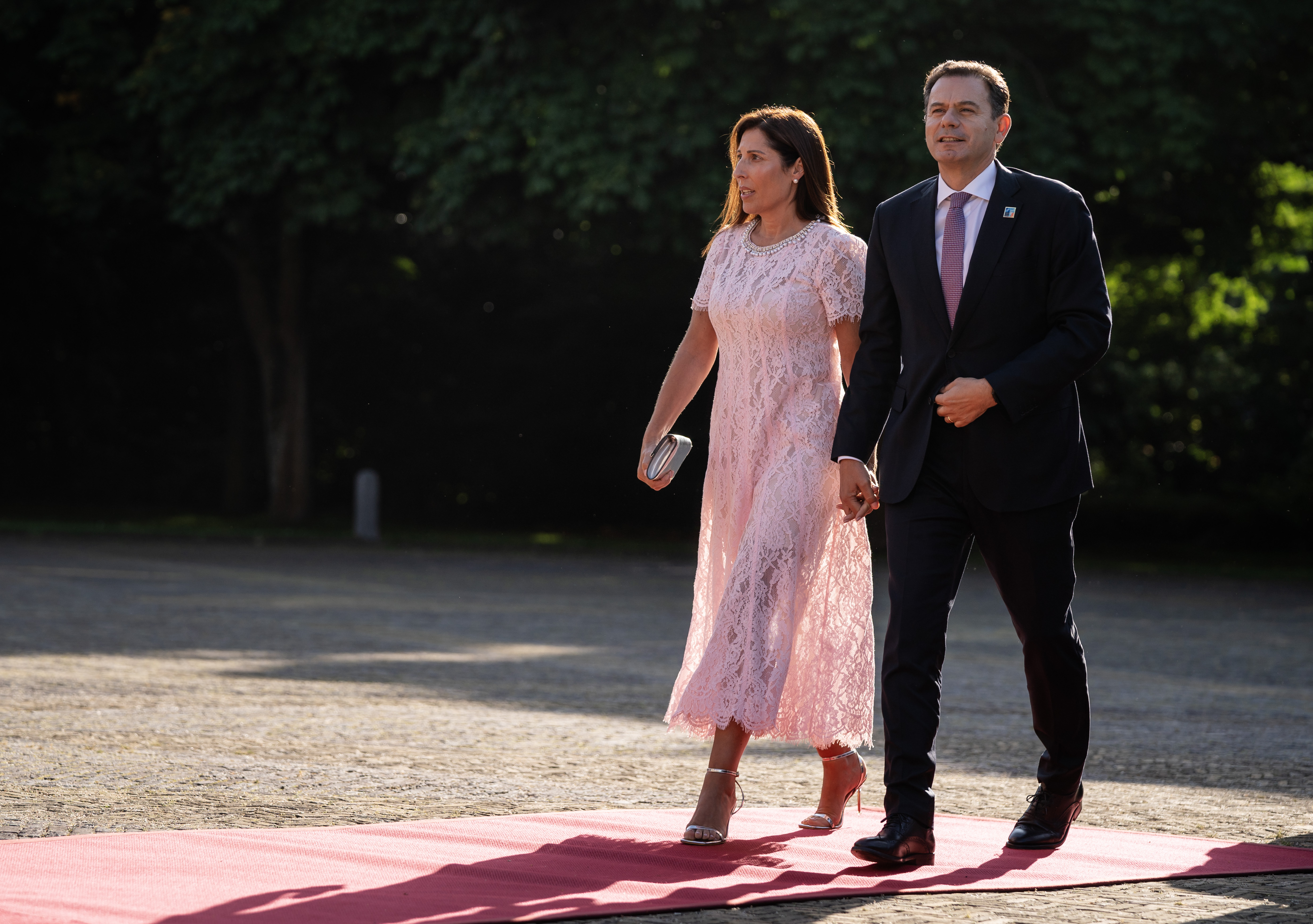
Montenegro with his wife, Carla, during the 2025 The Hague NATO summit, 24 June 2025.

Montenegro was nicknamed Ervilha ("Pea") as a child for being small, round-figured and green-eyed, while his immediate family knew him by his middle name, Filipe. He took part in football and beach volleyball, and worked as a lifeguard as a youth, later taking up golf. In football, he supports FC Porto and S.C. Espinho, the teams of his birthplace and residence, respectively. As of May 2022, he is married and has two children.

A variety of sources dating from 2012, including SAPO's Polígrafo fact-checking website, Público, Expresso, Jornal de Negócios and Diário de Notícias maintain that in 2008, Montenegro was admitted into the Mozart Lodge, a Masonic lodge comprising politicians, businessmen and spies. In 2019, Montenegro denied being a Freemason.

== Electoral history ==
=== Espinho City Council election, 2005 ===
Ballot: 9 October 2005
| Party | Candidate | Votes | % | Seats | +/− |
|---|---|---|---|---|---|
| PS | José Mota | 9,208 | 44.9 | 4 | ±0 |
| PSD/CDS–PP | Luís Montenegro | 7,784 | 38.0 | 3 | ±0 |
| CDU | Fausto Neves | 1,460 | 7.1 | 0 | ±0 |
| BE | Carminda Flores | 590 | 2.9 | 0 | new |
| Independent | Alfredo de Araújo | 463 | 2.3 | 0 | new |
| Blank/Invalid ballots | | 995 | 4.9 | – | – |
| Turnout | | 20,500 | 67.70 | 7 | ±0 |
Source: Autárquicas 2005

=== PSD leadership election, 2020 ===
Ballot: 11 and 18 January 2020
| Candidate | 1st round | | 2nd round | |
| Candidate | Votes | % | Votes | % |
|---|---|---|---|---|
| Rui Rio | 15,546 | 49.0 | 17,157 | 53.2 |
| Luís Montenegro | 13,137 | 41.4 | 15,086 | 46.8 |
| Miguel Pinto Luz | 3,030 | 9.6 | | |
| Blank/Invalid ballots | 369 | – | 341 | – |
| Turnout | 32,082 | 79.01 | 32,582 | 80.20 |
Source: Resultados

=== PSD leadership election, 2022 ===
Ballot: 28 May 2022
| Candidate | Votes | % |
|---|---|---|
| Luís Montenegro | 19,241 | 72.5 |
| Jorge Moreira da Silva | 7,306 | 27.5 |
| Blank/Invalid ballots | 437 | – |
| Turnout | 26,984 | 60.46 |
Source: Resultados

=== Legislative election, 2024 ===
Ballot: 10 March 2024
| Party | Candidate | Votes | % | Seats | +/− |
|---|---|---|---|---|---|
| AD | Luís Montenegro | 1,867,442 | 28.8 | 80 | +3 |
| PS | Pedro Nuno Santos | 1,812,443 | 28.0 | 78 | –42 |
| Chega | André Ventura | 1,169,781 | 18.1 | 50 | +38 |
| IL | Rui Rocha | 319,877 | 4.9 | 8 | ±0 |
| BE | Mariana Mortágua | 282,314 | 4.4 | 5 | ±0 |
| CDU | Paulo Raimundo | 205,551 | 3.2 | 4 | –2 |
| Livre | Rui Tavares | 204,875 | 3.2 | 4 | +3 |
| PAN | Inês Sousa Real | 126,125 | 2.0 | 1 | ±0 |
| ADN | Bruno Fialho | 102,134 | 1.6 | 0 | ±0 |
| Other parties | | 104,167 | 1.6 | 0 | ±0 |
| Blank/Invalid ballots | | 282,243 | 4.4 | – | – |
| Turnout | | 6,476,952 | 59.90 | 230 | ±0 |
Source: Comissão Nacional de Eleições

=== PSD leadership election, 2024 ===
Ballot: 6 September 2024
| Candidate | Votes | % |
|---|---|---|
| Luís Montenegro | 16,198 | 97.5 |
| Blank/Invalid ballots | 423 | 2.5 |
| Turnout | 16,621 | 39.70 |
Source: Resultados

=== Legislative election, 2025 ===
Ballot: 18 May 2025
| Party | Candidate | Votes | % | Seats | +/− |
|---|---|---|---|---|---|
| AD | Luís Montenegro | 2,008,488 | 31.8 | 91 | +11 |
| PS | Pedro Nuno Santos | 1,442,546 | 22.8 | 58 | –20 |
| Chega | André Ventura | 1,438,554 | 22.8 | 60 | +10 |
| IL | Rui Rocha | 338,974 | 5.4 | 9 | +1 |
| Livre | Rui Tavares | 257,291 | 4.1 | 6 | +2 |
| CDU | Paulo Raimundo | 183,686 | 2.9 | 3 | –1 |
| BE | Mariana Mortágua | 125,808 | 2.0 | 1 | –4 |
| PAN | Inês Sousa Real | 86,930 | 1.4 | 1 | ±0 |
| ADN | Bruno Fialho | 81,660 | 1.3 | 0 | ±0 |
| Other parties | | 95,384 | 1.5 | 1 | +1 |
| Blank/Invalid ballots | | 260,648 | 4.1 | – | – |
| Turnout | | 6,319,969 | 58.25 | 230 | ±0 |
Source: Comissão Nacional de Eleições

=== PSD leadership election, 2026 ===
Ballot: 30 May 2026
| Candidate | Votes | % |
|---|---|---|
| Luís Montenegro | 14,468 | 94.8 |
| Blank/Invalid ballots | 794 | 5.2 |
| Turnout | 15,261 | 26.84 |
Source: Resultados

== See also ==
- List of current heads of state and government
- List of heads of the executive by approval rating

== Notes ==
Political offices
| Preceded by Rui Rio | Leader of the Opposition; 2022–2024 | Succeeded by Pedro Nuno Santos |
| Preceded by António Costa | Prime Minister of Portugal; 2024–present | Incumbent |
Party political offices
| Preceded by Miguel Macedo | President of the Parliamentary Group of the Social Democratic Party; 2011–2017 | Succeeded by Hugo Soares |
| Preceded by Rui Rio | President of the Social Democratic Party; 2022–present | Incumbent |
