= President of the Municipal Chamber =

Local official

President of the Municipal Chamber (Portuguese: Presidente da Câmara Municipal) is the title of the mayor in Portugal and other Portuguese-speaking countries. In Brazil, the same title refers to the speaker of the legislative body of the municipality, while the title of the mayor is "Prefect" or Prefeito.
