= Rui Ramos =

Rui Ramos may refer to:

- Rui Ramos (athlete) (born 1930), Portuguese athlete
- Rui Ramos (historian) (born 1962), Portuguese historian
- Rui Ramos (footballer) (born 1995), Portuguese footballer

== See also ==
- Ruy Ramos (born 1957), Brazilian-born Japanese footballer
