= 2022 Portuguese legislative election =

Legislative election held in Portugal

- 30 January 2022 (Note: Election in the Europe constituency was annulled by the Constitutional Court in February 2022. New ballots were accepted until 23 March 2022.)

All 230 seats in the Assembly of the Republic 116 seats needed for a majority
- Opinion polls
- Registered: 10,813,246 ▲0.3%
- Turnout: 5,564,539 (51.5%) ▲2.9 pp
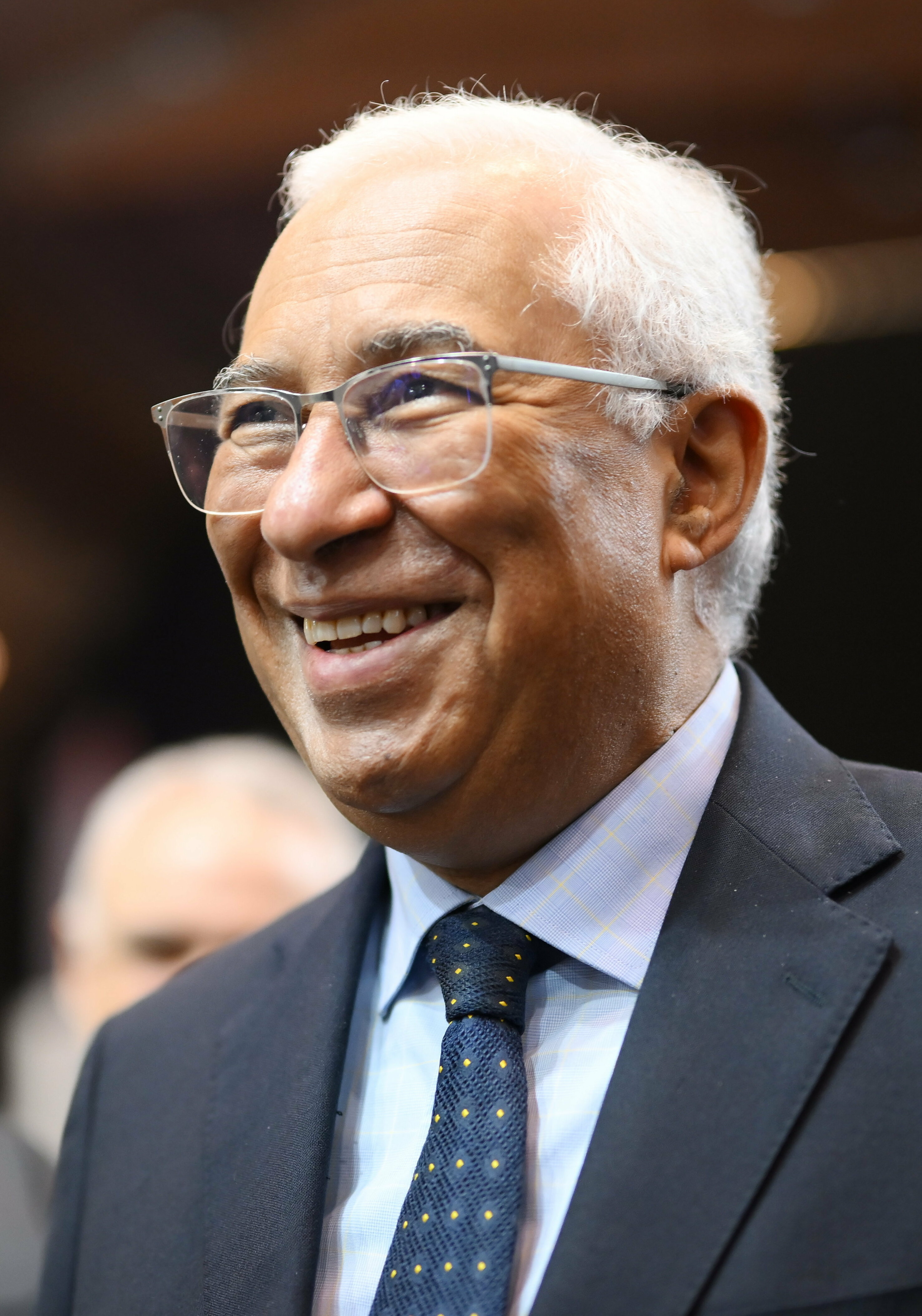

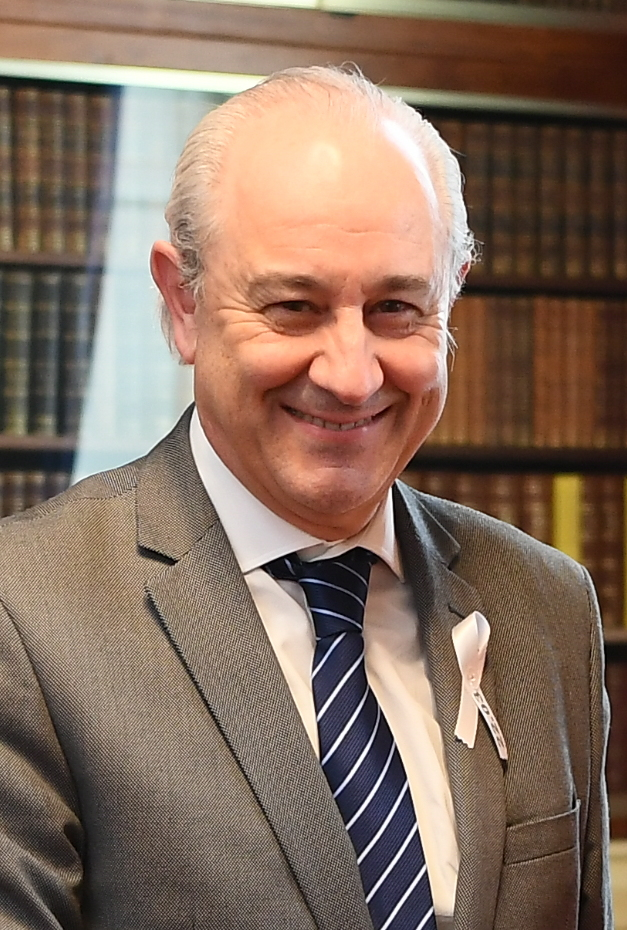

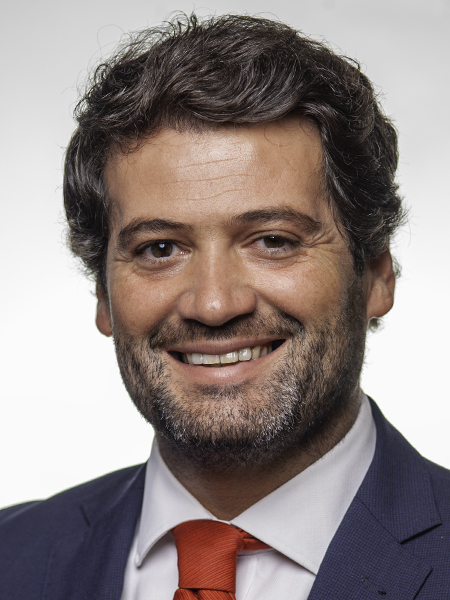

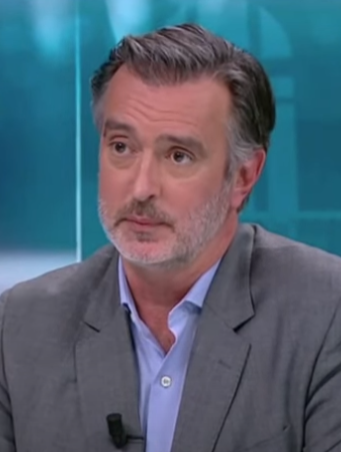

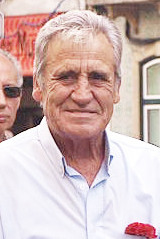

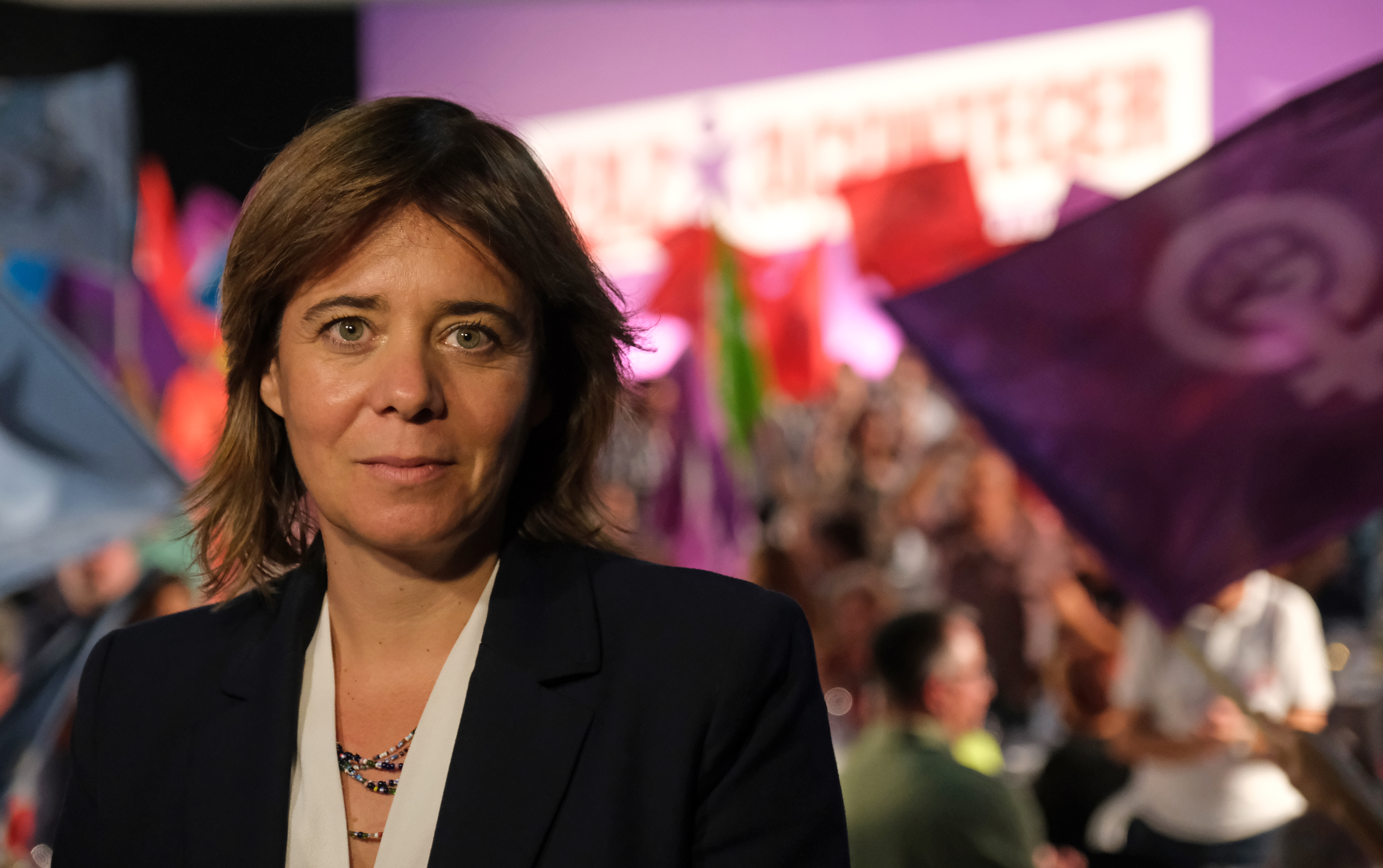

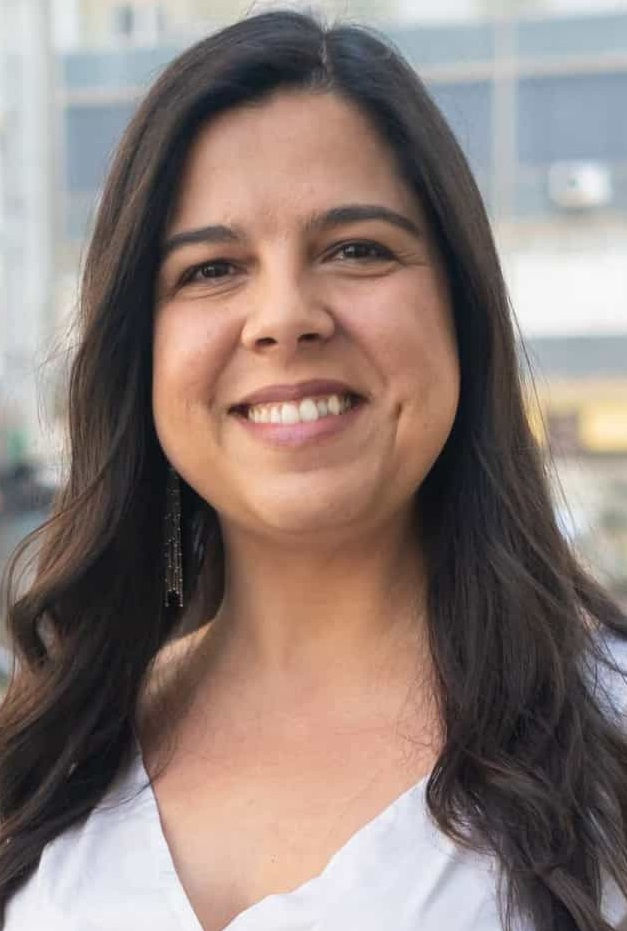

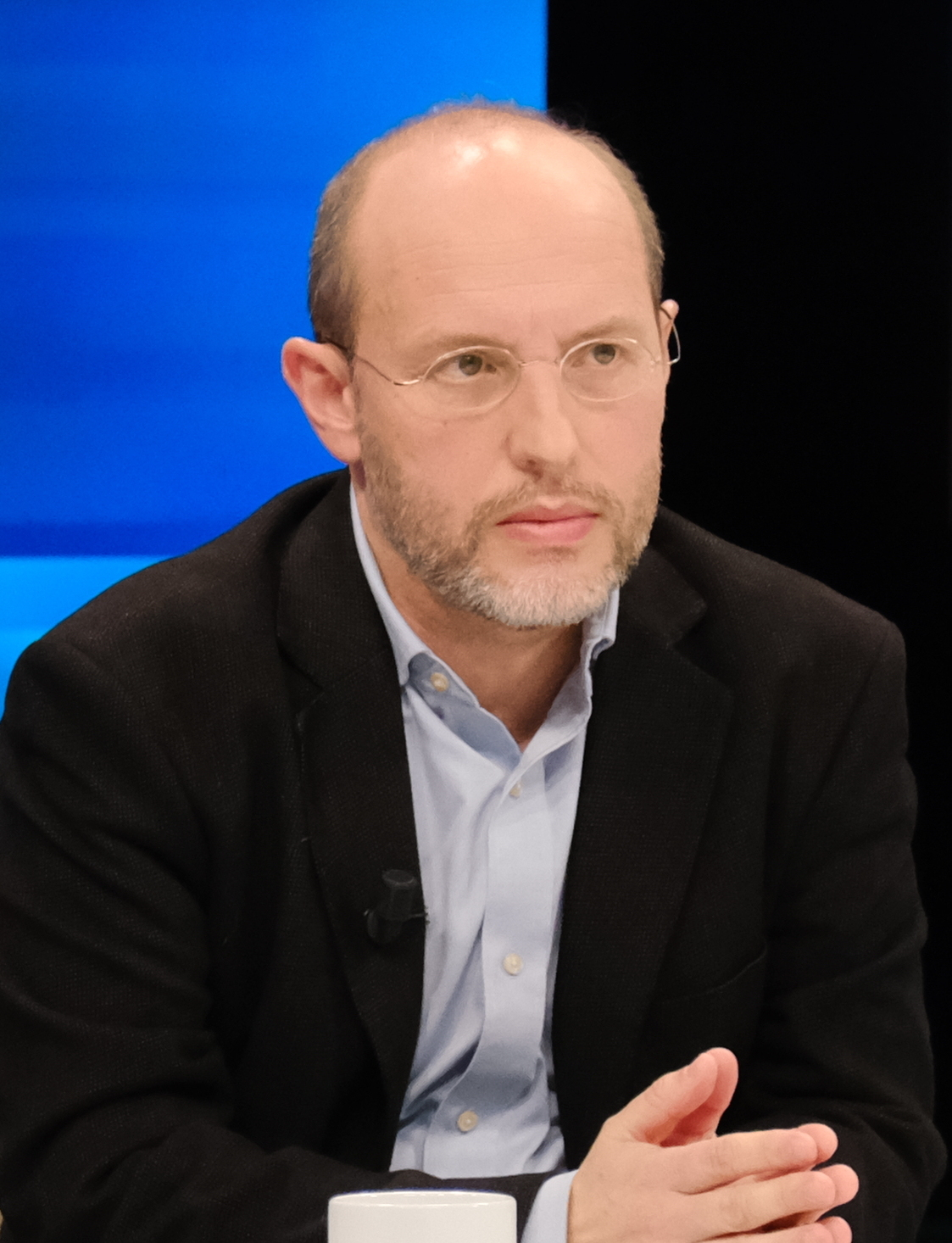

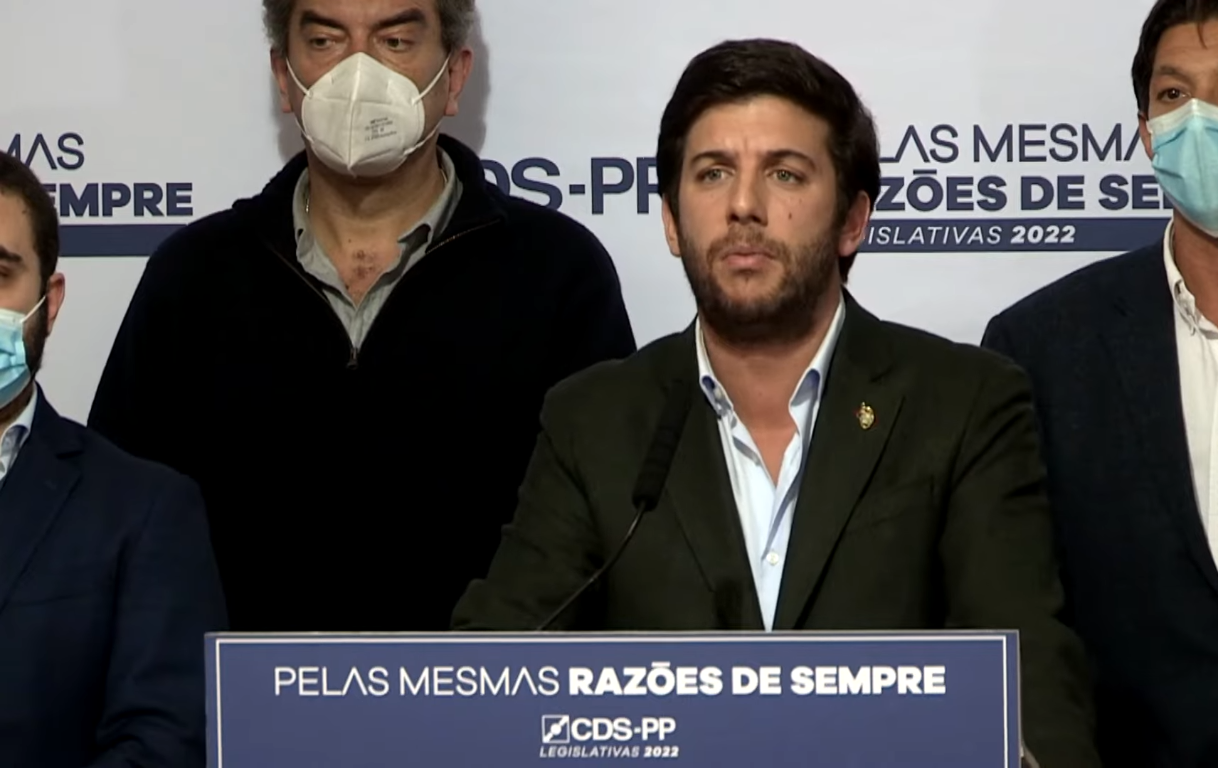
	First party	Second party	Third party
Leader	António Costa	Rui Rio	André Ventura
Party	PS	PSD	CH
Leader since	28 September 2014	18 February 2018	9 April 2019
Leader's seat	Lisbon	Porto	Lisbon
Last election	108 seats, 36.3%	79 seats, 27.8%	1 seat, 1.3%
Seats won	120	77	12
Seat change	▲12	▼2	▲11
Popular vote	2,302,601	1,618,381 (Note: Sum of the votes of the Social Democratic Party (PSD) in mainland Portugal and the PSD/CDS – People's Party (CDS–PP) coalitions in Azores and Madeira. The 5 MPs elected in these coalitions are all from the PSD.)	399,659
Percentage	41.4%	29.1%	7.2%
Swing	▲5.1 pp	▲1.3 pp	▲5.9 pp
	Fourth party	Fifth party	Sixth party
Leader	João Cotrim de Figueiredo	Jerónimo de Sousa	Catarina Martins
Party	IL	PCP	BE
Alliance		CDU
Leader since	8 December 2019	27 November 2004	30 November 2014
Leader's seat	Lisbon	Lisbon	Porto
Last election	1 seat, 1.3%	12 seats, 6.3% (Note: The Portuguese Communist Party (PCP) and the Ecologist Party "The Greens" (PEV) have contested every election since 1987 in a coalition called the Unitary Democratic Coalition (CDU) and won a combined 6.3% of the vote and elected 12 MPs to parliament in 2019.)	19 seats, 9.5%
Seats won	8	6	5
Seat change	▲7	▼6	▼14
Popular vote	273,687	238,920	244,603
Percentage	4.9%	4.3%	4.4%
Swing	▲3.6 pp	▼1.9 pp	▼5.1 pp
	Seventh party	Eighth party	Ninth party
Leader	Inês Sousa Real	Rui Tavares (Note: Tavares was the party's main candidate in this campaign.)	Francisco Rodrigues dos Santos
Party	PAN	LIVRE	CDS–PP
Leader since	6 June 2021	11 August 2019	26 January 2020
Leader's seat	Lisbon	Lisbon	Lisbon (lost)
Last election	4 seats, 3.3%	1 seat, 1.1% (Note: LIVRE had 1 MP elected to parliament in 2019, Joacine Katar Moreira, but she was expelled from the LIVRE caucus in January 2020.)	5 seats, 4.2%
Seats won	1	1	0
Seat change	▼3	Steady	▼5
Popular vote	88,152	71,232	89,181
Percentage	1.6%	1.3%	1.6%
Swing	▼1.7 pp	▲0.2 pp	▼2.6 pp
Prime Minister before election
António Costa
PS
Prime Minister after election
António Costa
PS

An early legislative election was held on 30 January 2022 in Portugal to elect members of the Assembly of the Republic to the 15th Legislature of the Third Portuguese Republic. All 230 seats to the Assembly of the Republic were up for election.

The election was called after the government's state budget was rejected by Parliament in late October 2021. This election was also the third national election held in Portugal during the COVID-19 pandemic - as the country held a presidential election (January) and local elections (September) in 2021 - and the fourth overall, with the Azorean regional election in October 2020.

The Socialist Party (PS) of incumbent Prime Minister António Costa won an unexpected majority government in the Assembly of the Republic, the second in the party's history. The PS received 41.4 percent of the vote and 120 seats, four seats above the minimum required for a majority. The PS won the most votes in all districts in mainland Portugal, only failing to win the Autonomous Region of Madeira. Political analysts considered the PS to have benefited from voters of the BE and the Unitary Democratic Coalition (CDU) casting their votes for the PS instead.

The Social Democratic Party (PSD) remained stable but underperformed opinion polls that had predicted a close race with the PS. The PSD won 29.1 percent of the vote, a slightly higher share than in 2019, and received 77 seats, two seats less than the previous election. The PSD was surpassed by the PS in districts like Leiria and Viseu, and lost Bragança by only 15 votes to the PS. In the aftermath of the election, party leader Rui Rio announced he would resign from the leadership.

Chega finished in third place, winning 12 seats and 7.2 percent of the vote. The Liberal Initiative (IL) finished in fourth place, winning 8 seats and 4.9 percent of the vote. Both parties experienced a surge of voters and made gains this election, though Chega received 100,000 fewer votes than its leader had received in the previous year's presidential election, an election in which turnout was lower.

Both BE and CDU suffered significant losses, being surpassed by the IL and Chega. Their rejection of the 2022 budget was considered to be a factor in losing votes and seats, along with tactical voting. The BE won 5 seats and 4.4 percent of the vote. CDU won 6 seats and 4.3 percent of the vote, while losing seats in Évora and Santarém districts. The Ecologist Party "The Greens" (PEV) lost all their seats for the first time.

The CDS – People's Party (CDS–PP) lost all their seats for the first time, receiving 1.6 percent of the vote. Party leader Francisco Rodrigues dos Santos announced his resignation. People Animals Nature (PAN) suffered losses as well, winning 1 seat and 1.6 percent of the vote, 3 fewer seats than in the previous election. LIVRE won 1 seat and received 1.3 percent of the vote, holding on to the single seat they won in the previous election, with party leader Rui Tavares being elected in Lisbon.

Voter turnout grew, compared with the previous election, with 51.5 percent of registered voters casting a ballot, despite the COVID-19 pandemic in Portugal.

After controversies and accusations because of the counting of overseas ballots, the Constitutional Court forced the repetition of the election in the Europe constituency, which elects two MPs. Therefore, the swearing in of the new Parliament and Government was delayed by a month and a half. The rerun of the election in the overseas constituency of Europe occurred, for in person voting, on 12 and 13 March 2022, and postal ballots were received until 23 March 2022. The final, certified results of the election were published in the official journal, Diário da República, on 26 March 2022.

== Background ==
After winning the October 2019 legislative election with 36% of the votes, more than 8 percentage points ahead of the PSD, the Socialists decided to not renew the 2015 "Geringonça" (Contraption) deal with the Left Bloc and the Communist Party, opting to govern through a case-by-case approach between the left-wing and right-wing opposition parties. This option, exacerbated by the impact of the COVID-19 pandemic outbreak, increased political instability, despite a robust post-pandemic economic recovery. During Costa's second minority government term, the PS lost the regional government of the Azores, and also suffered losses in the 2021 local elections, especially in Lisbon.

=== Fall of the government ===
On 27 October 2021, the budget proposed by the Socialist minority government was rejected by the Assembly of the Republic. The Left Bloc (BE) and the Portuguese Communist Party (PCP), both of whom had previously supported the government, joined the centre-right to right-wing opposition parties and rejected the budget. Prime Minister António Costa said to members of parliament, in his speech before the final vote, that he would not resign and would ask for a "stable, reinforced and lasting new majority" if an early election was called.

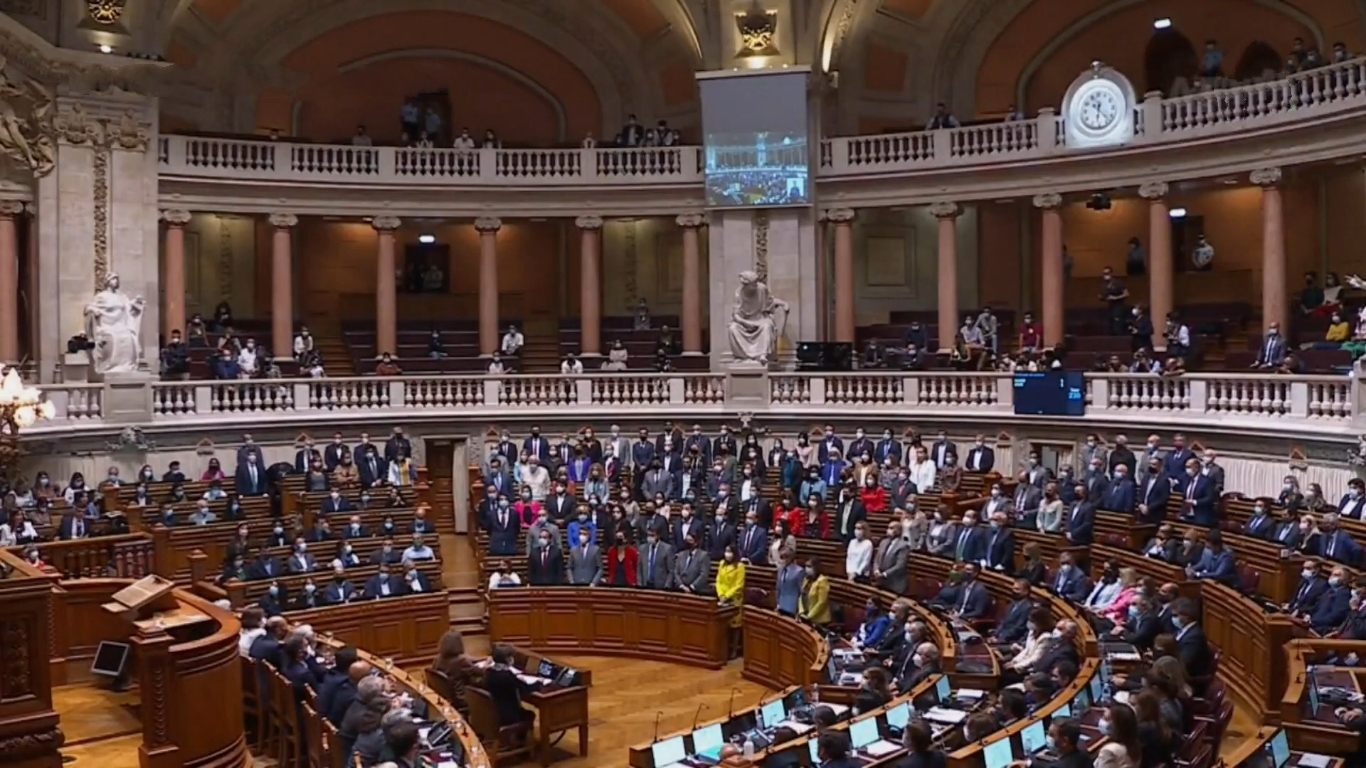
2022 State Budget debate: Socialist MPs voting in favour.

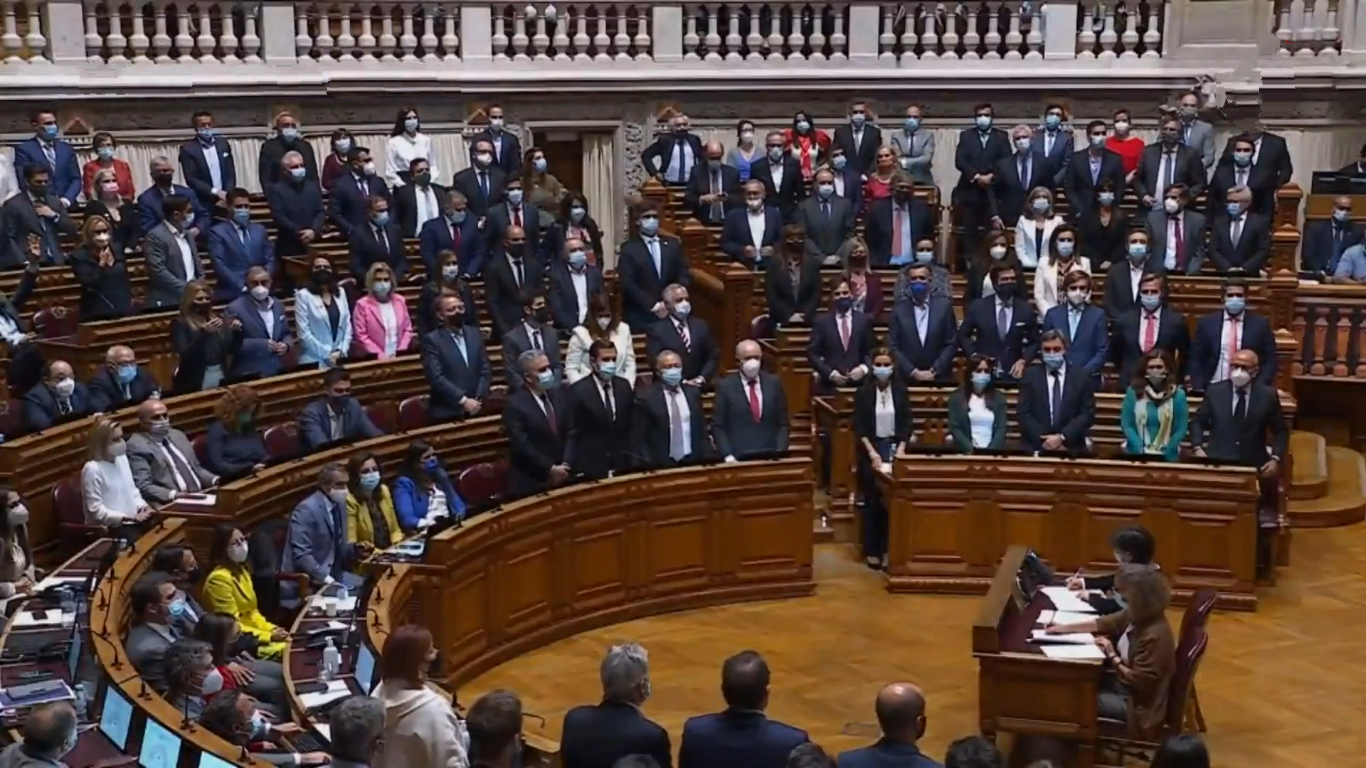
2022 State Budget debate: Opposition MPs voting against.

After the Parliamentary vote, President Marcelo Rebelo de Sousa started hearing parties and convened the Council of State, announcing on 4 November 2021 the dissolution of Parliament and a snap election for 30 January 2022.

=== Leadership changes and challenges ===
==== Liberal Initiative ====
Early in December 2019, the Liberal Initiative (IL) elected a new leader after their previous leader, Carlos Guimarães Pinto, stepped down. Their sole MP, João Cotrim de Figueiredo, was elected as leader with 96 percent of the votes in the party's convention. The results were the following:

Ballot: 8 December 2019
Candidate	Votes	%
João Cotrim de Figueiredo	181	95.8
Blank/Invalid ballots	8	4.2
Turnout	189	
Source: Results

==== Social Democratic Party ====
The Social Democrats (PSD), the largest opposition party, held a two-round leadership election on 11 January and 18 January 2020. Three candidates were in the race: incumbent PSD leader Rui Rio, former PSD parliamentary caucus leader Luís Montenegro and current Deputy Mayor of Cascais Miguel Pinto Luz. Around 40,000 party members, out of almost 110,000, were registered to vote. In the first round, on 11 January, Rui Rio polled ahead with 49 percent of the votes against the 41.4 percent of Luís Montenegro and 9.6 percent of Miguel Pinto Luz, with both Rio and Montenegro qualifying for a second round. A week later, on 18 January, Rui Rio was re-elected as PSD leader with 53.2 percent of the votes, against the 46.8 percent of Luís Montenegro. In both rounds, turnout of registered members achieved almost 80%. The results were the following:

Ballot: 11 and 18 January 2020
Candidate	1st round		2nd round	
Candidate	Votes	%	Votes	%
Rui Rio	15,546	49.0	17,157	53.2
Luís Montenegro	13,137	41.4	15,086	46.8
Miguel Pinto Luz	3,030	9.6		
Blank/Invalid ballots	369	–	341	–
Turnout	32,082	79.01	32,582	80.20
Source: Official results

A leadership election in the PSD was held on 27 November 2021. The original date was 4 December 2021, but the party voted to advance the date in one week. MEP Paulo Rangel was a candidate for the leadership. He faced incumbent PSD leader Rui Rio, who announced his re-election bid on 19 October 2021. Around 46,000 party members, out of more than 85,000 active members, were registered to vote. On 27 November 2021, Rui Rio defeated Paulo Rangel by a 52.4 to 47.6 percent margin and was reelected for a 3rd term as party leader. The results were the following:

Ballot: 27 November 2021
Candidate	Votes	%
Rui Rio	18,852	52.4
Paulo Rangel	17,106	47.6
Blank/Invalid ballots	518	–
Turnout	36,476	78.17
Source: Official results

==== LIVRE ====
The party held a leadership congress between 18 and 19 January 2020. The congress was very tense, being dominated by the political, and also personal, feud between party founder, and de facto leader, Rui Tavares and the party's sole MP Joacine Katar Moreira. Katar Moreira wasn't invited to be part of the contact group (the party's leading organism), and during the congress, she accused the party of "persecuting" her, adding that the party used her, as a black woman, to obtain electoral subsidies. She was also outraged by the party's proposal to expel her. A few days after the congress, the party's leadership assembly approved Katar Moreira's expulsion from the party. The leadership ballot only had one list, headed by Isabel Mendes Lopes and Filipe Honório, and supported by Tavares, which was easily elected.

Ballot: 19 January 2020
Candidate	Votes	%
Isabel Mendes Lopes; Filipe Honório	95	86.4
Blank/Invalid ballots	15	13.6
Turnout	110	

Rui Tavares would ultimately be LIVRE's leading candidate during the legislative election campaign.

==== CDS – People's Party ====
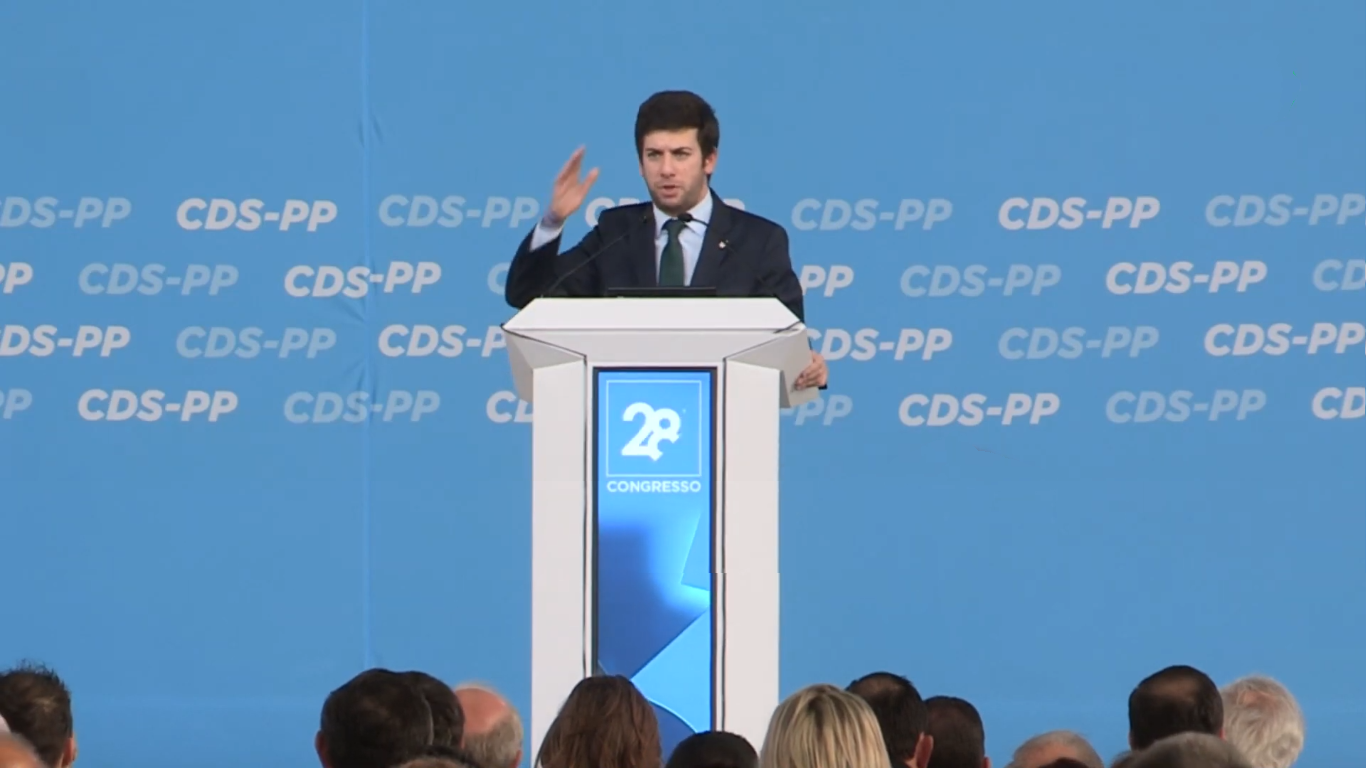
Francisco Rodrigues dos Santos addressing the 28th Congress of CDS–PP in Aveiro.

CDS – People's Party also elected a new leader after former leader Assunção Cristas stepped down after the party's worst result ever in a general election in the 2019 elections. Five candidates were in the race: People's Youth leader Francisco Rodrigues dos Santos, current CDS MP from Aveiro João Almeida, former MP Filipe Lobo d'Ávila, Abel Matos Santos and Carlos Meira. The new leader was elected in a party congress between 25 and 26 January 2020. In that congress, in Aveiro city, Francisco Rodrigues dos Santos was elected leader with 46.4 percent of the delegates votes, against the 38.9 percent of João Almeida and 14.5 percent of Filipe Lobo d'Ávila. Abel Matos Santos and Carlos Meira withdrew from the race near the end of the congress, but before the vote, they announced their support for Rodrigues dos Santos. The results were the following:

Ballot: 26 January 2020
Candidate	Votes	%
Francisco Rodrigues dos Santos	671	46.5
João Almeida	562	39.0
Filipe Lobo d'Ávila	209	14.5
Blank/Invalid ballots	7	–
Turnout	1,449	
Source: Results

On 26 January 2021, after the 2021 presidential election where André Ventura achieving almost 12% of the votes, former Secretary of State for Tourism Adolfo Mesquita Nunes attempted to call a leadership election in an early congress, declaring that he would be a candidate for the leadership in that congress, citing the survival crisis the party faced. In response, Francisco Rodrigues dos Santos called for a motion of confidence that if rejected, would result in a leadership congress. Rodrigues dos Santos ended up winning, as the motion was passed with 54% of the votes in favor.

Motion ballot: 7 February 2021
Option	Votes	%
Francisco Rodrigues dos Santos	144	54.3
Against	113	42.6
Abstention	8	3.1
Turnout	265	
Source: Observador

Adolfo Mesquita Nunes would abandon CDS–PP a few months later, in October 2021.

==== People-Animals-Nature ====
In March 2021, the People-Animals-Nature (PAN) leader and spokesperson, André Silva, announced he was leaving the leadership of the party to dedicate more time to his family. A party congress to elect a new leader was scheduled for the weekend of 5–6 June 2021. For that leadership congress, only one candidate stepped forward, Inês Sousa Real, the party's parliamentary leader. On 6 June, Inês Sousa Real was elected as leader of PAN with 87.2 percent of the votes in the party's congress in Tomar. The results were the following:

Ballot: 6 June 2021
Candidate	Votes	%
Inês Sousa Real	109	87.2
Blank/Invalid ballots	16	12.8
Turnout	125	
Source: Results

==== Socialist Party ====
Party leader, and also Prime Minister, António Costa faced a challenge from party member Daniel Adrião in the party's 2021 leadership election, just like in 2016 and 2018. There were around 62,000 party members registered to vote, and Costa was easily re-elected as leader with 94% of the votes, with Adrião gathering just 6%:

Ballot: 20 June 2021
Candidate	Votes	%
António Costa	21,888	93.9
Daniel Adrião	1,430	6.1
Blank/Invalid ballots	634	–
Turnout	23,952	~39.00

==== Chega ====
Following a decision by the Constitutional Court, in which the Court ruled that Chega had been illegally administered for more than a year, due to irregularities in the convening of the party's previous congress in September 2020, the party called a snap leadership ballot for 6 November 2021. André Ventura ran for another term as party leader and, for the first and still only time in the party's history, he faced a challenger, Carlos Natal, a party member who was the party's initial candidate in the 2021 local elections for Portimão, but who was removed before the election. Around 20,000 party members were registered to vote, but just 20% cast a ballot. Ventura was re-elected with nearly 95% of the votes, while Natal obtained just 5%. The results were the following:

Ballot: 6 November 2021
Candidate	Votes	%
André Ventura	~3,800	94.8
Carlos Natal	~200	5.2
Turnout	~4,000	~20.00

=== Date ===
Official logo of the election.

Ballot paper for the 2022 legislative elections.

According to the Constitution of Portugal, an election must be called between 14 September and 14 October of the year that the legislature ends but can be called earlier. The election is then called by the president of Portugal, not at the sole request of the prime minister of Portugal, after listening to all of the parties represented in Parliament. The election date must be announced at least 60 days in advance if it is held as the legislature ends, but the election must be held within 55 days if it is called during an ongoing legislature (dissolution of parliament). The election day is the same in all multi-seat constituencies, and should fall on a Sunday or a national holiday. The next legislative election should have taken place no later than 8 October 2023; however, due to the rejection of the 2022 State Budget, during which the left-wing parties joined the right-wing parties and voted against the proposal, a snap election was called for 30 January 2022.

=== Electoral system ===
The Assembly of the Republic has 230 members elected to four-year terms. Governments do not require absolute majority support of the Assembly to hold office, as even if the number of opposers of government is larger than that of the supporters, the number of opposers still needs to be equal or greater than 116 (absolute majority) for both the Government's Programme to be rejected or for a motion of no confidence to be approved.

The number of seats assigned to each constituency depends on the district magnitude. The use of the d'Hondt method makes for a higher effective threshold than certain other allocation methods such as the Hare quota or Sainte-Laguë method, which are more generous to small parties.

The distribution of MPs by constituency was the following:

Constituency	Number of MPs	Map
Lisbon	48	
Porto	40	
Braga	19	
Setúbal	18	
Aveiro	16	
Leiria	10	
Coimbra, Faro and Santarém	9	
Viseu	8	
Madeira and Viana do Castelo	6	
Azores and Vila Real	5	
Castelo Branco	4	
Beja, Bragança, Évora and Guarda	3	
Portalegre, Europe and Outside Europe	2	

=== Voting during COVID-19 ===
In January 2022, Portugal was experiencing rising infection rates as the SARS-CoV-2 Omicron variant had a prevalence of 93% among variants in the country. Because of this situation, thousands of voters were likely to be in isolation on 30 January, election day. To address this situation, the government asked for legal advice regarding the issue from the Portuguese Attorney-General's Office. On 19 January, the government announced that isolated voters would be able to vote on election day and recommended that these voters cast a ballot during the last hour the polls were open, between 6pm and 7pm 30 January.

=== Early voting ===
Voters were also able to vote early, which happened on 23 January, one week before election day. Voters had to register between 16 and 20 January 2022 in order to be eligible to cast an early ballot. By the 20 January deadline, 315,785 voters had requested to vote early, a number well below expectations. On 23 January, 285,848 voters (90.5 percent of voters that requested) cast an early ballot.

== Parties ==
=== Parliamentary factions ===
Before the election, the CDS – People's Party (CDS–PP) was open to the idea of a joint coalition with the Social Democrats (PSD), however, this proposal was rejected by the PSD, a decision that displeased the CDS–PP leadership, and the coalition was only on the ballot in Azores and Madeira. The table below lists the parties represented in the Assembly of the Republic during the 14th legislature (2019–2022) and that also contested the 2022 elections:

Name		Ideology	Political position	Leader	2019 result		Seats at dissolution
Name		Ideology	Political position	Leader	%	Seats	Seats at dissolution
PS	Socialist Party; Partido Socialista	Social democracy	Centre-left	António Costa	36.3%	108 / 230	108 / 230
PPD/PSD	Social Democratic Party (Note: In Madeira, the PSD and the CDS–PP contested the elections in a coalition called Madeira First (Madeira Primeiro). Compared with the combined votes of these two parties in 2019.) (Note: In Azores, the PSD, the CDS–PP, and the People's Monarchist Party (PPM) contested the elections in a coalition called Democratic Alliance (Aliança Democrática). Compared with the combined votes of these three parties in 2019.); Partido Social Democrata	Liberal conservatism	Centre-right	Rui Rio	27.8%	79 / 230	79 / 230
BE	Left Bloc; Bloco de Esquerda	Democratic socialism Left-wing populism	Left-wing to far-left	Catarina Martins	9.5%	19 / 230	19 / 230
PCP	Portuguese Communist Party; Partido Comunista Português	Communism; Marxism–Leninism	Left-wing to far-left	Jerónimo de Sousa	6.3%	10 / 230	10 / 230
PEV	Ecologist Party "The Greens"; Partido Ecologista "Os Verdes"	Eco-socialism; Green politics	Left-wing	Heloísa Apolónia	6.3%	2 / 230	2 / 230
CDS–PP	CDS – People's Party; Centro Democrático e Social – Partido Popular	Conservatism; Christian democracy	Centre-right	Francisco Rodrigues dos Santos	4.2%	5 / 230	5 / 230
PAN	People Animals Nature; Pessoas-Animais-Natureza	Animal welfare Environmentalism	Centre-left	Inês Sousa Real	3.3%	4 / 230	3 / 230
CH	Enough! Chega!	National conservatism Right-wing populism	Right-wing to far-right	André Ventura	1.3%	1 / 230	1 / 230
IL	Liberal Initiative; Iniciativa Liberal	Classical liberalism	Centre-right to right-wing	João Cotrim de Figueiredo	1.3%	1 / 230	1 / 230
L	FREE; LIVRE	Eco-socialism; Pro-Europeanism	Centre-left to left-wing	Collective leadership	1.1%	1 / 230	0 / 230
Ind.	Independent; Independente	Joacine Katar Moreira (expelled from FREE caucus); Cristina Rodrigues (left the People Animals Nature caucus)					2 / 230

==== Seat changes ====
- On 3 February 2020, Livre MP Joacine Katar Moreira announced that she would no longer represent the party, after the party leadership withdrew their confidence in her, thus expelling her, due to deep disagreements between both sides. She remained in Parliament as an Independent.
- On 25 June 2020, People Animals Nature MP Cristina Rodrigues announced she was resigning for her party, after deep disagreements with the party's leadership. She remained in Parliament as an Independent.

=== Non-represented parties ===
The table below lists smaller parties not represented in the Assembly of the Republic that contested the elections in at least one constituency:

Name		Ideology	Political position	Leader	2019 result
Name		Ideology	Political position	Leader	%
A	Alliance; Aliança	Conservative liberalism Social conservatism	Centre-right	Jorge Nuno de Sá	0.8%
PCTP/MRPP	Portuguese Workers' Communist Party; Partido Comunista dos Trabalhadores Portugueses	Marxism-Leninism; Maoism	Far-left	Maria Cidália Guerreiro	0.7%
RIR	React, Include, Recycle; Reagir, Incluir, Reciclar,	Humanism; Pacifism	Syncretic	Vitorino Silva (Tino de Rans)	0.7%
E	Rise Up (Note: In July 2020, the National Renovator Party (PNR) changed its name to Rise Up (E).); Ergue-te	National conservatism Anti-immigration	Far-right	José Pinto Coelho	0.3%
MPT	Earth Party; Partido da Terra	Green conservatism	Centre-right	Pedro Pimenta	0.3%
NC	We, the Citizens! Nós, Cidadãos!	Social liberalism Pro-Europeanism	Centre-right	Joaquim Rocha Afonso	0.2%
ADN	National Democratic Alternative (Note: In September 2021, the Democratic Republican Party (PDR) changed its name to the National Democratic Alternative (ADN).); Alternativa Democrática Nacional	Traditionalism	Centre	Bruno Fialho	0.2%
JPP	Together for the People; Juntos Pelo Povo	Regionalism; Social liberalism	Centre	Élvio Sousa	0.2%
PPM	People's Monarchist Party (Note: PPM list only in Madeira); Partido Popular Monárquico	Monarchism; Conservatism	Right-wing	Gonçalo da Câmara; Pereira	0.2%
PTP	Portuguese Labour Party; Partido Trabalhista Português	Democratic socialism Social democracy	Centre-left to left-wing	Amândio Madaleno	0.2%
MAS	Socialist Alternative Movement; Movimento Alternativa Socialista	Socialism; Trotskyism	Left-wing	Renata Cambra	0.1%
VP	Volt Portugal; Volt Portugal	Social liberalism European federalism	Centre to centre-left	Tiago Matos Gomes	—N/a

=== Rejected ===
A coalition between the People's Monarchist Party (PPM) and the United Party of Retirees and Pensioners (PURP) was rejected by the Constitutional Court because of several irregularities.

Name		Ideology	Political position	Leader	2019 result
Name		Ideology	Political position	Leader	Votes (%)
PPM/PURP	People's Monarchist Party; Partido Popular Monárquico	Monarchism; Conservatism	Right-wing	Gonçalo da Câmara; Pereira	0.2%
PPM/PURP	United Party of Retirees and Pensioners; Partido Unido dos Reformados e Pensionistas	Pensioners' rights Anti-austerity	Big tent	António Mateus Dias; Fernando Loureiro	0.2%

== Campaign period ==
=== Issues ===
The main campaign themes were the COVID-19 pandemic, which imposed limitations to the campaign and also to cast ballots, and its economic recovery, as well as pensions and social security, and the state of public services, mainly health services. The risk of post-election instability, and the possibility of the Social Democrats (PSD) having to negotiate with far-right Chega in the next legislature, were also dominant themes during the campaign.

=== Party slogans ===
Party or alliance	Original slogan	English translation	Refs
PS	« Juntos Seguimos e Conseguimos »	"Together We Continue and Achieve"	
PSD	« Novos horizontes para Portugal »	"New Horizons for Portugal"	
BE	« Razões fortes, compromissos claros »	"Strong Reasons, Clear Commitments"	
CDU	« CDU, Força decisiva » « Ao teu lado todos os dias »	"CDU, the Decisive Force" "By Your Side Every Day"	
CDS–PP	« Pelas mesmas razões de sempre »	"For the Same Reasons As Always"	
PAN	« Agir, Já! »	"Act, Now!"	
CH	« Vamos fazer o sistema tremer »	"Let's Make the System Tremble"	
IL	« Preparados. Liberalizar Portugal » « O liberalismo funciona e faz falta a Portugal »	"Ready. Liberalize Portugal" "Liberalism works and Portugal needs it"	
L	« A alternativa é ser LIVRE »	"The Alternative Is to Be FREE"	

=== Candidates' debates ===
==== With parties represented in Parliament ====
A total of 38 debates were scheduled for these elections. CDU leader, Jerónimo de Sousa, would only attend the debates on the main channels of each of the three main networks, RTP1, SIC and TVI. Therefore, he was absent from the debates in the news channels of the three networks, SIC Notícias, RTP3 and CNN Portugal. Shortly after, the debates between Jerónimo de Sousa and other party leaders on those cable channels, were cancelled, thus reducing the number of debates to 32. On 11 January 2022, the PCP announced that Jerónimo de Sousa would undergo urgent vascular surgery on 12 January and would be out of the campaign trail for 10 days, thus being absent in the debates. João Oliveira substituted him in the debate with PSD leader Rui Rio.

Rádio Observador organised two hour and a half debates with the head candidates for the Porto and Lisbon districts. The Porto debate aired on 11 January and the Lisbon debate aired on 14 January.

2022 Portuguese legislative election debates
Date	Time	Organisers	Moderator(s)	P Present A Absent invitee N Non-invitee S Surrogate									
Date	Time	Organisers	Moderator(s)	PS Costa	PSD Rio	BE Martins	CDU Sousa	CDS–PP Rodrigues dos Santos	PAN Sousa Real	CH Ventura	IL Cotrim de Figueiredo	L Tavares	Refs
2 Jan 2022	8:50PM	RTP1	João Adelino Faria	P	N	N	N	N	N	N	N	P	
2 Jan 2022	10:45PM	SIC Notícias	Rosa de Oliveira Pinto	N	N	P	N	N	N	P	N	N	
3 Jan 2022	9PM	SIC	Clara de Sousa	N	P	N	N	N	N	P	N	N	
3 Jan 2022	~~10PM~~	~~CNN Portugal~~		~~N~~	~~N~~	~~I~~	~~A~~	~~N~~	~~N~~	~~N~~	~~N~~	~~N~~	(Note: Cancelled)
4 Jan 2022	6:30PM	SIC Notícias	Rosa de Oliveira Pinto	N	N	P	N	N	N	N	N	P	
4 Jan 2022	9PM	TVI	Pedro Mourinho	P	N	N	P	N	N	N	N	N	
4 Jan 2022	10PM	RTP3	João Adelino Faria	N	N	N	N	P	P	N	N	N	
5 Jan 2022	6:15PM	RTP3	João Adelino Faria	N	N	N	N	P	N	N	P	N	
5 Jan 2022	9PM	SIC	Clara de Sousa	N	P	P	N	N	N	N	N	N	
5 Jan 2022	10PM	CNN Portugal	João Póvoa Marinheiro	N	N	N	N	N	N	P	N	P	
6 Jan 2022	~~6:30PM~~	~~CNN Portugal~~		~~N~~	~~N~~	~~N~~	~~A~~	~~N~~	~~N~~	~~N~~	~~N~~	~~I~~	
6 Jan 2022	9PM	RTP1	João Adelino Faria	P	N	N	N	N	N	P	N	N	
6 Jan 2022	10PM	SIC Notícias	Rosa de Oliveira Pinto	N	N	P	N	N	N	N	P	N	
7 Jan 2022	6:30PM	SIC Notícias	Rosa de Oliveira Pinto	N	N	N	N	N	P	N	P	N	
7 Jan 2022	9PM	TVI	Sara Pinto	N	P	N	N	P	N	N	N	N	
7 Jan 2022	~~10PM~~	~~RTP3~~		~~N~~	~~N~~	~~N~~	~~A~~	~~N~~	~~N~~	~~I~~	~~N~~	~~N~~	
8 Jan 2022	8:40PM	RTP1	João Adelino Faria	N	P	N	N	N	N	N	N	P	
8 Jan 2022	9:10PM	TVI	Sara Pinto	P	N	N	N	N	P	N	N	N	
8 Jan 2022	~~11PM~~	~~CNN Portugal~~		~~N~~	~~N~~	~~N~~	~~A~~	~~I~~	~~N~~	~~N~~	~~N~~	~~N~~	
9 Jan 2022	8:40PM	SIC	Clara de Sousa	P	N	N	N	P	N	N	N	N	
9 Jan 2022	10PM	RTP3	João Adelino Faria	N	N	N	N	N	N	P	P	N	
9 Jan 2022	11PM	SIC Notícias	Rosa de Oliveira Pinto	N	N	N	N	N	P	N	N	P	
10 Jan 2022	6:30PM	RTP3	João Adelino Faria	N	N	P	N	N	P	N	N	N	
10 Jan 2022	9PM	SIC	Clara de Sousa	N	P	N	N	N	N	N	P	N	
10 Jan 2022	10PM	CNN Portugal	João Póvoa Marinheiro	N	N	N	N	P	N	N	N	P	
11 Jan 2022	8:20PM	RTP1	João Adelino Faria	P	N	P	N	N	N	N	N	N	
11 Jan 2022	~~10PM~~	~~CNN Portugal~~		~~N~~	~~N~~	~~N~~	~~A~~	~~N~~	~~I~~	~~N~~	~~N~~	~~N~~	
12 Jan 2022	6:30PM	CNN Portugal	João Póvoa Marinheiro	N	N	N	N	P	N	P	N	N	
12 Jan 2022	9PM	SIC	Clara de Sousa	N	P	N	S (Note: Substituted by João Oliveira whilst he is recovering in hospital)	N	N	N	N	N	
12 Jan 2022	10PM	SIC Notícias	Rosa de Oliveira Pinto	N	N	N	N	N	N	N	P	P	
13 Jan 2022	8:30PM	RTP1; SIC; TVI	João Adelino Faria; Clara de Sousa; Sara Pinto	P	P	N	N	N	N	N	N	N	
14 Jan 2022	6:10PM	SIC Notícias	Rosa de Oliveira Pinto	N	N	N	N	N	P	P	N	N	
14 Jan 2022	9PM	TVI	Sara Pinto	P	N	N	N	N	N	N	P	N	
14 Jan 2022	10PM	RTP3	João Adelino Faria	N	N	P	N	P	N	N	N	N	
15 Jan 2022	8:50PM	RTP1	João Adelino Faria	N	P	N	N	N	P	N	N	N	
15 Jan 2022	~~10PM~~	~~RTP3~~		~~N~~	~~N~~	~~N~~	~~A~~	~~N~~	~~N~~	~~N~~	~~I~~	~~N~~	
17 Jan 2022	9PM	RTP1	Carlos Daniel	P	P	P	S	P	P	P	P	P	
20 Jan 2022	9AM	Antena 1 RR; TSF	Natália Carvalho; Susana Martins; Judith Menezes e Sousa	P	A	P	S	P	P	A	P	P	
Candidate viewed as "most convincing" in each debate
Date	Time	Organisers	Polling firm/Link										
Date	Time	Organisers	Polling firm/Link	PS	PSD	BE	CDU	CDS–PP	PAN	CH	IL	L	Notes
13 Jan 2022	8:30PM	RTP1, SIC, TVI	Pitagórica	38.0	42.0	—N/a	—N/a	—N/a	—N/a	—N/a	—N/a	—N/a	20.0% Tie
13 Jan 2022	8:30PM	RTP1, SIC, TVI	Aximage	42	39	—N/a	—N/a	—N/a	—N/a	—N/a	—N/a	—N/a	19% None

==== With parties not represented in Parliament ====
A debate between parties not represented in Parliament was also held on RTP1.

2022 Portuguese legislative election debates
Date	Time	Organisers	Moderator(s)	P Present A Absent invitee N Non-invitee S Surrogate											
Date	Time	Organisers	Moderator(s)	A Sá	PCTP Guerreiro	RIR Rans	E Coelho	MPT Pimenta	NC Afonso	ADN Fialho	JPP Sousa	PTP Madaleno	MAS Cambra	VP Gomes	Refs
18 Jan 2022	9:00PM	RTP1	Carlos Daniel	P	P	P	P	P	P	P	P	P	P	P	

== Opinion polling ==
Local Regression of polls conducted since the election

== Voter turnout ==
The table below shows voter turnout throughout election day including voters from Overseas.

Turnout	Time								
Turnout	12:00			16:00			19:00		
Turnout	2019	2022	±	2019	2022	±	2019	2022	±
Total	18.83%	23.27%	▲4.44 pp	38.59%	45.66%	▲7.07 pp	48.60%	51.46%	▲2.86 pp

== Results ==
=== National summary ===
Party or alliance		Votes	%	+/–	Seats	+/–
Socialist Party		2,302,601	41.38	+5.03	120	+12
Social Democratic Party	Social Democratic Party (Note: Only in mainland Portugal and overseas constituencies.)	1,539,415	27.66	+1.30	72	–2
Social Democratic Party	Madeira First	50,636	0.91	–0.16	3	0
Social Democratic Party	Democratic Alliance	28,330	0.51	+0.06	2	0
Social Democratic Party	Total	1,618,381	29.08	+1.31	77	–2
Chega		399,659	7.18	+5.89	12	+11
Liberal Initiative		273,687	4.92	+3.63	8	+7
Left Bloc		244,603	4.40	–5.12	5	–14
Unitary Democratic Coalition		238,920	4.29	–2.05	6	–6
CDS – People's Party		89,181	1.60	–2.62	0	–5
People Animals Nature		88,152	1.58	–1.74	1	–3
LIVRE		71,232	1.28	+0.19	1	0
React, Include, Recycle		23,233	0.42	–0.25	0	0
Portuguese Workers' Communist Party		11,265	0.20	–0.49	0	0
National Democratic Alternative		10,874	0.20	–0.02	0	0
Together for the People		10,786	0.19	–0.01	0	0
Earth Party		7,561	0.14	–0.11	0	0
Volt Portugal		6,240	0.11	New	0	New
Socialist Alternative Movement		6,157	0.11	+0.05	0	0
Rise Up		5,043	0.09	–0.23	0	0
We, the Citizens!		3,880	0.07	–0.17	0	0
Portuguese Labour Party		3,533	0.06	–0.1	0	0
Alliance		2,467	0.04	–0.73	0	0
People's Monarchist Party		260	0.00	–0.16	0	0
Total		5,417,715	100.00	–	230	0
Valid votes		5,417,715	97.36	+2.23		
Invalid votes		83,721	1.50	–0.86		
Blank votes		63,103	1.13	–1.38		
Total votes		5,564,539	100.00	–		
Registered voters/turnout		10,813,246	51.46	+2.86		
Source: Comissão Nacional de Eleições

Vote share
PS	41.38%
PSD	27.66%
CH	7.18%
IL	4.92%
BE	4.40%
CDU	4.29%
CDS-PP	1.60%
PAN	1.58%
L	1.28%
MF	0.91%
AD	0.51%
Others	1.66%
Blank/Invalid	2.63%

Parliamentary seats
PS	52.17%
PSD	31.30%
CH	5.22%
IL	3.48%
CDU	2.61%
BE	2.17%
MF	1.30%
AD	0.87%
PAN	0.43%
L	0.43%

=== Distribution by constituency ===
Results of the 2022 election of the Portuguese Assembly of the Republic by constituency
Constituency	%	S	%	S	%	S	%	S	%	S	%	S	%	S	%	S	%	S	%	S	Total S
Constituency	PS		PSD		CH		IL		CDU		BE		MF		AD		PAN		L		Total S
Azores	42.8	3			5.9	-	4.1	-	1.5	-	4.3	-			33.9	2	1.4	-	0.9	-	5
Aveiro	39.5	8	35.7	7	5.6	1	4.5	-	1.8	-	4.6	-					1.3	-	0.8	-	16
Beja	43.7	2	15.9	-	10.3	-	2.1	-	18.4	1	3.7	-					0.9	-	0.7	-	3
Braga	42.0	9	34.8	8	5.8	1	4.3	1	2.6	-	3.7	-					1.2	-	0.8	-	19
Bragança	40.3	2	40.3	1	8.6	-	1.6	-	1.4	-	2.1	-					0.6	-	0.4	-	3
Castelo Branco	47.7	3	27.4	1	8.3	-	2.6	-	2.9	-	4.3	-					1.0	-	0.8	-	4
Coimbra	45.2	6	29.1	3	6.1	-	3.6	-	3.4	-	5.1	-					1.2	-	1.0	-	9
Évora	44.0	2	21.4	1	9.2	-	2.5	-	14.6	-	3.3	-					0.8	-	0.6	-	3
Faro	39.9	5	24.4	3	12.3	1	4.6	-	4.8	-	5.8	-					2.2	-	1.1	-	9
Guarda	45.1	2	33.5	1	8.0	-	1.9	-	1.8	-	3.1	-					0.7	-	0.5	-	3
Leiria	35.7	5	34.7	4	8.0	1	5.3	-	3.1	-	4.5	-					1.3	-	1.1	-	10
Lisbon	40.8	21	24.2	13	7.8	4	7.9	4	5.1	2	4.7	2					2.0	1	2.4	1	48
Madeira	31.5	3			6.1	-	3.3	-	2.0	-	3.2	-	39.8	3			1.6	-	0.7	-	6
Portalegre	47.2	2	23.2	-	11.5	-	2.1	-	7.6	-	2.9	-					0.6	-	0.6	-	2
Porto	42.5	19	32.3	14	4.4	2	5.1	2	3.3	1	4.8	2					1.7	-	1.2	-	40
Santarém	41.2	5	26.9	3	10.9	1	3.8	-	5.4	-	4.6	-					1.2	-	0.9	-	9
Setúbal	45.7	10	16.2	3	9.0	1	5.1	1	10.1	2	5.8	1					2.0	-	1.4	-	18
Viana do Castelo	42.1	3	34.2	3	6.1	-	2.9	-	3.0	-	3.5	-					1.0	-	0.7	-	6
Vila Real	41.3	3	40.0	2	7.2	-	1.8	-	1.7	-	2.3	-					0.8	-	0.6	-	5
Viseu	41.5	4	36.8	4	7.8	-	2.5	-	1.6	-	2.8	-					0.9	-	0.6	-	8
Europe (Note: Original election annulled by the Constitutional Court. A rerun was conducted during March 2022.)	33.0	2	15.0	-	7.1	-	2.5	-	1.3	-	2.4	-					2.7	-	1.4	-	2
Outside Europe	29.8	1	37.5	1	9.6	-	3.6	-	1.4	-	2.6	-					4.5	-	1.0	-	2
Total	41.4	120	27.7	72	7.2	12	4.9	8	4.3	6	4.4	5	0.9	3	0.5	2	1.6	1	1.3	1	230
Source: Election Results

=== Maps ===
Full results by electoral district

Strongest party by district

Strongest party by municipality

Share of the Socialist Party (PS) by municipality

Share of the Social Democratic Party (PSD) by municipality

Share of Chega (CH) by municipality

Share of the Liberal Initiative (IL) by municipality

Share of the Left Bloc (BE) by municipality

Share of the Unitary Democratic Coalition (CDU) by municipality

Share of the CDS-People's Party (CDS-PP) by municipality

Share of the People-Animals-Nature (PAN) by municipality

Share of the Livre (L) by municipality

=== Electorate ===
Demographic	Size	PS	PSD	CH	IL	BE	CDU	Others
Total vote	100%	41%	29%	7%	5%	4%	4%	10%
Sex
Men	48%	38%	30%	10%	6%	5%	4%	7%
Women	52%	46%	28%	5%	4%	5%	4%	8%
Age
18–24 years old	9%	27%	29%	7%	12%	8%	4%	13%
25–34 years old	12%	30%	26%	10%	10%	5%	4%	15%
35–54 years old	39%	39%	30%	9%	5%	4%	4%	9%
55 years and older	39%	51%	28%	5%	2%	3%	5%	6%
Age by sex
Men, 18–34 years old	11%	23%	30%	12%	14%	5%	4%	12%
Women, 18–34 years old	11%	34%	25%	5%	8%	8%	4%	16%
Men, 35–54 years old	18%	34%	32%	12%	6%	4%	5%	7%
Women, 35–54 years old	21%	44%	29%	6%	4%	4%	4%	9%
Men, 55 years and older	20%	48%	29%	6%	2%	4%	6%	5%
Women, 55 years and older	20%	55%	28%	4%	1%	3%	4%	5%
Education
No High-school	31%	55%	23%	7%	1%	3%	5%	6%
High-school	34%	39%	28%	10%	5%	5%	5%	8%
College graduate	35%	31%	36%	5%	9%	6%	4%	9%
Education by sex
Men, No High-school	17%	50%	24%	9%	1%	4%	6%	6%
Women, No High-school	16%	60%	22%	5%	1%	2%	4%	6%
Men, High-school	17%	34%	29%	14%	6%	5%	5%	7%
Women, High-school	17%	45%	26%	7%	4%	5%	4%	9%
Men, college graduate	14%	26%	38%	7%	13%	5%	4%	7%
Women, college graduate	19%	35%	34%	3%	7%	7%	4%	10%
Education by age
18–34 years old, No High-school	1%	42%	19%	15%	4%	4%	6%	10%
35–54 years old, No High-school	8%	49%	23%	12%	2%	3%	4%	7%
55 years and older, No High-school	23%	59%	23%	5%	1%	3%	5%	4%
18–34 years old, High-school	10%	31%	25%	11%	9%	6%	4%	14%
35–54 years old, High-school	15%	42%	27%	12%	4%	5%	5%	5%
55 years and older, High-school	9%	46%	32%	7%	2%	4%	5%	4%
18–34 years old, college graduate	11%	25%	31%	5%	15%	8%	4%	12%
35–54 years old, college graduate	16%	33%	37%	5%	8%	5%	4%	8%
55 years and older, college graduate	7%	36%	40%	5%	4%	5%	5%	5%
Source: Pitagórica exit poll

== Aftermath and reactions ==
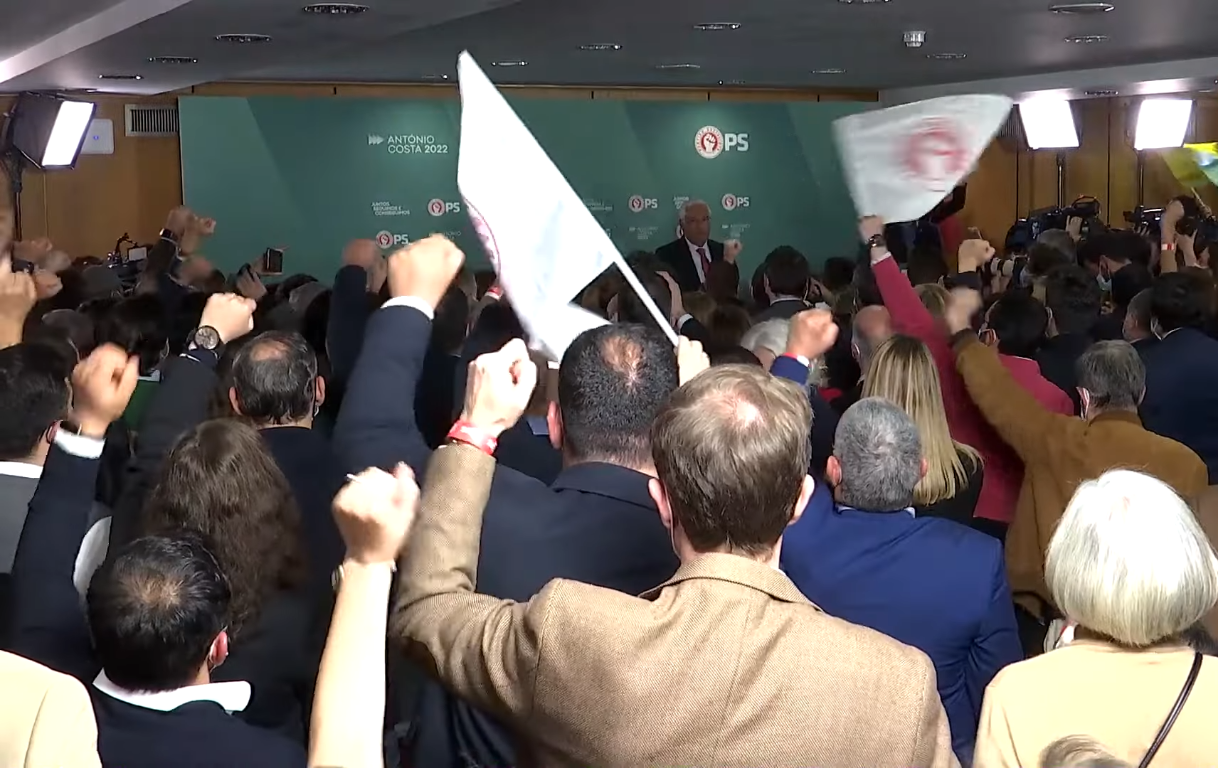
Prime Minister António Costa giving his victory speech on election night.

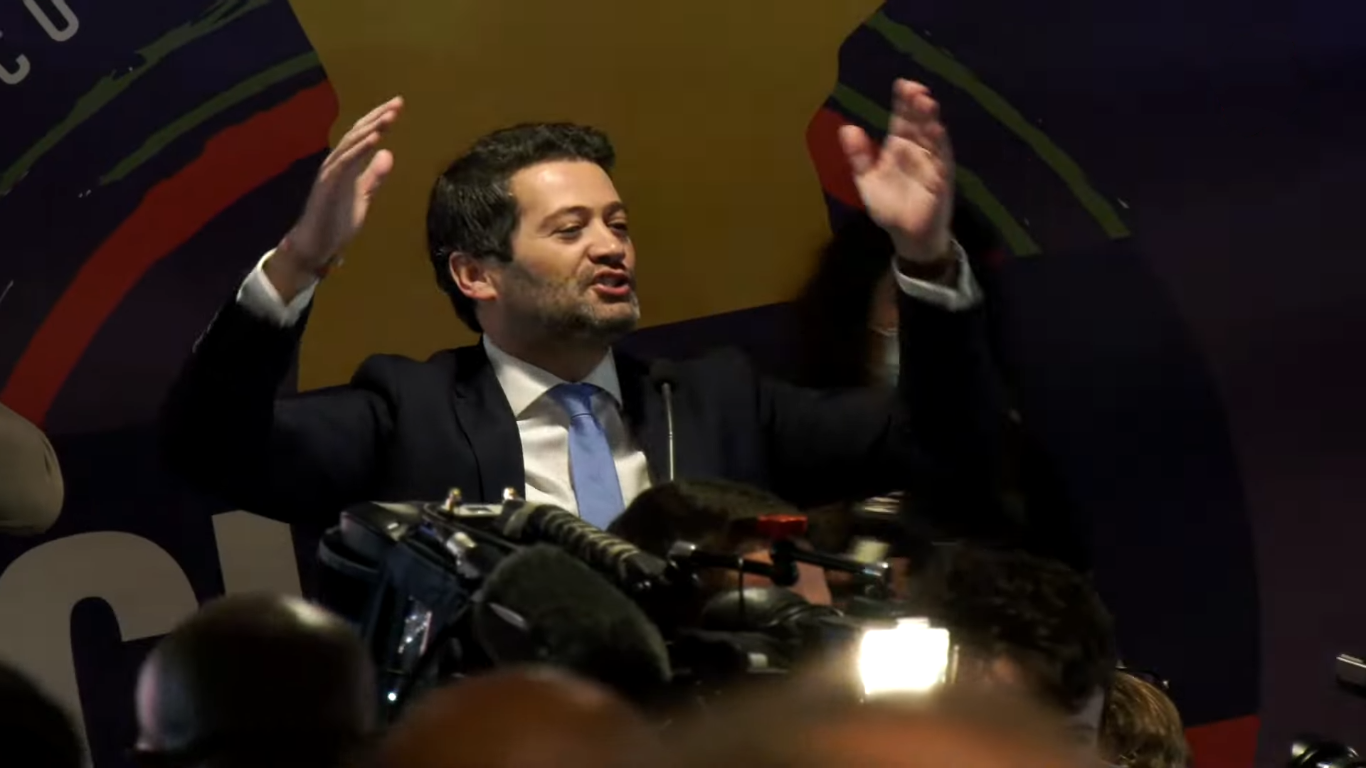
Chega leader, André Ventura, speaking during election night after his party became the third largest party in the elections.

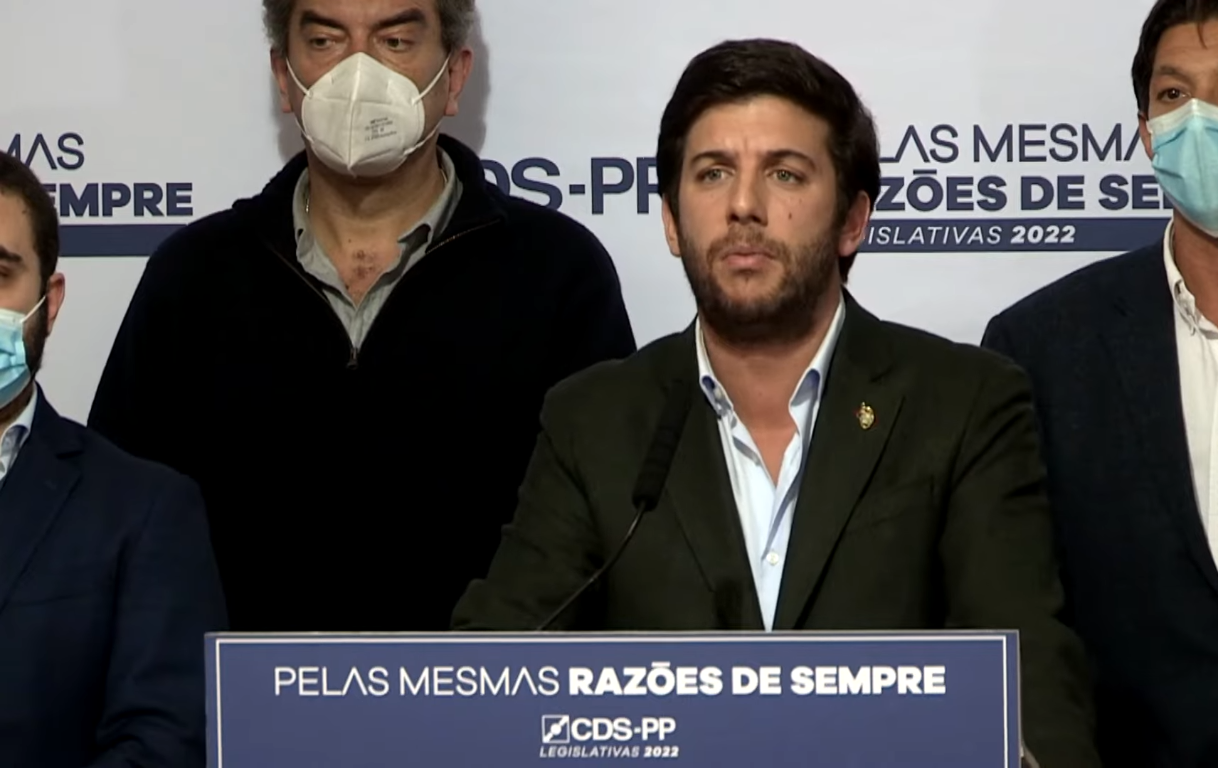
CDS – People's Party leader, Francisco Rodrigues dos Santos, reacting after his party was wiped out from Parliament for the first time in democracy.

Following the Socialist Party's (PS) unexpected absolute majority, Costa said that his majority "wouldn't mean absolute power" and that he would still be open to forming a coalition, despite it not being a requirement to govern. He also promised reforms, saying: "The conditions have been created to carry out investments and reforms for Portugal to be more prosperous, fairer, more innovative." The Social Democratic Party's (PSD) weak results led party leader Rui Rio to announce his resignation from the leadership, acknowledging he was no longer "useful" for both the party and the country.

Chega party leader André Ventura reacted to his party third place finish calling it a "great night", blaming the PS majority on Rui Rio, and stating: "From now on there won't be a soft opposition. We will assume the role of being the real opposition to the Socialists and restore dignity to this country." IL leader João Cotrim de Figueiredo also celebrated sufficient gains to form a parliamentary group, and said that his party would be a "firm opposition to socialism".

Both BE and CDU suffered losses, with BE leader Catarina Martins faulting the PS for having created a "false crisis" that she believed had resulted in a polarised election that penalised parties to the left of the PS. She also spoke out against the gains for Chega. Portuguese Communist Party leader Jerónimo de Sousa made similar statements about the PS.

With the CDS – People's Party (CDS–PP) losing all its parliamentary representation for the first time, party leader Francisco Rodrigues dos Santos announced his resignation, saying the results "left no room for doubt" that he "no longer has the conditions to lead the CDS". Also due to tactical voting, People Animals Nature (PAN) suffered losses, and party leader Inês Sousa Real spoke of sadness after this result, and said that an absolute majority would be bad for democracy. After maintaining LIVRE's sole seat, party leader Rui Tavares pledged to get Costa to work with other left-wing parties and that the party will be "the representatives of the European green left in Portugal".

=== International reactions ===
- EU: The European Commission's First Vice-president Frans Timmermans congratulated Costa's victory on Twitter as "an important victory for Portugal and Europe."
- Spain: Spanish prime minister Pedro Sánchez, leader of the Spanish Socialist Workers' Party, congratulated Costa on Twitter, stating that "Portugal has once again opted for a social democratic project that combines growth and social justice. Together we will continue to promote in our countries and in Europe a socialist response to the challenges we share."
- UK: Keir Starmer, the British opposition and Labour Party leader, congratulated Costa on Twitter for "a victory for seriousness in government, shared prosperity and social justice."
- India: Indian prime minister Narendra Modi congratulated Costa, who is Luso-Indian, on Twitter "for resounding performance in the parliamentary elections in Portugal and his re-election." He also stated: "Look forward to continue deepening the warm and time-tested relationship with Portugal."
- Brazil: Luiz Inácio Lula da Silva, then former president of Brazil and presidential pre-candidate in the 2022 Brazilian general election, congratulated Costa and his party for "their great electoral victory in Portugal", wishing them "good luck".

=== Overseas ballots controversy ===
In this election, 257,791 ballots from overseas were received, but, during the process of counting the ballots, a controversy started. The Social Democratic Party (PSD) filed a complaint in order for the ballots with no ID card copy to be put aside. The Portuguese electoral law requires that for a ballot received by mail to be valid, it needs to be accompanied with an ID card copy of the voter (in order to confirm the identity of the voter, as the equivalent of presenting the ID to the poll workers when voting in person). The Socialist Party (PS) protested against the PSD complaint, reminding the PSD that all parties had had an informal meeting in which it had been decided that all ballots, with or without an ID card copy, would be counted and declared valid. The PSD had confirmed their position in that meeting, but announced that they had changed their mind after they were given a document stating that any such actions would be illegal. Nonetheless, the PSD and the Electoral Commission (CNE) warned and advised counting staffs to separate the ballots. But this guideline wasn't followed by several counting staffs, and by the end of the counting of ballots, 80.32% of the Europe constituency ballots, 157,205 ballots out from a total of 195,701, were considered invalid and thrown out. Several parties (Volt, LIVRE, PAN, Chega, MAS) appealed to the Constitutional Court in order to have the ballots counted. Of the 5 complaints filed, however, the court accepted only Volt Portugal's complaint. On 15 February, the Court annulled the election in the Europe constituency and demanded a repetition of the vote. The National Election Committee determined that for the rerun of the parliamentary elections in the constituency of Europe on March 12 and 13 can be voted in person, just as until March 23 by absentee ballot. 109,350 ballots were received until 23 March, and of those, 30% (32,777) were declared null as they were not accompanied with an ID card copy. In terms of results, the PS was able to win the two seats from the Europe constituency, unlike in the original election when the PS and PSD both won one seat.

=== Fall of the government ===
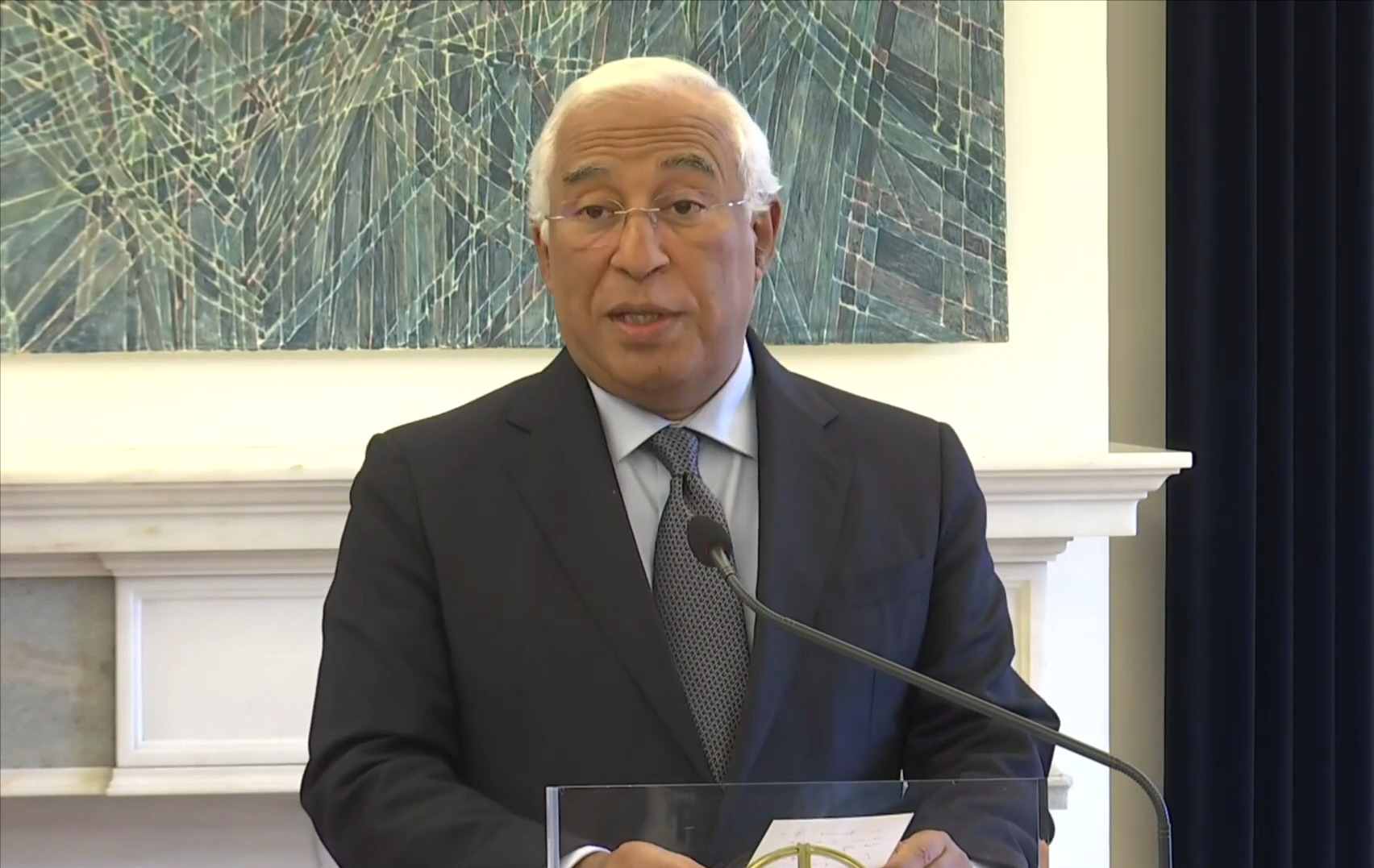
António Costa announcing his resignation on 7 November 2023.

On 7 November 2023, the Police and several agents of the Public Prosecutor's office conducted a series of searches to the official residency of the Prime Minister, ministries, and other sites that culminated in the arrest of several people including the chief of staff of the Prime Minister. António Costa himself was also indicted as a suspect in a case of corruption involving the lithium and hydrogen businesses. Shortly after this revelation by the Public Prosecutor's office, Prime Minister António Costa tendered his resignation to President Marcelo Rebelo de Sousa and also announced he was stepping down from the PS leadership.

After this, the President heard all parties and met with the Council of State. On 9 November 2023, President Marcelo Rebelo de Sousa called a snap legislative election for 10 March 2024. For the first time ever in Portuguese democracy, a single party majority government didn't complete its full term.

== See also ==
- Elections in Portugal
- List of political parties in Portugal
- Politics of Portugal
