= Opinion polling for the 2022 Portuguese legislative election =

In the run up to the 2022 Portuguese legislative election, various organisations carry out opinion polling to gauge voting intention in Portugal. Results of such polls are displayed in this article. The date range for these opinion polls are from the 2019 Portuguese legislative election, held on 6 October, to the day the next election was held on 30 January.

== Nationwide polling ==
=== Graphical summary ===
Local Regression of polls conducted since the election

=== Polling ===
Poll results are listed in the table below in reverse chronological order, showing the most recent first. The highest percentage figure in each polling survey is displayed in bold, and the background shaded in the leading party's colour. In the instance that there is a tie, then no figure is shaded but both are displayed in bold. The lead column on the right shows the percentage-point difference between the two parties with the highest figures. Poll results use the date the survey's fieldwork was done, as opposed to the date of publication.

Exit poll

Polling firm/Link	Fieldwork date	Sample size	Turnout	PS	PSD	BE	CDU	CDS–PP	PAN	CH	IL	L	O	Lead
**2022 legislative election**	30 Jan 2022	—N/a	51.5	**41.4**; 120	29.1; 77	4.4; 5	4.3; 6	1.6; 0	1.6; 1	7.2; 12	4.9; 8	1.3; 1	4.2; 0	**12.3**
UCP–CESOP	30 Jan 2022	27,615	46–51	**37–42**; 102/116	30–35; 84/94	3–6; 3/7	3–5; 3/7	1–3; 0/2	1–3; 0/2	5–8; 7/13	4–7; 5/9	1–3; 1/2		7
ICS/ISCTE–GFK/Metris	30 Jan 2022	18,361	51–55	**37.4–** **41.4**; 106/118	26.9– 30.9; 75/85	3.0– 6.0; 4/10	3.0– 6.0; 3/9	0.6– 2.6; 1/3	0.5– 3.1; 1/3	5.0– 8.0; 8/14	4.7– 7.7; 9/15	0.4– 2.4; 1/2	3.5– 6.5; 0	10.5
Intercampus	30 Jan 2022	23,848	?	**36.6–** **42.6**; 108/120	26.7– 32.7; 77/89	2.4– 6.4; 4/10	2.5– 6.5; 3/9	0.1– 3.6; 0/3	0.2– 3.7; 0/4	3.8– 7.8; 6/12	3.5– 7.5; 6/12	0.2– 2.6; 0/2		9.9
Pitagórica	30 Jan 2022	33,157	56–60	**37.5–** **42.5**; 100/117	26.7– 31.7; 75/95	3.0– 7.0; 4/8	2.5– 6.5; 4/8	0.9– 2.9; 1/2	0.8– 2.8; 1/2	4.5– 8.5; 6/13	4.5– 8.5; 7/11	0.7– 3.7; 0/1		10.8
Pitagórica (Note: Tracking Poll)	24–28 Jan 2022	760	?	**36.6**; 98/113	32.9; 82/100	5.1; 5/13	5.2; 5/14	1.4; 1/5	1.2; 1/2	5.4; 2/8	5.2; 2/5	1.7; 1/3	5.4	3.7
Pitagórica	23–26 Jan 2022	608	?	**36.7**	31.3	6.1	5.7	2.1	1.0	5.1	4.3	1.8	6.1	5.4
CESOP–UCP	19–26 Jan 2022	2,192	?	**36**; 95/105	33; 89/99	6; 6/13	5; 4/10	2; 0/2	2; 1/2	6; 7/9	6; 5/10	2; 1/2	2; 0	3
Pitagórica	22–25 Jan 2022	608	?	**36.6**	30.9	6.7	4.2	1.8	1.0	6.7	3.8	1.6	6.7	5.7
Pitagórica	21–24 Jan 2022	608	?	**36.7**	31.4	5.7	4.3	1.4	1.8	7.5	3.2	1.0	6.9	5.3
ICS/ISCTE	18–24 Jan 2022	1,003	?	**35**; 92/106	33; 87/101	5; 4/10	6; 6/12	1; 0/1	2; 1/3	6; 6/12	6; 7/13	1; 1	5; 0	2
Pitagórica	20–23 Jan 2022	608	?	**35.3**	31.4	6.1	4.9	1.6	1.6	6.9	4.7	0.8	6.5	3.9
Pitagórica	19–22 Jan 2022	608	?	**34.1**	33.5	5.5	5.1	0.8	1.6	6.6	5.3	1.2	6.2	0.6
Pitagórica	18–21 Jan 2022	608	?	33.5	**34.5**	5.7	4.7	0.8	1.6	6.5	5.7	1.2	5.9	1.0
Aximage	16–21 Jan 2022	965	?	33.8	**34.4**	6.6	4.5	1.6	3.2	8.0	2.8	1.4	3.7	0.6
Pitagórica	17–20 Jan 2022	608	?	**34.6**	33.5	4.9	4.5	1.2	1.6	6.3	6.3	1.6	5.3	1.1
Pitagórica	16–19 Jan 2022	608	?	**36.5**	32.9	5.0	5.0	1.0	1.9	6.3	5.2	1.5	4.7	3.6
Pitagórica	15–18 Jan 2022	608	?	**38.7**	30.4	5.1	5.3	1.1	1.7	7.2	4.7	1.1	4.7	8.3
CESOP–UCP	12–18 Jan 2022	1,456	?	**37**; 99/110	33; 89/100	5; 5/8	5; 5/9	2; 0/2	2; 1/2	6; 7/9	5; 4/6	2; 1/2	3	4
Metris (Note: Results presented here exclude undecideds/refuse to answer or vote (24.1%). With their inclusion results are: PS: 29.8%; PSD: 24.8%; CH: 5.2%; CDU: 4.1%; BE: 3.8%; IL: 3.3%; PAN: 0.9%; CDS-PP: 0.7%; Livre: 0.5%; Others/Invalid: 3.0%.)	11–18 Jan 2022	812	?	**39.2**	32.6	5.0	5.4	1.0	1.1	6.8	4.4	0.6	3.9	6.6
Pitagórica	14–17 Jan 2022	608	?	**39.8**	30.4	4.5	5.8	1.3	1.7	7.5	4.3	1.5	3.2	9.4
Pitagórica	13–16 Jan 2022	608	?	**40.1**	28.8	5.9	5.9	0.6	1.5	8.0	5.0	1.3	2.9	11.3
Pitagórica	12–15 Jan 2022	608	?	**39.6**	29.6	6.0	5.1	0.9	1.7	8.1	4.7	1.5	2.8	10.0
Pitagórica	11–14 Jan 2022	608	?	**38.8**	29.3	6.8	4.6	1.3	1.9	7.8	4.9	1.5	3.1	9.5
Pitagórica	10–13 Jan 2022	608	?	**38.9**	29.7	6.2	4.6	1.7	2.1	6.9	5.4	1.2	3.3	9.2
Aximage	6–12 Jan 2022	807	?	**38.1**	28.5	7.4	4.8	1.8	2.1	9.0	3.7	–	4.6	9.6
CESOP–UCP	6–10 Jan 2022	1,246	?	**39**; 104/113	30; 81/89	6; 8/12	5; 4/10	2; 0/2	3; 2/4	6; 6/12	4; 3/7	2; 1	3	9
Intercampus (Note: Results presented here exclude undecideds (17.8%). With their inclusion results are: PS: 29.0%; PSD: 24.1%; BE: 7.0%; CH: 5.8%; CDU: 4.9%; IL: 4.6%; PAN: 3.5%; CDS-PP: 0.9%; Livre: 0.5%; Others/Invalid: 1.9%.)	4–10 Jan 2022	615	?	**35.3**	29.3	8.5	6.0	1.1	4.3	7.1	5.6	0.6	2.2	6.0
Pitagórica	30 Dec 2021–9 Jan 2022	600	?	**39.6**	30.0	6.4	5.1	1.5	1.8	5.7	5.1	–	4.8	9.6
CESOP–UCP	28 Dec 2021–5 Jan 2022	1,238	?	**38**	32	6	6	2	2	5	5	1	3	6
ICS/ISCTE	10–20 Dec 2021	901	?	**38**	31	5	6	2	2	7	4	–	5	7
Intercampus (Note: Results presented here exclude undecideds (17.1%). With their inclusion results are: PS: 29.4%; PSD: 22.2%; CH: 7.4%; BE: 5.5%; IL: 5.3%; CDU: 3.7%; PAN: 2.9%; CDS-PP: 1.3%; Livre: 0.7%; Others/Invalid: 4.4%.)	7–14 Dec 2021	603	?	**35.5**	26.8	6.6	4.5	1.6	3.5	8.9	6.4	0.8	5.3	8.7
Aximage	9–13 Dec 2021	810	55.1	**35.4**	33.2	7.3	5.1	1.3	2.5	6.2	3.7	–	5.3	2.2
Pitagórica	7–12 Dec 2021	625	?	**37.0**	31.7	4.9	5.9	1.0	3.0	6.3	5.9	–	4.3	5.3
Pitagórica	10–15 Nov 2021	625	?	**38.2**	32.1	5.4	5.2	0.8	1.9	7.1	4.2	–	5.1	6.1
Intercampus	5–11 Nov 2021	612	?	**39.0**	28.1	7.7	5.3	2.0	4.4	6.3	4.2	0.2	2.8	10.9
CESOP–UCP	29 Oct–4 Nov 2021	878	?	**39**	30	7	5	2	3	5	5	–	4	9
ICS/ISCTE	21 Oct–1 Nov 2021	800	?	**40**	26	5	6	1	2	10	2	–	8	14
Aximage	28–31 Oct 2021	803	?	**38.5**	24.4	8.8	4.6	2.0	2.8	7.7	4.7	–	6.4	14.1
Eurosondagem	18–21 Oct 2021	1,028	?	**38.1**	27.5	5.1	5.6	2.5	2.8	9.2	5.5	–	3.7	10.6
**2021 local elections**	26 Sep 2021	—N/a	53.6	**37.1** (105)	32.1 (93)	2.9 (4)	8.2 (19)	1.9 (1)	1.1 (1)	4.2 (5)	1.3 (1)	0.5 (1)	10.7 (0)	**5.0**
Eurosondagem	20–23 Sep 2021	1,032	?	**41.5**	27.2	5.0	5.5	2.0	2.6	8.9	5.2	–	2.1	14.3
Intercampus	14–23 Sep 2021	609	?	**36.8**	24.6	9.7	5.5	1.4	3.3	8.6	5.5	0.4	4.2	12.2
Pitagórica	10–19 Sep 2021	609	?	**41.3**	25.1	7.1	5.5	2.0	1.8	7.1	4.7	0.4	5.0	16.2
Intercampus	13–20 Aug 2021	612	?	**34.7**	25.1	9.1	5.4	1.6	3.5	7.5	6.1	0.2	6.8	9.6
Eurosondagem	16–19 Aug 2021	1,052	?	**41.3**	27.3	5.6	6.0	2.1	2.5	9.0	4.5	–	1.7	14.0
Eurosondagem	26–29 Jul 2021	1,025	?	**41.1**	27.3	4.8	5.9	2.1	2.2	8.8	3.3	–	4.5	13.8
Intercampus	7–16 Jul 2021	607	?	**34.8**	23.4	9.0	6.7	2.8	4.5	9.0	3.1	0.6	6.1	11.4
Aximage	10–12 Jul 2021	763	?	**37.6**	25.2	7.8	4.8	0.9	4.6	7.7	5.5	–	5.9	12.4
Eurosondagem	5–8 Jul 2021	1,022	?	**40.8**	27.3	5.2	5.2	2.2	2.1	9.0	2.5	–	5.7	13.5
Intercampus	8–16 Jun 2021	608	?	**34.6**	22.4	8.9	6.0	3.1	5.2	10.1	6.4	0.6	2.7	12.2
Eurosondagem	31 May–3 Jun 2021	1,021	?	**40.0**	27.2	5.5	5.0	2.5	2.2	8.4	2.7	–	6.5	12.8
Aximage	26–30 May 2021	796	?	**38.9**	24.0	8.0	5.7	1.4	3.7	7.0	5.2	0.3	5.8	14.9
Domp (Note: Results presented here exclude undecideds, non voters and non responsive (14.3% + 5.7% + 10.2%). With their inclusion results are: PS: 24.5%; PSD: 15.1%; CH: 7.5%; BE: 6.0%; PAN: 3.7%; CDU: 3.1%; IL: 2.5%; CDS-PP: 1.6%; Livre: 0.4%; Others/Invalid: 5.3%.)	9 Apr–19 May 2021	1,156	?	**35.1**	21.7	8.6	4.4	2.4	5.3	10.8	3.6	0.6	7.6	13.4
Eurosondagem	10–13 May 2021	1,008	?	**39.4**	27.4	6.6	5.0	2.5	2.4	8.0	2.2	–	6.5	12.0
Intercampus	5–11 May 2021	611	?	**37.9**	21.7	8.3	5.5	2.9	4.8	8.3	4.2	1.3	5.1	16.2
CESOP–UCP	3–7 May 2021	1,123	?	**38**	28	8	5	3	3	6	5	–	4	10
Aximage	22–25 Apr 2021	830	58.8	**38.2**	26.1	9.2	5.7	0.4	2.7	7.2	4.9	0.8	4.8	12.1
Intercampus	7–13 Apr 2021	609	?	**36.2**	23.3	9.4	5.2	3.1	4.8	9.4	5.0	0.4	3.2	12.9
ICS/ISCTE	5–13 Apr 2021	802	?	**37**	29	9	7	1	2	6	1	–	8	8
Eurosondagem	5–8 Apr 2021	1,020	?	**39.6**	27.8	6.2	5.2	2.0	2.1	7.7	2.5	–	6.9	11.8
Aximage	24–27 Mar 2021	830	61.0	**39.7**	23.6	8.6	6.0	1.1	3.2	8.5	4.8	0.8	3.6	16.1
Intercampus	4–10 Mar 2021	615	?	**37.6**	23.6	8.3	5.5	2.3	2.5	9.0	5.3	0.7	5.2	14.0
Eurosondagem	1–4 Mar 2021	1,010	?	**39.5**	28.2	7.0	4.5	2.2	2.5	7.5	2.1	–	6.5	11.3
Aximage	17–20 Feb 2021	822	57.4	**37.6**	26.5	7.7	5.8	0.8	4.0	6.5	5.7	1.3	4.1	11.1
Intercampus	8–13 Feb 2021	609	?	**37.6**	24.7	8.2	5.8	2.7	3.1	7.3	5.6	0.7	4.3	12.9
Eurosondagem	8–11 Feb 2021	1,022	?	**39.3**	27.2	6.9	4.8	2.5	2.0	7.3	3.0	–	7.0	12.1
CESOP–UCP	24 Jan 2021	4,637	?	**35**	23	8	6	2	2	9	7	1	7	12
Pitagórica	7–18 Jan 2021	629	?	**42.6**	25.7	5.4	5.4	1.6	2.3	6.8	5.0	–	5.4	16.9
Aximage	9–15 Jan 2021	1,183	53.7	**39.9**	26.6	7.2	5.0	0.8	3.5	7.5	3.5	0.6	5.5	13.3
CESOP–UCP	11–14 Jan 2021	2,001	?	**39**	28	7	6	2	2	8	5	–	3	11
Eurosondagem	11–14 Jan 2021	1,021	?	**39.0**	28.0	6.5	5.3	2.1	2.2	5.5	1.3	–	10.1	11.0
Pitagórica	29 Dec 2020–10 Jan 2021	629	?	**41.4**	28.0	7.1	5.1	1.2	2.2	5.9	4.1	–	5.1	13.4
Intercampus	4–7 Jan 2021	603	?	**38.0**	24.1	9.1	5.7	2.3	3.6	9.1	3.8	0.2	4.1	13.9
Pitagórica	22 Dec 2020–3 Jan 2021	629	?	**40.9**	26.3	7.3	4.1	1.4	1.8	8.4	2.8	0.2	6.9	14.6
Pitagórica	17–27 Dec 2020	629	?	**39.7**	27.9	5.6	4.1	2.3	1.7	9.1	3.3	–	6.2	11.8
Aximage	19–22 Dec 2020	812	55.0	**38.5**	25.4	8.5	5.7	0.3	4.7	7.7	3.5	0.5	5.2	13.1
Pitagórica	17–20 Dec 2020	629	?	**40.3**	28.5	5.5	5.3	1.8	2.2	8.4	2.4	–	5.5	11.8
Intercampus	14–18 Dec 2020	603	?	**38.0**	23.6	7.3	5.4	3.2	3.4	7.7	4.5	0.9	6.0	14.4
Pitagórica	10–13 Dec 2020	629	?	**41.9**	26.0	6.7	5.4	1.9	2.3	8.3	1.5	–	6.0	15.9
CESOP–UCP	4–11 Dec 2020	1,315	?	**37**	30	7	7	3	3	6	5	–	2	7
Eurosondagem	7–10 Dec 2020	1,020	?	**38.8**	29.4	7.2	5.3	2.5	2.0	5.2	1.1	–	8.5	9.4
Aximage	23–26 Nov 2020	647	58.4	**37.2**	23.9	7.9	5.8	1.0	6.5	7.5	2.2	0.6	7.4	13.3
ICS/ISCTE	11–25 Nov 2020	802	?	**39**	25	8	7	2	2	7	1	–	9	14
Intercampus	9–16 Nov 2020	622	?	**37.1**	24.2	7.7	4.9	4.1	5.3	7.3	3.3	1.8	4.4	12.9
Eurosondagem	2–5 Nov 2020	1,011	?	**38.3**	29.7	8.3	5.8	2.7	2.2	5.0	1.0	–	7.0	8.6
Aximage	22–26 Oct 2020	694	59.1	**35.5**	27.0	10.0	5.7	1.2	5.2	5.4	3.2	0.4	6.4	8.5
Intercampus	6–11 Oct 2020	618	?	**37.5**	24.8	11.0	4.3	4.1	4.1	7.7	2.4	0.4	3.7	12.7
Eurosondagem	5–8 Oct 2020	1,010	?	**38.8**	29.0	8.1	5.5	3.3	2.0	4.8	1.3	–	7.2	9.8
ICS/ISCTE	14–24 Sep 2020	801	?	**37**	27	8	6	2	4	7	2	–	6	10
Aximage	12–15 Sep 2020	603	55.1	**37.6**	23.9	8.3	5.6	1.1	4.8	6.8	2.6	1.2	8.1	13.7
Eurosondagem	7–10 Sep 2020	1,022	?	**38.5**	28.2	8.3	5.8	2.5	3.3	4.5	1.0	–	7.9	10.3
Intercampus	4–9 Sep 2020	614	?	**37.4**	24.3	9.9	5.1	4.3	4.1	7.4	2.1	0.4	5.0	13.1
Intercampus	6–11 Aug 2020	601	?	**39.6**	24.8	8.5	6.1	4.4	3.2	7.9	2.8	0.0	2.7	14.8
CESOP–UCP	13–18 Jul 2020	1,482	?	**39**	26	7	6	3	3	7	3	–	6	13
Intercampus	8–13 Jul 2020	620	?	**39.0**	23.9	10.4	6.2	4.8	3.0	6.2	2.8	0.4	3.2	15.1
Aximage	5–8 Jul 2020	624	55.9	**40.4**	26.7	8.5	6.0	2.1	2.6	5.2	2.1	0.1	6.3	13.7
Eurosondagem	29 Jun–2 Jul 2020	1,025	?	**38.4**	29.3	8.4	6.0	2.2	2.8	4.4	1.1	–	7.4	9.1
Intercampus	9–13 Jun 2020	610	?	**40.0**	24.1	9.8	6.2	4.1	3.1	6.8	1.9	0.8	3.2	15.9
Aximage	5–8 Jun 2020	605	59.2	**39.9**	25.8	8.0	4.9	1.2	4.3	5.3	1.4	0.2	9.0	14.1
Eurosondagem	1–4 Jun 2020	1,021	?	**38.0**	29.3	8.0	5.3	2.7	3.0	4.1	1.1	–	8.5	8.7
Pitagórica	16–24 May 2020	802	?	**44.8**	24.1	6.1	5.8	2.8	3.3	6.4	1.6	–	5.1	20.7
Eurosondagem	17–20 May 2020	2,120	?	**37.9**	30.0	8.1	5.2	3.2	2.2	4.3	1.2	–	7.9	7.9
Intercampus	5–9 May 2020	620	?	**40.3**	23.3	9.0	5.9	3.6	3.6	6.8	3.2	0.7	3.6	17.0
Eurosondagem	4–7 May 2020	1,005	?	**37.7**	29.4	8.3	5.5	3.0	2.5	4.0	1.2	–	8.4	8.3
Pitagórica	15–26 Apr 2020	605	?	**41.9**	23.1	8.1	5.6	2.6	2.6	7.3	2.6	–	6.2	18.8
Intercampus	9–14 Apr 2020	623	?	**35.4**	23.3	11.9	5.8	3.9	4.9	7.8	2.4	0.7	3.9	12.1
Eurosondagem	29 Mar–2 Apr 2020	1,008	?	**37.5**	27.2	9.0	6.0	2.8	2.4	3.6	1.2	–	10.3	10.3
Pitagórica	13–21 Mar 2020	605	?	**41.7**	25.2	8.6	5.4	2.9	3.1	8.1	2.0	–	3.1	16.5
Intercampus	13–19 Mar 2020	611	?	**31.4**	21.9	14.5	6.1	3.6	5.9	8.6	2.3	0.2	5.5	9.5
Eurosondagem	1–5 Mar 2020	1,011	?	**37.3**	27.4	8.8	6.3	2.9	2.8	3.3	1.1	–	10.1	9.9
Aximage	14–18 Feb 2020	839	56.1	**35.1**	26.1	7.7	5.4	2.1	4.1	4.3	2.5	0.7	12.0	9.0
Intercampus	11–17 Feb 2020	614	?	**31.1**	23.8	13.2	6.3	3.5	5.4	6.9	2.9	0.8	6.1	7.3
Eurosondagem	2–6 Feb 2020	1,020	?	**37.4**	26.7	9.0	6.5	3.3	3.1	2.5	1.1	0.5	9.9	10.7
ICS/ISCTE	22 Jan–5 Feb 2020	800	?	**33**	28	9	8	4	3	6	2	1	6	5
Intercampus	19–24 Jan 2020	619	?	**32.8**	25.8	11.9	6.2	1.9	6.0	6.2	2.3	1.7	5.2	7.0
Eurosondagem	5–9 Jan 2020	1,010	?	**37.2**	26.5	9.6	6.6	3.5	3.6	2.2	1.3	0.6	8.9	10.7
Intercampus	12–17 Dec 2019	606	?	**33.9**	25.7	10.7	6.3	3.9	6.1	5.7	2.4	1.1	4.2	8.2
Eurosondagem	8–12 Dec 2019	1,019	?	**37.1**	26.9	9.5	7.1	3.6	3.5	1.9	1.1	0.6	8.7	10.2
Intercampus	20–26 Nov 2019	604	?	**34.9**	24.9	10.8	8.1	2.9	4.8	4.8	2.9	2.7	3.2	10.0
Eurosondagem	17–21 Nov 2019	1,011	?	**36.9**	27.1	10.1	6.9	4.0	3.3	–	–	–	11.7	9.8
Aximage	8–11 Nov 2019	639	?	**37.4**	27.1	10.4	6.2	4.0	3.2	3.0	1.3	0.9	6.5	10.3
Intercampus	22–28 Oct 2019	604	?	**35.6**	24.8	10.7	6.9	4.4	5.3	2.5	0.8	2.7	6.3	10.8
**2019 legislative election**	6 Oct 2019	—N/a	48.6	**36.3**; 108	27.8; 79	9.5; 19	6.3; 12	4.2; 5	3.3; 4	1.3; 1	1.3; 1	1.1; 1	8.8; 0	**8.5**

==== Hypothetical scenarios ====
Hypothetical polling

Paulo Rangel as PSD leader

Polling firm/Link	Fieldwork date	Sample size	Turnout	PS	PSD (Paulo Rangel)	BE	CDU	CDS–PP	PAN	CH	IL	L	O	Lead
Pitagórica	10–15 Nov 2021	625	?	**39.6**	23.9	5.7	5.5	2.4	2.0	8.4	5.1	–	7.4	15.7

== Constituency polling ==
=== Madeira ===
Unlike the rest of the country, in Madeira, the PSD and CDS–PP contested the election under a coalition called Madeira First.

Polling firm/Link	Fieldwork date	Sample size	Turnout	PSD	CDS–PP	PS		BE	CDU	PAN	IL	CH	O	Lead
2022 legislative election	30 Jan 2022	—N/a	50.3	39.8; 3		31.5; 3	6.9; 0	3.2; 0	2.0; 0	1.6; 0	3.3; 0	6.1; 0	5.6; 0	8.3
Intercampus	21–25 Jan 2022	603	?	47.7; 4		33.3; 2	2.9; 0	3.6; 0	–	–	2.3; 0	–	10.2; 0	14.4
2019 legislative election	6 Oct 2019	—N/a	50.3	37.2; 3	6.1; 0	33.4; 3	5.5; 0	5.2; 0	2.1; 0	1.8; 0	0.7; 0	0.7; 0	7.3; 0	3.8

== Leadership polls ==
=== Preferred prime minister ===
Poll results showing public opinion on who would make the best prime minister are shown in the table below in reverse chronological order, showing the most recent first.

==== António Costa vs Rui Rio ====
Polling firm/Link	Fieldwork date	António Costa	Rui Rio	N	Both/ O	NO	Lead
CESOP–UCP	19–26 Jan 2022	48	36	–	–	14	12
CESOP–UCP	12–18 Jan 2022	50	35	–	–	15	15
Aximage	6–12 Jan 2022	47	21	16	5	12	26
CESOP–UCP	6–10 Jan 2022	49	35	–	–	16	14
CESOP–UCP	28 Dec 2021–5 Jan 2022	52	33	–	–	15	19
Aximage	9–13 Dec 2021	46	21	19	5	9	25
Aximage	28–31 Oct 2021	44.1	18.6	29.4	1.4	6.5	25.5
Aximage	10–12 Jul 2021	45	22	28	1	4	23
Aximage	26–30 May 2021	52	15	24	2	7	37
Aximage	22–25 Apr 2021	55	17	20	2	6	38
Aximage	24–27 Mar 2021	54	18	18	4	6	36
Aximage	17–20 Feb 2021	54	20	19	3	4	34
Aximage	19–22 Dec 2020	53	19	22	2	4	34
Aximage	23–26 Nov 2020	50	18	22	4	7	32
Aximage	22–26 Oct 2020	47	17	23	4	9	30
Aximage	12–15 Sep 2020	48	17	25	4	6	31
Aximage	5–8 Jul 2020	55	17	19	5	5	38
Aximage	5–8 Jun 2020	57.3	18.2	17.3	3.2	4.0	39.1
Aximage	7–10 Mar 2020	41.1	21.3	30.8	1.9	4.9	19.8
Aximage	14–18 Feb 2020	43.8	21.8	24.7	3.9	5.8	22.0
Aximage	9–12 Jan 2020	43.6	19.5	27.5	2.8	6.6	24.1

=== Cabinet approval/disapproval ratings ===
==== Graphical summary ====
View source data.

==== Polling ====
Poll results showing public opinion on the performance of the Government are shown in the table below in reverse chronological order, showing the most recent first.

Polling firm/Link	Fieldwork date	Sample size	António Costa's cabinet				
Polling firm/Link	Fieldwork date	Sample size	Approve	Disapprove	Neither	No opinion	Lead
ICS/ISCTE	10–20 Dec 2021	901	52	39	—N/a	9	13
ICS/ISCTE	21 Oct–1 Nov 2021	800	44	48	—N/a	8	4
Aximage	28–31 Oct 2021	803	34	45	18	3	11
Eurosondagem	20–23 Sep 2021	1,032	32.7	27.9	—N/a	39.4	4.8
Intercampus	14–23 Sep 2021	609	42.7	28.5	27.4	1.3	14.2
Intercampus	13–20 Aug 2021	612	36.1	29.9	32.2	1.8	3.9
Eurosondagem	16–19 Aug 2021	1,052	30.1	25.5	—N/a	44.4	4.6
Eurosondagem	26–29 Jul 2021	1,025	25.5	38.6	—N/a	35.9	13.1
CESOP–UCP	9–15 Jul 2021	1,202	16	29	52	3	23
Aximage	10–12 Jul 2021	763	37	33	28	2	4
Eurosondagem	5–8 Jul 2021	1,022	48.0	47.0	—N/a	5.0	1.0
Aximage	26–30 May 2021	796	44	29	22	5	15
Eurosondagem	10–13 May 2021	1,008	36.0	22.0	—N/a	42.0	12.0
Intercampus	5–11 May 2021	611	43.6	28.5	26.2	1.6	15.1
Aximage	22–25 Apr 2021	830	55	22	22	1	33
Intercampus	7–13 Apr 2021	609	44.3	29.1	25.1	1.5	15.2
ICS/ISCTE	5–13 Apr 2021	802	55	38	—N/a	7	17
Eurosondagem	5–8 Apr 2021	1,020	27.3	17.7	—N/a	55.0	9.6
Aximage	24–27 Mar 2021	830	55	24	19	2	31
Intercampus	4–10 Mar 2021	615	42.6	23.2	32.2	2.0	10.4
Eurosondagem	1–4 Mar 2021	1,010	21.0	16.2	—N/a	62.8	4.8
Aximage	17–20 Feb 2021	822	50	33	15	2	17
Intercampus	8–13 Feb 2021	609	38.8	32.9	26.1	2.3	5.9
Eurosondagem	7–11 Feb 2021	1,022	21.0	9.9	—N/a	69.1	11.1
Eurosondagem	11–14 Jan 2021	1,021	42.0	28.7	—N/a	29.3	13.3
Intercampus	4–7 Jan 2021	603	49.6	22.4	26.7	1.3	22.9
Aximage	19–22 Dec 2020	812	47	31	19	3	16
Intercampus	14–18 Dec 2020	603	44.2	28.9	24.7	2.2	15.3
Eurosondagem	7–10 Dec 2020	1,020	42.0	29.9	—N/a	28.1	12.1
Aximage	23–26 Nov 2020	647	51	33	12	4	18
ICS/ISCTE	11–25 Nov 2020	802	51	42	—N/a	7	9
Intercampus	9–16 Nov 2020	622	45.5	29.1	24.8	0.6	16.4
Eurosondagem	2–5 Nov 2020	1,011	41.8	28.2	—N/a	30.0	13.6
Aximage	22–26 Oct 2020	694	45	30	19	6	15
Intercampus	6–11 Oct 2020	618	47.3	23.7	27.9	1.1	19.4
Eurosondagem	5–8 Oct 2020	1,010	39.6	25.2	—N/a	35.2	14.4
ICS/ISCTE	14–24 Sep 2020	801	49	43	—N/a	8	6
Aximage	12–15 Sep 2020	603	48	35	14	4	13
Eurosondagem	7–10 Sep 2020	1,022	40.0	25.0	—N/a	35.0	15.0
Intercampus	4–9 Sep 2020	614	50.4	21.0	26.5	2.1	23.9
Intercampus	6–11 Aug 2020	601	48.6	20.8	28.3	2.3	20.3
CESOP–UCP	13–18 Jul 2020	1,482	73	21	—N/a	6	52
Intercampus	9–13 Jul 2020	620	49.3	17.8	30.8	2.1	18.5
Aximage	5–8 Jul 2020	624	57	26	13	4	31
Eurosondagem	29 Jun–2 Jul 2020	1,025	41.0	24.5	—N/a	34.5	16.5
Intercampus	9–13 Jun 2020	610	59.5	15.4	24.1	1.0	35.4
Eurosondagem	1–4 Jun 2020	1,021	42.5	25.0	—N/a	32.5	17.5
Pitagórica	16–24 May 2020	802	53	10	37	0	16
Intercampus	6–9 May 2020	620	62.9	11.5	23.7	1.9	39.2
Eurosondagem	4–7 May 2020	1,005	43.3	25.2	—N/a	31.5	18.1
Pitagórica	15–26 Apr 2020	605	48	11	41	0	7
Intercampus	9–14 Apr 2020	623	67.4	10.7	20.1	1.8	47.3
Eurosondagem	29 Mar–2 Apr 2020	1,008	44.2	27.2	—N/a	28.6	17.0
Pitagórica	13–21 Mar 2020	605	33	20	47	0	14
Intercampus	13–19 Mar 2020	611	47.9	25.2	25.7	2.1	22.2
Eurosondagem	1–5 Mar 2020	1,011	42.5	26.9	—N/a	30.6	15.6
Intercampus	11–17 Feb 2020	614	31.6	33.4	32.9	2.1	0.5
Eurosondagem	2–6 Feb 2020	1,020	43.3	26.9	—N/a	30.0	16.4
ICS/ISCTE	22 Jan–5 Feb 2020	800	57	34	—N/a	9	23
Intercampus	19–24 Jan 2020	619	35.1	31.6	31.3	1.9	3.5
Eurosondagem	5–9 Jan 2020	1,010	42.9	26.8	—N/a	30.3	16.1
Intercampus	12–17 Dec 2019	606	33.7	34.5	28.7	3.1	0.8
Eurosondagem	8–12 Dec 2019	1,019	43.4	26.6	—N/a	30.0	16.8
Intercampus	20–26 Nov 2019	604	34.3	30.3	31.0	4.5	3.3
Eurosondagem	17–21 Nov 2019	1,011	43.7	26.8	—N/a	29.5	16.9
Intercampus	22–28 Oct 2019	604	36.7	28.1	31.6	3.5	5.1
