= José Manuel Fernandes (journalist) =

Portuguese journalist (born 1957)

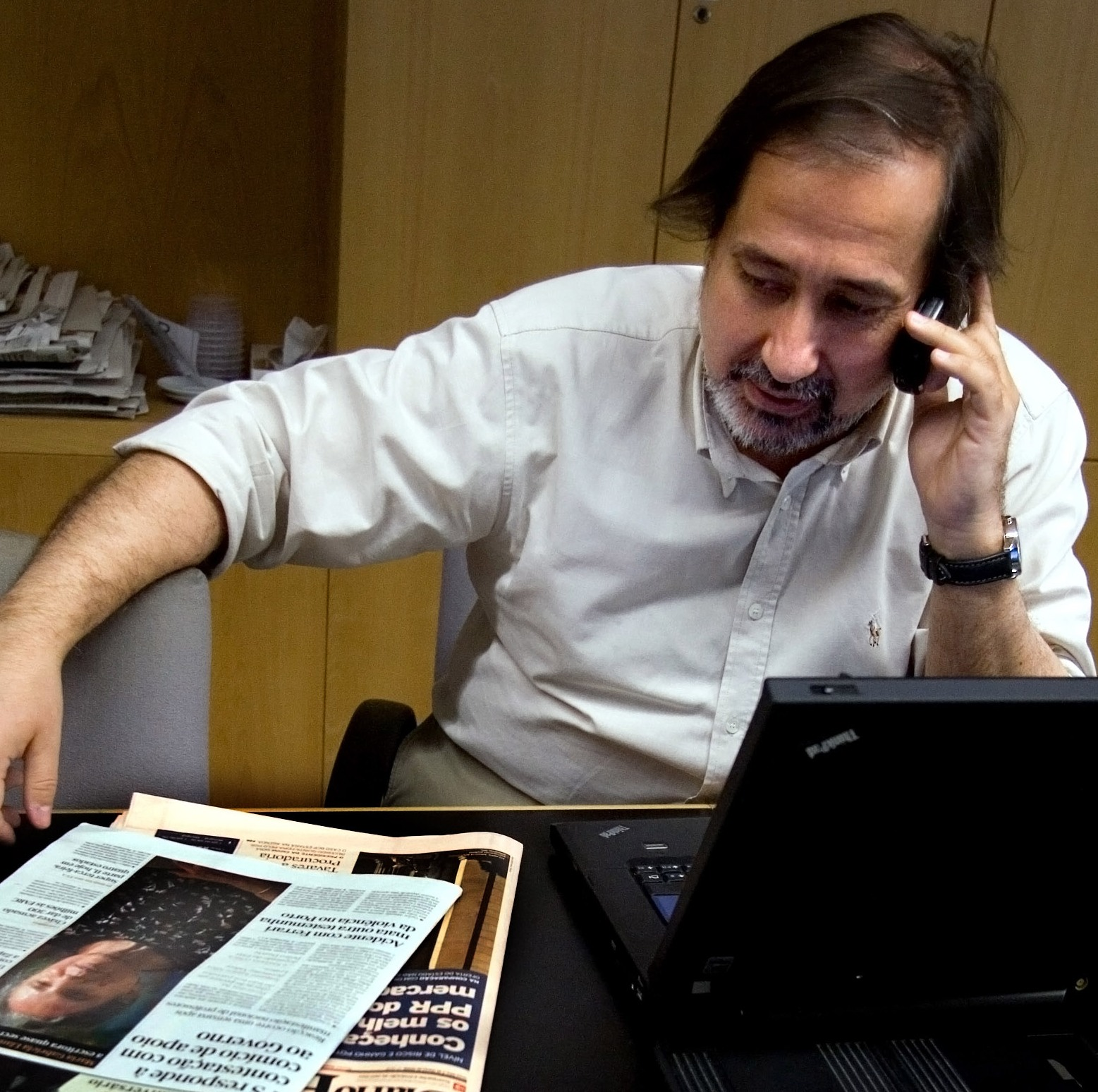
José Manuel Fernandes

José Manuel Fernandes (born in Lisbon in 1957) is a Portuguese journalist, founder and former director of the daily newspaper Público, and a co-founder and publisher of the online newspaper Observador.

== Career ==
José Manuel Fernandes was born in Lisbon on 7 April 1957. He studied at Liceu Pedro Nunes, became involved in the student association movement even before the 25 April Revolution of 1974 in Portugal and started working as a journalist in 1976. Between 1978 and 1984 he studied biology at the Faculty of Sciences of the University of Lisbon. After a spell at the weekly A Voz do Povo, he worked in the 1980s at the weekly Expresso, which he left in 1989 to found the newspaper Público, which he headed for 20 years, 11 of them as director, until October 2009. He continued to work as a columnist and freelance journalist until 2014, when he founded the newspaper Observador, of which he is publisher. The author of several books on cultural and environmental heritage and political issues, he has also been a lecturer at various higher education institutions and taught seminars at the Institute of Political Studies at the Portuguese Catholic University.

== Personal life ==
He is married, has two children and lives in Sintra Municipality.
