= Observador =

Portuguese online newspaper

- Format: Online Newspaper
- Owner(s): Observador On Time, S.A.
- Founder(s): António Carrapatoso, José Manuel Fernandes, Rui Ramos
- Publisher: José Manuel Fernandes
- Editor: Miguel Pinheiro
- Political alignment: Right-wing
- Language: Portuguese
- Headquarters: Lisbon, Portugal
- Circulation: 6,999,215 (Unique Visitors, November 2021)
- Website: www.observador.pt

Observador is a Portuguese online newspaper started on 19 May 2014. It is the only Portuguese-language newspaper in Portugal with a defined political orientation (right-wing liberalism).

It is an online newspaper with no printed edition, with the exception of the Anniversary and Lifestyle editions. Observador commits itself to publish and update information on a 24/7 basis.

In the first month, it reported 630,000 visitors. By August 2015, it reported six million visitors and 35 million pageviews. In January 2020, it reported 6.79 million visitors and 51.34 million pageviews.

In its first year, the newspaper won the "Launch of the Year" award in the Meios & Publicidade Awards. It also elected as newspaper of the year in 2018 by the same organization and it won the 2019 Edition of the Marktest award in "Press and Digital - Media".

== Rádio Observador ==
Rádio Observador
- Portugal
- Frequencies: 93.7/98.7 MHz Lisbon, 88.1/98.4 MHz Porto

Programming
- Language: Portuguese
- Format: Information

Ownership
- Owner: Observador On Time, S.A.

History
- First air date: 27 June 2019

Links
- Webcast: https://www.observador.pt/

On 27 June 2019, Rádio Observador launched on 98.7 MHz in the Lisbon Metropolitan Area with about 30 collaborators. In October 2019, it launched on 98.4 MHz in the Porto Metropolitan Area. The radio focuses on information but also airs music. Its many programs are also published in podcast format.
