= Rui Ramos (footballer) =

Portuguese footballer

Rui André Oliveira Ramos (born 6 February 1995 in Valongo) is a Portuguese footballer who plays for Leixões S.C. as a midfielder.

== Football career ==
On 17 August 2014, Rui André made his professional debut with Leixões in a 2014–15 Segunda Liga match against Benfica B.
