= Rui Ramos (historian) =

Portuguese history lecturer (born 1962)

Rui Manuel Monteiro Lopes Ramos (born 1962 in Torres Vedras) is a Portuguese history lecturer and researcher. He is a co-founder and a member of the Board of Directors of the online newspaper Observador. In 2013, he was awarded the Ordem do Infante D. Henrique.

== Career ==
Ramos graduated in History from the Faculty of Letters of the University of Lisbon (FLUL) in 1985. He had a brief period as a trainee assistant at FLUL and later served as a guest lecturer at the Faculty of Law of the New University of Lisbon (1998–2001). Since 2001, he has been a guest lecturer at the Institute of Political Studies of the Portuguese Catholic University.

At the Institute of Social Sciences of the University of Lisbon (ICS-UL), Ramos was a member of the Standing Committee of the Scientific Council (2001–2004), the Postgraduate Committee (1998–2000), and the editorial board of the journal Análise Social (2003–2004).

Specialising in the history of Portugal during the 19th and 20th centuries, Ramos focuses on political and cultural aspects, particularly the period at the end of the constitutional monarchy and the First Republic. He is also an expert on the history of political ideas in Europe during these centuries.

Ramos earned his PhD in Political Science from Oxford University in 1997. He has authored numerous articles in both Portuguese and international scientific journals, and several books, including A Segunda Fundação (The Second Foundation, 1994), Volume VI of the History of Portugal directed by José Mattoso, João Franco e o Fracasso do Reformismo Liberal (João Franco and the Failure of Liberal Reformism, 2001), and a biography of King Carlos I of Portugal in the Kings of Portugal series (2006).

He is a member of the Board of Directors of the online newspaper Observador, where he has also collaborated on several radio programmes. Ramos has written weekly columns for Diário Económico (2005), Público (2006–2009), Correio da Manhã (2009), and Expresso (2010–2013). He has contributed to weekly debate programmes on RTP3, TVI 24, SIC Notícias, and Canal Q, and was the author of the 12-part series Portugal de... on RTP1 (2006–2007).
