= 2019 European Parliament election in Portugal =

- 26 May 2019

All 21 Portuguese seats to the European Parliament
- Turnout: 30.7% ▼3.1 pp
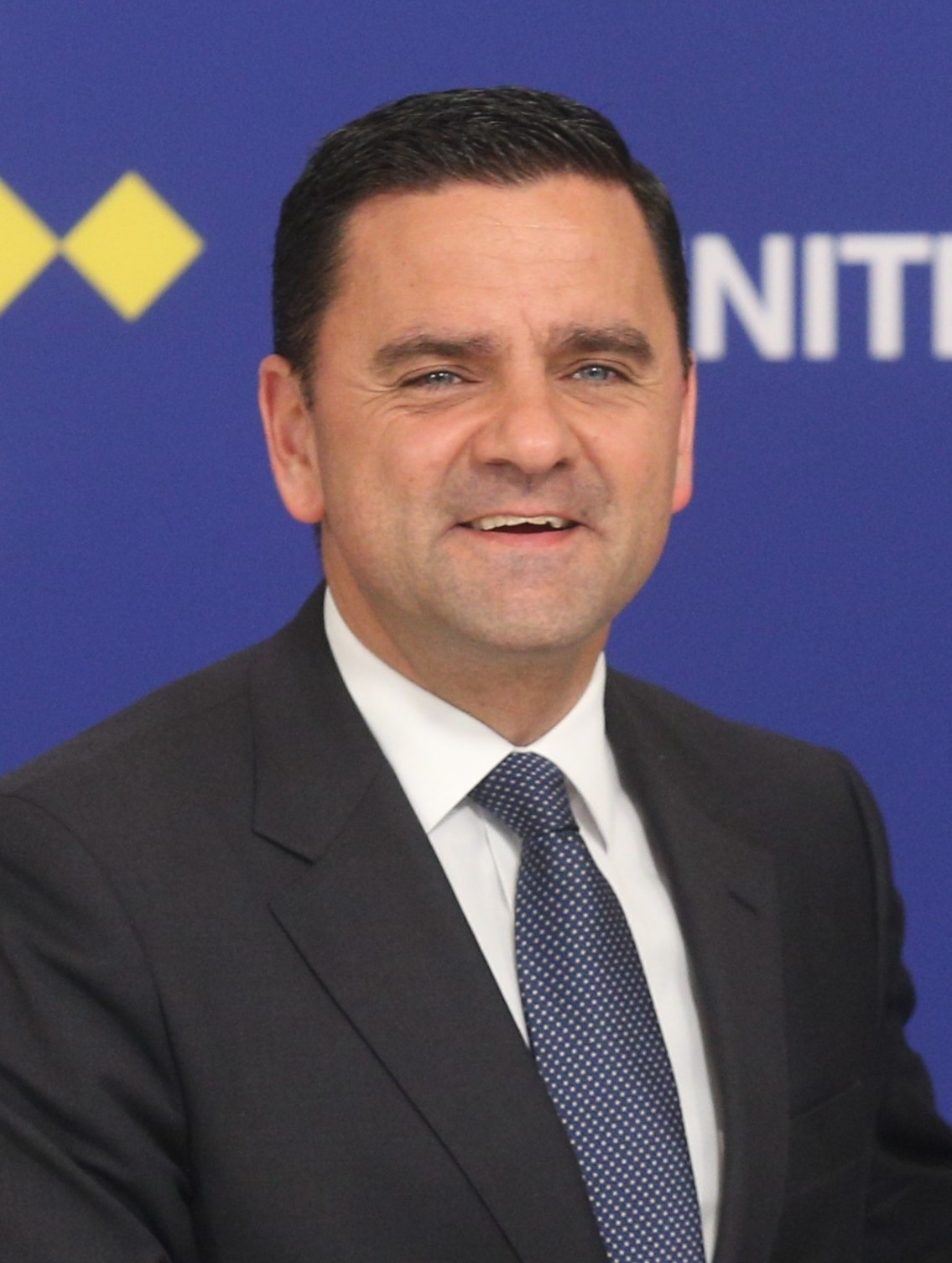

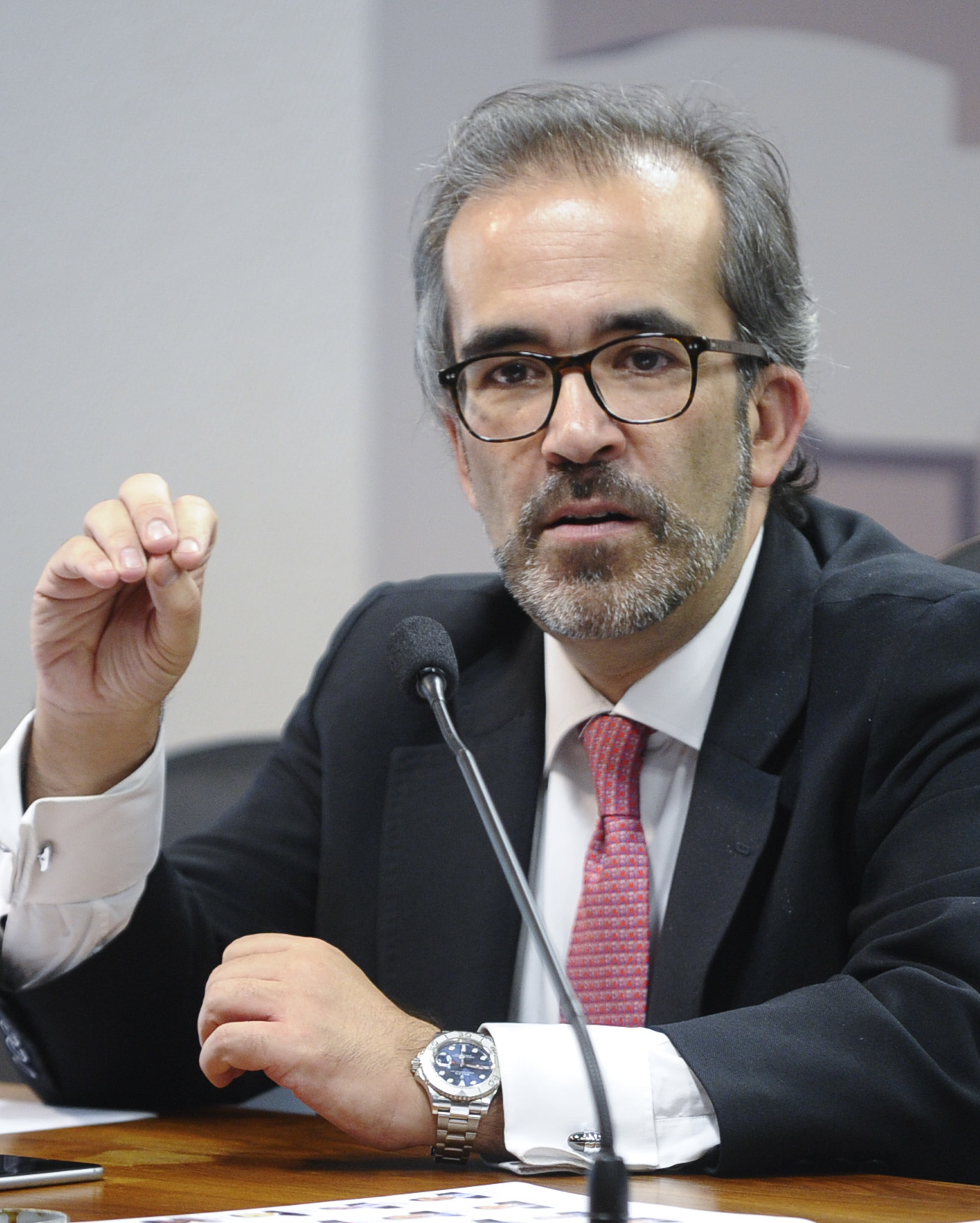

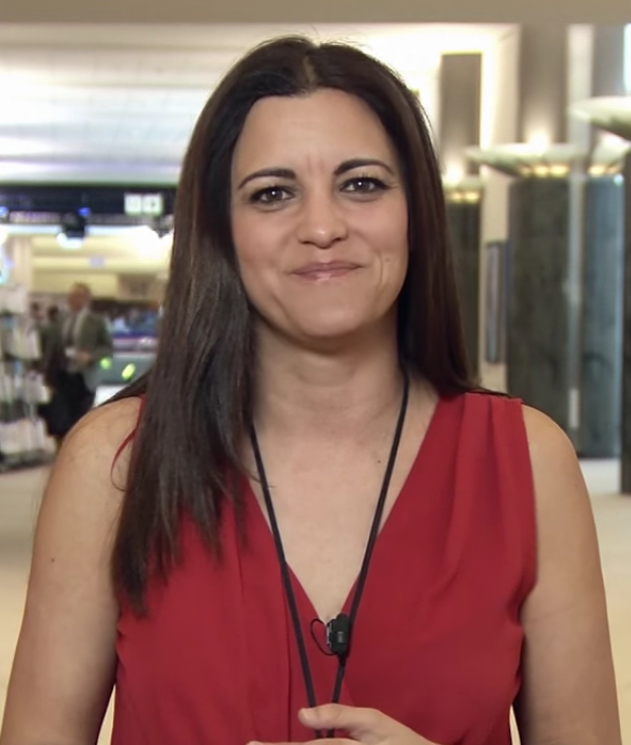

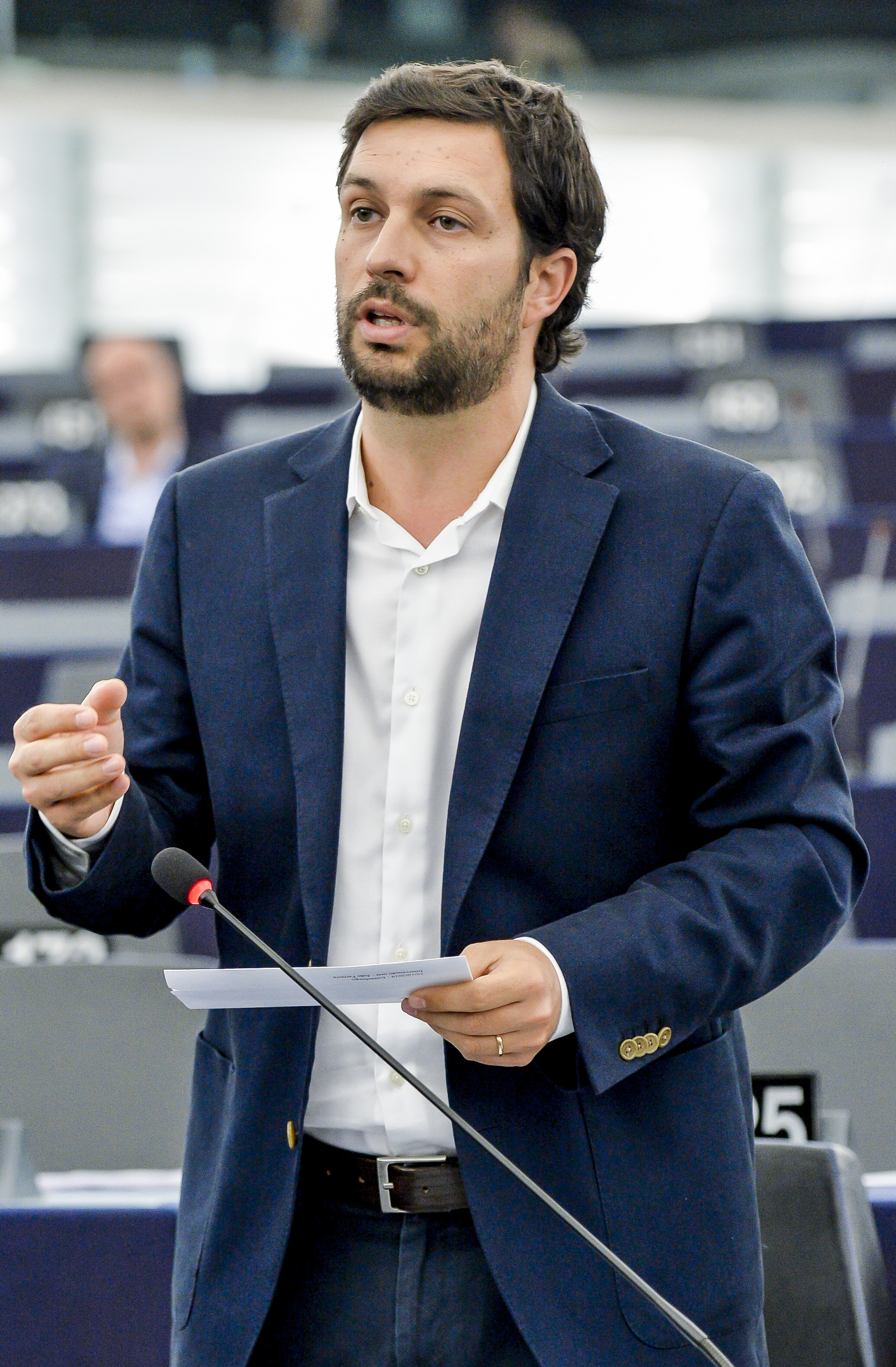

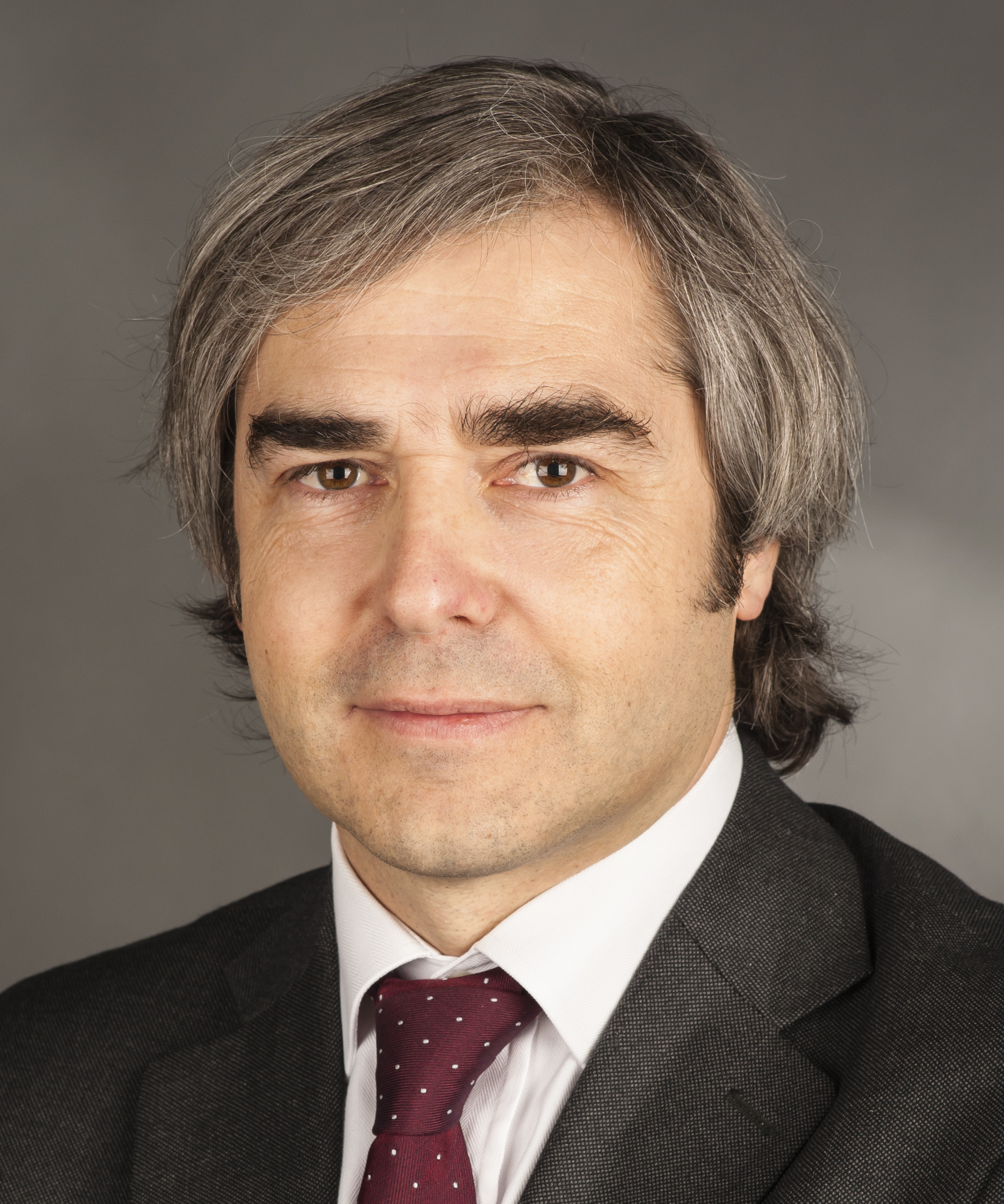

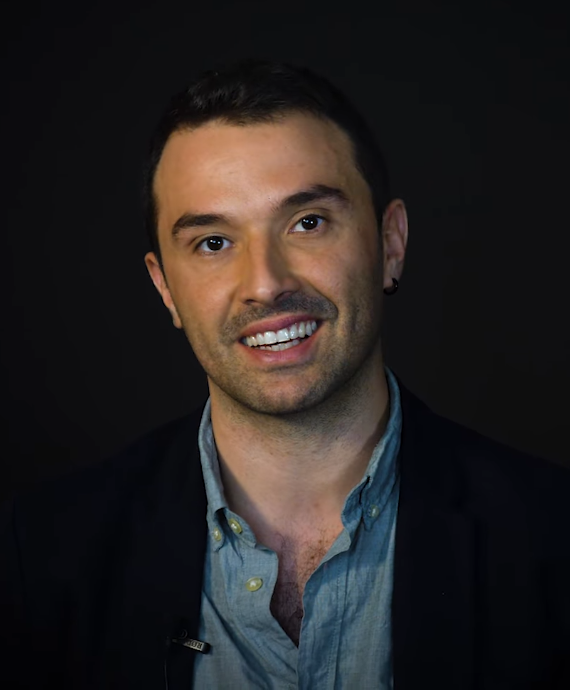
	First party	Second party	Third party
Leader	Pedro Marques	Paulo Rangel	Marisa Matias
Party	PS	PSD	BE
Alliance	S&D	EPP	GUE/NGL
Last election	8 seats, 31.5%	6 seats (AP) (Note: The Social Democratic Party (PSD) and the People's Party (CDS–PP) contested the 2014 election in a coalition called Portugal Alliance (AP) and won a combined 27.7% of the vote and elected 7 MP's to the European parliament.)	1 seats, 4.6%
Seats won	9	6	2
Seat change	▲1	0	▲1
Popular vote	1,104,694	725,399	325,093
Percentage	33.4%	21.9%	9.8%
Swing	▲1.9 pp		▲5.3 pp
	Fourth party	Fifth party	Sixth party
Leader	João Ferreira	Nuno Melo	Francisco Guerreiro
Party	CDU	CDS–PP	PAN
Alliance	GUE/NGL	EPP	Greens/EFA
Last election	3 seats, 12.7%	1 seat (AP)	0 seats, 1.7%
Seats won	2	1	1
Seat change	▼1	0	▲1
Popular vote	228,045	204,792	168,015
Percentage	6.9%	6.2%	5.1%
Swing	▼5.8 pp		▲3.4 pp
- Map of districts and autonomous regions.

An election was held in Portugal on Sunday, 26 May 2019, to elect the Portuguese delegation to the European Parliament from 2019 to 2024. This was the eighth European Parliament election held in Portugal.

The Socialist Party (PS) was the winner of the election, scoring 33.4 percent of the vote. The party increased their share of the votes by 2 percentage points from the 2014 election, and won an additional seat. It was one of the only three times in Portuguese history where the government party won a European election.

The Social Democratic Party (PSD) achieved its worst results ever as a standalone party, with 21.9 percent of the vote, distancing more than eleven points from the winner. The People's Party (CDS), which ran alongside the PSD in the previous election, as part of the Portugal Alliance, also fell below expectations at 6.2 percent of the vote, only being able to elect their top candidate Nuno Melo.

The Democratic Unity Coalition (CDU) scored their worst result as well, narrowly electing two European Parliament members compared with their former three. On the other hand, the Left Bloc (BE) rebounded to previous support levels, more than doubling its vote share to 9.8 percent and electing a new member.

The big surprise of the elections was the result of People-Animals-Nature (PAN). Headed by civil engineer André Silva, PAN won 5.1 percent of the votes and was able to elect its first ever European Parliament member, over-performing the polls.

Turnout, again, fell to the lowest level ever, with only 30.7 percent of voters casting a ballot. Abstention reached an unprecedented level of 99.04 percent for Portuguese citizens living abroad.

== Electoral system ==
The voting method used, for the election of European members of parliament, is by proportional representation using the D'Hondt method. For the 2019 European Union elections, Portugal had 21 seats to fill. Deputies are elected in a single constituency, corresponding to the entire national territory.

This election was also the first in which the changes to the electoral law approved in 2018 were put into practice. The main changes were the automatic registration of all Portuguese citizens, at home and abroad, above 17 year's old, prompting the number of registered voters to increase from 9.7 million to almost 10.8 million, the introduction of early voting to all voters without filling an excuse, in previous elections voters could only vote early if they were unable to attend a polling station on election day, and the end of the "voting card", as voters would only need their identification card to cast a ballot. To vote early, 19,584 voters, 0.2 percent of all registered voters, requested an early ballot. According to the government, 14,909 voters cast an early ballot.

== Parties and candidates ==
The major parties that participated in the election and their European Parliament list leaders, ranked by percentage of the vote received, were:

- Socialist Party (PS), Pedro Marques
- Social Democratic Party (PSD), Paulo Rangel
- Left Bloc (BE), Marisa Matias
- Democratic Unity Coalition (CDU), João Ferreira
- People's Party (CDS), Nuno Melo
- People–Animals–Nature (PAN), Francisco Guerreiro
- Alliance (A), Paulo Sande
- LIVRE (L), Rui Tavares
- Basta (B), André Ventura
- We, the Citizens! (NC), Paulo de Morais
- Liberal Initiative (IL), Ricardo Arroja
- Portuguese Workers' Communist Party (PCTP/MRPP), Luís Júdice
- National Renovator Party (PNR), João Patrocínio
- Democratic Republican Party (PDR), António Marinho e Pinto
- United Party of Retirees and Pensioners (PURP), Fernando Loureiro
- Portuguese Labour Party (PTP), Gonçalo Madaleno
- Socialist Alternative Movement (MAS), Vasco Santos

== Campaign period ==
=== Party slogans ===
Party or alliance	Original slogan	English translation	Refs
PS	« #Somos Europa »	"#We are Europe"	
PSD	« Marcar a diferença em Portugal e na Europa »	"Making a difference in Portugal and in Europe"	
CDU	« Defender o povo e o País »	"Defending the people and the country"	
CDS–PP	« Portugal, a Europa é aqui »	"Portugal, Europe is here"	
BE	« Lado a Lado, pelo que é de todos »	"Side by side, by what is everyone's"	
PDR	« A voz em Português que faz a diferença no Parlamento Europeu »	"The Portuguese voice that makes the difference in the European Parliament"	
PAN	« A Europa começa em ti »	"Europe starts with you"	
A	« Para ganhar uma Europa nova »	"To win a new Europe"	
LIVRE	« Faz a tua Europa » / «Todos votam. Todos contam »	"Make your Europe" / «Everyone votes. Everyone counts. »	
PNR	« Portugal português numa Europa europeia »	"Portuguese Portugal in a European Europe"	
B	« Basta! »	"Enough! "	

=== Candidates' debates ===
==== With parties represented in the European Parliament ====
2019 European Parliament election in Portugal debates
Date	Organisers	Moderator(s)	P Present A Absent invitee N Non-invitee						
Date	Organisers	Moderator(s)	PS	PSD	CDU	CDS–PP	BE	PDR	Refs
1 May	SIC	Bento; Rodrigues	P Marques	P Rangel	P Ferreira	P Melo	P Matias	P Pinto	
2 May	RTP3	Cristina; Esteves	N	N	N	P Melo	P Matias	N	
3 May	RTP3	Cristina; Esteves	N	P Rangel	P Ferreira	N	N	N	
4 May	RTP3	Cristina; Esteves	P Marques	N	N	P Melo	N	N	
5 May	RTP3	Cristina; Esteves	N	P Rangel	N	N	P Matias	N	
6 May	RTP3	Cristina; Esteves	P Marques	N	P Ferreira	N	N	N	
7 May	RTP3	Cristina; Esteves	N	P Rangel	N	P Melo	N	N	
8 May	TVI	José Alberto; Carvalho	P Marques	P Rangel	P Ferreira	P Melo	P Matias	P Pinto	
8 May	RTP3	Cristina; Esteves	N	N	P Ferreira	N	P Matias	N	
9 May	RTP3	Cristina; Esteves	P Marques	N	N	N	P Matias	N	
10 May	RTP3	Cristina; Esteves	N	N	P Ferreira	P Melo	N	N	
11 May	RTP1	Cristina; Esteves	P Marques	P Rangel	N	N	N	N	
20 May	RTP1	Maria Flor; Pedroso	P Marques	P Rangel	P Ferreira	P Melo	P Matias	N	

==== With parties not represented in the European Parliament ====
2019 European Parliament election in Portugal debates
Date	Organisers	Moderator(s)	P Present A Absent invitee N Non-invitee												
Date	Organisers	Moderator(s)	PDR	PAN	L	NC	B	PCTP	A	IL	PNR	PTP	PURP	MAS	Refs
7 May	SIC	Bento; Rodrigues	N	P Guerreiro	P Tavares	P Morais	P Ventura	P Júdice	P Sande	P Arroja	N	N	N	N	
13 May	RTP1	Maria Flor; Pedroso	A (Note: PDR main candidate, António Marinho e Pinto, was a MEP elected in 2014 and he refused to attend the debate with the minor parties with no representation in the European Parliament.); Pinto	P Guerreiro	P Tavares	P Morais	A Ventura	P Júdice	P Sande	P Arroja	P Patrocínio	P Madaleno	P Loureiro	P Santos	

== Opinion polls ==
Exit poll

Polling firm/Link	Fieldwork date	Sample size	TO	PS	PSD	CDS–PP	CDU	BE	PAN	PDR	A	BASTA!	O	Lead
2019 EP election	26 May 2019	—N/a	30.7	33.4; 9	21.9; 6	6.2; 1	6.9; 2	9.8; 2	5.1; 1	0.4; 0	1.9; 0	1.5; 0	12.9; 0	11.5
CESOP–UCP	26 May 2019	12,227	32.5	30–34; 8/9	20–24; 5/6	5–7; 1/2	7–9; 1/2	9–12; 2/3	4–6; 1/2	–	–	–	–	10
GfK/Metris	26 May 2019	7,169	31.5	30.9– 34.9; 8/9	21.8– 25.8; 6/7	4.7– 7.3; 1/2	5.3– 8.3; 2	8.5– 11.5; 2/3	4.7– 7.3; 1/2	–	–	–	13.1– 16.1; 0	9.1
Aximage	16–23 May 2019	766	34.9	32.4; 8/9	25.1; 6/7	7.1; 1	8.3; 2	11.1; 3	1.8; 0		2.5; 0		11.7; 0	7.3
Eurosondagem	15–22 May 2019	2,025	?	35.5; 8/10	25.5; 7	7.0; 1/2	7.6; 2	6.9; 1/2	2.5; 0/1		2.5; 0/1		12.5; 0	10.0
Aximage	16–20 May 2019	622	34.2	32.5; 8/9	25.4; 6/7	6.8; 1/2	9.3; 2	11.4; 3	1.4; 0		2.5; 0		10.7; 0	7.1
Pitagórica	10–19 May 2019	605	?	32.4; 7/8	24.8; 6/7	6.7; 1/2	7.1; 1/2	12.9; 2/3	3.3; 1	2.1; 0/1	1.2; 0	1.0; 0	8.5; 0	7.6
CESOP–UCP	16–19 May 2019	1,882	?	33; 8/9	23; 5/6	8; 2	8; 2	9; 2	3; 0/1		3; 0/1		13; 0	10
GfK/Metris	7–12 May 2019	803	?	36; 8/9	28; 6/7	8; 1/2	8; 1/2	9; 2	2; 0				9; 0	8
GfK/Metris	22 Apr–3 May 2019	802	?	34; 8	28; 7	9; 2	9; 2	8; 2	3; 0				9; 0	6
Eurosondagem	28 Apr–2 May 2019	2,010	?	34.0; 9/10	27.1; 7/8	7.1; 1/2	8.1; 2	7.1; 1/2	3.3; 0/1		3.3; 0/1		10.0; 0	6.9
Aximage	13–16 Apr 2019	612	40.6	31.7; 8/9	29.0; 7/8	7.7; 1/2	8.4; 2	8.3; 2	1.3; 0		1.3; 0	1.8; 0	10.5; 0	2.7
Pitagórica	3–13 Apr 2019	605	?	30.3; 7/8	28.0; 7/8	7.6; 2	6.5; 1	11.3; 2/3		1.7; 0			14.6; 0	2.3
Aximage	30 Mar–1 Apr 2019	602	43.8	33.6; 8	31.1; 8	6.8; 1	9.4; 2	8.0; 2	1.3; 0		1.3; 0		8.5; 0	2.5
Aximage	9–13 Mar 2019	600	44.5	34.1; 8/9	29.1; 7/8	7.3; 1/2	9.2; 2	7.6; 2	1.9; 0		2.0; 0		8.8; 0	5.0
Aximage (Note: Results presented here exclude undecideds (5.3%). With their inclusion results are: PS: 34.1%; PSD: 24.8%; BE: 9.2%; CDU: 8.3%; PP: 8.1%; A: 1.8%; PAN: 1.4%; Others: 7.0%.)	5–10 Feb 2019	602	38.2	36.0; 9	26.2; 6	8.6; 2	8.8; 2	9.7; 2	1.5; 0		1.9; 0		7.3; 0	9.8
Aximage (Note: Results presented here exclude undecideds (15.4%). With their inclusion results are: PS: 32.6%; PSD: 19.8%; CDU: 11.3%; PP: 8.4%; BE: 6.3%; PAN: 2.0%; A: 1.2%; Others: 3.0%.)	4–7 Jan 2019	608	36.0	38.5; 8/10	23.4; 5/7	9.9; 2/3	13.4; 2/3	7.4; 2/3	2.4; 0		1.4; 0		3.5; 0	15.1
2015 legislative elections	4 Oct 2015	—N/a	55.8	32.4 (8)	38.6 (9)		8.3 (2)	10.2 (2)	1.4 (0)	1.1 (0)	—N/a	—N/a	8.0 (0)	6.2
2014 EP election	25 May 2014	—N/a	33.7	31.5; 8	27.7; 6+1		12.7; 3	4.6; 1	1.7; 0	* (Note: The main candidate for the Earth Party (MPT) in 2014, António Marinho e Pinto, left MPT in late 2014 and formed his own party, the Democratic Republican Party (PDR).)	—N/a	0.9; 0	20.9; 2 (Note: Includes the 7.2%, and 2 seats, won by MPT in the 2014 EP elections. MPT dropped out from the 2019 EP elections due to internal infighting.)	3.8

== Voter turnout ==
The table below shows voter turnout throughout election day including voters from Overseas.

Turnout	Time								
Turnout	12:00			16:00			19:00		
Turnout	2014	2019	±	2014	2019	±	2014	2019	±
Total	12.14%	11.56%	▼0.58 pp	26.31%	23.37%	▼2.94 pp	33.67%	30.75%	▼2.92 pp

== Results ==
Party and European Parliament group		Votes	%	+/–	Seats	+/–
Socialist Party	S&D	1,104,694	33.40	+1.91	9	+1
Social Democratic Party	EPP	725,399	21.93		6	0
Left Bloc	GUE/NGL	325,093	9.83	+5.27	2	+1
Unitary Democratic Coalition	GUE/NGL	228,045	6.89	–5.80	2	–1
CDS – People's Party	EPP	204,792	6.19		1	0
People Animals Nature	G/EFA	168,015	5.08	+3.36	1	+1
Alliance	Renew	61,652	1.86	New	0	New
LIVRE	G/EFA	60,446	1.83	–0.35	0	0
Basta! (Note: Compared with the combined total of 0.91% of PPM and PPV/CDC in the 2014 EP elections.)	NI	49,388	1.49	+0.58	0	0
We, the Citizens!	Renew	34,634	1.05	New	0	–1
Liberal Initiative	Renew	29,114	0.88	New	0	New
Portuguese Workers' Communist Party	NI	27,211	0.82	–0.85	0	0
National Renewal Party	NI	16,135	0.49	+0.04	0	0
Democratic Republican Party	Renew	15,751	0.48	New	0	–1
United Party of Retirees and Pensioners	NI	13,508	0.41	New	0	New
Portuguese Labour Party	NI	8,412	0.25	–0.44	0	0
Socialist Alternative Movement	NI	6,612	0.20	–0.18	0	0
Total		3,078,901	100.00	–	21	0
Valid votes		3,078,901	93.08	+0.50		
Invalid votes		88,099	2.66	–0.38		
Blank votes		140,644	4.25	–0.13		
Total votes		3,307,644	100.00	–		
Registered voters/turnout		10,757,192	30.75	–2.92		
Source: Comissão Nacional de Eleições

Vote share
PS	33.40%
PSD	21.93%
BE	9.83%
CDU	6.89%
CDS-PP	6.19%
PAN	5.08%
Alliance	1.86%
L	1.83%
Basta!	1.49%
NC	1.05%
IL	0.88%
PCTP/MRPP	0.82%
Others	1.83%
Blank/Invalid	6.92%

Seats
PS	42.86%
PSD	28.57%
BE	9.52%
CDU	9.52%
CDS-PP	4.76%
PAN	4.76%

=== Distribution by European group ===
Summary of political group distribution in the 9th European Parliament (2019–2024)
Groups	Parties	Seats	Total	%
Progressive Alliance of Socialists and Democrats (S&D)	Socialist Party (PS)	9	9	42.86
European People's Party (EPP)	Social Democratic Party (PSD); People's Party (CDS–PP)	6; 1	7	33.33
European United Left–Nordic Green Left (GUE/NGL)	Portuguese Communist Party (PCP); Left Bloc (BE)	2; 2	4	19.05
Greens–European Free Alliance (G/EFA)	People–Animals–Nature (PAN)	1	1	4.76
Total		21	21	100.00

=== Maps ===
Most voted political force by municipality.

=== Electorate ===
Demographic	Size	PS	PSD	BE	CDU	CDS–PP	PAN	Others
Total vote	100%	33.4%	21.9%	9.7%	6.9%	6.2%	5.1%	16.8%
Sex
Men	47%	33.1%	22.2%	8.1%	8.1%	6.0%	4.0%	18.5%
Women	53%	33.6%	21.6%	11.3%	5.8%	6.4%	6.1%	15.2%
Age
18–24 years old	8%	22.2%	17.2%	9.9%	4.6%	6.6%	13.9%	25.5%
25–34 years old	10%	18.9%	17.9%	13.7%	5.5%	7.0%	11.2%	25.9%
35–44 years old	17%	26.0%	20.9%	12.1%	7.0%	6.7%	7.3%	20.0%
44–54 years old	21%	25.1%	24.6%	10.8%	7.7%	8.5%	4.4%	18.9%
55–64 years old	18%	38.0%	22.1%	11.3%	5.9%	5.9%	2.4%	14.3%
65 and older	26%	50.2%	23.4%	5.1%	8.0%	3.8%	1.1%	8.4%
Education
No High-school	14%	54.8%	17.9%	6.6%	6.7%	2.8%	2.1%	9.0%
High-school	34%	37.4%	20.2%	8.5%	8.2%	4.5%	4.9%	16.3%
College graduate	52%	24.9%	24.2%	11.6%	6.0%	8.3%	6.0%	19.1%
Source: CESOP–UCP exit poll

== See also ==
- 2019 European Parliament election
- Politics of Portugal
- List of political parties in Portugal
