= Results breakdown of the 2013 Portuguese local elections (municipal councils) =

This is the results breakdown of the Portuguese local elections, 2013 for the Municipal Councils held on 29 September 2013. The following tables show detailed results in each of the country's 18 districts and 2 autonomous regions and a table with the detailed results from the most populous cities in the country.

== National summary of votes and seats ==
Summary of the 29 September 2013 Municipal Councils elections results
Parties	Votes	%	±pp swing	Candidacies	Councillors		Mayors	
Parties	Votes	%	±pp swing	Candidacies	Total	±	Total	±
Socialist	1,812,029	36.26	▼1.4	302	923	▲2	149	▲17
Social Democratic	834,455	16.70	▼6.3	201	531	▼135	86	▼31
Democratic Unity Coalition	552,690	11.06	▲1.3	298	213	▲39	34	▲6
Social Democratic / People's	379,110	7.59	▼2.1	72	154	▼3	16	▼3
Independents	344,531	6.89	▲2.8	80	112	▲45	13	▲6
People's	152,073	3.04	▼0.1	150	47	▲16	5	▲4
Left Bloc	120,982	2.42	▼0.6	112	8	▼1	0	▼1
PSD / CDS–PP / MPT	100,437	2.01	▲2.0	4	11	▲2	0	0
PSD / CDS–PP / PPM	94,015	1.88	▲0.1	5	21	▲6	2	▲1
PSD / PPM	65,102	1.30	—	6	21	—	1	—
PSD / PPM / MPT	43,312	0.87	—	2	7	—	0	—
PSD/ CDS–PP / MPT / PPM	23,551	0.47	▼2.5	5	14	▼7	1	0
Portuguese Workers' Communist	23,276	0.47	▲0.3	27	0	0	0	0
PS / BE / PND / MPT / PTP / PAN	21,102	0.42	—	1	5	—	1	—
PSD / MPT / PPM	19,804	0.40	—	2	4	—	0	—
Party for Animals and Nature	16,233	0.32	—	12	0	—	0	—
CDS–PP / MPT / PPM	9,299	0.19	—	7	1	—	0	—
PSD/ CDS–PP / PPM / MPT	8,918	0.18	▼1.1	1	4	▼5	0	▼1
Labour	8,552	0.17	—	22	0	—	0	—
Earth	6,660	0.13	▼0.1	8	2	0	0	0
People's / Social Democratic	4,656	0.09	—	4	4	—	0	—
PPM / PND / PPV	3,634	0.07	—	3	0	—	0	—
National Renovator	3,002	0.06	▲0.1	6	0	0	0	0
People's / Earth	2,931	0.06	▲0.1	3	0	0	0	0
PS / PTP / PND / BE	2,157	0.04	—	1	1	—	0	—
Social Democratic / Earth	1,897	0.04	—	2	3	—	0	—
New Democracy	1,272	0.03	▼0.1	1	0	▼1	0	0
People's Monarchist / PPV	856	0.02	—	1	0	—	0	—
People's Monarchist	455	0.01	▼0.0	1	0	0	0	0
Portugal Pro-Life	338	0.01	—	1	0	—	0	—
Total valid	4,657,329	93.18	▼3.8	—	2,086	▲8	308	0
Blank ballots	193,471	3.87	▲2.2					
Invalid ballots	147,205	2.95	▲1.7					
Total (turnout 52.60%)	4,998,005	100.00	▼6.4					

=== Municipality map ===
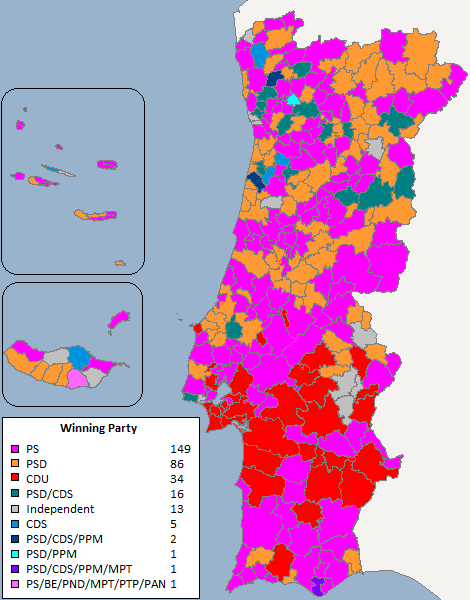
Most voted parties or coalitions in each Municipality.

=== Results by District ===
==== Aveiro ====
Summary of the 29 September 2013 Municipal Councils elections results in Aveiro
Parties	Votes	%	±pp swing	Candidacies	Councillors		Mayors	
Parties	Votes	%	±pp swing	Candidacies	Total	±	Total	±
Socialist	119,007	33.48	▼2.8	19	53	▲1	5	0
Social Democratic	114,943	32.34	▼4.1	15	56	▼6	9	▼2
People's	30,216	8.50	▲1.3	15	13	▲6	2	▲2
PSD / CDS–PP / PPM	16,694	4.70	—	4	5	—	1	—
Democratic Unity Coalition	14,503	4.08	▲1.0	19	0	0	0	0
Social Democratic / People's Party	12,152	3.42	▼6.2	2	6	▼8	1	0
Independents	11,835	3.33	▲1.5	4	5	▲1	1	▲1
Left Bloc	7,982	2.25	▼0.2	10	0	0	0	0
PSD/ CDS–PP / MPT / PPM	3,475	0.98	—	1	3	—	0	—
Portuguese Workers' Communist	235	0.07	—	1	0	—	0	—
National Renovator	123	0.03	—	1	0	—	0	—
Total valid	319,031	93.16	▼3.8	—	141	▲2	19	0
Blank ballots	14,778	4.16	▲2.3					
Invalid ballots	9,527	2.68	▲1.5					
Total (turnout 54.18%)	343,483	100.00	▼6.6					
Source: Autárquicas 2013 Resultados Oficiais

==== Beja ====
In Beja, despite gaining votes overall, the PS lost two mayorships to the CDU; Cuba, and the district's capital, Beja.

Summary of the 29 September 2013 Municipal Councils elections results in Beja
Parties	Votes	%	±pp swing	Candidacies	Councillors		Mayors	
Parties	Votes	%	±pp swing	Candidacies	Total	±	Total	±
Socialist	36,702	44.50	▲1.7	14	39	▼1	6	▼2
Democratic Unity Coalition	31,855	38.63	▼1.2	14	34	▲1	8	▲2
Social Democratic / People's Party	5,257	6.37	▲4.3	11	2	▲2	0	0
Independents	2,465	2.99	▲2.4	3	2	▲2	0	0
Social Democratic	1,746	2.12	▼5.4	2	1	▼3	0	0
Left Bloc	704	0.85	▼0.9	3	0	0	0	0
Total valid	78,729	95.46	▼1.6	—	78	▲1	14	0
Blank ballots	2,134	2.59	▲0.9					
Invalid ballots	1,607	1.95	▲0.7					
Total (turnout 62.35%)	82,545	100.00	▼2.6					
Source: Autárquicas 2013 Resultados Oficiais

==== Braga ====
In Braga, the PS gained the mayorship in Amares (from an Independent) and Barcelos (from a PSD/CDS-PP/PPM joint list), but lost two other mayorships, in Vieira do Minho and the capital city of Braga (to a PSD/CDS-PP joint list in Viera do Minho and a PSD/CDS-PP/PPM joint list in Braga.)

Summary of the 29 September 2013 Municipal Councils elections results in Braga
Parties	Votes	%	±pp swing	Candidacies	Councillors		Mayors	
Parties	Votes	%	±pp swing	Candidacies	Total	±	Total	±
Socialist	190,815	38.76	▼4.3	14	49	▼6	7	▼1
PSD / CDS–PP / PPM	70,632	14.35	▲6.4	2	10	▲5	1	▲1
Social Democratic / People's Party	60,578	12.31	▼0.0	5	19	▲3	2	▲1
Social Democratic	46,473	9.44	▼11.0	5	20	▼8	4	0
Independents	32,025	6.51	▲3.7	6	9	▲2	0	▼1
PSD / CDS–PP / MPT	31,174	6.33	—	1	4	—	0	—
Democratic Unity Coalition	24,563	4.99	▲0.4	14	2	▲1	0	0
Left Bloc	4,937	1.00	▼1.6	5	0	0	0	0
People's	4,926	1.00	▼2.3	5	1	▼1	0	0
Portuguese Workers' Communist	2,381	0.48	—	3	0	—	0	—
PPM / PPV	856	0.17	—	1	0	—	0	—
Earth	299	0.06	▼0.1	1	0	0	0	0
Total valid	469,659	95.4	▼2.2	—	114	0	14	0
Blank ballots	14,377	2.92	▲1.5					
Invalid ballots	8,267	1.68	▲0.8					
Total (turnout 62.61%)	492,650	100.00	▼5.2					
Source: Autárquicas 2013 Resultados Oficiais

==== Bragança ====
Bragança was one of the few districts where the PS had a net loss in mayorships, losing the mayorships in Freixo de Espada à Cinta and Torre de Moncorvo, but also gaining the mayorship in Mogadouro.

Summary of the 29 September 2013 Municipal Councils elections results in Bragança
Parties	Votes	%	±pp swing	Candidacies	Councillors		Mayors	
Parties	Votes	%	±pp swing	Candidacies	Total	±	Total	±
Socialist	33,727	37.23	▼1.0	12	31	▼4	5	▼1
Social Democratic	32,477	35.85	▲4.5	8	26	▲7	6	▲1
Social Democratic / People's Party	6,350	7.01	▼7.4	3	7	▼6	1	▲1
People's	5,225	5.77	▲0.6	6	3	▲1	0	0
Independents	3,308	3.65	▼1.5	1	1	▼2	0	0
People's Party / Social Democratic	2,426	2.68	—	1	2	—	0	—
Democratic Unity Coalition	1,824	2.01	▲0.2	12	0	0	0	0
Left Bloc	442	0.49	▼0.0	3	0	0	0	0
CDS–PP / MPT / PPM	92	0.10	—	1	0	—	0	—
Total valid	85,871	94.78	▼1.9	—	70	▼2	12	0
Blank ballots	2,403	2.65	▲1.1					
Invalid ballots	2,327	2.57	▲0.8					
Total (turnout 60.14%)	90,827	100.00	▼3.2					
Source: Autárquicas 2013 Resultados Oficiais

==== Castelo Branco ====
Summary of the 29 September 2013 Municipal Councils elections results in Castelo Branco
Parties	Votes	%	±pp swing	Candidacies	Councillors		Mayors	
Parties	Votes	%	±pp swing	Candidacies	Total	±	Total	±
Socialist	47,590	44.33	▼0.3	10	35	▼1	7	▲1
Social Democratic	29,351	27.34	▼13.7	9	22	▼9	4	▼1
Independents	11,182	10.41	—	4	5	—	0	—
Democratic Unity Coalition	6,836	6.37	▲2.2	11	1	▲1	0	0
People's	2,528	2.35	▼1.1	8	0	0	0	0
Left Bloc	1,163	1.08	▼0.5	2	0	0	0	0
Social Democratic / Earth Party	1,142	1.06	—	1	2	—	0	—
Labour	331	0.31	—	1	0	—	0	—
Total valid	100,123	93.26	▼3.2	—	65	▼2	11	0
Blank ballots	4,028	3.75	▲1.7					
Invalid ballots	3,215	2.99	▲1.4					
Total (turnout 57.98%)	107,486	100.00	▼4.5					
Source: Autárquicas 2013 Resultados Oficiais

==== Coimbra ====
Summary of the 29 September 2013 Municipal Councils elections results in Coimbra
Parties	Votes	%	±pp swing	Candidacies	Councillors		Mayors	
Parties	Votes	%	±pp swing	Candidacies	Total	±	Total	±
Socialist	89,884	42.24	▲4.5	17	61	▲5	12	▲3
Social Democratic	28,362	13.33	▼9.9	7	26	▼11	5	▲1
PSD / PPM / MPT	18,946	8.90	—	1	4	—	0	—
Democratic Unity Coalition	15,970	7.51	▲1.9	17	3	▲2	0	0
Social Democratic / People's Party	13,966	6.56	▲0.4	5	12	0	0	▼2
PSD/ CDS–PP / PPM / MPT	8,918	4.19	—	4	4	—	0	—
Independents	8,766	4.12	▼2.6	4	4	▼1	0	0
PSD / CDS–PP / PPM	3,960	1.86	▼10.5	1	3	▼3	0	0
People's	3,767	1.77	▲1.4	8	0	0	0	0
Left Bloc	2,260	1.06	▼1.8	5	0	0	0	0
Party for Animals and Nature	925	0.43	—	1	0	—	0	—
Portuguese Workers' Communist	838	0.39	—	2	0	—	0	—
Earth	555	0.26	—	1	0	—	0	—
Total valid	197,117	92.64	▼3.9	—	117	0	17	0
Blank ballots	9,777	4.60	▲2.5					
Invalid ballots	5,877	2.95	▲1.8					
Total (turnout 53.86%)	212,926	100.00	▼6.5					
Source: Autárquicas 2013 Resultados Oficiais

==== Évora ====
The CDU won one of its most important victories in Évora, recapturing the district's capital city, and historic CDU stronghold, of Évora. The CDU had held the city from 1979 to 1997, when it was captured by the Socialists. CDU General Secretary Jerónimo de Sousa flew into Évora to celebrate with the city's incoming mayor, Carlos Pinto de Sá, on election night.

Summary of the 29 September 2013 Municipal Councils elections results in Évora
Parties	Votes	%	±pp swing	Candidacies	Councillors		Mayors	
Parties	Votes	%	±pp swing	Candidacies	Total	±	Total	±
Democratic Unity Coalition	32,153	38.50	▲4.4	14	30	▲4	6	▲2
Socialist	27,767	33.25	▼6.6	14	31	▼5	5	▼2
Independents	9,217	11.04	▲2.7	7	12	▲3	3	▲2
Social Democratic / People's Party	5,384	6.45	▲4.8	4	3	▲1	0	0
Social Democratic	2,922	3.50	▼7.5	7	2	▼3	0	0
Left Bloc	991	1.19	▲0.1	2	0	0	0	0
People's	550	0.66	▼0.3	3	0	0	0	0
People's Party / Social Democratic	340	0.41	—	2	0	—	0	—
Total valid	79,324	94.99	▼2.1	—	78	0	14	0
Blank ballots	2,573	3.08	▲1.2					
Invalid ballots	1,615	1.93	▲0.8					
Total (turnout 58.05%)	83,581	100.00	▼3.7					
Source: Autárquicas 2013 Resultados Oficiais

==== Faro ====
In Faro there was a massive upswing in support for the CDU, including having the only mayorship, Silves, that swung directly from the PSD to the CDU.

Summary of the 29 September 2013 Municipal Councils elections results in Faro
Parties	Votes	%	±pp swing	Candidacies	Councillors		Mayors	
Parties	Votes	%	±pp swing	Candidacies	Total	±	Total	±
Socialist	65,434	36.71	▼4.7	16	51	▲2	10	▲3
Social Democratic	44,208	24.08	▼7.5	14	33	▼10	4	▼3
Democratic Unity Coalition	20,919	11.74	▲5.7	16	8	▲7	1	▲1
PSD/ CDS–PP / MPT / PPM	12,823	7.19	▼2.8	2	7	0	1	0
Left Bloc	7,707	4.32	▲0.3	9	2	▲1	0	0
Independents	6,534	3.67	▲2.7	7	2	▲1	0	0
CDS–PP / MPT / PPM	4,082	2.29	—	2	1	—	0	—
People's	1,272	0.71	▼0.9	5	0	0	0	0
People's Party / Earth Party	730	0.41	—	1	0	—	0	—
Portuguese Workers' Communist	364	0.20	▲0.1	1	0	0	0	0
Portugal Pro-Life	338	0.19	—	1	0	—	0	—
Total valid	164,602	92.71	▼3.3	—	104	▲2	16	0
Blank ballots	8,318	4.67	▲1.9					
Invalid ballots	5,325	2.99	▲1.8					
Total (turnout 47.57%)	178,312	100.00	▼9.1					
Source: Autárquicas 2013 Resultados Oficiais

==== Guarda ====
Summary of the 29 September 2013 Municipal Councils elections results in Guarda
Parties	Votes	%	±pp swing	Candidacies	Councillors		Mayors	
Parties	Votes	%	±pp swing	Candidacies	Total	±	Total	±
Socialist	41,150	39.72	▼6.8	13	36	▼3	6	▲2
Social Democratic / People's Party	25,993	25.09	▲15.7	5	16	▲9	3	▲2
Social Democratic	19,937	19.24	▼13.3	9	25	▼9	4	▼2
Democratic Unity Coalition	3,262	3.15	▲0.8	14	0	0	0	0
People's	2,441	2.36	▲0.4	6	2	▲2	0	0
Independents	2,231	2.15	▲1.0	3	3	▲2	1	▲1
Left Bloc	871	0.84	▲0.2	1	0	0	0	0
Portuguese Workers' Communist	576	0.56	▲0.4	1	0	0	0	0
People's Monarchist	455	0.44	—	1	0	—	0	—
Labour	279	0.27	—	2	0	—	0	—
Total valid	97,195	93.82	▼2.6	—	82	▲1	14	0
Blank ballots	3,263	3.15	▲1.4					
Invalid ballots	3,144	3.03	▲1.3					
Total (turnout 61.74%)	103,844	100.00	▼3.2					
Source: Autárquicas 2013 Resultados Oficiais

==== Leiria ====
Summary of the 29 September 2013 Municipal Councils elections results in Leiria
Parties	Votes	%	±pp swing	Candidacies	Councillors		Mayors	
Parties	Votes	%	±pp swing	Candidacies	Total	±	Total	±
Social Democratic	75,989	35.56	▼9.4	16	50	▼10	9	▼2
Socialist	71,804	33.60	▲0.1	16	43	▲5	6	▲2
Democratic Unity Coalition	18,537	8.67	▼0.0	16	7	▼1	1	0
People's	14,849	6.95	▲1.8	15	5	▲1	0	0
Independents	7,131	3.34	▲2.0	6	4	▲4	0	0
Left Bloc	3,830	1.79	▼0.7	6	0	0	0	0
Earth	430	0.20	—	1	0	—	0	—
National Renovator	219	0.10	—	1	0	—	0	—
Total valid	192,789	90.22	▼6.0	—	109	▼3	16	0
Blank ballots	12,649	5.92	▲3.5					
Invalid ballots	8,249	3.86	▲2.5					
Total (turnout 50.39%)	213,797	100.00	▼7.0					
Source: Autárquicas 2013 Resultados Oficiais

==== Lisbon ====
The PS and CDU both won key victories in Lisbon. The PS retained the district (and national) capital of Lisbon, with the best result ever achieved by any political party in Lisbon, and the CDU recaptured their historical stronghold of Loures from the PS.

Summary of the 29 September 2013 Municipal Councils elections results in Lisbon
Parties	Votes	%	±pp swing	Candidacies	Councillors		Mayors	
Parties	Votes	%	±pp swing	Candidacies	Total	±	Total	±
Socialist	319,109	37.51	▼2.7	15	70	▲1	9	▲1
Democratic Unity Coalition	133,033	15.64	▲3.2	15	27	▲8	2	▲1
PSD / CDS–PP / MPT	68,101	8.01	—	2	6	—	0	—
Independents	63,081	7.42	▲3.8	5	10	▲5	1	0
Social Democratic	49,076	5.77	▲1.6	5	19	▲2	2	▼1
Social Democratic / People's Party	44,692	5.25	▲0.2	3	12	▲1	1	0
Left Bloc	34,907	4.10	▼0.5	10	0	0	0	0
PSD / MPT / PPM	19,804	2.33	—	4	4	—	0	—
Portuguese Workers' Communist	9,902	1.16	▲0.6	7	0	0	0	0
Party for Animals and Nature	9,418	1.11	—	3	0	—	0	—
PSD/ CDS–PP / MPT / PPM	7,253	0.85	▼14.1	2	4	▼11	0	0
People's	6,847	0.80	▲0.2	4	0	0	0	0
CDS–PP / MPT / PPM	5,125	0.60	—	4	0	—	0	—
PPM / PPV / PND	3,443	0.40	—	2	0	—	0	—
Labour	3,172	0.37	▲0.3	7	0	0	0	0
National Renovator	2,634	0.31	▲0.2	4	0	0	0	0
New Democracy	1,272	0.15	—	1	0	—	0	—
Total valid	780,869	91.79	▼5.2	—	152	▲16	15	0
Blank ballots	39,778	4.68	▲2.9					
Invalid ballots	30,014	3.53	▲2.3					
Total (turnout 44.51%)	850,795	100.00	▼7.6					
Source: Autárquicas 2013 Resultados Oficiais

==== Portalegre ====
Summary of the 29 September 2013 Municipal Councils elections results in Portalegre
Parties	Votes	%	±pp swing	Candidacies	Councillors		Mayors	
Parties	Votes	%	±pp swing	Candidacies	Total	±	Total	±
Socialist	28,368	43.32	▼1.7	15	37	▼2	6	0
Democratic Unity Coalition	11,306	17.26	▲0.7	15	15	▲2	2	▼1
Social Democratic	10,115	15.44	▼7.8	11	22	▼1	6	0
Independents	5,662	8.65	▲3.4	4	4	0	1	▲1
Social Democratic / People's Party	2,704	4.13	▼0.8	3	1	▼1	0	0
People's	1,599	2.44	▲1.4	4	1	▲1	0	0
Earth	1,430	2.18	▲1.9	1	1	▲1	0	0
PSD / PPM	686	1.05	—	1	0	—	0	—
Left Bloc	658	1.00	▼0.1	4	0	0	0	0
Total valid	62,528	95.48	▼1.8	—	81	0	15	0
Blank ballots	1,599	2.44	▲0.8					
Invalid ballots	1,365	2.95	▲0.9					
Total (turnout 63.14%)	65,561	100.00	▼3.6					
Source: Autárquicas 2013 Resultados Oficiais

==== Porto ====
Summary of the 29 September 2013 Municipal Councils elections results in Porto
Parties	Votes	%	±pp swing	Candidacies	Councillors		Mayors	
Parties	Votes	%	±pp swing	Candidacies	Total	±	Total	±
Socialist	316,597	35.71	▲1.3	18	71	▲5	8	▲2
Social Democratic / People's Party	130,219	14.69	▼12.7	7	29	▼10	4	0
Independents	125,325	14.14	▲4.0	11	18	▲3	2	▲2
Social Democratic	66,994	7.56	▼8.8	6	19	▼21	3	0
PSD / PPM	61,840	6.98	—	4	18	—	1	—
Democratic Unity Coalition	54,291	6.12	▲1.3	18	5	▲4	0	0
PSD / PPM / MPT	24,366	2.75	—	1	3	—	0	—
Left Bloc	23,553	2.66	▲0.1	13	0	0	0	0
People's	14,198	1.60	▲0.1	9	1	0	0	0
Portuguese Workers' Communist	3,056	0.34	▲0.2	4	0	0	0	0
Labour	2,130	0.24	—	4	0	—	0	—
Total valid	822,569	92.78	▼4.6	—	164	▲2	18	0
Blank ballots	34,306	3.87	▲2.4					
Invalid ballots	29,705	3.35	▲2.2					
Total (turnout 55.82%)	886,823	100.00	▼7.8					
Source: Autárquicas 2013 Resultados Oficiais

==== Santarém ====
Summary of the 29 September 2013 Municipal Councils elections results in Santarém
Parties	Votes	%	±pp swing	Candidacies	Councillors		Mayors	
Parties	Votes	%	±pp swing	Candidacies	Total	±	Total	±
Socialist	80,363	37.51	▼0.1	21	61	▼3	13	▲4
Social Democratic	36,667	17.11	▼12.3	12	23	▼10	4	▼1
Democratic Unity Coalition	30,292	14.14	▲1.9	21	23	▲5	3	0
Social Democratic / People's Party	19,220	8.97	▲4.9	6	12	▲5	1	0
Independents	15,430	7.20	▲1.1	11	8	▲2	0	0
Left Bloc	8,419	3.93	▼0.8	11	4	▼1	0	0
People's	4,578	2.14	▼0.3	11	0	0	0	0
Earth	1,369	0.64	—	1	0	—	0	—
PSD / CDS–PP / MPT	1,162	0.54	—	1	1	—	0	—
Social Democratic / Earth Party	755	0.35	—	1	1	—	0	—
People's Party / Earth Party	210	0.10	▲0.0	1	0	0	0	0
Total valid	198,465	92.62	▼4.1	—	133	0	21	0
Blank ballots	8,906	4.16	▲2.3					
Invalid ballots	6,889	3.22	▲1.8					
Total (turnout 53.68%)	214,401	100.00	▼6.3					
Source: Autárquicas 2013 Resultados Oficiais

==== Setúbal ====
Summary of the 29 September 2013 Municipal Councils elections results in Setúbal
Parties	Votes	%	±pp swing	Candidacies	Councillors		Mayors	
Parties	Votes	%	±pp swing	Candidacies	Total	±	Total	±
Democratic Unity Coalition	125,588	41.49	▼0.6	13	56	▲4	11	▲2
Socialist	78,909	26.07	▼2.1	13	36	▼1	2	▼2
Social Democratic	25,504	8.43	▼2.8	9	7	0	0	0
Left Bloc	16,694	5.51	▼1.1	11	2	▼1	0	0
Social Democratic / People's Party	8,925	2.95	▲1.6	3	3	▲1	0	0
Independents	5,963	1.97	▲0.7	4	4	0	0	0
People's	5,804	1.92	▼2.4	9	1	▲1	0	0
Portuguese Workers' Communist	5,150	1.70	▲0.0	6	0	0	0	0
Party for Animals and Nature	3,562	1.18	—	4	0	—	0	—
Labour	1,699	0.56	—	4	0	—	0	—
Total valid	277,798	91.77	▼5.1	—	109	▲4	13	0
Blank ballots	13,736	4.54	▲2.7					
Invalid ballots	11,178	3.35	▲2.4					
Total (turnout 41.67%)	302,767	100.00	▼7.9					
Source: Autárquicas 2013 Resultados Oficiais

==== Viana do Castelo ====
Summary of the 29 September 2013 Municipal Councils elections results in Viana do Castelo
Parties	Votes	%	±pp swing	Candidacies	Councillors		Mayors	
Parties	Votes	%	±pp swing	Candidacies	Total	±	Total	±
Socialist	55,148	37.50	▼4.2	10	30	▼5	6	0
Social Democratic	45,600	31.00	▲6.4	10	25	▲2	2	▼1
People's	19,021	12.93	▼0.1	4	7	▲1	1	0
Democratic Unity Coalition	8,030	5.46	▲1.6	10	1	▲1	0	0
Independents	7,570	5.15	▲4.7	3	5	▲1	1	▲1
People's Party / Earth Party	1,991	1.35	—	1	0	—	0	—
Portuguese Workers' Communist	744	0.51	—	1	0	—	0	—
Party for Animals and Nature	659	0.44	—	1	0	—	0	—
Total valid	138,754	94.34	▼2.6	—	68	▲4	10	0
Blank ballots	5,239	3.56	▲1.7					
Invalid ballots	3,087	2.10	▲1.0					
Total (turnout 57.32%)	147,288	100.00	▼3.4					
Source: Autárquicas 2013 Resultados Oficiais

==== Vila Real ====
Summary of the 29 September 2013 Municipal Councils elections results in Vila Real
Parties	Votes	%	±pp swing	Candidacies	Councillors		Mayors	
Parties	Votes	%	±pp swing	Candidacies	Total	±	Total	±
Socialist	54,731	40.74	▲1.7	14	42	▲3	8	▲2
Social Democratic	54,054	40.24	▼3.0	12	37	▲3	6	▲1
Independents	5,749	4.28	—	3	3	—	0	—
Democratic Unity Coalition	4,242	3.16	▲0.6	14	0	0	0	0
People's	3,434	2.56	▼1.8	9	0	▼2	0	0
Social Democratic / People's Party	2,870	2.14	▼5.9	1	2	▼9	0	0
People's Party / Social Democratic	1,890	1.41	—	1	2	—	0	—
Left Bloc	603	0.45	▼0.3	1	0	0	0	0
Earth	145	0.11	▼0.1	1	0	0	0	0
Portuguese Workers' Communist	29	0.02	0	1	0	0	0	0
Total valid	127,747	95.09	▼1.9	—	86	▲2	14	0
Blank ballots	3,436	2.56	▲1.0					
Invalid ballots	3,161	2.35	▲0.9					
Total (turnout 57.79%)	134,541	100.00	▼2.9					
Source: Autárquicas 2013 Resultados Oficiais

==== Viseu ====
Summary of the 29 September 2013 Municipal Councils elections results in Vila Real
Parties	Votes	%	±pp swing	Candidacies	Councillors		Mayors	
Parties	Votes	%	±pp swing	Candidacies	Total	±	Total	±
Socialist	85,026	39.33	▲3.1	24	70	▲6	11	▲3
Social Democratic	63,998	29.60	▼12.9	15	52	▼17	10	▼1
Social Democratic / People's Party	33,017	15.27	▲5.9	9	26	▲9	3	0
People's	9,689	4.48	▲0.3	14	2	0	0	0
Democratic Unity Coalition	5,954	2.75	▲0.9	24	0	0	0	0
Left Bloc	2,607	1.21	▲0.2	6	0	0	0	0
Independents	2,393	1.11	▲0.1	2	2	▲2	0	0
Earth	234	0.11	▼0.4	1	0	0	0	0
Total valid	202,918	93.86	▼3.1	—	152	0	24	0
Blank ballots	7,270	3.36	▲1.9					
Invalid ballots	6,000	2.78	▲1.3					
Total (turnout 57.03%)	216,465	100.00	▼5.4					
Source: Autárquicas 2013 Resultados Oficiais

==== Madeira ====
Summary of the 29 September 2013 Municipal Councils elections results in Madeira
Parties	Votes	%	±pp swing	Candidacies	Councillors		Mayors	
Parties	Votes	%	±pp swing	Candidacies	Total	±	Total	±
Social Democratic	47,207	34.81	▼17.2	11	33	▼14	4	▼6
PS / BE / PND / MPT / PTP / PAN	21,102	15.56	—	1	5	—	1	—
People's	17,679	13.04	▲4.7	9	8	▲4	1	▲1
Independents	16,738	12.34	▲7.7	4	9	▲6	2	▲2
Socialist	11,636	8.58	▼9.1	7	13	▼1	3	▲3
Democratic Unity Coalition	7,243	5.34	▲0.8	11	1	0	0	0
Earth	2,198	1.62	▼1.9	1	1	0	0	0
PS / PTP / PND / BE	2,157	1.59	—	1	1	—	0	—
Party for Animals and Nature	1,657	1.22	—	3	0	—	0	—
Labour	941	0.69	—	5	0	—	0	—
Left Bloc	516	0.38	▼2.2	5	0	0	0	0
Total valid	129,074	95.17	▼2.1	—	71	▲1	11	0
Blank ballots	1,678	1.24	▲0.2					
Invalid ballots	4,870	3.59	▲1.9					
Total (turnout 52.52%)	135,676	100.00	▼2.5					
Source: Autárquicas 2013 Resultados Oficiais

==== Azores ====
Summary of the 29 September 2013 Municipal Councils elections results in Azores
Parties	Votes	%	±pp swing	Candidacies	Councillors		Mayors	
Parties	Votes	%	±pp swing	Candidacies	Total	±	Total	±
Socialist	56,977	46.62	▼0.3	19	62	▲4	13	▲2
Social Democratic	38,149	31.22	▼12.5	14	33	▼17	4	▼3
Social Democratic / People's Party	7,810	6.39	—	2	4	—	0	—
People's	3,205	2.62	▼1.6	6	3	▲2	1	▲1
PSD / CDS–PP / PPM	2,729	2.23	—	1	3	—	0	—
PSD / PPM	2,414	1.98	—	1	3	—	0	—
Democratic Unity Coalition	2,105	1.72	▲0.0	8	0	0	0	0
Left Bloc	2,070	1.69	▲0.4	5	0	0	0	0
Independents	1,961	1.60	—	3	3	—	1	—
Total valid	117,420	96.08	▼1.7	—	111	▲2	19	0
Blank ballots	3,086	2.53	▲1.3					
Invalid ballots	1,702	1.39	▲0.4					
Total (turnout 54.01%)	122,364	100.00	▼2.8					
Source: Autárquicas 2013 Resultados Oficiais

==== Results by municipality ====
The table shows the results in the 20 District capitals plus Vila Nova de Gaia, Sintra, Oeiras and Matosinhos cities with over 100,000 inhabitants which are not district capitals.

Municipality	Party	Votes	%	Seats	+/-
Aveiro; 9 seats	PSD/CDS–PP	16,694	48.63%	5	▼1
Aveiro; 9 seats	PS	8,372	24.39%	3	=
Aveiro; 9 seats	Independent list	3,480	10.14%	1	▲1
Beja; 7 seats	CDU	7,438	43.42%	4	▲1
Beja; 7 seats	PS	7,135	41.65%	3	▼1
Braga; 11 seats	PSD/CDS–PP/PPM	44,571	46.71%	6	▲1
Braga; 11 seats	PS	31,326	32,83%	4	▼2
Braga; 11 seats	CDU	8.355	8.76%	1	▲1
Bragança; 7 seats	PSD	9,449	47.24%	4	=
Bragança; 7 seats	PS	5,204	26.20%	2	=
Bragança; 7 seats	Independent lists	3,308	16.54%	1	=
Castelo Branco; 9 seats	PS	16,104	61.87%	7	▼1
Castelo Branco; 9 seats	PSD	5,207	20.00%	2	▲1
Coimbra; 11 seats	PS	22,631	35.51%	5	▲1
Coimbra; 11 seats	PSD/PPM/MPT	18,946	29.73%	4	▼2
Coimbra; 11 seats	CDU	7,078	11,11%	1	=
Coimbra; 11 seats	Independent lists	5,906	9,27%	1	▲1
Évora; 7 seats	CDU	11,776	49.30%	4	▲1
Évora; 7 seats	PS	6,199	25.95%	2	▼1
Évora; 7 seats	PSD/CDS–PP	3,510	14,70%	1	=
Faro; 9 seats	PSD/CDS–PP/PPM/MPT	8,306	33.94%	4	▼1
Faro; 9 seats	PS	7,911	32.32%	4	=
Faro; 9 seats	CDU	3,122	12.76%	1	▲1
Funchal; 11 seats	PS/BE/PND/MPT/PTP/PAN	21,102	39.22%	5	▲3
Funchal; 11 seats	PSD	17,450	32.43%	4	▼3
Funchal; 11 seats	CDS–PP	7.828	14.55%	1	=
Funchal; 11 seats	CDU	4.504	8.37%	1	=
Guarda; 7 seats	PSD/CDS–PP	12,222	51.43%	5	▲3
Guarda; 7 seats	PS	7,223	30.39%	2	▼3
Leiria; 11 seats	PS	26,166	46.31%	7	▲2
Leiria; 11 seats	PSD	15,735	27.85%	4	▼1
Leiria; 11 seats	CDS–PP	2,639	4.67%	0	▼1
Lisbon; 17 seats	PS	116,425	50.91%	11	▲2
Lisbon; 17 seats	PSD/CDS–PP/MPT	51,156	22.37%	4	▼3
Lisbon; 17 seats	CDU	22,519	9.85%	2	▲1
Matosinhos; 11 seats	Independent lists	32,014	43.41%	6	▲6
Matosinhos; 11 seats	PS	18,629	25.26%	3	▼2
Matosinhos; 11 seats	PSD	6,869	9.31%	1	▼1
Matosinhos; 11 seats	CDU	5,396	7.32%	1	▲1
Oeiras; 11 seats	Independent lists	23,071	33.45%	5	=
Oeiras; 11 seats	PSD	13,215	19.16%	3	▲1
Oeiras; 11 seats	PS	12.638	18.32%	2	▼1
Oeiras; 11 seats	CDU	6,309	9.15%	1	=
Ponta Delgada; 9 seats	PSD	14,604	49.81%	5	▼1
Ponta Delgada; 9 seats	PS	12,269	41.84%	4	▲1
Portalegre; 7 seats	Independent lists	5,514	42.44%	4	▲4
Portalegre; 7 seats	PS	3,104	23.89%	2	▼1
Portalegre; 7 seats	CDU	2,275	17.51%	1	=
Portalegre; 7 seats	PSD/CDS–PP	1,377	10.60%	0	▼3
Porto; 13 seats	Independent lists	45,411	39.25%	6	▲6
Porto; 13 seats	PS	26,237	22.68%	3	▼2
Porto; 13 seats	PSD/PPM/MPT	24,366	21.06%	3	▼4
Porto; 13 seats	CDU	8,539	7.38%	1	=
Santarém; 9 seats	PSD	11,196	40.31%	4	▼3
Santarém; 9 seats	PS	8,962	32.27%	4	▲2
Santarém; 9 seats	CDU	2,872	10.34%	1	▲1
Setúbal; 11 seats (2 more than in the 2009 elections)	CDU	16,801	41.93%	6	▲1
Setúbal; 11 seats (2 more than in the 2009 elections)	PS	10,583	26.41%	3	▲1
Setúbal; 11 seats (2 more than in the 2009 elections)	PSD/CDS–PP	5,150	12.85%	1	=
Sintra; 11 seats	PS	32,984	26.83%	4	=
Sintra; 11 seats	Independent lists	31,246	25.42%	4	▲4
Sintra; 11 seats	PSD/CDS–PP/MPT	16,945	13.79%	2	▼4
Sintra; 11 seats	CDU	15,362	12.50%	1	=
Viana do Castelo; 9 seats	PS	22,183	47.67%	5	=
Viana do Castelo; 9 seats	PSD	12,361	26.56%	3	▼1
Viana do Castelo; 9 seats	CDU	4,919	10.57%	1	▲1
Vila Real; 9 seats (2 more than in the 2009 elections)	PS	13,467	44.00%	5	▲2
Vila Real; 9 seats (2 more than in the 2009 elections)	PSD	12,926	42.23%	4	=
Vila Nova de Gaia; 11 seats	PS	53,146	38.15%	5	▲2
Vila Nova de Gaia; 11 seats	PSD/CDS–PP	27,813	19.97%	3	▼5
Vila Nova de Gaia; 11 seats	Independent lists	27,494	19.74%	3	▲3
Viseu; 9 seats	PSD	21,402	46.37%	5	▼2
Viseu; 9 seats	PS	12,386	26.84%	3	▲1
Viseu; 9 seats	CDS–PP	4,414	9.56%	1	▲1
