= 2021 Portuguese Social Democratic Party leadership election =

2021 Social Democratic Party leadership election
- 27 November 2021
- Turnout: 78.2% ▼0.8 pp
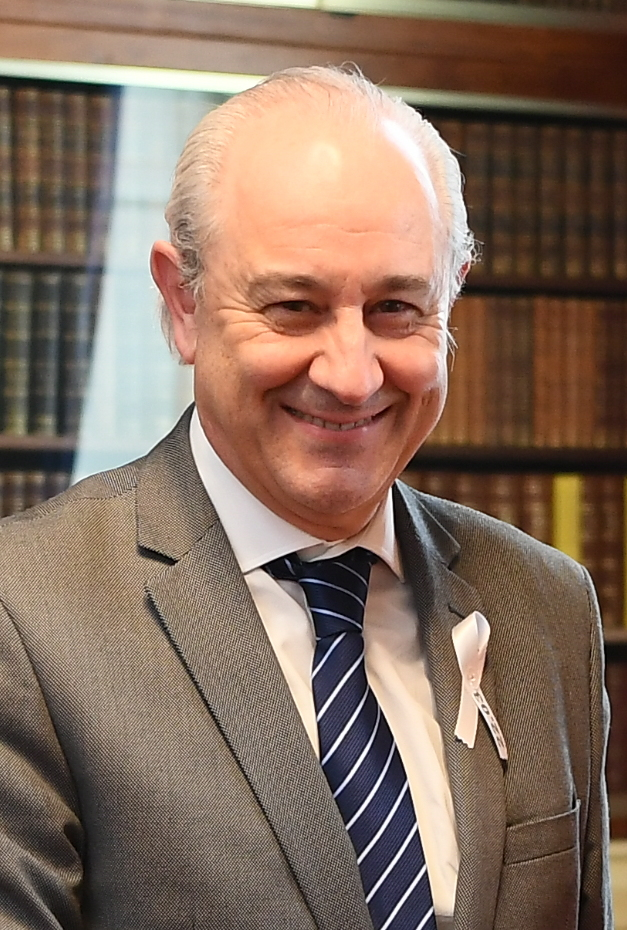

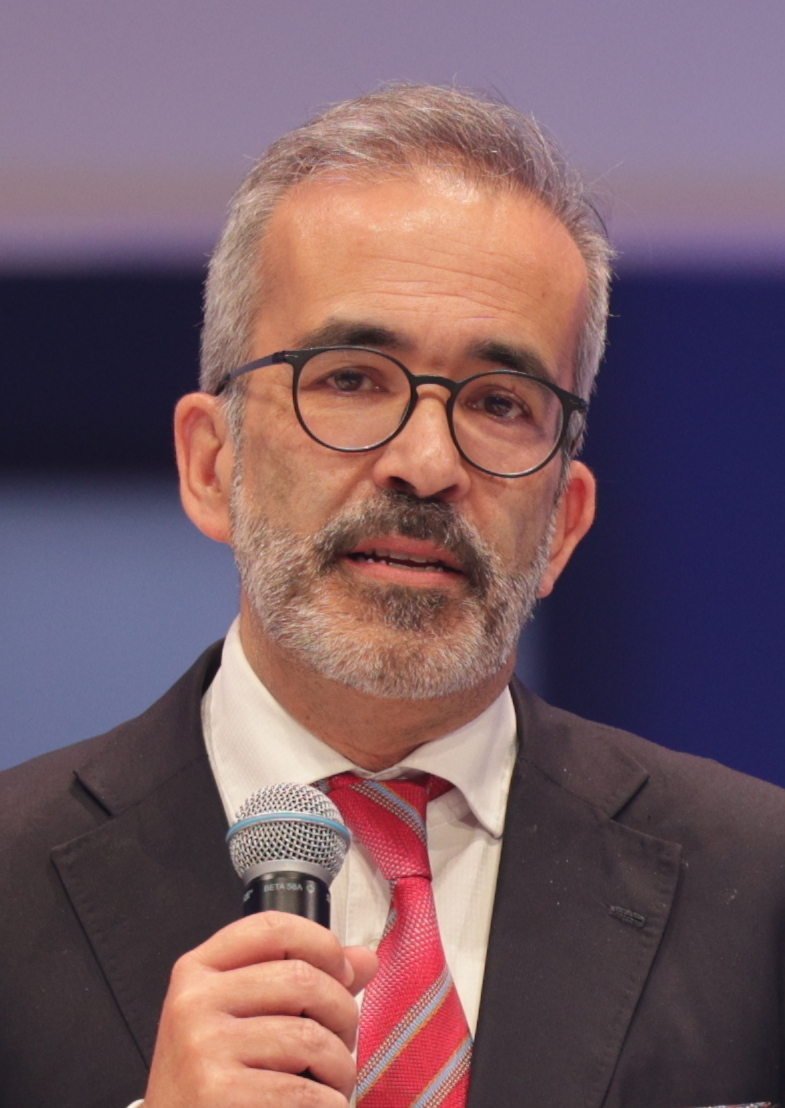
Candidate	Rui Rio	Paulo Rangel
Popular vote	18,852	17,106
Percentage	52.4%	47.6%
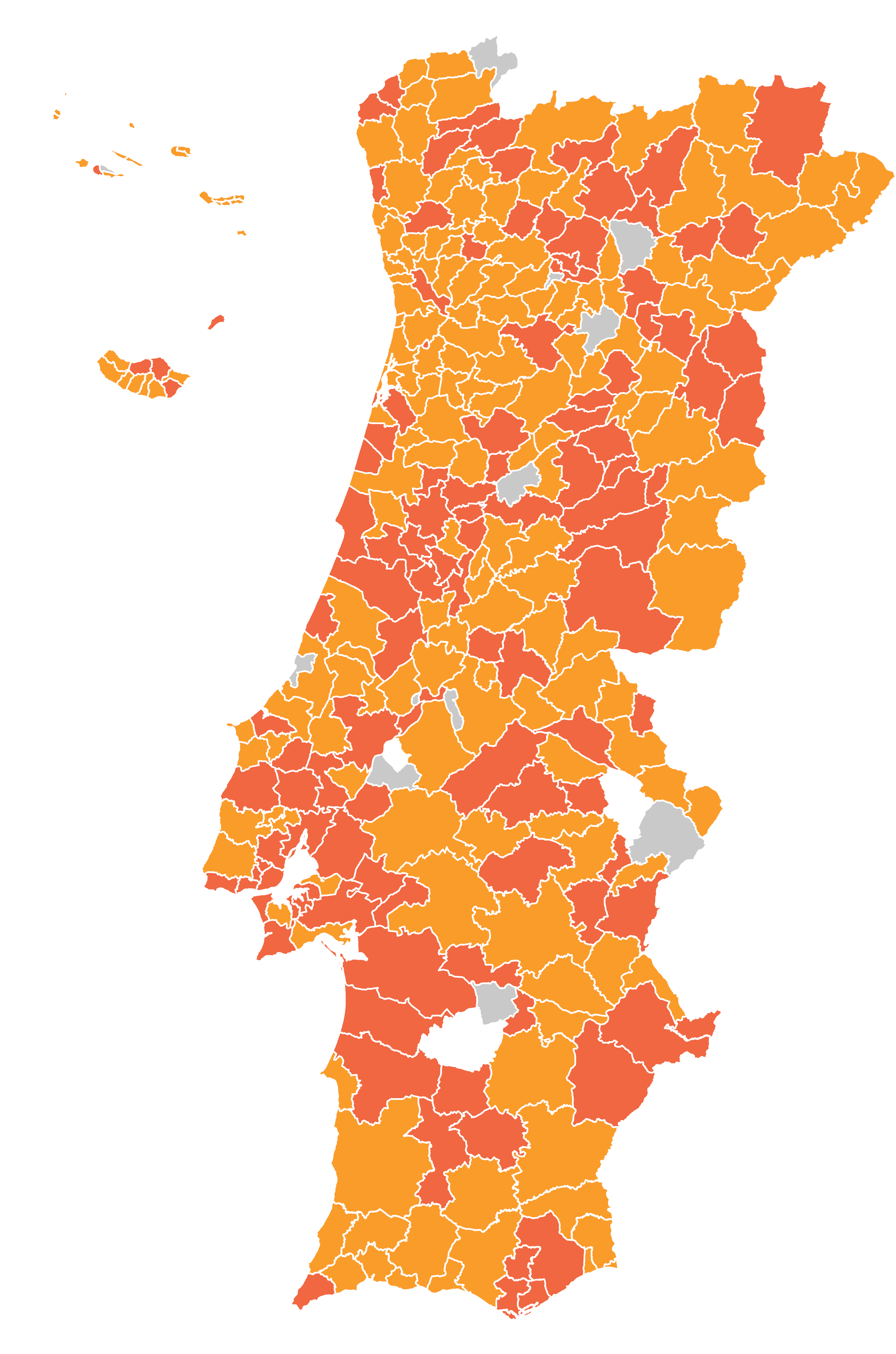
- Results by municipality. Rio Rangel Tie
Leader before election
Rui Rio
Elected Leader
Rui Rio

The 2021 Portuguese Social Democratic Party leadership election was held on 27 November. If no candidate achieved more than 50% of the votes in the first round, a second round would be held between the two most voted candidates in the first round on 1 December, however, as only two candidates will be on the ballot, a second round will not be necessary. The original date for the first round was 4 December, but the party decided to advance the date by a week. Nearly 47,000 party members, out of more than 85,000 active members, were registered to vote.

One issue identified during the campaign was the rise of the far-right Chega!. Though neither candidate said they would invite the party into government, Rio signalled he would be open to negotiating with them on a case-by-case basis, while Rangel ruled this out, saying he would only negotiate with CDS – People's Party and Liberal Initiative.

Rui Rio defeated Paulo Rangel by a 52.4% to 47.6% margin and was reelected for a 3rd term as party leader. He led the party into the 2022 snap general elections, which he lost, losing 2 seats in the Assembly of the Republic and that resulted in an absolute majority to the Socialist Party.

== Candidates ==
Name	Born	Experience	Announcement date	Ref.
Paulo Rangel	18 February 1968 (age 53); Vila Nova de Gaia	Member of the European Parliament (2009–2024); Leader of the Social Democratic Parliamentary Caucus (2008–2009); Member of Parliament for Porto (2005–2009)	15 October 2021	
Rui Rio	6 August 1957 (age 64); Porto	President of the Social Democratic Party (2018–2022); Leader of the Opposition (2018–2022); Member of Parliament for Porto (2019–2022); Mayor of Porto (2001–2013); Member of Parliament for Porto (1991–2002)	19 October 2021	

=== Withdrew ===
- Nuno Miguel Henriques – incumbent city councillor in Alenquer (2021–2025) and failed candidate for the PSD leadership in 2012;

=== Declined ===
- Pedro Passos Coelho – former Prime Minister (2011–2015) and PSD leader (2010–2018);
- Luís Montenegro – former PSD caucus leader (2011–2017) and candidate for the party's leadership in 2020;
- Miguel Pinto Luz – Deputy mayor of Cascais (2017–2024) and candidate for the party's leadership in 2020;
- Miguel Poiares Maduro – former Minister for Regional Development (2013–2015);
- Jorge Moreira da Silva – former Environment Minister (2013–2015);

== Opinion polls ==
=== All voters ===
Polling firm/Commissioner	Fieldwork date	Sample size			Others /Undecided	Lead
Polling firm/Commissioner	Fieldwork date	Sample size	Rui Rio	Paulo Rangel	Others /Undecided	Lead
Intercampus	5–11 Nov 2021	612	49.3	34.3	16.3	15
CESOP–UCP	29 Oct–4 Nov 2021	878	43	32	25	11
Aximage	28–31 Oct 2021	803	38	31	31	7

=== PSD voters ===
Polling firm/Commissioner	Fieldwork date	Sample size			Others /Undecided	Lead
Polling firm/Commissioner	Fieldwork date	Sample size	Rui Rio	Paulo Rangel	Others /Undecided	Lead
Pitagórica	10–15 Nov 2021	?	58	27	15	31
CESOP–UCP	29 Oct–4 Nov 2021	?	48	41	11	7
Aximage	28–31 Oct 2021	?	54	37	9	17

Hypothetical polling

Polling firm/Commissioner	Fieldwork date	Sample size	Rui Rio	Luís Montenegro	Miguel Pinto Luz	Paulo Rangel	Pedro Passos Coelho	Miguel Poiares Maduro	Jorge Moreira da Silva	Pedro Duarte	Others /Undecided	Lead
Intercampus	14–23 Sep 2021	609	—N/a	15.8	3.0	34.3	27.8	—N/a	5.4	3.6	10.2	6.5
Intercampus	13–20 Aug 2021	612	8.8	10.3	—N/a	17.3	16.5	7.8	—N/a	—N/a	39.2	0.8

== Results ==
Summary of the November 2021 PSD leadership election results
Candidate	27 November 2021	
Candidate	Votes	%
Rui Rio	18,852	52.43
Paulo Rangel	17,106	47.57
Total	35,958	
Valid votes	35,958	98.58
Invalid and blank ballots	518	1.42
Votes cast / turnout	36,476	78.17
Registered voters	46,664	
Sources: Official results

Vote share
Rui Rio	52.43%
Paulo Rangel	47.57%

=== Results by party federation ===
The following table shows a breakdown of the results of the election by party federation, which are mostly equal to the electoral circles.

Result breakdown of the 2021 Portuguese Social Democratic Party leadership election
Federation	Rui Rio		Paulo Rangel		Invalid ballots	Votes cast	Registered
Federation	Votes	%	Votes	%	Invalid ballots	Votes cast	Registered
Algarve	511	53.56	443	46.44	18	972	1,354
Aveiro	2,301	61.16	1,401	37.84	85	3,787	4,575
Baixo Alentejo	109	38.38	175	61.62	1	285	337
Braga	2,615	52.31	2,384	47.69	78	5,077	6,419
Bragança	664	62.11	405	37.89	9	1,078	1,321
Castelo Branco	280	47.22	313	52.78	13	606	820
Coimbra	632	46.13	738	53.87	26	1,396	1,838
Évora	208	52.53	188	47.47	5	401	514
Guarda	417	35.82	747	64.18	9	1,173	1,420
Leiria	705	54.06	599	45.94	14	1,318	1,990
Lisbon: Urban Area	1,703	40.30	2,523	59.70	64	4,290	6,033
Lisbon: Oeste	130	45.61	155	54.39	4	289	385
Portalegre	106	48.62	112	51.38	5	223	285
Porto	3,821	59.32	2,620	40.68	69	6,510	7,930
Santarém	574	54.56	478	45.44	18	1,070	1,403
Setúbal	371	36.05	658	63.95	14	1,043	1,300
Viana do Castelo	616	57.95	447	42.05	15	1,078	1,259
Vila Real	543	37.68	898	62.32	22	1,463	1,814
Viseu	835	54.61	694	45.39	22	1,551	1,882
Azores	485	77.60	140	22.40	11	636	796
Madeira	1,183	57.01	892	42.99	14	2,089	2,797
Europe	36	35.29	66	64.71	2	104	150
Outside of Europe	7	18.92	30	81.08	0	37	42

== See also ==
- Social Democratic Party (Portugal)
- List of political parties in Portugal
- Elections in Portugal
