= Paulo Rangel =

Portuguese jurist and politician (born 1968)

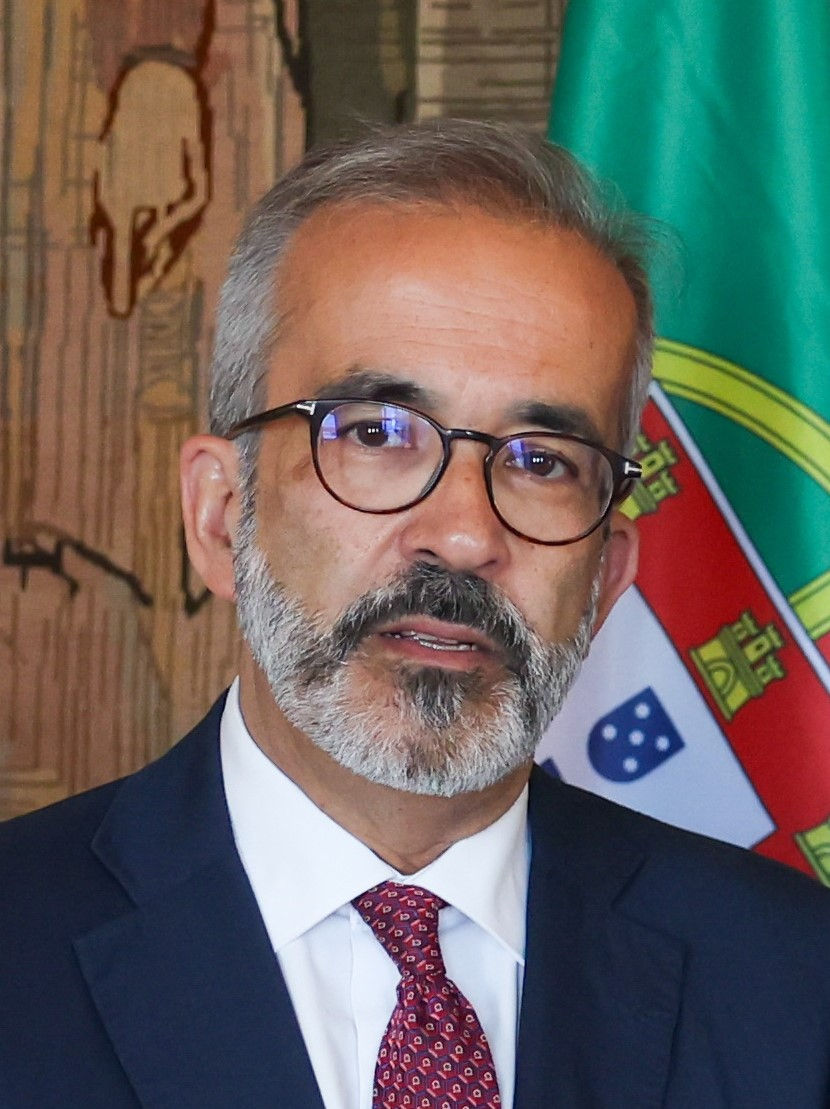
- Rangel in 2025

Minister of State and Foreign Affairs
- Incumbent
- Assumed office 2 April 2024
- Prime Minister: Luís Montenegro
- Preceded by: João Gomes Cravinho

Member of the European Parliament for Portugal
- In office 14 July 2009 – 1 April 2024
- Succeeded by: Ana Miguel dos Santos

Vice President of the Social Democratic Party
- In office 3 July 2022 – 19 October 2024
- President: Luís Montenegro
- Preceded by: Ana Paula Martins
- Succeeded by: Leonor Beleza

Member of the Assembly of the Republic
- In office 10 March 2005 – 13 July 2009
- Constituency: Porto

Secretary of State Adjunct to the Minister of Justice
- In office 17 July 2004 – 12 March 2005
- Prime Minister: Pedro Santana Lopes
- Minister: José Pedro Aguiar-Branco
- Preceded by: João Mota de Campos
- Succeeded by: José Manuel Conde Rodrigues

President of the Parliamentary Group of the Social Democratic Party
- In office 26 June 2008 – 13 July 2009
- President: Manuela Ferreira Leite
- Preceded by: Pedro Santana Lopes
- Succeeded by: António Montalvão Machado

Personal details
- Born: Paulo Artur dos Santos Castro de Campos Rangel; 18 February 1968 (age 58) Vila Nova de Gaia, Portugal
- Party: Social Democratic Party (2005–present)
- Other political affiliations: CDS – People's Party (1996–1999)
- Education: Portuguese Catholic University
- Occupation: Jurist • Politician

Paulo Artur dos Santos Castro de Campos Rangel (born 18 February 1968) is a Portuguese jurist and politician of the Social Democratic Party (PSD) who has been Minister of Foreign Affairs since 2024, in the XXIV Constitutional Government, led by Luís Montenegro.

Previously, Rangel served as a Member of the European Parliament between 2009 and 2024. He also serves as treasurer of the European People's Party under the leadership of its president Manfred Weber.

== Political career ==
=== Member of the European Parliament, 2009–2024 ===
Rangel was a Member of the European Parliament (MEP) from the 2009 European elections. Ahead of the 2014 European elections, the PSD named Rangel at the top of their list. In the 2019 European elections, he served as his party's lead candidate again.

In parliament, Rangel served on the Committee on Constitutional Affairs from 2009. In that capacity, he drafted the parliament's 2010 report on the framework agreement between the European Commission and the Parliament, which demanded that MEPs should be allowed to participate in international negotiations that lead to accords that need parliamentary backing. In 2014, he became the committee's vice-chairman. He became a member of the Working Group on the Conference on the Future of Europe.

In 2019, Rangel also joined Committee on Civil Liberties, Justice and Home Affairs. In this capacity, he served as the parliament's rapporteur on Croatia's accession to the Schengen zone.

In addition to his committee assignments, Rangel served on the parliament's delegations for to the ACP–EU Joint Parliamentary Assembly (2017–2019) and for relations with the United States (2019–2014), Brazil (2014–2017), Bosnia and Herzegovina, and Kosovo (2021–2024), and Montenegro (2021–2024).

Upon entering the parliament, Rangel was chosen as one of the vice-presidents of the European People's Party Group. Within the European People's Party, he chaired the Working Group on EPP Membership from 2016. In this capacity, he notably decided to suspend the Fidesz party in 2020. In 2021, he was also appointed to the EPP group's task force for proposing changes to its rules of procedure to allow for "the possibility of the collective termination of membership of a group of Members rather than just individual membership", alongside Esteban González Pons, Jan Olbrycht, Esther de Lange and Othmar Karas.

=== Role in national politics ===
During his time in parliament, Rangel launched a bid for the leadership of the PSD in 2010 but ultimately came second and lost against Pedro Passos Coelho. In 2021, he again announced his candidacy for the leadership of the PSD and demanded a more assertive opposition to Prime Minister António Costa's Socialist government; in the vote held in November 2021, he was defeated by incumbent Rui Rio.

== Other activities ==
- RAR Group, Chairman of the Board of the Shareholders' General Meeting
- Associação Comercial do Porto (ACP), Member of the Board

== Personal life ==
In 2021, Paulo Rangel publicly came out as gay.

== Electoral history ==
=== European Parliament election, 2009 ===
Ballot: 7 June 2009
| Party | Candidate | Votes | % | Seats | +/− |
|---|---|---|---|---|---|
| PSD | Paulo Rangel | 1,131,744 | 31.7 | 8 | +1 |
| PS | Vital Moreira | 946,818 | 26.5 | 7 | –5 |
| BE | Miguel Portas | 382,667 | 10.7 | 3 | +2 |
| CDU | Ilda Figueiredo | 379,787 | 10.6 | 2 | ±0 |
| CDS–PP | Nuno Melo | 298,423 | 8.4 | 2 | ±0 |
| MEP | Laurinda Alves | 55,072 | 1.5 | 0 | new |
| PCTP/MRPP | Orlando Alves | 42,940 | 1.2 | 0 | ±0 |
| Other parties | | 95,744 | 2.7 | 0 | ±0 |
| Blank/Invalid ballots | | 235,748 | 6.6 | – | – |
| Turnout | | 3,568,943 | 36.78 | 22 | –2 |
Source: Comissão Nacional de Eleições

=== PSD leadership election, 2010 ===
Ballot: 26 March 2010
| Candidate | Votes | % |
|---|---|---|
| Pedro Passos Coelho | 31,671 | 61.2 |
| Paulo Rangel | 17,821 | 34.4 |
| José Pedro Aguiar Branco | 1,769 | 3.4 |
| Castanheira Barros | 138 | 0.3 |
| Blank/Invalid ballots | 349 | 0.7 |
| Turnout | 51,748 | 66.26 |
Source: Resultados

=== European Parliament election, 2014 ===
Ballot: 25 May 2014
| Party | Candidate | Votes | % | Seats | +/− |
|---|---|---|---|---|---|
| PS | Francisco Assis | 1,034,249 | 31.5 | 8 | +1 |
| PSD/CDS–PP | Paulo Rangel | 910,647 | 27.7 | 7 | –3 |
| CDU | João Ferreira | 416,925 | 12.7 | 3 | +1 |
| MPT | Marinho e Pinto | 234,788 | 7.2 | 2 | +2 |
| BE | Marisa Matias | 149,764 | 4.6 | 1 | –2 |
| Livre | Rui Tavares | 71,495 | 2.2 | 0 | new |
| PAN | Orlando Figueiredo | 56,431 | 1.7 | 0 | new |
| PCTP/MRPP | Leopoldo Mesquita | 54,708 | 1.7 | 0 | ±0 |
| Other parties | | 111,765 | 3.4 | 0 | ±0 |
| Blank/Invalid ballots | | 243,681 | 7.4 | – | – |
| Turnout | | 3,284,452 | 33.67 | 21 | –1 |
Source: Comissão Nacional de Eleições

=== European Parliament election, 2019 ===
Ballot: 26 May 2019
| Party | Candidate | Votes | % | Seats | +/− |
|---|---|---|---|---|---|
| PS | Pedro Marques | 1,104,694 | 33.4 | 9 | +1 |
| PSD | Paulo Rangel | 725,399 | 21.9 | 6 | ±0 |
| BE | Marisa Matias | 325,093 | 9.8 | 2 | +1 |
| CDU | João Ferreira | 228,045 | 6.9 | 2 | –1 |
| CDS–PP | Nuno Melo | 204,792 | 6.2 | 1 | ±0 |
| PAN | Francisco Guerreiro | 168,015 | 5.1 | 1 | +1 |
| Alliance | Paulo Sande | 61,652 | 1.9 | 0 | new |
| Livre | Rui Tavares | 60,446 | 1.8 | 0 | ±0 |
| Basta! | André Ventura | 49,388 | 1.5 | 0 | new |
| NC | Paulo de Morais | 34,634 | 1.1 | 0 | new |
| Other parties | | 116,743 | 2.7 | 0 | ±0 |
| Blank/Invalid ballots | | 235,748 | 3.5 | – | – |
| Turnout | | 3,307,644 | 30.75 | 21 | ±0 |
Source: Comissão Nacional de Eleições

=== PSD leadership election, 2021 ===
Ballot: 27 November 2021
| Candidate | Votes | % |
|---|---|---|
| Rui Rio | 18,852 | 52.4 |
| Paulo Rangel | 17,106 | 47.6 |
| Blank/Invalid ballots | 518 | – |
| Turnout | 36,476 | 78.17 |
Source: Resultados
