= Pedro Marques (politician) =

Portuguese politician (born 1976)

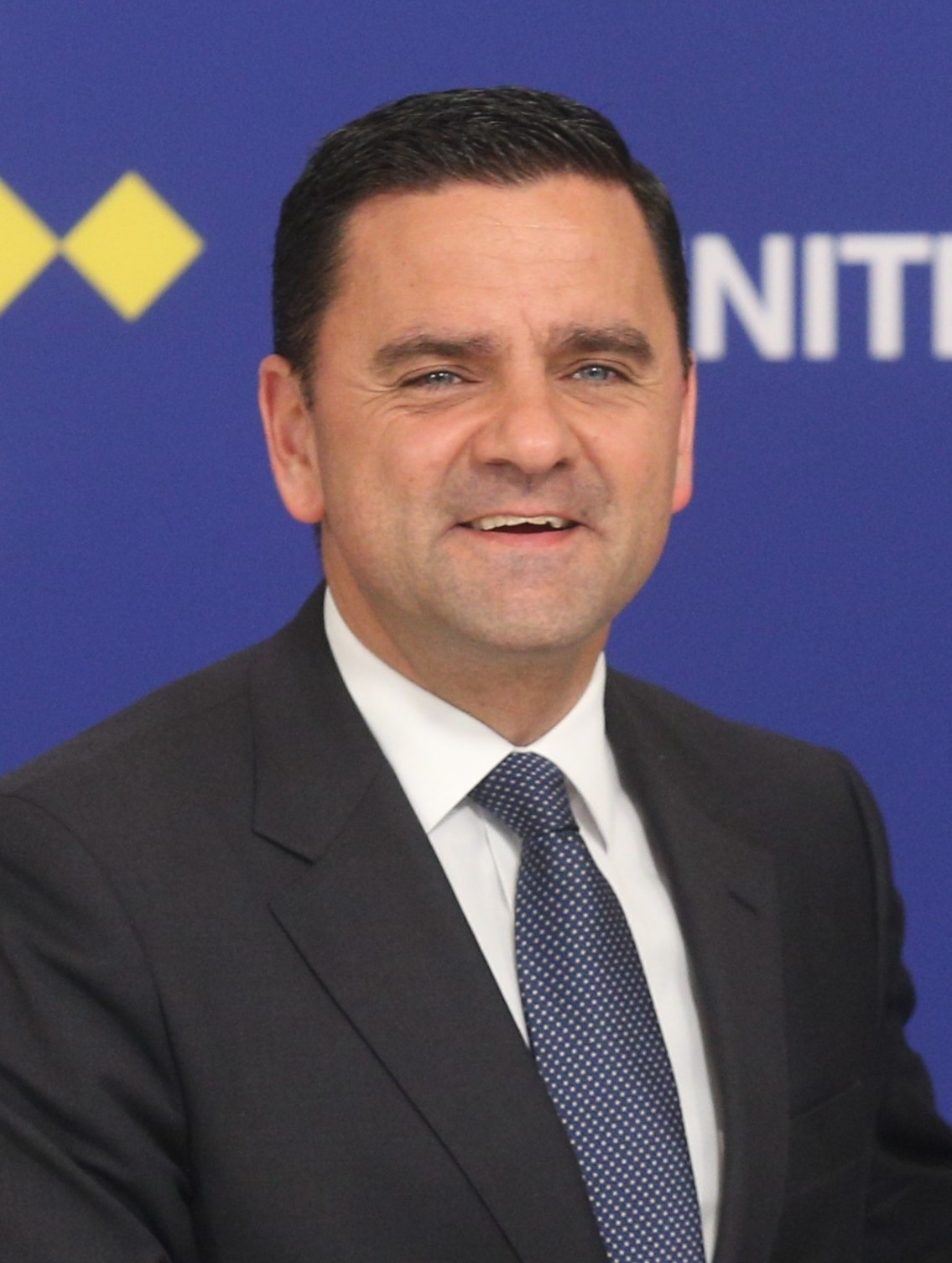

Member of the European Parliament
- In office 1 July 2019 – 15 July 2024
- Constituency: Portugal

Minister of Planning and Infrastructure
- In office 26 November 2015 – 18 February 2019
- Prime Minister: António Costa
- Preceded by: Jorge Moreira da Silva (Planning); Álvaro Santos Pereira (Infrastructure)
- Succeeded by: Nelson de Souza (Planning); Pedro Nuno Santos (Infrastructure)

Member of the Assembly of the Republic
- In office 2009–2014
- Constituency: Setúbal

Personal details
- Born: 1 August 1976 (age 49) Lisbon, Portugal
- Party: Socialist Party
- Other political affiliations: Progressive Alliance of Socialists and Democrats

Pedro Manuel Dias de Jesus Marques (born 1976) is a Portuguese politician of the Socialist Party (PS) who has been serving as Member of the European Parliament between 2019 until July 2024. He was the vice-president for the Group of the Progressive Alliance of Socialists and Democrats in the European Parliament. He previously served as Secretary of State for Social Security, between 2005 and 2011, and as Minister of Planning and Infrastructure in the government of Prime Minister António Costa, between 2015 and 2019.

== Education and early professional career ==
After completing a bachelor's degree in economics at the Lisbon School of Economics and Management (ISEG) in 1997, he joined the Technical Support Structure for the Operational Intervention of Urban Renovation. In 1999, he completed a master's degree in International Economics, while working as a Senior Consultant at CISED Consultores.

== Work in national politics ==
In 2002, as a result of political intervention in his municipality, Montijo, he was elected councilor of the Municipality of Montijo, with the responsibilities of Social Action and Health, Social Housing, Planning and Economic Development.

He was invited by the Minister of Labor and Social Solidarity, José António Vieira da Silva, to integrate the XVII Constitutional Government, in 2005. He performed the duties of Secretary of State for Social Security until 2011. During this time he was deeply linked to the Social Security reform of 2007, widely praised by the European Union and the OECD, and the implementation of the PARES Program, which led to the duplication of social facilities throughout the country.

After being elected deputy to the Assembly of the Republic in the XI Legislature for the constituency of Setúbal, he repeated the election in the XII Legislature, this time for the constituency of Portalegre. He served as vice-president of the Parliamentary Group of the Socialist Party until 2014, when he returned to the private sector to join Capgemini Portugal.

Following his involvement, as coordinator of the Agenda for the Decade, he was invited by the Prime Minister António Costa to integrate the XXI Constitutional Government. In November 2015, he took office as Minister of Planning and Infrastructure, having had responsibilities in areas such as Structural Funds, the repurchase of the majority of the public position in TAP or the preparation of the investment plan for the modernization of the national railway, Ferrovia 2020 program. In his capacity as Minister of Planning and Infrastructure, he renegotiated Portugal's structural and cohesion funds as part of an multiannual program — called Portugal 2020 — and started discussions on the following period between 2021 and 2027.

== Work at the European level, 2019–2024 ==
In 2019, the Socialist Party put Marques at the head of its list for the European elections. The party won the elections by a wide margin and elected 9 deputies to the European Parliament.

In the European Parliament, Marques integrates the committees AFET (External Affairs), ECON (Economic and Monetary Affairs), FISC (Subcommittee on Fiscal Affairs), the Delegation for Relations with the Maghreb Countries and the Arab Maghreb Union, including the Parliamentary Committees Joint EU-Morocco, EU-Tunisia and EU-Algeria and the Delegation for Relations with India. He worked directly on the creation of the Just Transition Fund, on the creation of the European Anti-Money Laundering Authority, among others. During the COVID-19 pandemic he was also an active advocate of helicopter money.

In 2020, Marques succeeded Miriam Dalli was elected vice-chair of the S&D Group, under the leadership of chairwoman Iratxe García, having been re-elected in December 2021. Currently, his areas of responsibility include Social Affairs, Foreign Affairs and Communication.

== Electoral history ==
=== European Parliament election, 2019 ===
Ballot: 26 May 2019
Party	Candidate	Votes	%	Seats	+/−
PS	Pedro Marques	1,104,694	33.4	9	+1
PSD	Paulo Rangel	725,399	21.9	6	±0
BE	Marisa Matias	325,093	9.8	2	+1
CDU	João Ferreira	228,045	6.9	2	–1
CDS–PP	Nuno Melo	204,792	6.2	1	±0
PAN	Francisco Guerreiro	168,015	5.1	1	+1
Alliance	Paulo Sande	61,652	1.9	0	new
Livre	Rui Tavares	60,446	1.8	0	±0
Basta!	André Ventura	49,388	1.5	0	new
NC	Paulo de Morais	34,634	1.1	0	new
Other parties		116,743	2.7	0	±0
Blank/Invalid ballots		235,748	3.5	–	–
Turnout		3,307,644	30.75	21	±0
Source: Comissão Nacional de Eleições
