= Citizenship and Christian Democracy =

Citizenship and Christian Democracy Cidadania e Democracia Cristã
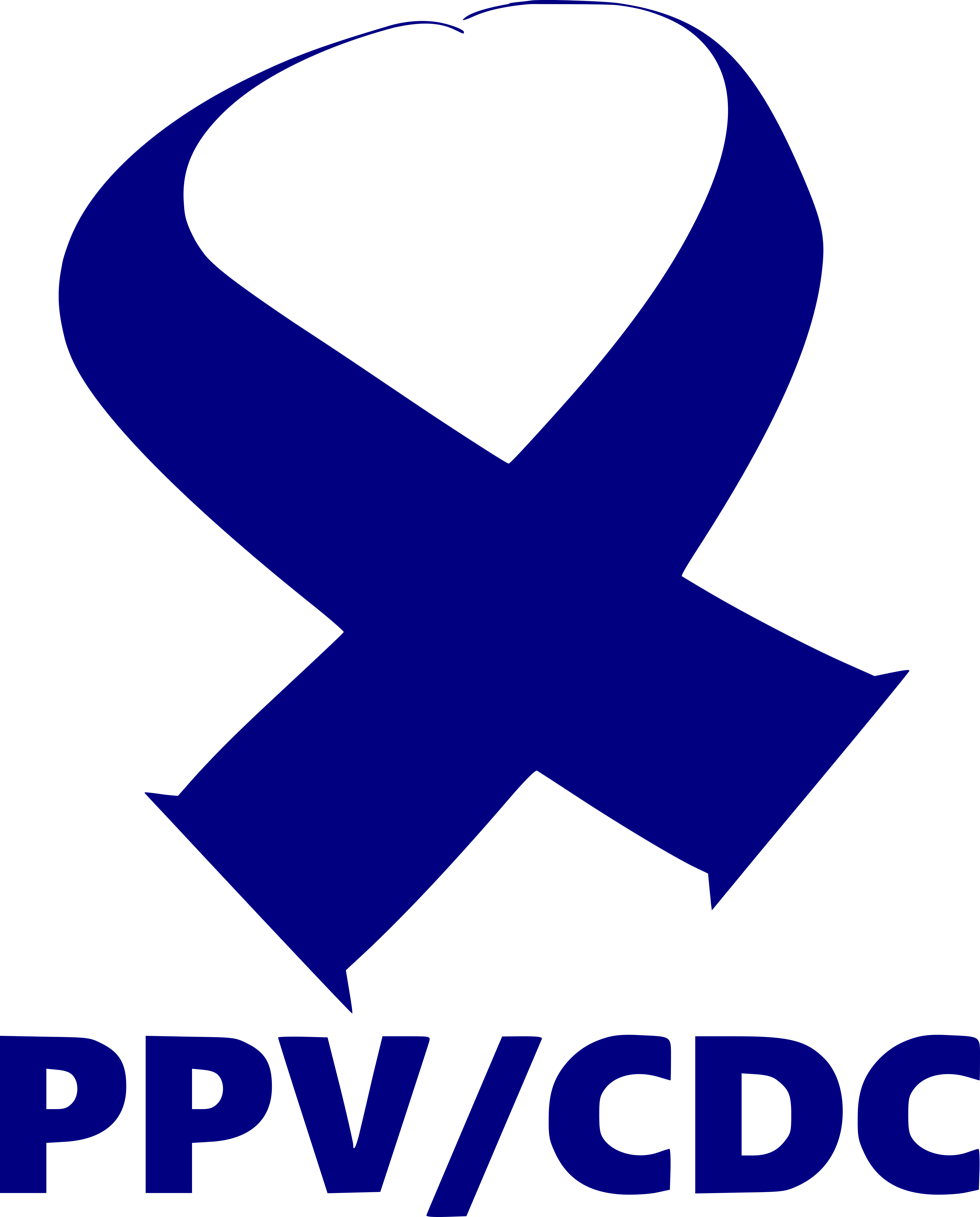
- Leader: Joana Câmara Pereira
- Founded: 1 July 2009
- Dissolved: 27 August 2020
- Merged into: Chega
- Headquarters: Rua 24 de Junho, n.º 1497 4800-076 Guimarães
- Ideology: Conservatism; Social conservatism Christian right Catholic social teaching Confessionalism of the state Right-wing populism Euroscepticism
- Political position: Right-wing
- National affiliation: Basta!
- Colours: Navy blue

Website
- Official Portugal pro Vida blog

The Citizenship and Christian Democracy (Portuguese: Cidadania e Democracia Cristã, PPV/CDC) was a Portuguese minor right-wing political party, with an ideological foundation of anti-abortion, conservatism and the Christian right. PPV was approved by the Constitutional Court on 1 July 2009 and defended the principles of the social doctrine of the Church.

Composed by people from all political persuasions, although mostly from the conservative right, the Portugal Pro-Life presented its programme of policy proposals around the unconditional defense of life, understanding the concept of life and the various principles inherent to it as advocates Catholic Church doctrine, and Roman Catholicism as a state religion. On 27 August 2020, it was announced that the party would officially merge with Chega, after running together in the legislative and European elections of 2019.

== History ==
The party was born after the 2007 Portuguese abortion referendum, aiming to be a platform for the anti-abortion movement. It was founded in 2009 with the name Partido Portugal Pró-Vida (Portugal Pro-Life Party), PPV. Its first leader was Luís Botelho Ribeiro.

In 2009, the PPV/CDC advocated the repeal of the abortion law and of the then recent amendments to the law of divorce, the prohibition of euthanasia, the revision of standards on sex education in schools so that parents have an active voice, the opposition to same-sex marriage, no age limit for voting (see youth suffrage), and that taxpayers should be able to determine how their taxes are spent.

In 2014, in the context of the European elections, the party (with its main candidate, Acácio Valente) held a demonstration in front of the Clínica dos Arcos clinic in Lisbon, a private clinic licensed to conduct abortions. The candidate was also part of a debate in the Universidade da Beira Interior.

Sérgio Cales was the party's main candidate during the 2015 legislative election. In 2015, Manuel Matias became the party's leader. In the same year, the party changed its designation to Partido Cidadania e Democracia Cristã and its initials to CDC-PPV.

In 2019, the party was part of a coalition for the 2019 European Parliament election, Basta!, along with Chega, the People's Monarchist Party and a movement called Democracy 21. The party justified its participation in the coalition as an attempt to "save Portugal from cultural Marxism". Later that year, the party entered into a broad agreement with Chega, which included PPV/CDC members in its lists. PPV/CDC's then leader, Manuel Matias, ran as the head of Chega's list for Braga.

== Election results ==
=== Assembly of the Republic ===
Election	Assembly of the Republic			Government	Size	Leader
Election	Votes	%	Seats won	Government	Size	Leader
2009	8,461	0.15%	0 / 230	No seats	13th	Luís Botelho Ribeiro
2011	8,209	0.15%	0 / 230	No seats	14th	Luís Botelho Ribeiro
2015	2,685	0.05%	0 / 230	No seats	19th	Joana Câmara Pereira
2019 within Chega	67,502	1.29%	1 / 230	No seats (Note: None of the CDC/PPV members within Chega lists were elected, the only person elected was Chega's own leader.)	7th	André Ventura

=== European Parliament ===
Election	European Parliament			Size	Leader
Election	Votes	%	Seats won	Size	Leader
2014	12,008	0.37%	0 / 21	14th	Acácio Valente
2019 Basta! coalition	49,496	1.49%	0 / 21	9th	André Ventura

== See also ==
- Christian Democratic Party (1975–2004)
- Catholic Centre Party (1915–1940)
