= Basta! (coalition) =

Enough! Basta!
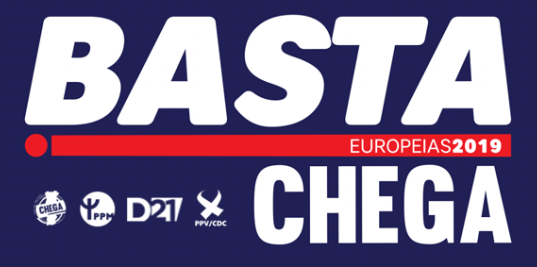
- Leader: André Ventura
- Founded: 12 April 2019
- Dissolved: 30 July 2019
- Ideology: Portuguese nationalism; Right-wing populism; Monarchism
- Political position: Right-wing to far-right
- Member parties: Chega; People's Monarchist Party; Citizenship and Christian Democracy; Former: Democracy 21

Basta! (lit. 'Enough!') was a right-wing populist party coalition in Portugal, formed by the political party Chega, the People's Monarchist Party, and the Citizenship and Christian Democracy party. The Democracy 21 movement was also a part of the coalition on the European elections, but decided to quit shortly after because of the proposal of the Citizenship and Christian Democracy party to revoke the law permitting abortion.

The coalition was formed in order to participate in the 2019 European elections, joining several formations from the Portuguese political right. The coalition embodies the wide range of ideologies advocated by the different parties that make it up: the conservatism defended by all, the populism and nationalism of the Chega party, the monarchism of the People's Monarchist Party, the Christian democracy of the Citizenship and Christian Democracy party and the economic liberalism defended by the Democracy 21 political movement.

== History ==
The plans for the coalition started in March 2019 when the Chega party was not approved at the Constitutional Court of Portugal. André Ventura wanted to participate in the European elections, and, as he thought the party would not be approved before the elections, he had the idea to join the People's Monarchist Party and the Citizenship and Christian Democracy party in order to be able to participate in the European elections.

Meanwhile, Chega was approved as a political party. On 1 April 2019, the parties asked for the first time to the Constitutional Court to run together in a single list under the name Chega (another way of saying "Enough", synonym for Basta). Such a coalition was rejected by the Court because it couldn't bear the same name of one of its member parties. A slightly different name was put forward, Coligação Chega ("Enough Coalition"), but it was also refused for the same reason. The following proposal, Europa Chega (literally "Europe Enough"; for it to have any meaning such as "Enough Europe" or "Enough, Europe" it would have to be "Chega de Europa" and "Europa, Chega", respectively), submitted on 10 April, was also rejected, because of the same issue.

On 12 April, Ventura admitted he would no longer be the leader of the coalition if it was rejected one more time by the Constitutional Court. This time, the Coligação Basta (Enough Coalition; Basta being just another way of saying "Enough") was approved.

== Member parties ==
| Party/movement | Leader | Ideology | Spectre |
|---|---|---|---|
| Chega | André Ventura | National conservatism and right-wing populism | Right-wing to far-right |
| People's Monarchist Party | Gonçalo da Câmara Pereira | Monarchism | Right-wing |
| Citizenship and Christian Democracy Party | Manuel Matias | Christian democracy | Right-wing |

== Electoral results ==
=== European Parliament ===
| Election | Leader | Votes | % | Seats | +/– | EP Group |
|---|---|---|---|---|---|---|
| 2019 | André Ventura | 49,388 | 1.5 (#9) | 0 / 21 | New | – |
