= People's Youth =

People's Youth may refer to:

- People's Youth (Indonesia), the youth wing of the Communist Party of Indonesia
- People's Youth (Portugal), the youth wing of the Democratic and Social Centre – People's Party
- People's Youth (Slovakia), the youth wing of the Kotleba – People's Party Our Slovakia
