= 10th Legislature of the Third Portuguese Republic =

←	9th Legislature	11th Legislature	→

Overview
- Legislative body: Assembly of the Republic
- Meeting place: Palace of Saint Benedict
- Term: 10 March 2005 – 14 October 2009
- Election: 20 February 2005
- Government: XVII Constitutional Government
- Website: parlamento.pt

Deputies
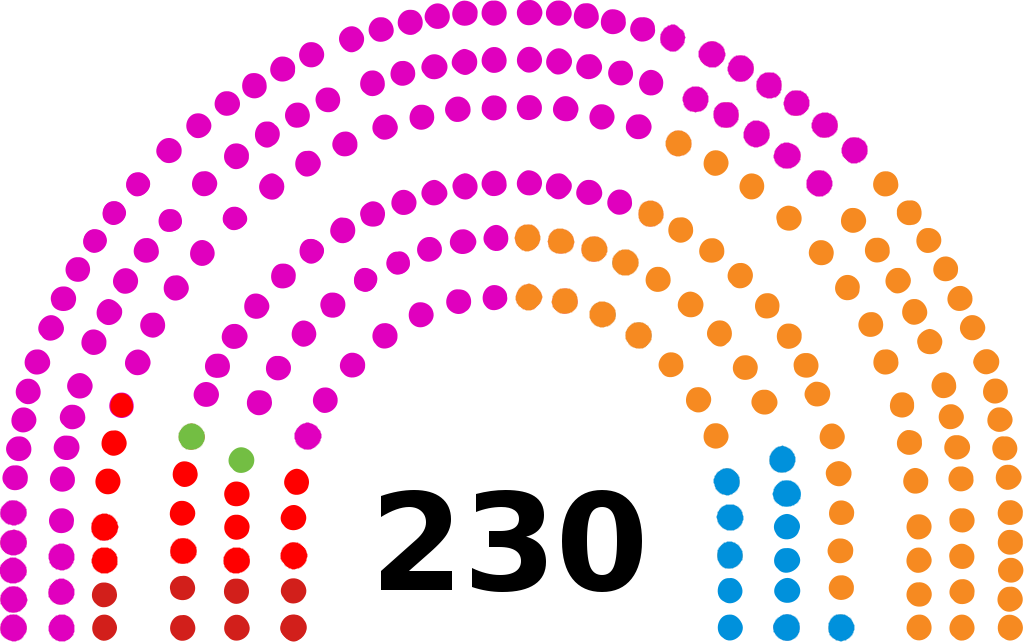
- Members: 230
- President: Jaime Gama (PS)
- First Vice-President: Manuel Alegre (PS)
- Second Vice-President: Guilherme Silva (PPD/PSD)
- Third Vice-President: António Filipe (PCP)
- Fourth Vice-President: Telmo Correia (CDS–PP) (2005–2007); Nuno Melo (CDS–PP) (2007–2009); Teresa Caeiro (CDS–PP) (2009)

The 10th Legislature of the Third Portuguese Republic (Portuguese: X Legislatura da Terceira República Portuguesa) ran from 10 March 2005 to 14 October 2009. The composition of the Assembly of the Republic, the legislative body of Portugal, was determined by the results of the 2005 legislative election, held on 20 February 2005. The 10th legislature was the longest in current Portuguese democracy, lasting 4 years and 218 days.

== Election ==
The 11th Portuguese legislative election was held on 20 February 2005. In the election, the Socialist Party (PS) won its first absolute majority.

Party	Assembly of the Republic			
Party	Votes	%	Seats	+/−
PS	2,588,312	45.03	121	+25
PPD/PSD	1,653,425	28.77	75	–30
CDU	433,369	7.54	14	+2
CDS–PP	416,415	7.25	12	–2
BE	364,971	6.35	8	+5
Other/blank/invalid	291,179	5.07	0	±0
Total	5,747,834	100.00	230	±0

== Composition (2005–2009) ==
Party	Parliamentary group leader	Elected		Dissolution	
Party	Parliamentary group leader	Seats	%	Seats	%
PS	Alberto Martins (Porto)	121	52.6	121	52.6
PPD/PSD	Luís Marques Guedes (Porto) (2005–2007); Pedro Santana Lopes (Lisbon) (2007–2008); Paulo Rangel (Porto) (2008–2009); António Montalvão Machado (Porto) (2009)	75	32.6	75	32.6
PCP	Bernardino Soares (Lisbon)	12	5.2	11	4.8
CDS–PP	Nuno Melo (Braga) (2005–2007); Telmo Correia (2007); Diogo Feio (Porto) (2007–2009)	12	5.2	11	4.8
BE	Luís Fazenda (Lisbon)	8	3.5	8	3.5
PEV	Heloísa Apolónia (Setúbal)	2	0.9	2	0.9
Independent	Luísa Mesquita (Santarém); José Paulo de Carvalho (Porto)	0	0.0	2	0.9
Total		230	100.0	230	100.0

=== Changes ===
- Luísa Mesquita, Portuguese Communist Party (PCP) → Independent: Expelled from the PCP after the party's central committee removed their confidence in her due to a refusal to leave her seat at the request of the party.
- José Paulo Carvalho, CDS – People's Party (CDS–PP) → Independent: Left CDS–PP citing lack of strategy and loss of values and ideas from the party.

== Election for President of the Assembly of the Republic ==
To be elected, a candidate needs to reach a minimum of 116 votes. Jaime Gama, from the Socialist Party, was easily elected:

Election of the President of the Assembly of the Republic
Ballot →	16 March 2005	
Required majority →	116 out of 230	
Jaime Gama (PS)	197 / 230	check
Blank ballots	32 / 230	
Invalid ballots	0 / 230	
Absentees	1 / 230	
