= President of the CDS – People's Party =

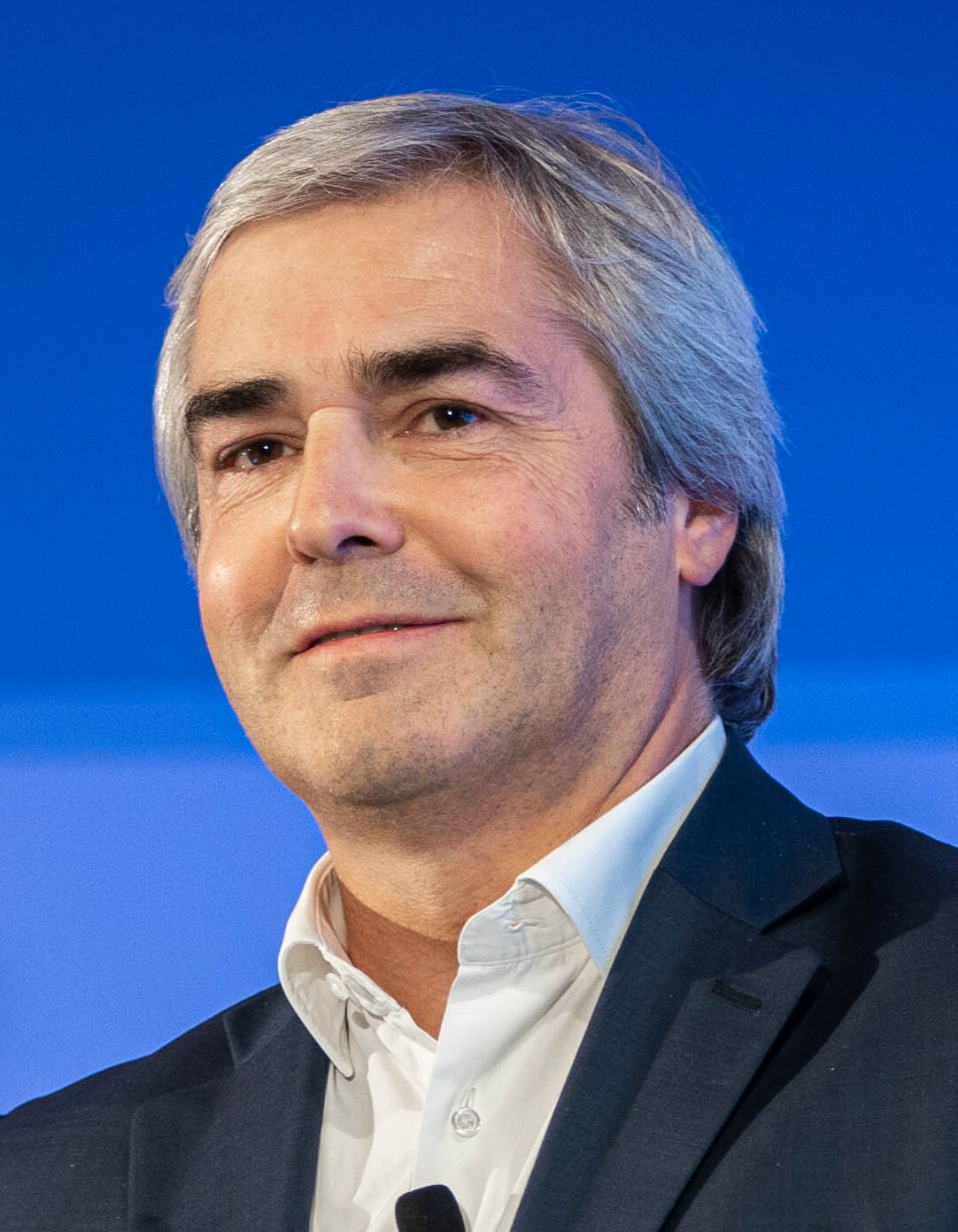
- Incumbent; Nuno Melo since 3 April 2022
- Status: Party leader
- Inaugural holder: Diogo Freitas do Amaral
- Formation: 19 July 1974

The president of the CDS – People's Party is highest position within the Portuguese CDS – People's Party (PSD). The current holder is Nuno Melo, who was elected to the position on 3 April 2022.

== List of presidents of the CDS – People's Party ==
Colour key
(for political parties)
CDS – People's Party (CDS)
Socialist Party (PS)
Social Democratic Party (PSD)
Independent
Interim holder

#	Portrait	Name	Constituency	Term in office		Election	Prime Minister	Ref.
#	Portrait	Name	Constituency	Start	End	Election	Prime Minister	Ref.
1		Diogo Freitas do Amaral (1941–2019)	Lisbon	19 July 1974	20 February 1983	1974	Vasco Gonçalves (1974–1975)	
1		Diogo Freitas do Amaral (1941–2019)	Lisbon	19 July 1974	20 February 1983	1974	José Pinheiro de Azevedo (1975–1976)	
1		Diogo Freitas do Amaral (1941–2019)	Lisbon	19 July 1974	20 February 1983	1976	Mário Soares (1976–1978)	
1		Diogo Freitas do Amaral (1941–2019)	Lisbon	19 July 1974	20 February 1983	1978	Alfredo Nobre da Costa (1978)	
1		Diogo Freitas do Amaral (1941–2019)	Lisbon	19 July 1974	20 February 1983	1978	Carlos Mota Pinto (1978–1979)	
1		Diogo Freitas do Amaral (1941–2019)	Lisbon	19 July 1974	20 February 1983	1978	Maria de Lourdes Pintasilgo (1979–1980)	
1		Diogo Freitas do Amaral (1941–2019)	Lisbon	19 July 1974	20 February 1983	1978	Francisco Sá Carneiro (1980)	
1		Diogo Freitas do Amaral (1941–2019)	Lisbon	19 July 1974	20 February 1983	1978	himself (1980–1981)	
1		Diogo Freitas do Amaral (1941–2019)	Lisbon	19 July 1974	20 February 1983	1981	Francisco Pinto Balsemão (1981–1983)	
2		Francisco Lucas Pires (1944–1998)	Porto (1976–1979); Coimbra (1979–1983); Lisbon (1983–1987)	20 February 1983	13 April 1986	1983	Francisco Pinto Balsemão (1981–1983)	
2		Francisco Lucas Pires (1944–1998)	Porto (1976–1979); Coimbra (1979–1983); Lisbon (1983–1987)	20 February 1983	13 April 1986	1983	Mário Soares (1983–1985)	
2		Francisco Lucas Pires (1944–1998)	Porto (1976–1979); Coimbra (1979–1983); Lisbon (1983–1987)	20 February 1983	13 April 1986	1985	Aníbal Cavaco Silva (1985–1995)	
3		Adriano Moreira (1922–2022)	Bragança (1980–1983); Porto (1983–1987); Lisbon (1987–1995)	13 April 1986	31 January 1988	1986	Aníbal Cavaco Silva (1985–1995)	
4		Diogo Freitas do Amaral (1941–2019)	Lisbon	31 January 1988	22 March 1992	1988	Aníbal Cavaco Silva (1985–1995)	
4		Diogo Freitas do Amaral (1941–2019)	Lisbon	31 January 1988	22 March 1992	1990	Aníbal Cavaco Silva (1985–1995)	
5		Manuel Monteiro (b. 1962)	Porto (1985–1987); Braga (1995–1999)	22 March 1992	22 March 1998	1992	Aníbal Cavaco Silva (1985–1995)	
5		Manuel Monteiro (b. 1962)	Porto (1985–1987); Braga (1995–1999)	22 March 1992	22 March 1998	1994	Aníbal Cavaco Silva (1985–1995)	
5		Manuel Monteiro (b. 1962)	Porto (1985–1987); Braga (1995–1999)	22 March 1992	22 March 1998	1995	Aníbal Cavaco Silva (1985–1995)	
5		Manuel Monteiro (b. 1962)	Porto (1985–1987); Braga (1995–1999)	22 March 1992	22 March 1998	1996	António Guterres (1995–2002)	
6		Paulo Portas (b. 1962)	Aveiro (1995–2015); Lisbon (2015–2016)	22 March 1998	24 April 2005	1998	António Guterres (1995–2002)	
6		Paulo Portas (b. 1962)	Aveiro (1995–2015); Lisbon (2015–2016)	22 March 1998	24 April 2005	2000	António Guterres (1995–2002)	
6		Paulo Portas (b. 1962)	Aveiro (1995–2015); Lisbon (2015–2016)	22 March 1998	24 April 2005	2002	José Durão Barroso (2002–2004)	
6		Paulo Portas (b. 1962)	Aveiro (1995–2015); Lisbon (2015–2016)	22 March 1998	24 April 2005	2003	José Durão Barroso (2002–2004)	
6		Paulo Portas (b. 1962)	Aveiro (1995–2015); Lisbon (2015–2016)	22 March 1998	24 April 2005	2003	Pedro Santana Lopes (2004–2005)	
6		Paulo Portas (b. 1962)	Aveiro (1995–2015); Lisbon (2015–2016)	22 March 1998	24 April 2005	2003	José Sócrates (2005–2011)	
7		José Ribeiro e Castro (b. 1953)	Braga (1976–1979); Aveiro (1979–1980); Lisbon (1980–1983); Braga (1999–2002); Porto (2009–2015); Lisbon (2022)	24 April 2005	21 April 2007	2005	José Sócrates (2005–2011)	
7		José Ribeiro e Castro (b. 1953)	Braga (1976–1979); Aveiro (1979–1980); Lisbon (1980–1983); Braga (1999–2002); Porto (2009–2015); Lisbon (2022)	24 April 2005	21 April 2007	2006	José Sócrates (2005–2011)	
8		Paulo Portas (b. 1962)	Aveiro (1995–2015); Lisbon (2015–2016)	21 April 2007	13 March 2016	2007	José Sócrates (2005–2011)	
8		Paulo Portas (b. 1962)	Aveiro (1995–2015); Lisbon (2015–2016)	21 April 2007	13 March 2016	2008	José Sócrates (2005–2011)	
8		Paulo Portas (b. 1962)	Aveiro (1995–2015); Lisbon (2015–2016)	21 April 2007	13 March 2016	2010	José Sócrates (2005–2011)	
8		Paulo Portas (b. 1962)	Aveiro (1995–2015); Lisbon (2015–2016)	21 April 2007	13 March 2016	2013	Pedro Passos Coelho (2011–2015)	
8		Paulo Portas (b. 1962)	Aveiro (1995–2015); Lisbon (2015–2016)	21 April 2007	13 March 2016	2013	António Costa (2015–2024)	
9		Assunção Cristas (b. 1974)	Leiria (2009–2019); Lisbon (2019–2020)	13 March 2016	25 January 2020	2016	António Costa (2015–2024)	
9		Assunção Cristas (b. 1974)	Leiria (2009–2019); Lisbon (2019–2020)	13 March 2016	25 January 2020	2018	António Costa (2015–2024)	
10		Francisco Rodrigues dos Santos (b. 1988)	Porto (2019–2022); Lisbon (2022)	25 January 2020	3 April 2022	2020	António Costa (2015–2024)	
11		Nuno Melo (b. 1966)	Braga (1999–2009); Porto (since 2024)	3 April 2022	Incumbent	2022	António Costa (2015–2024)	
11		Nuno Melo (b. 1966)	Braga (1999–2009); Porto (since 2024)	3 April 2022	Incumbent	2024	Luís Montenegro (since 2024)	
11		Nuno Melo (b. 1966)	Braga (1999–2009); Porto (since 2024)	3 April 2022	Incumbent	2026	Luís Montenegro (since 2024)	

=== By time in office ===
#	Name	Time in office	Duration
1	Paulo Portas	1998–2005; 2007–2016	15 years, 360 days
2	Diogo Freitas do Amaral	1974–1983; 1988–1992	12 years, 267 days
3	Manuel Monteiro	1992–1998	6 years, 0 days
4	Nuno Melo	2022–present	4 years, 157 days (Incumbent)
5	Assunção Cristas	2016–2020	3 years, 318 days
6	Francisco Lucas Pires	1983–1986	3 years, 52 days
7	Francisco Rodrigues dos Santos	2020–2022	2 years, 68 days
8	José Ribeiro e Castro	2005–2007	1 year, 362 days
9	Adriano Moreira	1986–1988	1 year, 293 days
