= 2007 CDS – People's Party leadership election =

- CDS – People's Party
- 21 April 2007
- Turnout: 17.2%
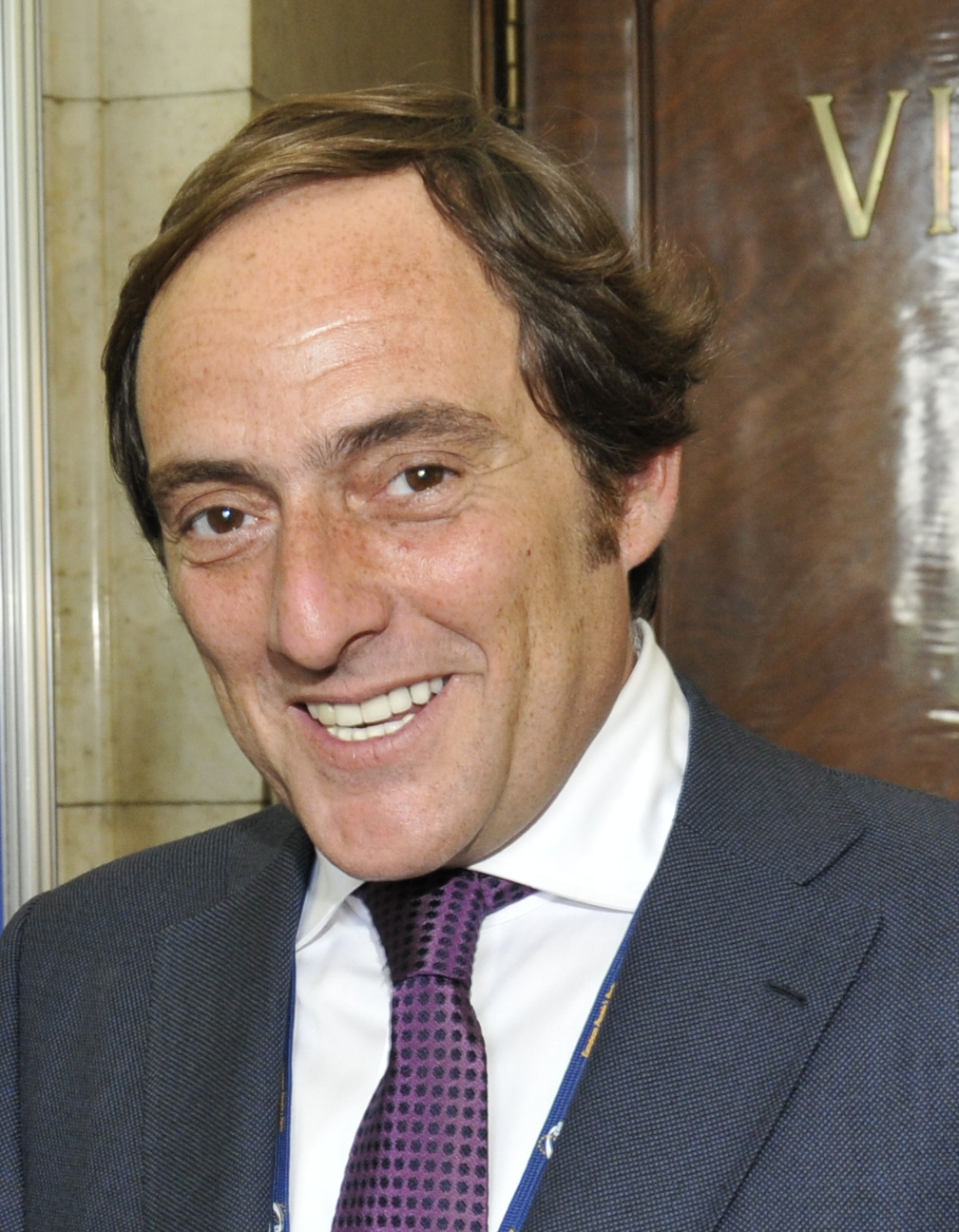

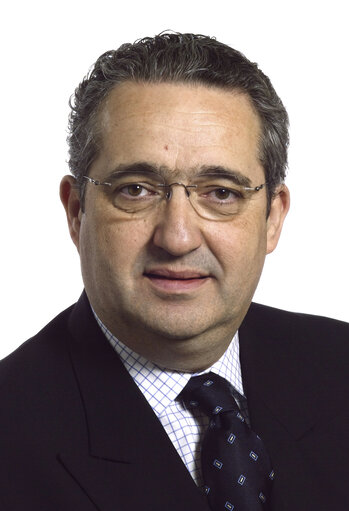
Candidate	Paulo Portas	José Ribeiro e Castro
Popular vote	5,642	1,883
Percentage	74.6%	24.9%
Leader before election
José Ribeiro e Castro
Elected Leader
Paulo Portas

The 2007 CDS – People's Party leadership election was held on 21 April 2007. The incumbent leader since 2005, José Ribeiro e Castro, faced former leader and his predecessor Paulo Portas, who requested a leadership election looking to return to the party's leadership just 2 years after his resignation following the 2005 legislative election.

Paulo Portas won the election by a landslide, returning to his former post as leader of the CDS – People's Party and later contesting the 2009 legislative election.

== Candidates ==
Name	Born	Experience	Announcement date
José Ribeiro e Castro	24 December 1953 (age 53); Lisbon	President of the CDS – People's Party (2005–2007); Member of the European Parliament (1999–2009); Member of Parliament for Braga (1976–1979); (1999); Member of Parliament for Lisbon (1980–1983); Member of Parliament for Aveiro (1979–1980)	1 March 2007
Paulo Portas	12 July 1962 (age 44); Lisbon	Member of Parliament for Aveiro (1995–2015); President of the CDS – People's Party (1998–2005); Minister of National Defence (2002–2005); Member of the European Parliament (1999)	1 March 2007

== Results ==
Summary of the April 2007 CDS–PP leadership election results
Candidate	21 April 2007	
Candidate	Votes	%
Paulo Portas	5,642	74.60
José Ribeiro e Castro	1,883	24.90
Total	7,525	
Valid votes	7,525	99.50
Invalid and blank ballots	38	0.50
Votes cast / turnout	7,563	17.19
Registered voters	44,000	
Sources: RTP, RTP

Vote share
Paulo Portas	74.60%
José Ribeiro e Castro	24.90%
Blank/Invalid	0.50%

== See also ==
- CDS – People's Party
- List of political parties in Portugal
- Elections in Portugal
