= Nuno Melo (politician) =

Portuguese politician (born 1966)

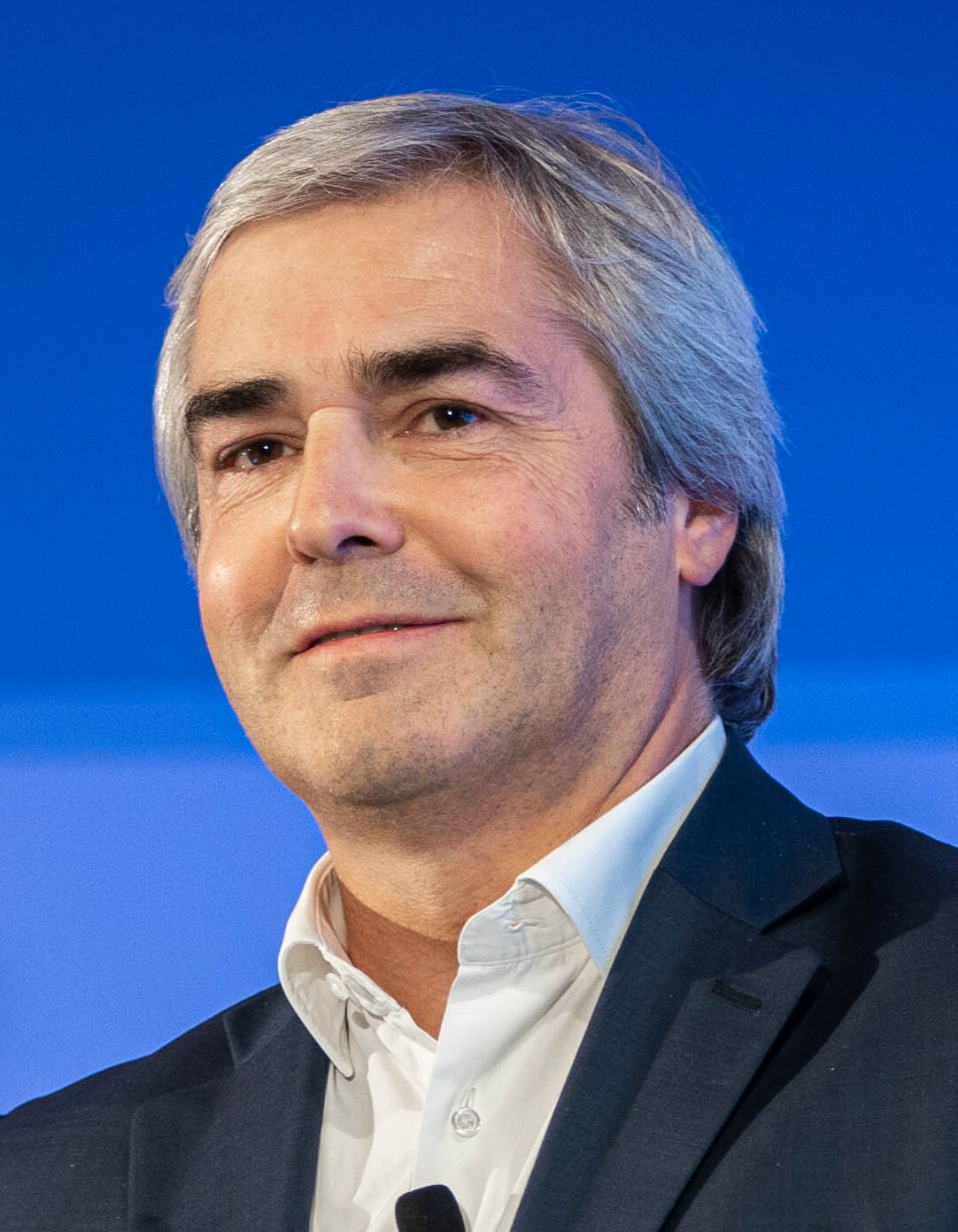
- Melo in 2022

Minister of National Defence
- Incumbent
- Assumed office 2 April 2024
- Prime Minister: Luís Montenegro
- Preceded by: Helena Carreiras

President of the CDS – People's Party
- Incumbent
- Assumed office 3 April 2022
- Preceded by: Francisco Rodrigues dos Santos

Member of the Assembly of the Republic
- In office 26 March 2024 – 2 April 2024
- Constituency: Porto
- In office 27 October 1999 – 7 June 2009
- Constituency: Braga

Member of the European Parliament for Portugal
- In office 14 July 2009 – 25 March 2024
- Succeeded by: Vasco Becker-Weinberg

Personal details
- Born: João Nuno de Lacerda Teixeira de Melo; 18 March 1966 (age 60) Joane, Vila Nova de Famalicão, Portugal
- Party: CDS – People's Party (1987–present)
- Spouse: Ana Melo
- Children: 2
- Education: Universidade Portucalense Infante D. Henrique
- Occupation: Lawyer • politician

João Nuno de Lacerda Teixeira de Melo (born 18 March 1966) is a Portuguese lawyer, conservative politician, current leader of CDS – People's Party (CDS–PP), who is serving as Minister of National Defence, also being a member of the Assembly of the Republic, elected by Porto constituency. He was Member of the European Parliament (MEP) between 2009 and 2024.

== Biography ==
Nuno Melo was born in 1966, in Vila Nova de Famalicão. He is the cousin of Eurico de Melo, one of the main figures of the Social Democratic Party.

=== Member of the Portuguese Parliament, 1999–2009; 2024 ===
Melo was a member of the Assembly of the Republic for the 8th, 9th and 10th legislative terms, and in 2004 chaired the 13th parliamentary enquiry into the 1980 Camarate air crash in which the Portuguese Prime Minister, Francisco Sá Carneiro, and the Minister of Defence died.

In 2007, Nuno Melo was elected as Vice President of the Assembly of the Republic to replace Telmo Correia, who became Caucus leader.

=== Member of the European Parliament, 2009–2024 ===
Melo has been a Member of the European Parliament since the 2009 elections. He first served on the Committee on Civil Liberties, Justice and Home Affairs before moving to the Committee on Agriculture and Rural Development in 2014. In addition, he has been a member of the parliament's delegations to the Euro-Latin American Parliamentary Assembly and to the Mercosur. During the parliamentary term from 2009 to 2014, Melo ranked second for the number of parliamentary questions asked to the European Commission (1,434).

Ahead of the 2014 European elections, the PSD named Melo second on their list, after Paulo Rangel. From 2016 until 2017, he was part of the Parliament's Committee of Inquiry into Money Laundering, Tax Avoidance and Tax Evasion (PANA) that investigated the Panama Papers revelations and tax avoidance schemes more broadly.

=== President of the CDS-PP, 2022–present ===
After a poor showing in the 2021 local elections, Melo decided to advance with a candidacy for the CDS party's leadership against the incumbent president Francisco Rodrigues dos Santos.

Although, after the Assembly of the Republic was dissolved due to the inability of the Socialist Government to pass a budget, which meant there were going to be elections soon, Rodrigues dos Santos canceled the 29th Congress in a generally controversial move, which led to many prominent figures leaving the party.

After a defeat in the 2022 legislative election, where for the first time in its history CDS got no seats in parliament, Rodrigues dos Santos resigned as leader and the new congress was set to April. Backed by big figures associated with the party, such as former president Paulo Portas, Melo won the party's leadership with 73% of the votes, becoming the 11th president of the CDS-PP.

In the preparation to the 2024 legislative election, Nuno Melo joined Luís Montenegro from the PSD and Gonçalo da Câmara Pereira from the PPM in the Democratic Alliance coalition. The coalition won the election and CDS-PP returned to the Assembly of the Republic with 2 deputies. Shortly after, Nuno Melo was appointed as Minister of National Defence in the XXIV Constitutional Government, led by Luís Montenegro.

== Electoral history ==
=== European Parliament election, 2009 ===
Ballot: 7 June 2009
Party	Candidate	Votes	%	Seats	+/−
PSD	Paulo Rangel	1,131,744	31.7	8	+1
PS	Vital Moreira	946,818	26.5	7	–5
BE	Miguel Portas	382,667	10.7	3	+2
CDU	Ilda Figueiredo	379,787	10.6	2	±0
CDS–PP	Nuno Melo	298,423	8.4	2	±0
MEP	Laurinda Alves	55,072	1.5	0	new
PCTP/MRPP	Orlando Alves	42,940	1.2	0	±0
Other parties		95,744	2.7	0	±0
Blank/Invalid ballots		235,748	6.6	–	–
Turnout		3,568,943	36.78	22	–2
Source: Comissão Nacional de Eleições

=== European Parliament election, 2019 ===
Ballot: 26 May 2019
Party	Candidate	Votes	%	Seats	+/−
PS	Pedro Marques	1,104,694	33.4	9	+1
PSD	Paulo Rangel	725,399	21.9	6	±0
BE	Marisa Matias	325,093	9.8	2	+1
CDU	João Ferreira	228,045	6.9	2	–1
CDS–PP	Nuno Melo	204,792	6.2	1	±0
PAN	Francisco Guerreiro	168,015	5.1	1	+1
Alliance	Paulo Sande	61,652	1.9	0	new
Livre	Rui Tavares	60,446	1.8	0	±0
Basta!	André Ventura	49,388	1.5	0	new
NC	Paulo de Morais	34,634	1.1	0	new
Other parties		116,743	2.7	0	±0
Blank/Invalid ballots		235,748	3.5	–	–
Turnout		3,307,644	30.75	21	±0
Source: Comissão Nacional de Eleições

=== CDS–PP leadership election, 2022 ===
Ballot: 2 April 2022
Candidate	Votes	%
Nuno Melo	854	77.5
Miguel Mattos Chaves	104	9.4
Others	144	13.1
Turnout	1,102	
Source: Observador

== Notes ==
Party political offices
Preceded by Francisco Rodrigues dos Santos	President of CDS – People's Party; 2022–present	Incumbent
Political offices
Preceded by Helena Carreiras	Minister of National Defence; 2024–present	Incumbent
