= Francisco Rodrigues dos Santos =

Portuguese politician (born 1988)

- Rodrigues dos Santos in 2022

President of the CDS – People's Party
- In office 26 January 2020 – 3 April 2022
- Preceded by: Assunção Cristas
- Succeeded by: Nuno Melo

President of the People's Youth
- In office 13 December 2015 – 26 January 2020
- Preceded by: Miguel Pires da Silva
- Succeeded by: Francisco Mota

Personal details
- Born: 29 September 1988 (age 38) Coimbra, Portugal
- Party: Independent (2026–present)
- Other political affiliations: CDS – People's Party (2011–2026)
- Education: University of Lisbon

Francisco José Nina Martins Rodrigues dos Santos (born 29 September 1988) is a Portuguese conservative politician and a lawyer. He was elected President of the CDS – People's Party in the National Congress of the Party in Aveiro, with 46% of the votes. In 2018, he was selected as one of the Forbes 30 Under 30 in Europe for law and policy. He left the CDS–PP in November 2026, saying the party had drifted towards the radical right.

== Political career ==
Rodrigues dos Santos is the eldest of three sons from Coimbra, born to an army officer father and lawyer mother. When he was five, the family moved to Vila Nova da Barquinha in the Santarém District due to his father's work. He studied Law in the Faculty of Law at the University of Lisbon, and is a lawyer and consultant at Valadas Coriel & Associates, a law firm based in Lisbon. He started his political career in the People's Youth, which he joined in 2007, before joining the CDS–PP itself in 2011. He became president of the People's Youth in 2015. After five years leading the People's Youth, he decided to stand for the leadership of the CDS – People's Party after poor general election results. During his leadership bid, he presented himself as the "young conservative".

In the 2013 local elections, he led the PSD-CDS-MPT coalition in the Lisbon parish of Carnide, and was elected. Four years later, he was voted onto the city's municipal assembly as the lead candidate of a CDS-MPT-PPM coalition, and resigned in February 2020. In 2021, he was elected onto the same assembly in Oliveira do Hospital in his native Coimbra District.

On his election, he became the youngest leader of a Portuguese parliamentary party. He was, however, unable to assert his authority on the party and his leadership was challenged various times. After his party was unable to elect a single deputy in the 2022 Portuguese legislative election, Francisco Rodrigues dos Santos announced his resignation from CDS-PP's leadership. He was succeeded by MEP Nuno Melo in April 2022.

During the 2022 election campaign, Rodrigues dos Santos made headlines for a video in which he made an allegory between Christmas dinner and the parties of the Portuguese right: Liberal Initiative was a hipster cousin who shares different values from the rest of the family, Chega was a cousin with poor table manners, and PSD was an absent brother, spending the holiday with his left-wing family.

=== Departure from the CDS ===
In a letter to party president Nuno Melo dated 3 November 2026 and made public the following day, Rodrigues dos Santos announced that he was leaving the CDS–PP, a move that Público described as having been foreseeable for some time. He wrote that Portuguese political debate had moved progressively to the right under the influence of identitarian, radicalised and ultraconservative currents, often accompanied by social insensitivity, and that the party had followed that shift, leaving behind the moderate, socially-minded and humanist centre-right he had sought to defend as leader.

Rodrigues dos Santos framed the decision as a search for balance: having earlier promoted the values of the democratic right when he felt Portugal leaned too far to the left, he now felt the need, faced with what he considered an excessive shift to the right, to look more closely at values traditionally associated with the democratic centre-left, and he denied that this was a contradiction. He said he still identified with the humanist tradition of European Christian democracy and with a reformist, socially responsible centre opposed to radicalisation, but doubted the CDS's willingness to occupy that political space. He described his position as centrist, combining economic freedom and private initiative with social justice and solidarity.

He said he was leaving with gratitude and that his regard for those remaining in the party did not depend on their sharing his views. He ended the letter by stating that although he was no longer a member of the CDS, he remained a Christian democrat.

== Personal life ==
Rodrigues dos Santos befriended the son of the prime minister of Portugal António Costa at university. He is a fan of Sporting CP; when the club were on a 19-year title drought, he likened their fortunes to those of his party. He married Inês Guerra Vargas in 2021.

== Electoral history ==
=== CDS–PP leadership election, 2020 ===
Ballot: 26 January 2020
Candidate	Votes	%
Francisco Rodrigues dos Santos	671	46.5
João Almeida	562	39.0
Filipe Lobo d'Ávila	209	14.5
Blank/Invalid ballots	7	–
Turnout	1,449	
Source: CDS Congress

=== Legislative election, 2022 ===
Ballot: 30 January 2022
Party	Candidate	Votes	%	Seats	+/−
PS	António Costa	2,302,601	41.4	120	+12
PSD	Rui Rio	1,618,381	29.1	77	–2
Chega	André Ventura	399,659	7.2	12	+11
IL	João Cotrim Figueiredo	273,687	4.9	8	+7
BE	Catarina Martins	244,603	4.4	5	–14
CDU	Jerónimo de Sousa	238,920	4.3	6	–6
CDS–PP	Francisco Rodrigues dos Santos	89,181	1.6	0	–5
PAN	Inês Sousa Real	88,152	1.6	1	–3
Livre	Rui Tavares	71,232	1.3	1	±0
Other parties		91,299	1.6	0	±0
Blank/Invalid ballots		146,824	2.6	–	–
Turnout		5,564,539	51.46	230	±0
Source: Comissão Nacional de Eleições
