= People's Youth (Portugal) =

Portuguese political youth organisation

People's Youth Juventude Popular
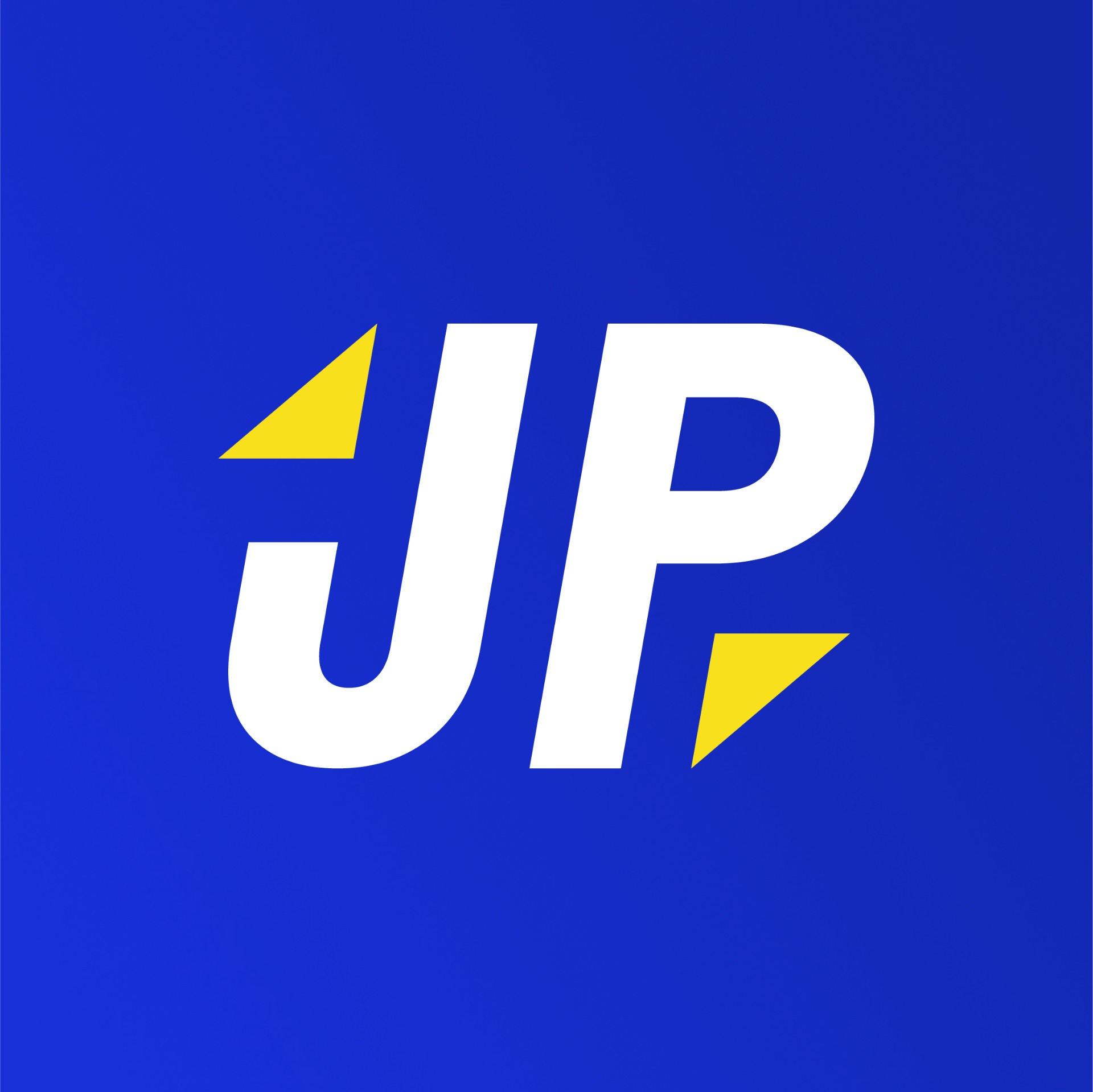

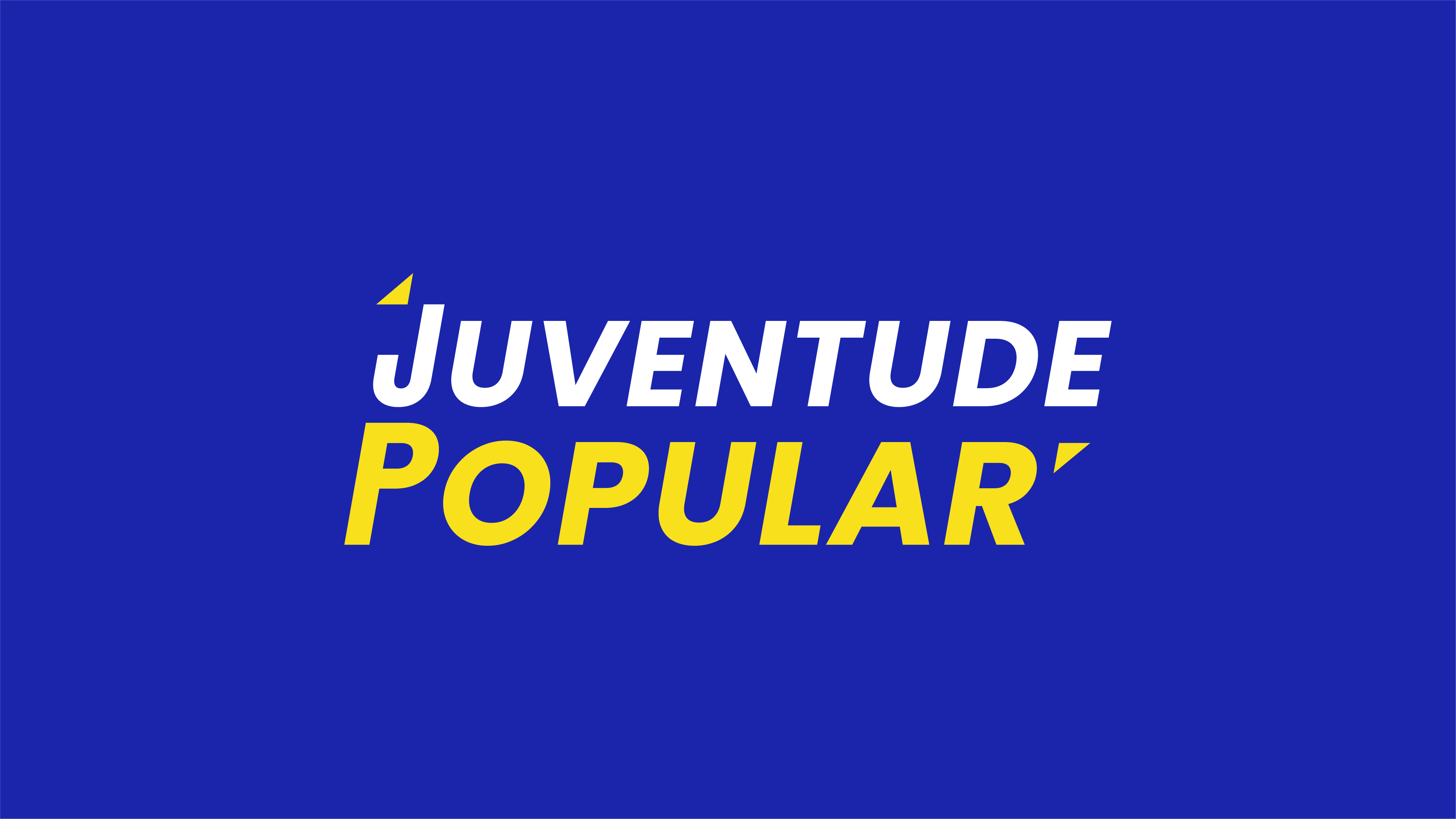
- President: Catarina Marinho
- Secretary General: João Miguel Pais
- Founded: November 4, 1974
- Headquarters: 5 Largo Adelino Amaro da Costa; 1149-063 Lisbon
- Ideology: Christian democracy Conservatism; Social conservatism National conservatism Classical liberalism
- Mother party: Democratic and Social Centre – People's Party
- International affiliation: International Young Democrat Union
- European affiliation: Democrat Youth Community of Europe; Youth of the European People's Party
- Website: www.juventudepopular.org

The People's Youth (Portuguese: Juventude Popular) is a Portuguese political youth organisation. It is an autonomous organisation affiliated to the Democratic and Social Centre – People's Party (CDS–PP).

It is a member of the Youth of the European People's Party, the Democrat Youth Community of Europe and the International Young Democrat Union.

Francisco Rodrigues dos Santos was elected President of Juventude Popular on 13 December 2015, in Peniche. During the present CDS-PP's leader mandate as President of Juventude Popular, the organisation climbed to over 22 000 members and duplicated its local political representation in the portuguese local elections in 2017. In 2018, he was nominated for the prestigious Forbes "30 under 30" list for law and politics.

In January 2020, Rodrigues dos Santos was elected leader of CDS-PP and Francisco Peres Filipe Mota, vice president of the youth organisation, occupied the leadership position of Juventude Popular until the March 2021 National Congress. Francisco Camacho, former chairman of the Lisbon Section of the People’s Youth was elected president.

== Gonçalo Begonha Policy Institute ==
The Gonçalo Begonha Studies Office (Gabinete de Estudos Gonçalo Begonha) is policy institute responsible for political and ideological formation within the People's Youth. It was named after Gonçalo Botelho Gomes Begonha (born 14 September 1980), who was an important member of the People's Youth and a member of its board for several times. Additionally, Gonçalo Begonha was an important municipal leader of the People's Youth until his premature death in the summer of 2003. Due to Begonha's love for books and culture, his name was given to the Studies Offices of the People's Youth.

According to the statutes of the People's Youth, the GEGB is the organization responsible not only with the political and ideological formation of its members, but also with supporting the Youth with the technical support needed for its proposals and projects. Its functions include the following:

- Develop the needed research to promote and sustain the political intervention of the People's Youth;
- Promote debate inside and outside the organisation on matters of political relevance;
- Elaborate documentation regarding the policies proposed and defended by the People's Youth;
- Develop new projects for the People's Youth.

The Universities of the People's Youth (Escola de Quadros), are also prepared and organized by the GEGB.

== List of Presidents ==
- Caetano da Cunha Reis: 1975 – 1976
- Eduardo Urze Pires: 1976 – 1977
- Alexandre Sousa Machado: 1977 – 1979
- Francisco Cavaleiro Ferreira: 1979 – 1981
- Jorge Goes: 1981 – 1986
- Manuel Monteiro: 1986 – 1990
- Martim Borges de Freitas: 1990 – 1994
- Nuno Correia da Silva: 1994 – 1996
- Pedro Mota Soares: 1996 – 1999
- João Almeida: 1999 – 2007
- Pedro Moutinho: 2007 – 2009
- Michael Seufert: 2009 – 2011
- Miguel Pires da Silva: 2011 – 2015
- Francisco Rodrigues dos Santos: 2015 – 2020
- Francisco Mota (interim): 2020 – 2021
- Francisco Camacho: 2021 – 2025
- Catarina Marinho: 2025 – present
