= Telmo Correia =

Portuguese politician

Secretary of State for Internal Administration
- Incumbent
- Assumed office 2 April 2024
- Prime Minister: Luís Montenegro
- Preceded by: Isabel Oneto

Vice President of the Assembly of the Republic
- In office 10 March 2005 – 10 May 2007
- President: Jaime Gama

Minister of Tourism
- In office 17 July 2004 – 12 March 2005
- Prime Minister: Pedro Santana Lopes

Member of the Assembly of the Republic
- In office 15 October 2009 – 28 March 2022
- Constituency: Braga
- In office 25 October 1999 – 15 October 2009
- Constituency: Lisbon

Personal details
- Born: Telmo Augusto Gomes de Noronha Correia; 4 February 1960 (age 66) Lisbon, Portugal
- Party: CDS – People's Party
- Occupation: Politician

Telmo Augusto Gomes de Noronha Correia (born 4 February 1960) is a Portuguese politician, who has been the Secretary of State for Internal Administration since 2024. He was also Minister of Tourism from 2004 until 2005 and was a member of the Assembly of the Republic from 1999 until 2022, during which time he served as Vice President of the Assembly of the Republic from 2005 until 2007 and as President of the parliamentary group of the CDS – People's Party.
