= José Ribeiro e Castro =

Portuguese lawyer and politician

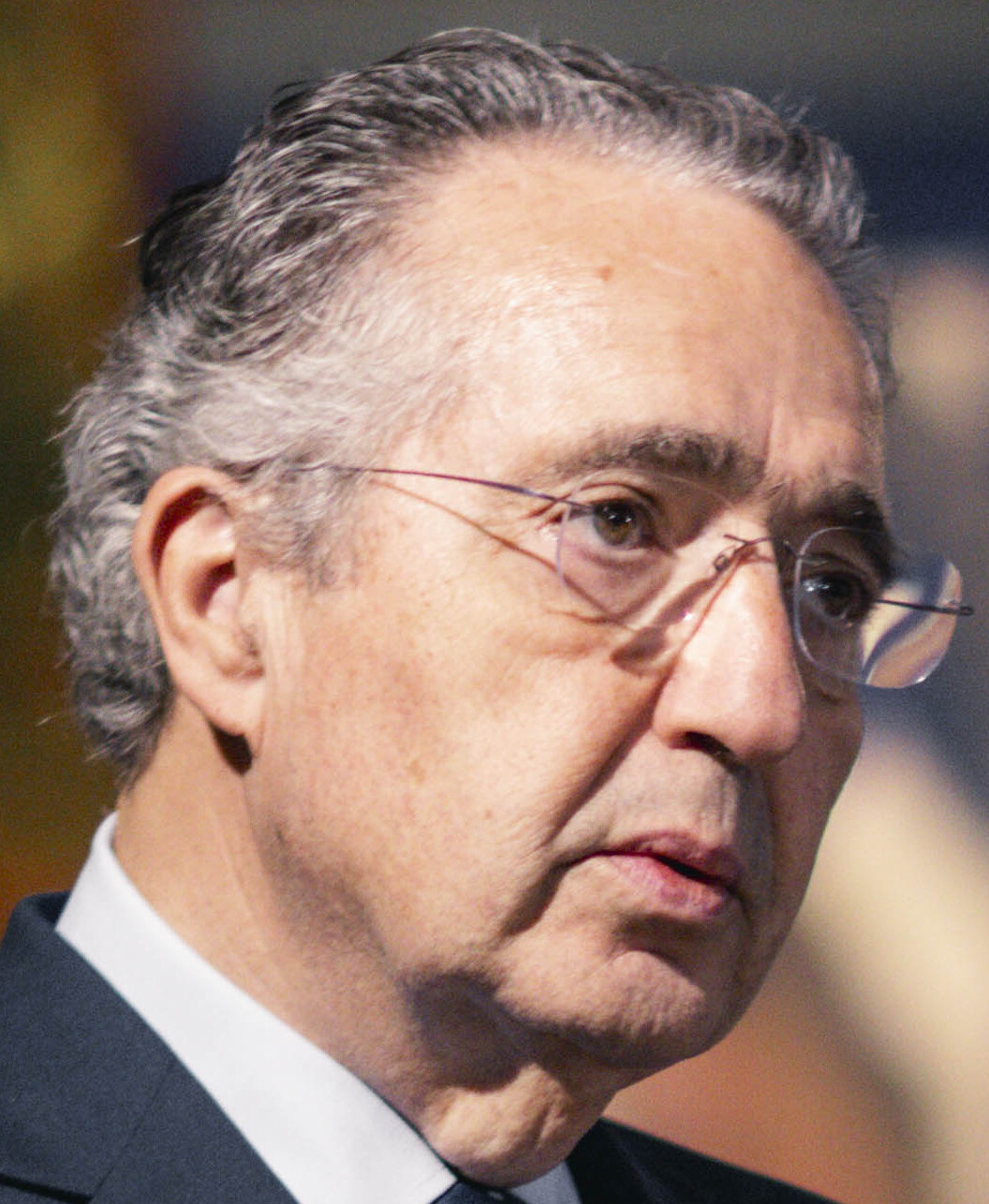
José Ribeiro e Castro in 2025

José Duarte de Almeida Ribeiro e Castro (born Lisbon, 24 December 1953) is a Portuguese lawyer and politician. He was the leader of the People's Party from 24 April 2005 to 2007, when he was replaced again by Paulo Portas. He was also a Member of the European Parliament (MEP) from 1999 to 2009, for the Social Democratic Party–People's Party coalition; part of the European People's Party–European Democrats group.

== Education ==
He is a Graduate in law (Lisbon, 1975).

== Politician ==
He was a member of Odemira Municipal Assembly (1982-1985).

- EPP/ED group coordinator at the Human Rights Subcommittee in the European Parliament (since 2004).
- Member and Chairman of Sintra Municipal Assembly (since 2002).
- Legal adviser to the Ministry of Labour and Social Security (since 1991).
- Member of the Higher Council for Social Policy of the Ministry of Social Affairs (1988–1990).
- Member of the Portuguese Parliament (1976–1983 and 1999).
- Adviser and assistant to the Ministry of Education (1987–1991).
- Secretary of State in the Deputy Prime Minister's Office (1980 and 1981–1983).

=== CDS ===
He is a member of the National Board of the CDS party (1975–1983) and the CDS-PP (1998-2003). He was formerly a member of the CDS-PP’s National Board Executive Committee, vice-chair of the CDS’ parliamentary group for 1981 and CDS spokesperson from 1976–1983.

== Career ==
He founded Juventude Centrista in 1974, and worked as a legal expert and counsellor (1976–1999). He then worked in television as a member (1988–1990), and chair (1990–1991), of the inspection board of RTP (Portuguese Radio and Television). Between 1991 and 1999, he held a number of managerial posts at TVI television.

He was vice-chairman of Sport Lisboa e Benfica for 1997–1998. He is a contributor to various newspapers.

Castro was awarded the Chilean Order of Bernardo O'Higgins and the Order of Merit of Luxembourg in 2010 and the Order of Prince Henry of Portugal in 2017.
