= CDS – People's Party =

Conservative political party in Portugal

CDS – People's Party CDS – Partido Popular
- Abbreviation: CDS–PP
- President: Nuno Melo
- Spokesperson: Isabel Galriça Neto
- Founders: Diogo Freitas do Amaral; Paulo Lowndes Marques; Adelino Amaro da Costa; Basílio Horta; João Morais Leitão
- Founded: 19 July 1974; 52 years ago
- Legalized: 13 January 1975; 51 years ago
- Headquarters: Largo Adelino Amaro da Costa 5, 1149-063 Lisbon
- Youth wing: People's Youth
- Membership (2023): c. 40,000
- Ideology: Christian democracy; Conservatism
- Political position: Centre-right to right-wing
- National affiliation: AD (since 2024); AP/PàF (2014–2015); AD (1979–1983)
- European affiliation: European People's Party
- European Parliament group: European People's Party Group
- International affiliation: International Democracy Union
- Colours: Sky blue
- Anthem: "Para a Voz de Portugal ser Maior" "For Portugal's Voice to Be Greater"
- Assembly of the Republic: 2 / 230
- European Parliament: 1 / 21
- Regional Parliaments: 3 / 104
- Local government (Mayors): 7 / 308
- Local government (Parishes): 48 / 3,216

Election symbol
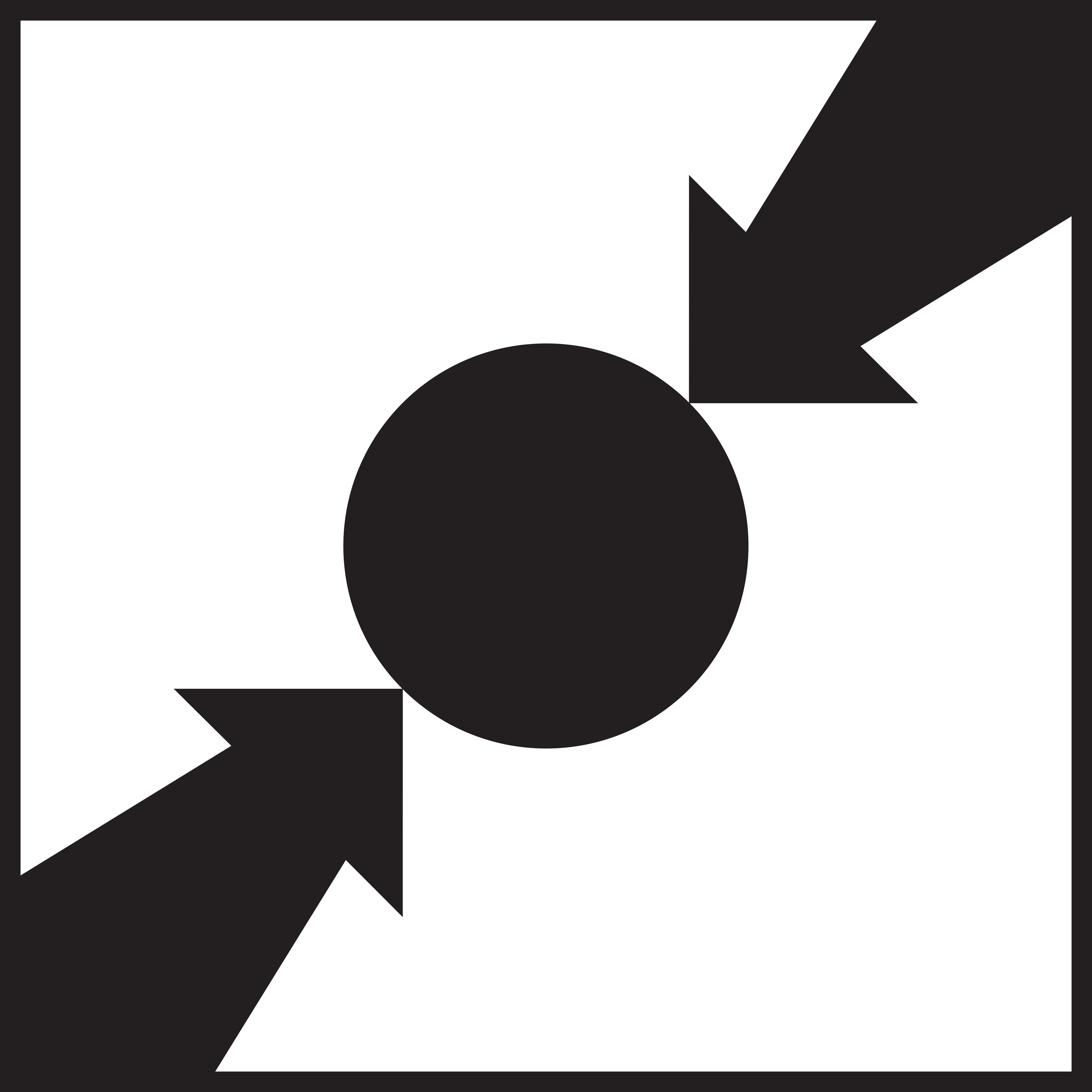

Party flag

Website
- cds.pt

The CDS – People's Party (Portuguese: CDS – Partido Popular, derived from Centro Democrático e Social – Partido Popular, CDS–PP) is a conservative and Christian democratic political party in Portugal. It is characterized as being between the centre-right and right-wing of the political spectrum. In voting ballots, the party's name appears only as the People's Party, with the abbreviation CDS–PP unchanged.

The party was founded on 19 July 1974 during the Carnation Revolution. In its first democratic elections in 1975, the CDS-PP won 16 seats out of 250 – increasing to 42 in the 1976 legislative election. The party entered a short-lived coalition with the Socialist Party (PS) before joining the Democratic Alliance (AD). The party has been involved in centre-right coalitions with the Social Democratic Party (PSD) from 1980 to 1983 and again from 2002 to 2005. In the 2009 legislative election, the party won 21 seats, its most since the 1985 election, and increased it to 24 in 2011, leading to it forming a coalition government with the PSD.

The party is a member of the European People's Party (EPP) and the International Democracy Union (IDU). The party also has autonomous organisations which share its political beliefs, the People's Youth and the Federation of Christian Democratic Workers.

After a disastrous result in the 2022 general elections, which left the party with no seats in the Assembly of the Republic for the first time ever since its founding, Francisco Rodrigues dos Santos resigned as president; he was replaced by MEP Nuno Melo in the 29th National Congress of the Party. Running within a revived Democratic Alliance coalition with the PSD, the party returned to government after the 2024 election, with Melo becoming Minister of National Defence; the coalition retained power in the 2025 election.

== History ==
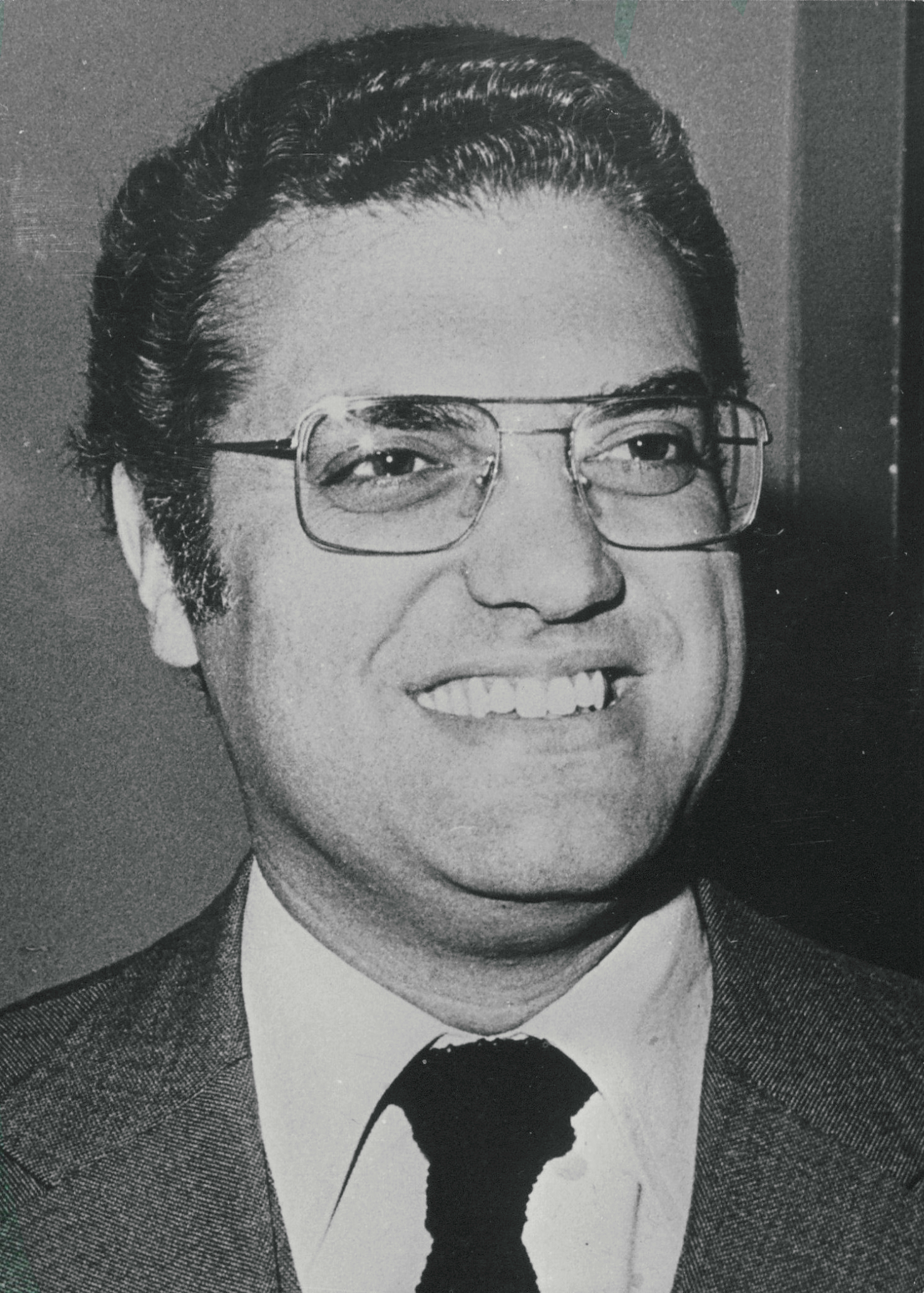
Diogo Freitas do Amaral (1941–2019), CDS founder and party leader between 1974–1983 and 1988–1992

=== Foundation ===
The CDS, Democratic Social Centre, was founded on 19 July 1974 by Diogo Freitas do Amaral, Paulo Lowndes Marques, Adelino Amaro da Costa, Basílio Horta, Vítor Sá Machado, Valentim Xavier Pintado, João Morais Leitão and João Porto. By that time, Portugal was living an unstable political moment: instability, violence and great social tensions were evident after the Carnation Revolution held on 25 April of the same year. The then CDS declared itself as a party rigorously at the centre of the political spectrum, but by then it already counted with a major slice of Portuguese right-winger in its affiliations. On 13 January 1975, the leaders of CDS delivered at the Supreme Court of Justice the necessary documentation to legalise the party. The first congress was held on 25 January 1975, at the Rosa Mota Pavilion, Porto city, which was interrupted by a siege from far-left protesters.

=== First years of opposition ===
After 25 March 1975, a regime centred in social matters, state control of the economy and military leadership began its efforts to dominate the nation, which summed up with the COPCON (a post-revolutionary military organisation founded in 1974) and the constant attacks perpetrated on the western social democrat model, led the CDS to declare itself officially as an opposition party. Its 16 deputies cast the only votes against the Socialist-influenced Constitution of 1976, on 2 April. In the legislative election of 1976, the CDS achieved its objectives by having 42 deputies elected and so surpassing the Portuguese Communist Party (PCP).

=== The Democratic Alliance ===
In 1979, the CDS proposed a coalition with the Social Democratic Party (PSD) and the People's Monarchist Party (PPM). The proposal brought about the creation of the Democratic Alliance (AD), headed by Francisco Sá Carneiro, which won the general elections of 1979 and 1980.

In the AD governments, the CDS was represented by five ministers and ten state secretaries, with the president of the party, Diogo Freitas do Amaral, being nominated to the offices of Deputy Prime Minister and Minister of Foreign Affairs (later nominated Deputy Prime Minister and Defence Minister).

On the night of 4 December 1980, Sá Carneiro and his Minister of National Defence, Adelino Amaro da Costa, were among those who died in a plane crash. Diogo Freitas do Amaral became caretaker prime minister until the formation of a new government, which Francisco Pinto Balsemão headed. This latter administration collapsed on 4 September 1981, after the resignation of Freitas do Amaral (both from the cabinet and from the party presidency). As a result, the Democratic Alliance ended.

=== An opposition of 20 years ===
After the collapse of the AD, the party looked for a new leader and new direction. Freitas do Amaral's successors were Francisco Lucas Pires (1983–1986) and Adriano Moreira (1986–1988), who, having been unable to stop the party's negative performance, did not stand for re-election. Freitas do Amaral returned as party president, during a period characterised by the electoral success of the PSD, with the leadership of Aníbal Cavaco Silva, to lead a rump of four deputies (later five) in parliament.

In 1992, a new generation took over the party. At the party's 10th Congress in March of that year, the former president of the Centrist Youth (the then-youth organisation of the CDS), Manuel Monteiro, was elected to the presidency. A year later, at an extraordinary congress, the title People's Party ("Partido Popular") was added to the party's official name in an effort to emulate the Spanish party of the same name. Freitas do Amaral left the party in the same year.

In 1993, the CDS-PP was expelled from the European People's Party (EPP), both for rejecting the Maastricht Treaty and therefore being not pro-integrationist enough and for not paying due membership fees.

The CDS-PP underwent an electoral recovery in the general election of 1995, electing 15 deputies. However, following poor electoral results in local elections in 1997, Manuel Monteiro resigned and was replaced at the party's Braga congress by Paulo Portas who defeated Maria José Nogueira Pinto. Portas proposed a return to the party's Christian democratic roots and set himself the challenge of keeping all 15 seats in parliament in the general election of 1999. This was accomplished.

=== The "Democratic Coalition" ===
After a massive electoral defeat in the 2001 local elections, the Socialist Party (PS) Prime Minister António Guterres resigned with a general election being held in early 2002. The PSD won a plurality, forcing them to enter into a coalition, 20 years after their previous coalition government with the CDS-PP. The CDS-PP gained three ministries: Paulo Portas as Minister of National Defence, Bagão Félix as Minister of Social Security and Celeste Cardona as Minister of Justice.

The CDS-PP contested the 2004 European election in a joint electoral list with the PSD called Forward Portugal (FP), retaining its 2 MEPs.

In the summer of 2004, PSD Prime Minister José Manuel Durão Barroso, resigned to become president of the European Commission and in order to avoid an early general election, President Jorge Sampaio invited Pedro Santana Lopes to form a new PSD/CDS-PP coalition government. Due to low popularity and what was seen as the inept handling of the country by the new prime minister, parliament was dissolved after just four months on 30 November 2004 and a new general election was scheduled for February 2005.

=== 2005 general election ===
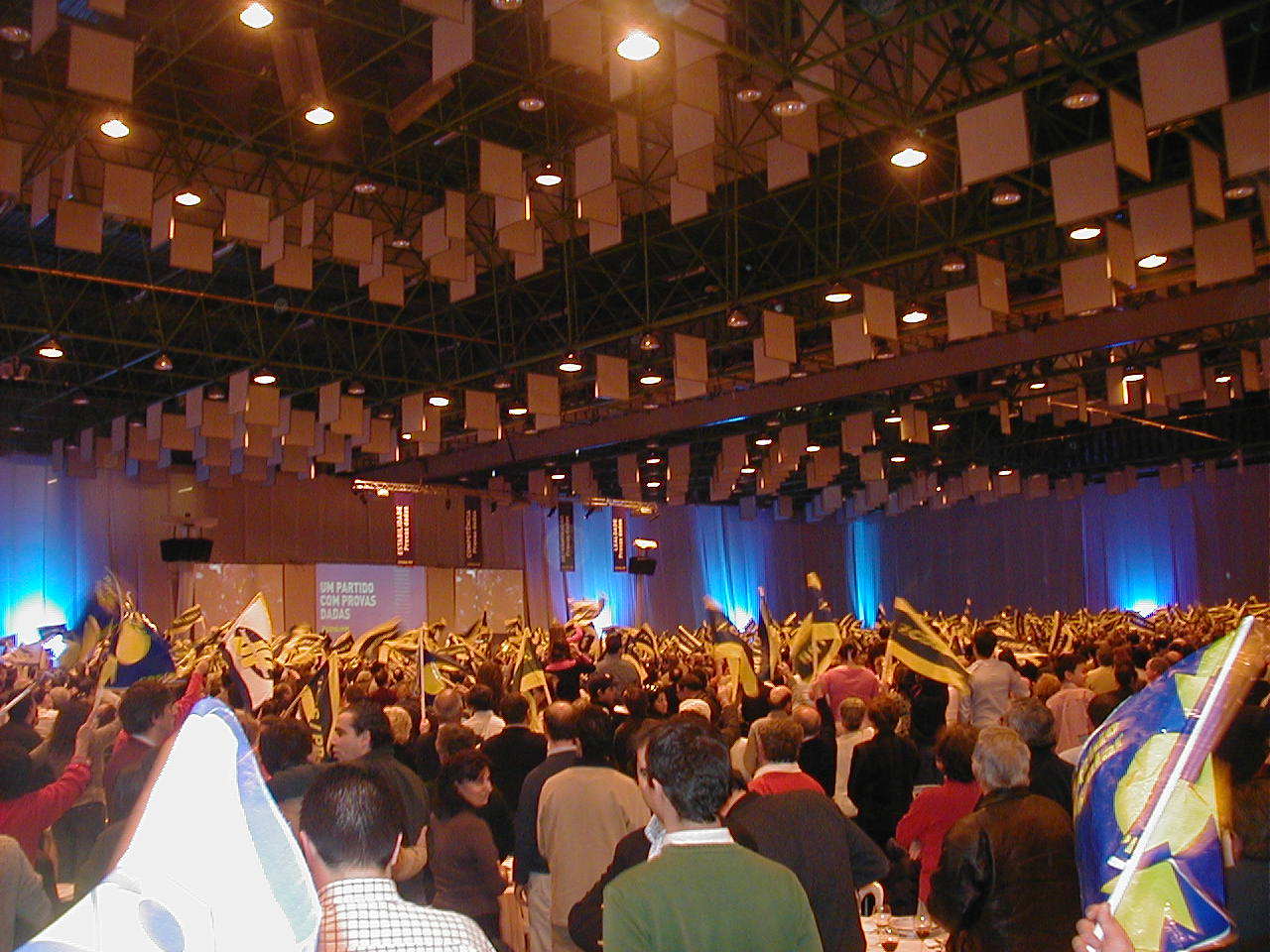
CDS-PP rally in January 2005 in Europarque, Santa Maria da Feira, with more than 5,000 people

In the 2005 legislative election, the CDS-PP obtained 7.2% of the vote and returning 12 deputies, losing two of its 14 deputies. The CDS-PP returned to opposition, with its coalition partner the PSD losing to the centre-left PS, whose leader José Sócrates became prime minister. This electoral failure for the CDS-PP, along with the defeat of the PSD led to Paulo Portas's resignation as party leader and a congress to elect a new leader.

=== "Portugal 2009" ===
After the resignation of Paulo Portas, who had led the CDS-PP for seven years, two candidates then emerged: Telmo Correia and José Ribeiro e Castro, with the former being looked on as a favourite, following the line and style of Paulo Portas. However, José Ribeiro e Castro with his 'Portugal 2009' platform was elected president of the CDS-PP. In May 2007, however, Paulo Portas was again elected as the leader of the party, amidst controversy.

The CDS-PP contested the 2009 European election in a standalone list, retaining its two MEPs with 8.4% of the vote.

In the 2009 legislative election, the party increased their share of the votes to 10.4% and won 21 seats, while remaining in opposition to Prime Minister José Sócrates.

=== Return to government in 2011 ===
In the 2011 legislative election, the CDS-PP increased its share of the vote yet again to 11.7%, returning 24 deputies. This, along with the victory of the PSD over the incumbent PS government, resulted in the CDS-PP joining a coalition government led by PSD leader and Prime Minister Pedro Passos Coelho, obtaining 5 ministries in the cabinet.

=== 2014 European elections ===
The 2014 European election had the CDS-PP once again form a joint list with the PSD, this time called the Portugal Alliance. The list received 27.7% of the vote, second place behind the PS, and returned a single MEP for the CDS-PP.

=== 2015 general election and Portugal à Frente ===
The CDS-PP formed an alliance with the PSD ahead of the 2015 legislative election, called Portugal Ahead (Portugal à Frente, PàF) with PSD leader and Prime Minister Pedro Passos Coelho leading the coalition. The PàF coalition, however, lost 25 seats and the parliamentary majority, though they were still comfortably ahead of the Socialist Party by more than 20 seats. President Aníbal Cavaco Silva swore in Passos Coelho and his minority government, but ten days later the PàF government collapsed when the Communists, Greens and Left Bloc voted in favour of the Socialists' motion of no confidence. Socialist lead António Costa was sworn in as prime minister on 26 November in a minority government, thrusting PàF into opposition. Passos Coelho declared the end of the Portugal Ahead coalition 16 December.

=== 2019 European elections ===
The 2019 European election had the CDS-PP return to an individual list, rather than allying with the PSD. The CDS-PP again returned just a single MEP on 6.2% of the vote.

=== 2019 general election ===
Longtime leader Paulo Portas left the party's leadership after 20 years in December 2015. In March 2016, Assunção Cristas, Portas's chosen successor, was overwhelmingly elected leader of the party over Miguel Mattos Chaves. Cristas became the party's first female leader. However, the subsequent legislative elections were disastrous for the party. The CDS-PP lost 13 of their previous 18 seats, leaving them with only five, and took less than 5% of the vote as António Costa's Socialist government strengthened their position, but fell short of an absolute majority. Cristas resigned as CDS-PP as the election results became clear.

=== 2022 general election ===
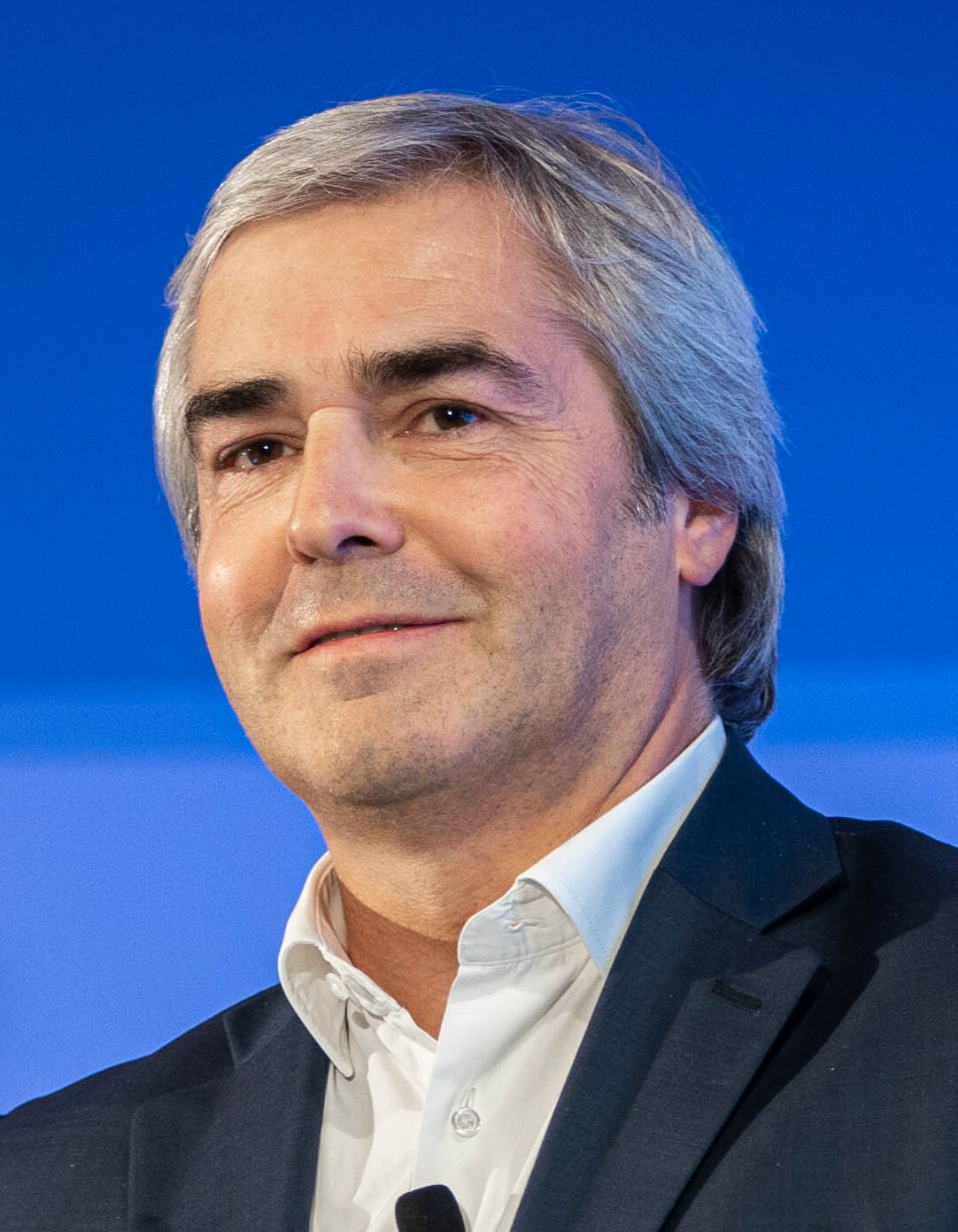
Nuno Melo, party leader since 2022

A snap election was called for January 2022 after Costa's budget was rejected when the Left Bloc and Communists joined the right-wing parties in voting against it. The party was led by Francisco Rodrigues dos Santos, the leader of People's Youth, who narrowly won the 2020 leadership election. The election resulted in a surprise majority for Costa's Socialists after tightening polls, and the CDS-PP lost their five remaining seats on just 1.6% and for the first time since the restoration of democracy returned no members of the Assembly. The party received just 86,578 votes, less than half of their 2019 total. The CDS-PP's disastrous results were blamed partially on the rise of other right-wing parties, Liberal Initiative and Chega!, which both saw huge increases in support. Francisco Rodrigues dos Santos, then the president of the party, resigned on the very same night.

In the following congress, he was replaced by CDS's single MEP, Nuno Melo.

=== 2024 general election and the new Democratic Alliance ===
In November 2023, Prime Minister António Costa tendered his resignation after a series of police raids regarding an investigation around alleged corruption involving the award of contracts for lithium and hydrogen businesses, and, shortly after, a snap election was called for 10 March 2024. CDS–PP decided to contest the election in a joint alliance called Democratic Alliance (AD) alongside PSD and PPM. The AD coalition won by a slight margin over the Socialists, 29 to 28 percent, and formed a minority government. CDS–PP leader, Nuno Melo, became Defence minister. Three months later, in the 2024 European Parliament elections, the AD coalition was narrowly defeated by the Socialists, 31 to 32 percent. A new election was called for May 2025, after a vote of confidence in the AD minority government was rejected, following the revelations of the Spinumviva case. The AD coalition emerged victorious once again, winning a stronger mandate with nearly 32 percent of the votes and 91 seats.

=== 2025 legislative election ===
In the 18 May 2025 legislative election, CDS-PP again ran in coalition with the Aliança Democrática group. The alliance garnered 1,971,558 votes, representing 31.21% of the voting electorate. The results netted 88 of 230 seats to the coalition, making it the most-voted group in the election.

== Ideology ==
A large ideological overlap exists between the CDS-PP and the Social Democratic Party (PSD). The CDS-PP's original philosophy was based on Christian democracy, and it was originally positioned in the centre. A factional disagreement within the party between those that believed that the CDS-PP should be to the right of the PSD or in the political centre erupted. The party shifted in the early 1990s under the leadership of Manuel Monteiro. It still considers itself to be a centrist party. It has been also described as a national conservative party.

The party formerly had a pro-EU line, but switched under Monteiro, becoming mildly Eurosceptic, including opposing the Maastricht Treaty, with this change of policy credited for ending the party's decline. As a result of the change, the European People's Party (EPP) expelled the CDS-PP from the EPP Group in the European parliament, with the CDS-PP joining the Union for Europe (UfE) group instead. Monteiro's successor, Paulo Portas, continued the CDS-PP's Eurosceptic line, but rejoined the EPP.

The CDS-PP has always strongly opposed the legalisation of abortion in Portugal and is officially an anti-abortion party. It had campaigned vigorously against the legalisation of abortion up to ten weeks in the 1998 referendum on abortion and in the 2007 referendum, where under the current law abortions are allowed up to 12 weeks if the mother's life or mental or physical health is at risk, up to 16 weeks in cases of rape and up to 24 weeks if the child may be born with an incurable disease or deformity; whereas the new law proposal will allow abortions on request up to the tenth week. The CDS-PP has proposed what it considers to be responsible alternatives based on the "right to life" to solve the problem of illegal abortion and of abortion itself.

=== Political positions ===
Some of the party's proposals include:

- Stronger immigration laws
- Opposition to European federalism
- Stronger relations with Brazil
- Introducing a school voucher-based education system
- A stronger stance on law and order issues
- A substantial decrease in taxation

==== Until 1991 ====
- Opposition to the MPLA regime of Angola and support for UNITA and RENAMO
- Opposition to hard sanctions on South Africa

== Organisation ==
=== Symbols ===
==== Logos ====
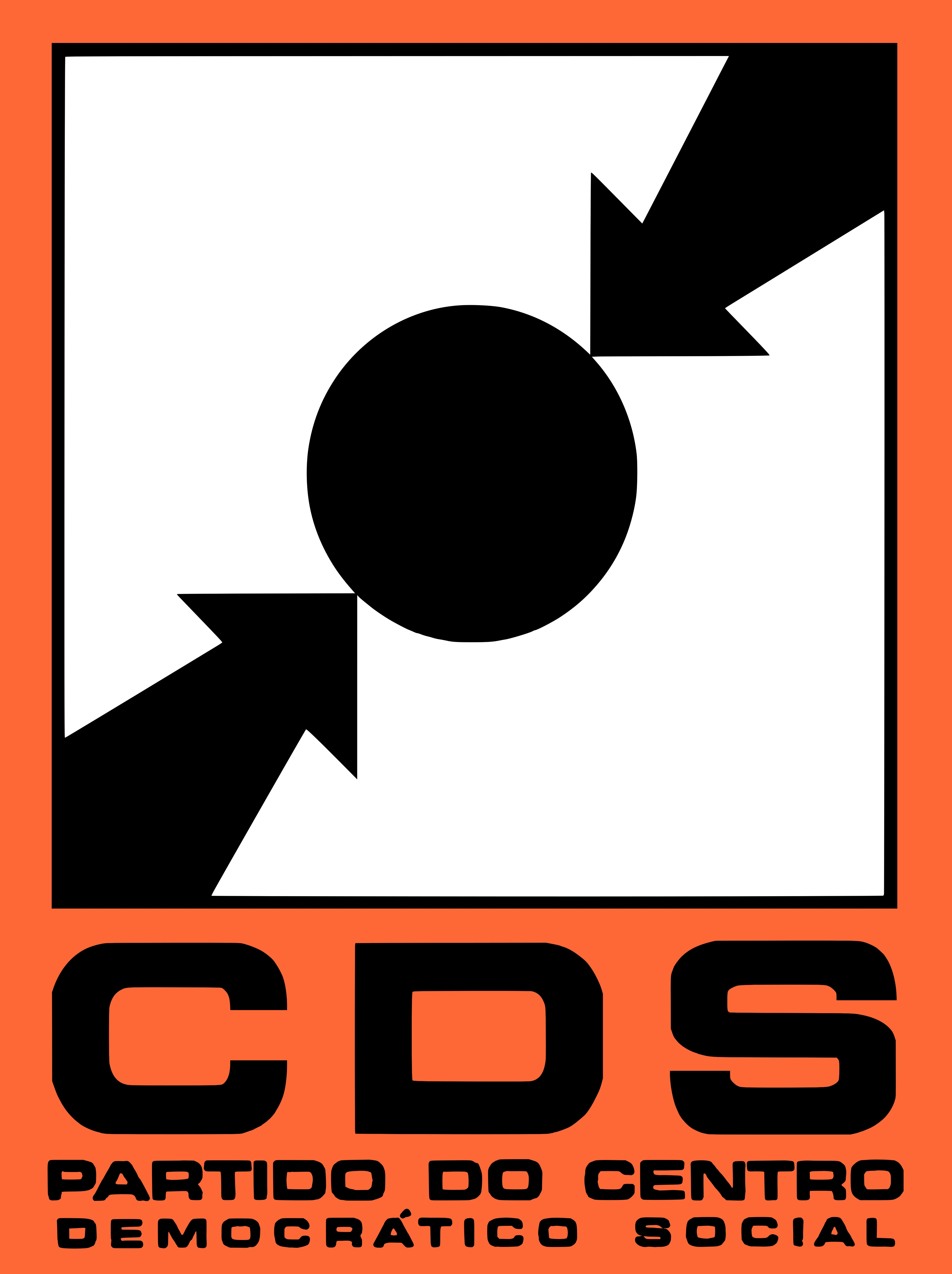
Party logo, 1974–1982

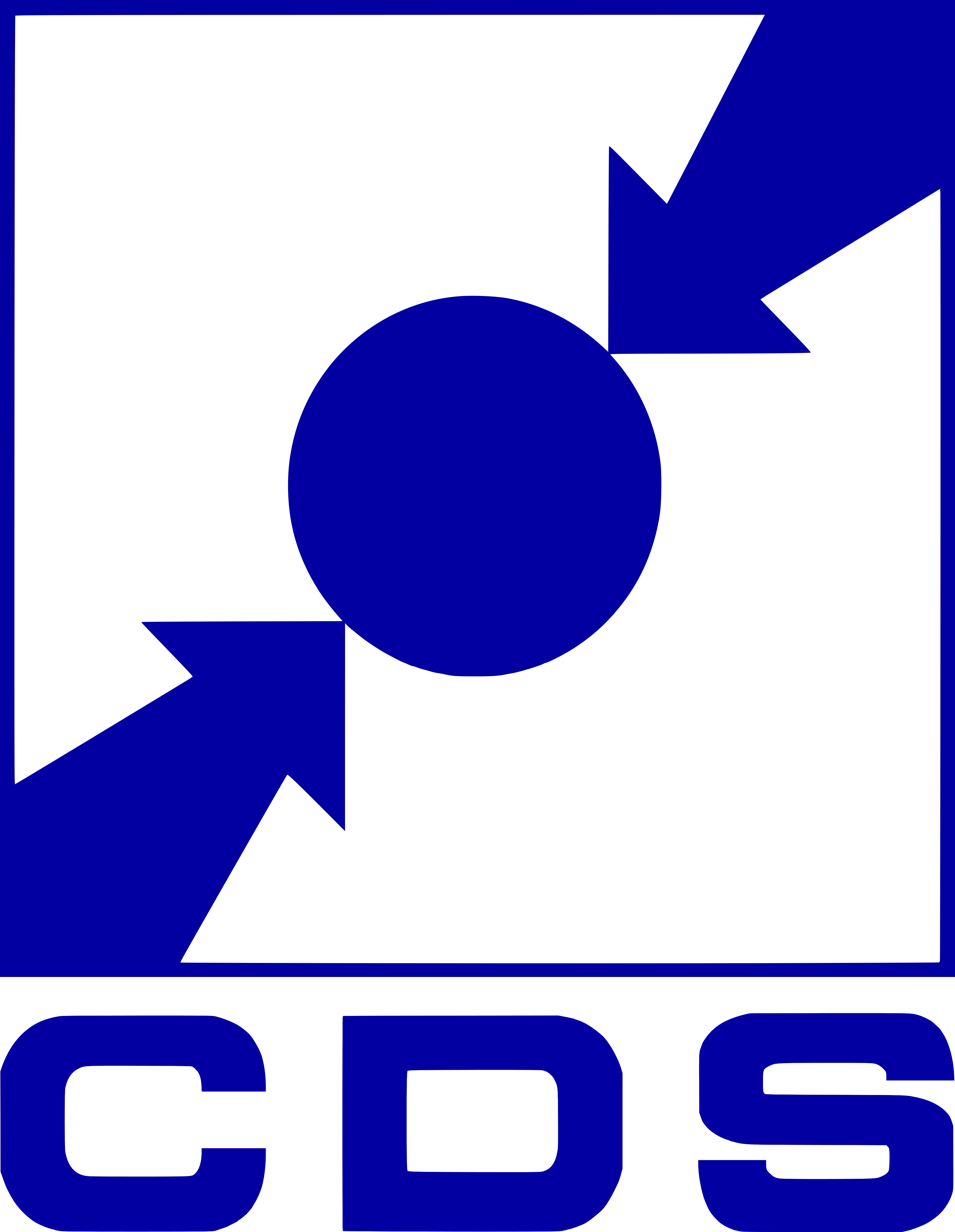
Party logo, 1982–1993

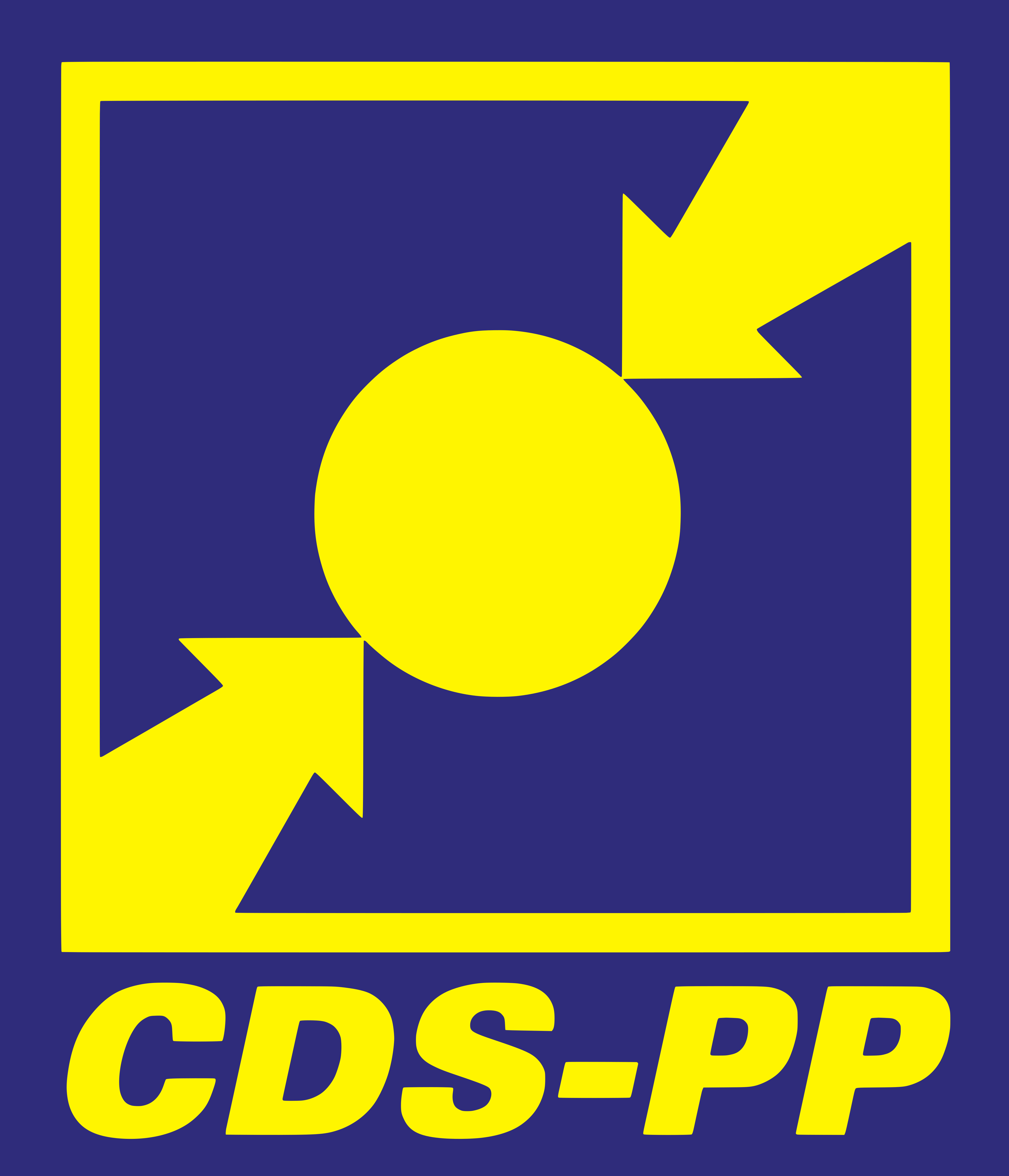
Party logo, 1993–2009

Current logo, since 2009

=== Leadership ===
==== List of leaders ====
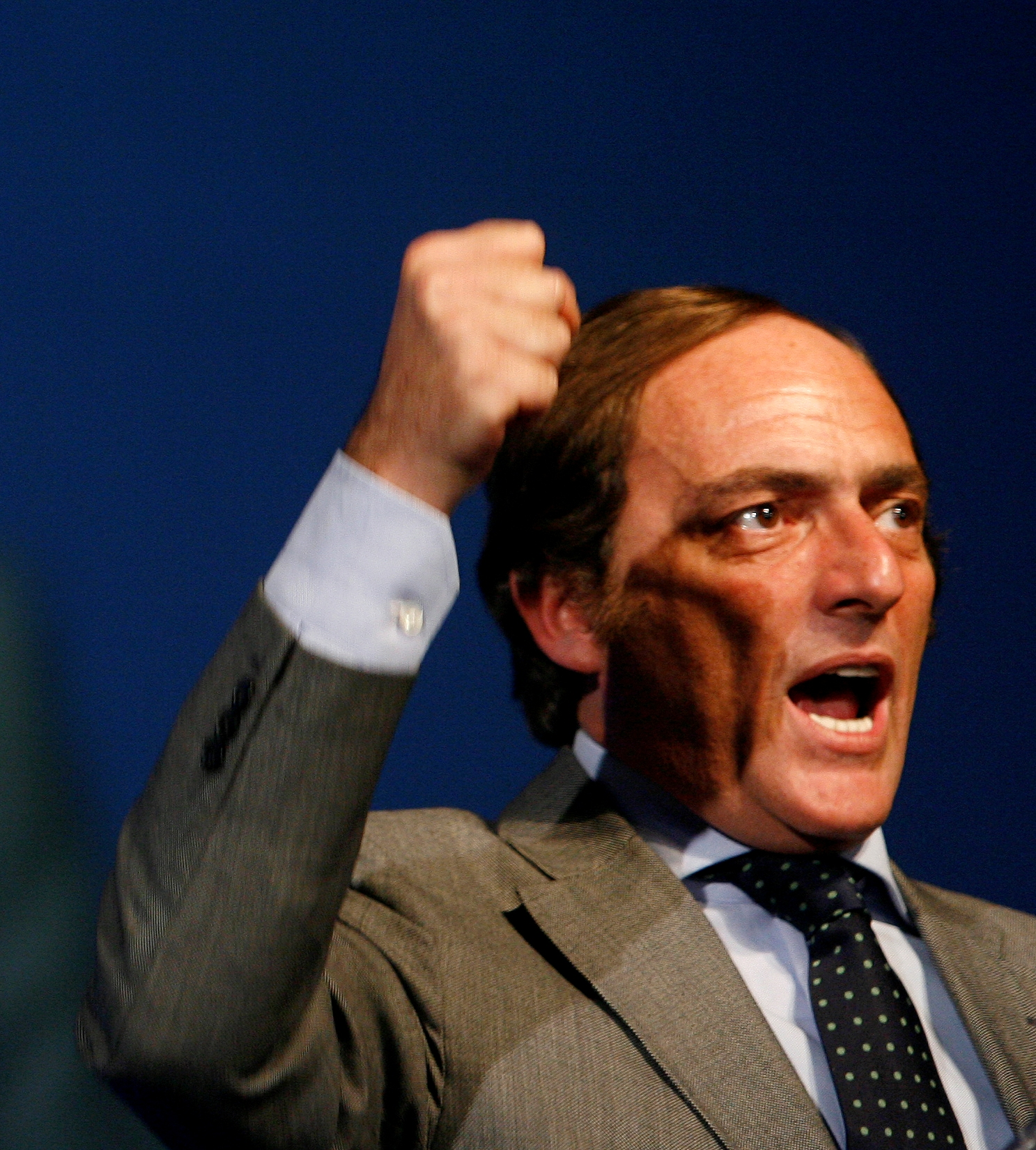
Paulo Portas was leader of the CDS-PP from 1998 to 2005, and again from 2007 to 2016.

Name		Start	End
1st	Diogo Freitas do Amaral (1st time)	19 July 1974	20 February 1983
2nd	Francisco Lucas Pires	20 February 1983	24 February 1985
3rd	Adriano Moreira	24 February 1985	31 January 1988
4th	Diogo Freitas do Amaral (2nd time)	31 January 1988	22 March 1992
5th	Manuel Monteiro	22 March 1992	22 March 1998
6th	Paulo Portas (1st time)	22 March 1998	24 April 2005
7th	José Ribeiro e Castro	24 April 2005	21 April 2007
8th	Paulo Portas (2nd time)	21 April 2007	12 March 2016
9th	Assunção Cristas	13 March 2016	26 January 2020
10th	Francisco Rodrigues dos Santos	26 January 2020	3 April 2022
11th	Nuno Melo	3 April 2022	Present day

=== List of parliamentary leaders ===
- Victor Sá Machado (1975–1976)
- Adelino Amaro da Costa (1976–1978)
- Narana Coissoró (1st time) (1978–1983)
- José Luís Nogueira de Brito (1983–1985)
- Narana Coissoró (2nd time) (1985–1991)
- António Lobo Xavier (1991–1995)
- Maria José Nogueira Pinto (1995–1996)
- Jorge Ferreira (1996–1998)
- Luís Queiró (1998–1999)
- Paulo Portas (1999–2001)
- Basílio Horta (2001–2002)
- Telmo Correia (1st time) (2002–2004)
- Nuno Melo (2004–2007)
- Diogo Feio (2007–2009)
- Pedro Mota Soares (2009–2011)
- Nuno Magalhães (2011–2019)
- Cecília Meireles (2019–2020)
- Telmo Correia (2nd time) (2020–2022)
- Vacant (2022–2024)
- Paulo Núncio (2024–present)

=== Political support ===
In line with the two largest parties in Portuguese politics, but unlike the two far-left parties, the CDS-PP is a big tent party, with appeal across social and ideological groups. The party's voters have a similar profile to the PSD. It has low voter loyalty, with voter retention historically being half the level of the three other largest parties.

The major issue on which the voter profile differs most significantly from the other parties is abortion, where those that identify as anti-abortion are significantly more likely to vote for the CDS-PP.

The CDS-PP receives a considerable amount of support amongst farmers in the north, as well as among entrepreneurs and managers.

=== International affiliations ===
The CDS-PP is a member party of the International Democracy Union (IDU) and European People's Party (EPP). One MEP currently sits in the EPP Group in the European Parliament.

It was formerly a member of the European Union of Christian Democrats (EUCD), as well as the EUCD-affiliated EPP's political group in the European Parliament, from 1986 to 1995. In 1995, the party –under the more Eurosceptic leadership of Manuel Monteiro– was kicked out of the EPP; it left the EUCD and joined the Union for Europe group in the European Parliament. In 2003, the party joined the European Democrats component of the European People's Party–European Democrats (EPP–ED) group. In 2006, it left the European Democrats –now collapsing due to the formation of the Movement for European Reform– to join the EPP group proper.

== Election results ==
=== Assembly of the Republic ===
Seat share in the Portuguese legislative elections

Election	Leader	Votes	%	Seats	+/-	Government
1975	Diogo Freitas do Amaral	434,879	7.6 (#4)	16 / 250		Constituent assembly
1976	Diogo Freitas do Amaral	876,007	16.0 (#3)	42 / 263	▲26	Opposition (Note: Coalition government with PS between January and August 1978. In Opposition between 1976 and January 1978; and then between August 1978 and 1979.)
1976	Diogo Freitas do Amaral	876,007	16.0 (#3)	42 / 263	▲26	Coalition
1976	Diogo Freitas do Amaral	876,007	16.0 (#3)	42 / 263	▲26	Opposition
1979	Diogo Freitas do Amaral	Democratic Alliance		43 / 250	▲1	Coalition
1980	Diogo Freitas do Amaral	Democratic Alliance		46 / 250	▲3	Coalition
1983	Francisco Lucas Pires	716,705	12.6 (#4)	30 / 250	▼16	Opposition
1985	Francisco Lucas Pires	577,580	10.0 (#5)	22 / 250	▼8	Confidence and supply
1987	Adriano Moreira	251,987	4.4 (#5)	4 / 250	▼18	Opposition
1991	Diogo Freitas do Amaral	254,317	4.4 (#4)	5 / 230	▲1	Opposition
1995	Manuel Monteiro	534,470	9.1 (#3)	15 / 230	▲10	Opposition
1999	Paulo Portas	451,543	8.3 (#4)	15 / 230	0	Opposition
2002	Paulo Portas	477,350	8.7 (#3)	14 / 230	▼1	Coalition (Note: Coalition government (PSD-CDS–PP).)
2005	Paulo Portas	416,415	7.2 (#4)	12 / 230	▼2	Opposition
2009	Paulo Portas	592,778	10.4 (#3)	21 / 230	▲9	Opposition
2011	Paulo Portas	652,194	11.7 (#3)	24 / 230	▲3	Coalition (Note: Coalition government (PSD-CDS–PP).)
2015	Paulo Portas	Portugal Ahead		18 / 230	▼6	Coalition (Note: Minority government (2015); Opposition (2015–2019).)
2015	Paulo Portas	Portugal Ahead		18 / 230	▼6	Opposition
2019	Assunção Cristas	221,094	4.2 (#5)	5 / 230	▼13	Opposition
2022	Francisco Rodrigues dos Santos	89,181	1.6 (#7)	0 / 230	▼5	Extra parliamentary
2024	Nuno Melo	Democratic Alliance		2 / 230	▲2	Coalition (Note: Minority Coalition government (PSD-CDS–PP).)
2025	Nuno Melo	Democratic Alliance		2 / 230	0	Coalition

=== Presidential ===
Election	Candidate	First round		Second round		Result
Election	Candidate	Votes	%	Votes	%	Result
1976	Supported António Ramalho Eanes					Won ✓
1980	António Soares Carneiro	2,325,481	40.2 (#2)			Lost ✗
1986	Diogo Freitas do Amaral	2,629,597	46.3 (#1)	2,872,064	48.8 (#2)	Lost ✗
1991	Basílio Horta	696,379	14.2 (#2)			Lost ✗
1996	No candidate					
2001	Supported Joaquim Ferreira do Amaral					Lost ✗
2006	Supported Aníbal Cavaco Silva					Won ✓
2011	Supported Aníbal Cavaco Silva					Won ✓
2016	Supported Marcelo Rebelo de Sousa					Won ✓
2021	Supported Marcelo Rebelo de Sousa					Won ✓
2026	Supported Luís Marques Mendes					Lost ✗

=== European Parliament ===
Election	Leader	Votes	%	Seats	+/-	EP group
1987	Francisco Lucas Pires	868,718	15.4 (#3)	4 / 24	New	EPP
1989	Francisco Lucas Pires	587,497	14.2 (#4)	3 / 24	▼1	EPP
1994	Manuel Monteiro	379,044	12.5 (#3)	3 / 25	0	EDA
1999	Paulo Portas	283,067	8.2 (#4)	2 / 25	▼1	UEN
2004	Luís Queiró	Forward Portugal		2 / 24	0	EPP-ED
2009	Nuno Melo	298,423	8.4 (#5)	2 / 22	0	EPP
2014	Nuno Melo	Portugal Alliance		1 / 21	▼1	EPP
2019	Nuno Melo	204,792	6.2 (#5)	1 / 21	0	EPP
2024	Ana Miguel Pedro	Democratic Alliance		1 / 21	0	EPP

=== Local ===
Results of CDS and CDS-led coalitions. Elected officials from the 1979 and 1982 elections only from CDS sole lists.

Election	Leader	Votes	%	Mayors	+/-	Councillors	+/-	Assemblies	+/-	Parishes	+/-	Parish Assemblies	+/-
1976	Diogo Freitas do Amaral	692,869	16.6 (#4)	36 / 304		317 / 1,906		1,048 / 5,130		533 / 4,035		5,086 / 26,268	
1979	Diogo Freitas do Amaral	Democratic Alliance		20 / 305	▼16	165 / 1,937	▼152	863 / 9,926	▼185	390 / 4,042	▼143	4,260 / 41,199	▲826
1982	Diogo Freitas do Amaral	Democratic Alliance		27 / 305	▲7	191 / 1,949	▼26	1,014 / 10,001	▲151	413 / 4,050	▲23	4,944 / 42,199	▲684
1985	Francisco Lucas Pires	471,838	9.7 (#4)	27 / 305	0	224 / 1,981	▲33	1,019 / 6,730	▲5	518 / 4,138	▲105	4,532 / 32,016	▼412
1989	Diogo Freitas do Amaral	452,110	9.1 (#4)	20 / 305	▼7	179 / 1,997	▼45	702 / 6,763	▼317	348 / 4,207	▼170	3,442 / 33,130	▼1,090
1993	Manuel Monteiro	455,357	8.4 (#4)	13 / 305	▼7	133 / 2,011	▼46	557 / 6,792	▼144	249 / 4,220	▼99	2,719 / 33,544	▼723
1997	Manuel Monteiro	302,763	6.3 (#4)	8 / 305	▼5	87 / 2,021	▼46	450 / 6,807	▼107	168 / 4,240	▼81	1,917 / 34,008	▼802
2001	Paulo Portas	210,173	4.0 (#4)	3 / 308	▼5	48 / 2,044	▼39	282 / 6,876	▼168	88 / 4,129	▼80	1,066 / 34,569	▼851
2005	José Ribeiro e Castro	165,832	3.1 (#4)	1 / 308	▼2	30 / 2,046	▼18	196 / 6,885	▼86	67 / 4,125	▼21	832 / 34,498	▼234
2009	Paulo Portas	171,370	3.1 (#5)	1 / 308	0	31 / 2,078	▲1	254 / 6,946	▲58	53 / 4,107	▼14	699 / 34,672	▼133
2013	Paulo Portas	168,959	3.4 (#5)	5 / 308	▲4	52 / 2,086	▲21	253 / 6,487	▼1	55 / 3,085	▲2	804 / 27,167	▲105
2017	Assunção Cristas	214,184	4.1 (#5)	6 / 308	▲1	53 / 2,074	▲1	234 / 6,461	▼19	60 / 3,083	▲5	816 / 27,005	▲12
2021	Francisco Rodrigues dos Santos	94,549	1.9 (#7)	6 / 308	0	36 / 2,064	▼17	141 / 6,448	▼93	44 / 3,066	▼16	468 / 26,790	▼348
2025	Nuno Melo	73,140	1.3 (#7)	6 / 308	0	33 / 2,058	▼3	103 / 6,464	▼38	48 / 3,221	▲4	416 / 27,997	▼52

=== Regional assemblies ===
Region	Election	Leader	Votes	%	Seats	+/-	Government
Azores	2024	Artur Lima	PSD/CDS/PPM		2 / 57	▼1	Coalition (Note: Minority coalition government PSD-CDS–PP-PPM)
Madeira	2025	José Manuel Rodrigues	4,289	3.0 (#5)	1 / 47	▼1	Coalition (Note: Coalition government (PSD-CDS–PP).)
