= Same-sex marriage in Portugal =

Same-sex marriage has been legal in Portugal since 5 June 2010. The XVIII Constitutional Government of Portugal under Prime Minister José Sócrates introduced a bill for legalization in December 2009. It was passed by the Assembly of the Republic in February 2010, and was declared legally valid by the Portuguese Constitutional Court in April. On 17 May, President Aníbal Cavaco Silva ratified the law, making Portugal the sixth country in Europe and the eighth in the world, after the Netherlands, Belgium, Spain, Canada, South Africa, Norway and Sweden, to allow same-sex marriage. The law was published in the Diário da República on 31 May and became effective on 5 June 2010. Polling suggests that a significant majority of Portuguese people support the legal recognition of same-sex marriage.

Portugal has also recognized same-sex de facto unions, providing several of the rights and benefits of marriage, since 2001.

== Background ==
=== De facto unions ===
A de facto union (Portuguese: união de facto, pronounced [uˈnjɐ̃w̃ dɨ ˈfaktu]; Mirandese: ounion de fato) provides opposite-sex and same-sex couples with similar rights and benefits as marriage. Same-sex de facto unions were established by Law no. 7/2001 (Lei n.º 7/2001) in 2001.

=== Constitutional Court ruling ===
On 1 February 2006, a lesbian couple, Teresa Pires and Helena Paixão, applied for a marriage licence. Their application was refused, but they pledged to challenge the ban in court, arguing that it discriminated against them on the basis of their sexual orientation, which is illegal under the Constitution of Portugal. In May 2007, a lower court rejected the motion, prompting the couple to appeal to the Portuguese Constitutional Court. The court received the case in July 2007. On 19 October 2007, the couple's lawyer, Luís Grave Rodrigues, presented their arguments, including seven legal opinions (pareceres) from Portuguese professors of law asserting that the ban on same-sex marriage was unconstitutional.

On 9 July 2009, the Constitutional Court decided in a 3–2 vote that the Constitution did not demand the recognition of same-sex marriage, but also did not oppose it, and that the decision had to be made by the Assembly of the Republic.

== Legislative action ==
Laws regarding same-sex partnerships in Europe¹ Marriage Civil union Limited domestic recognition (cohabitation) Unrecognized Constitution limits marriage to opposite-sex couples ¹ May include recent laws or court decisions that have not yet entered into effect.

=== 2008 bills ===
Two bills to legalize same-sex marriage were presented to Parliament on 10 October 2008. The bills were introduced separately by the Left Bloc (BE) and the Green Party (PEV). Both bills were rejected by Parliament on opposition from the governing Socialist Party (PS) and the opposition Social Democratic Party (PSD).

=== Passage of legislation in 2010 ===
Prime Minister José Sócrates stated on 18 January 2009 that, if re-elected in the September 2009 elections, he planned to introduce a bill to grant same-sex couples the right to marry. While the bill did not contemplate adoption, most LGBT organizations in Portugal supported the measure as an important step. In March 2009, Jorge Lacão, the Secretary of State for the Presidency of the Council of Ministers, confirmed that the Socialist government intended to legalize same-sex marriage if re-elected in 2009. Leader of the conservative Social Democratic Party Manuela Ferreira Leite expressed her opposition to the recognition of same-sex marriage.

In May 2009, a grassroots movement, the Movement for Equality in Access to Civil Marriage (Movimento pela Igualdade no acesso ao casamento civil), was formed to campaign for the proposed same-sex marriage bill. It attracted the support of several Portuguese celebrities, including Nobel Prize winner José Saramago and the Mayor of Lisbon, António Costa. In October, the newly re-elected Sócrates affirmed that the Socialist Party would move forward with its campaign promise to legalize same-sex marriage. The proposition received strong support from the Left Bloc, with its parliamentary leader, Francisco Louçã, presenting his own bill to legalize same-sex marriage. In mid-October 2009, Lacão said it was likely that same-sex marriage would be legalised in early 2010. On 3 November, José Ribeiro e Castro, a deputy from the CDS – People's Party, called for a referendum on the issue, but the Prime Minister, the Socialist Party and the Left Bloc rejected the idea.

On 4 November 2009, Francisco Assis, the parliamentary leader of the Socialist Party, said that the same-sex marriage bill would be voted on soon and confirmed that the bill would not allow same-sex couples to adopt children. The government gave its official approval to the same-sex marriage bill on 17 December. On 8 January 2010, after a debate which included the intervention of Prime Minister Sócrates, the Assembly of the Republic passed the bill in first reading by 122 votes to 95, (Note: Many media outlets reported the vote as being 125 in favour to 97 against; however, three Socialist MPs and two Social Democratic MPs were absent from the Assembly during the vote, resulting in the vote being 122–95.) and rejected bills introduced by the Left Bloc and the Green Party, as well as a measure to create civil unions submitted by the PSD. The Constitutional Affairs Committee approved the bill on 10 February, and it passed its final parliamentary vote on 11 February 125–95 with support from the Socialist Party, the Left Bloc, the Greens and the Communist Party. The legislation was submitted to President Aníbal Cavaco Silva on 24 February. On 13 March, Cavaco Silva asked the Constitutional Court to verify whether the bill was constitutional. The court ruled 11–2 on 8 April that the bill was constitutional, with three members concluding that the Constitution requires the recognition of same-sex marriages. The ruling was published in the official gazette on 28 April, giving Cavaco Silva twenty days to sign, or veto, the bill. On 17 May, he signed the bill into law. It was published in the Diário da República on 31 May and became effective on 5 June 2010. On 7 June, Teresa Pires and Helena Paixão, the couple who had originally challenged the same-sex marriage ban in court in 2006, became the first same-sex couple to marry in Portugal, exchanging vows at the registry office in Lisbon. The first same-sex marriage in the Azores was performed on 29 August 2010 on Terceira.

11 February 2010 vote in the Assembly of the Republic
Party	Voted for	Voted against	Abstained	Absent (Did not vote)
G Socialist Party	94: Rosa Albernaz; Maria Almeida Santos; Miguel Almeida; Mota Andrade; Horácio Antunes; Glória Araújo; Nuno Araújo; Francisco Assis; Maria Augusto; Vítor Baptista; Paula Barros; Paulo Barradas; José Bianchi; Filipe Brandão; Sofia Cabral; Eduardo Cabrita; Miranda Calha; Afonso Candal; Vitalino Canas; Conceição Casa Nova; Frederico Castro; Osvaldo Castro; Celeste Correia; João Paulo Correia; Alberto Costa; Duarte Cordeiro; Miguel Coelho; Isabel Coutinho; José Rui Cruz; Teresa Damásio; Luiz Fagundes Duarte; Jorge Fão; Pedro Farmhouse; Custódia Fernandes; Lúcio Ferreira; Sónia Fertuzinhos; Luís França; Anabela Freitas; Miguel Freitas; Vítor Fontes; João Galamba; Maria Gamboa; António Gameiro; Jorge Gonçalves; Ricardo Gonçalves; Luís Gonelha; José Jardim; Fernando Jesus; Odete João; Marques Júnior; Miguel Laranjeiro; José Lello; Maria Lurdes Ruivo; Jamila Madeira; Catarina Marcelino; Hortense Martins; Rosalina Martins; José Medeiros; Inês Medeiros; Manuela Melo; Ana Mendonça Mendes; Defensor Moura; Mário Mourão; Manuel Mota; Bravo Nico; Isabel Oneto; João Pedrosa; Eurídice Pereira; Rui Pereira; José Pereira Marques; Acácio Pinto; Paulo Pisco; Luís Pita Ameixa; João Portugal; Ramos Preto; Rui Prudêncio; José Ribeiro; Maria Rebelo; Ricardo Rodrigues; Maria Roseira; Marcos Sá; Nuno Sá; Maria Santos; Luísa Salgueiro; Renato Sampaio; Manuel Seabra; António Seguro; Jorge Seguro Sanches; João Serrano; João Sequeira; João Soares; Sérgio Sousa Pinto; Jorge Strecht; Ana Vitorino	2: Maria Rosário Carneiro; Teresa Venda	–	–
Social Democratic Party	–	72	6: Francisca Almeida; Pedro Duarte; José Eduardo Martins; Luísa Roseira; ?; ?	3: Luís Menezes; Pedro Rodrigues; Sérgio Vieira
CDS – People's Party	–	21: João Almeida; Raúl Almeida; Helder Amaral; Abel Baptista; Altino Bessa; Pedro Brandão Rodrigues; Teresa Caeiro; Telmo Correia; Assunção Cristas; Isabel Galriça Neto; Filipe Lobo D'Ávila; Nuno Magalhães; Cecília Meireles; Pedro Mota Soares; Paulo Portas; João Rebelo; Artur Rêgo; José Ribeiro e Castro; José Manuel Rodrigues; João Serpa Oliva; Michael Seufert	–	–
Left Bloc	16: Mariana Aiveca; Rita Calvário; Ana Drago; Jorge Duarte Costa; Luís Fazenda; José Gusmão; Cecília Honório; Francisco Louçã; Catarina Martins; Helena Pinto; José Manuel Pureza; João Semedo; Pedro Filipe Soares; Pedro Soares; José Moura Soeiro; Heitor Sousa	–	–	–
Portuguese Communist Party	13: Bruno Dias; António Filipe; Agostinho Lopes; Francisco Lopes; Jorge Machado; Honório Novo; João Oliveira; Rita Rato; Paula Santos; Bernardino Soares; José Soeiro; Jerónimo Sousa; Miguel Tiago	–	–	–
Ecologist Party "The Greens"	2: Heloísa Apolónia; José Luís Ferreira	–	–	–
Total (Note: The President of the Assembly of the Republic, Jaime Gama, votes only in case of a tied vote.)	125	95	6	3
Total	54.6%	41.5%	2.6%	1.3%

Article 1577 of the Portuguese Civil Code was amended to read: Marriage is a contract between two persons who intend to found a family through a full communion of life, in accordance with the provisions of this Code. (Note: Portuguese: Casamento é o contrato celebrado entre duas pessoas que pretendem constituir família, mediante uma plena comunhão de vida, nos termos das disposições deste Código.) On 19 July 2010, the Institute of Registries and Notary (Instituto dos Registos e do Notariado) published guidelines stating that marriages conducted abroad must be transcribed by civil registries even if they were performed before the legalization of same-sex marriage, that marriages performed under alternative legislation, such as civil partnerships and civil unions, cannot be transcribed, that foreign nationals can marry in Portugal even if marriage between same-sex couples is not recognized in their country of origin, and that same-sex foreign nationals can marry in Portugal without the need to establish residency.

=== Adoption and parenting ===
On 24 February 2012, Parliament rejected two bills which would have allowed married same-sex couples to adopt children. On 17 May 2013, Parliament rejected a bill to allow same-sex couples to adopt in a 77–104 vote. That same day, Parliament approved a proposal in first reading to allow married same-sex spouses to adopt their partner's children (i.e. stepchild adoption); however, that bill was rejected in second reading on 14 March 2014 in a 107–112 vote. On 17 January 2014, Parliament approved a resolution to hold a referendum on adoption rights for same-sex couples. On 28 January, President Cavaco Silva asked the Constitutional Court to verify whether the resolution was constitutional. The court declared the resolution unconstitutional on 19 February 2014, and Cavaco Silva vetoed it the following day.

On 20 November 2015, Parliament approved 5 bills in first reading granting adoption rights to same-sex spouses. The bills were immediately sent to the Committee for Constitutional Affairs, Rights, Freedoms and Guarantees. On 16 December, the committee merged the bills into a single proposal and voted in favour of its approval. On 18 December, the bill was approved by Parliament in its second and final vote. President Cavaco Silva vetoed the bill on 23 January 2016, with the decision being announced publicly on 25 January. On 10 February, the veto was overridden by Parliament. The law was published in the official journal on 29 February, and took effect the first day of the first month after publication (i.e. 1 March 2016).

== Marriage statistics ==
By June 2011, one year after the law had come into force, approximately 380 same-sex marriages had taken place in Portugal. Figures for 2020 are lower than previous years because of the restrictions in place due to the COVID-19 pandemic.

Number of marriages and divorces in Portugal
Year	Same-sex marriages			Total marriages	Same-sex divorces			Total divorces
Year	Female	Male	Total	Total marriages	Female	Male	Total	Total divorces
2010	89	177	266	39,993	0	0	0	27,556
2011	103	221	324	36,035	1	5	6	27,098
2012	108	216	324	34,423	6	12	18	25,722
2013	98	207	305	31,998	10	19	29	22,784
2014	127	181	308	31,478	16	19	35	22,239
2015	127	223	350	32,393	18	20	38	23,633
2016	173	249	422	32,399	16	23	39	22,649
2017	241	282	523	33,634	28	36	64	21,930
2018	265	342	607	34,637	27	49	76	20,776
2019	319	358	677	33,272	53	52	105	20,846
2020	209	236	445	18,902	40	46	86	17,684
2021	262	287	549	29,057	48	44	92	17,685
2022	388	413	801	36,952	74	67	141	18,956
2023	461	548	1,009	36,980	62	65	127	17,948

== Religious performance ==
Most religious denominations in Portugal do not support same-sex marriage and do not allow their clergy to bless or officiate at marriages of same-sex couples. The Catholic Church was opposed to the law and, while Portugal is a constitutional secular country, its status as a historically Catholic country was also a reason for the media sensationalism which heightened the controversy over the law. On 13 May 2010, during an official visit to Portugal four days before the ratification of the law, Pope Benedict XVI affirmed his opposition to same-sex marriage, describing it as "insidious and dangerous". A few months earlier, 5,000 people had demonstrated against the legalization of same-sex marriage in a march in Lisbon. In December 2023, the Holy See published Fiducia supplicans, a declaration allowing Catholic priests to bless couples who are not considered to be married according to church teaching, including the blessing of same-sex couples. The Portuguese Episcopal Conference welcomed the declaration. In September 2024, Father João Emanuel Pereira blessed a same-sex couple in Porto, which caused some controversy in Catholic circles.

Some smaller Christian denominations also do not permit their clergy to solemnise or bless same-sex unions, including the Evangelical Presbyterian Church in Portugal, the Portuguese Evangelical Lutheran Church, and the Lusitanian Catholic Apostolic Evangelical Church.

== Public opinion ==
A 2008 survey by the Catholic University of Portugal showed that 42% of Portuguese people supported same-sex marriage, while 11% supported some form of civil union but not marriage and 33% were opposed to all legal recognition for same-sex couples. The 2015 Eurobarometer found that 61% of Portuguese people thought same-sex marriage should be allowed throughout Europe, while 33% were opposed. A Pew Research Center poll, conducted between April and August 2017 and published in May 2018, showed that 59% of Portuguese people supported same-sex marriage, 28% were opposed and 13% did not know or had refused to answer. When divided by religion, 82% of religiously unaffiliated people, 64% of non-practicing Christians and 43% of church-attending Christians supported same-sex marriage. Opposition was 14% among 18–34-year-olds.

The 2019 Eurobarometer found that 74% of Portuguese people thought same-sex marriage should be allowed throughout Europe, while 20% were opposed. A 2023 Ipsos poll showed that 80% of Portuguese people supported same-sex marriage, while 11% supported civil unions or other types of partnerships but not marriage, 5% were undecided and 4% were opposed to all recognition for same-sex couples. The 2023 Eurobarometer showed that support had increased to 81%, while 14% were opposed. The survey also found that 73% of Portuguese people thought that "there is nothing wrong in a sexual relationship between two persons of the same sex", while 23% disagreed.

== See also ==
- De facto union in Portugal
- LGBT rights in Portugal
- Recognition of same-sex unions in Europe
