= Mariana Mortágua =

Portuguese economist and politician (born 1986)

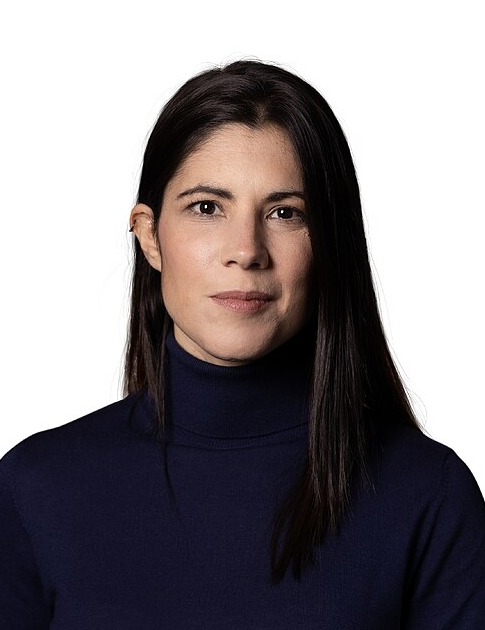
- Mortágua in 2023

National Coordinator of the Left Bloc
- In office 28 May 2023 – 30 November 2025
- Preceded by: Catarina Martins
- Succeeded by: José Manuel Pureza

Member of the Assembly of the Republic
- In office 31 August 2013 – 1 January 2026
- Succeeded by: Fabian Figueiredo
- Constituency: Lisbon

Personal details
- Born: Mariana Rodrigues Mortágua; 24 June 1986 (age 40) Alvito, Portugal
- Party: Left Bloc
- Spouse: Joana Pires Teixeira (m. 2024)
- Relatives: Joana Mortágua (twin sister); Maria João Rodrigues (cousin)
- Occupation: Economist • Politician

Mariana Rodrigues Mortágua (born 24 June 1986) is a Portuguese economist and politician who was the National Coordinator of the Left Bloc, from 28 May 2023 until 30 November 2025. In 2013, she was elected to the Assembly of the Republic of Portugal, replacing Ana Drago.

== Early life ==
Mortágua is the daughter of Camilo Mortágua, an anti-Salazar activist, revolutionary, and founding member of LUAR. She is the twin sister of Joana Mortágua, also MP of the Left Bloc, and distant cousin of Socialist politician Maria João Rodrigues.

She holds a degree and a master's degree in Economics from ISCTE - Instituto Universitário de Lisboa, having completed her PhD in economics at the School of Oriental and African Studies (SOAS) at the University of London.

She made her debut as a deputy in the Assembly of the Republic at the age of 27, in 2013, due to the need to replace Ana Drago in the Lisbon constituency, where she was elected. Her appointment in September 2013 to the top positions on the list of candidates for deputies by the Political Commission of the BE was contested by a group of militants, who criticized the "technocratic criteria" that guided her choice. In view of this, the BE confirmed that Mariana Mortágua was considered as the element that "would best serve the interests of the party in the Assembly of the Republic, due to her knowledge in the area of the Economy", something that had "been felt since the departure of Francisco Louçã".

She later gained particular visibility in Portuguese politics after her performance in the parliamentary inquiry of Zeinal Bava and Ricardo Salgado, in the context of the bankruptcy of the BES bank.

She was re-elected as a deputy in the 2015 legislative elections, which gave the Bloco de Esquerda its highest vote ever. She was a member of the Economy and Public Works Commission, the Budget, Finance and Public Administration Commission and the Eventual Commission for Monitoring the Measures of the Financial Assistance Program for Portugal. She was re-elected as a deputy in October 2019.

In September 2016, she stated that, "from a practical point of view, the first thing we have to do is lose the shame of looking for someone who is accumulating money" and that "we cannot be ashamed of having a social policy of this kind."

She was again reelected in 2022, despite the poor results of the Left Bloc. After Catarina Martins decided not to run again in the upcoming Congress, Mariana Mortágua announced her candidacy to the leadership of the party, receiving wide support from party members. On 28 May, Mariana Mortágua was elected Left Bloc's new coordinator, with the support of 493 out of 528 delegates for her motion, and 490 out of 600 delegates for her list for the BE's national board on party's convention in Lisbon.

== Political views ==
Mortágua is interested in various humanitarian causes, especially women's rights and LGBT rights. She awakened to the cause of feminism in her youth, when she was part of the Young Association for Justice and Peace (AJP), led by feminist Teresa Cunha.

Mortágua regularly participates in LGBT pride marches. However, she stated in an interview "today the gay parades are no longer political marches, they are publicity marches", contrary to when they were a "cause against capitalism".

== Support for Palestine ==
In late August 2025, Portuguese politician and economist Mariana Mortágua joined the Global Sumud Flotilla, a large international initiative organized by civil society groups to deliver humanitarian aid to Gaza and challenge the Israeli naval blockade. She was one of three Portuguese figures on board, alongside actor Sofia Aparício and activist Miguel Duarte. During the trip, Mortágua criticized the Portuguese government for refusing to provide diplomatic support for the mission and expressed concern about drone surveillance of the fleet at sea.

== Personal life ==
In April 2023, she claimed on SIC Notícias she was being politically targeted through lawsuits filed by Marco Galinha, chairman of the Global Media Group, and Chega, a right-wing populist political party in Portugal, and noted "I know that this type of pressure and political persecution will continue and will even rise in tone and level, whether because I am a woman, because I am on the left, whether because I am a lesbian woman, whether because I am the daughter of an anti-fascist resistance fighter, or because apparently I have the gift of bothering some people with a lot of power".

== Publications ==
- 2012 — The Portuguese debt crisis: deconstructing myths in The Political Economy of Public Debt and Austerity in the EU (with Francisco Louçã)
- 2012 — A Dividadura - Portugal na Crise do Euro
- 2012 — Isto é um assalto
- 2013 — Temos de Pagar a Dívida? (with Miguel Cardina, N. Serra and José Soeiro)
- 2013 — Não acredite em tudo o que pensa. (with Francisco Louçã)
- 2014 — A Europa à Beira do Abismo (withTony Phillips, Roberto Lavagna, Christina Laskaridis, Anzhela Knyazeva, Diana Knyazeva e Joseph Stiglitz)
- 2015 — Privataria: Quem ganha e quem perde com as privatizações em Portugal (with Jorge Duarte Costa)
- 2021 — No Sonho Selvagem do Alquimista
- 2025 — Oportunidade ou Maldição - A indústria do turismo em Portugal (with Ana Drago)

== Electoral history ==
=== BE leadership election, 2023 ===
Ballot: 28 May 2023
| Candidate | Votes | % |
|---|---|---|
| Mariana Mortágua | 439 | 83.1 |
| Pedro Soares | 78 | 14.8 |
| Abstentions | 11 | 2.1 |
| Turnout | 528 | 80.74 |
Source: Results

=== Legislative election, 2024 ===
Ballot: 10 March 2024
| Party | Candidate | Votes | % | Seats | +/− |
|---|---|---|---|---|---|
| AD | Luís Montenegro | 1,867,442 | 28.8 | 80 | +3 |
| PS | Pedro Nuno Santos | 1,812,443 | 28.0 | 78 | –42 |
| Chega | André Ventura | 1,169,781 | 18.1 | 50 | +38 |
| IL | Rui Rocha | 319,877 | 4.9 | 8 | ±0 |
| BE | Mariana Mortágua | 282,314 | 4.4 | 5 | ±0 |
| CDU | Paulo Raimundo | 205,551 | 3.2 | 4 | –2 |
| Livre | Rui Tavares | 204,875 | 3.2 | 4 | +3 |
| PAN | Inês Sousa Real | 126,125 | 2.0 | 1 | ±0 |
| ADN | Bruno Fialho | 102,134 | 1.6 | 0 | ±0 |
| Other parties | | 104,167 | 1.6 | 0 | ±0 |
| Blank/Invalid ballots | | 282,243 | 4.4 | – | – |
| Turnout | | 6,476,952 | 59.90 | 230 | ±0 |
Source: Comissão Nacional de Eleições

=== Legislative election, 2025 ===
Ballot: 18 May 2025
| Party | Candidate | Votes | % | Seats | +/− |
|---|---|---|---|---|---|
| AD | Luís Montenegro | 2,008,488 | 31.8 | 91 | +11 |
| PS | Pedro Nuno Santos | 1,442,546 | 22.8 | 58 | –20 |
| Chega | André Ventura | 1,438,554 | 22.8 | 60 | +10 |
| IL | Rui Rocha | 338,974 | 5.4 | 9 | +1 |
| Livre | Rui Tavares | 257,291 | 4.1 | 6 | +2 |
| CDU | Paulo Raimundo | 183,686 | 2.9 | 3 | –1 |
| BE | Mariana Mortágua | 125,808 | 2.0 | 1 | –4 |
| PAN | Inês Sousa Real | 86,930 | 1.4 | 1 | ±0 |
| ADN | Bruno Fialho | 81,660 | 1.3 | 0 | ±0 |
| Other parties | | 95,384 | 1.5 | 1 | +1 |
| Blank/Invalid ballots | | 260,648 | 4.1 | – | – |
| Turnout | | 6,319,969 | 58.25 | 230 | ±0 |
Source: Comissão Nacional de Eleições
