= Pedro Soares =

Pedro Soares may refer to:

- Pedro Soares de Sousa (16th century), third Donatary-Captain for the island of Santa Maria
- Pedro Soares (politician) (born 1957), Portuguese politician
- Pedro Soares (judoka) (born 1974), Portuguese judoka
- Pedro Mota Soares (born 1974), Portuguese politician
- Pedro Filipe Soares (born 1979), Portuguese politician
- Pedro Soares (footballer, born 1987), Portuguese football goalkeeper
- Pedro Soares (footballer, born 1999), Portuguese football midfielder
- Pedro dos Santos Soares (born 1915), Portuguese communist

== See also ==
- Pedro Soares Muñoz (1916-1991), Brazilian politician
