= José Manuel Pureza =

Portuguese professor and politician

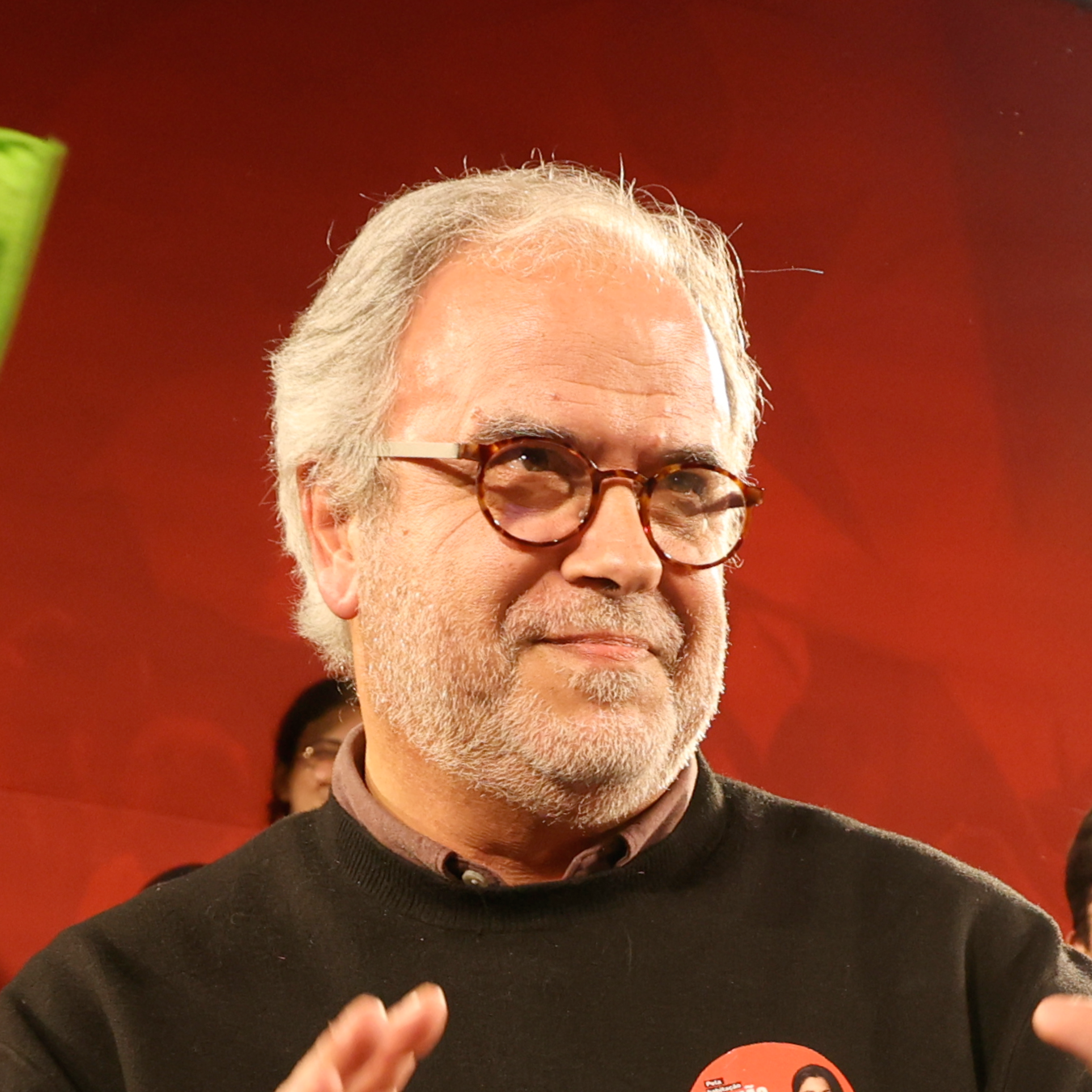
- Pureza in 2024

National Coordinator of the Left Bloc
- Incumbent
- Assumed office 30 November 2025
- Preceded by: Mariana Mortágua

Vice President of the Assembly of the Republic
- In office 28 October 2015 – 29 March 2022
- President: Eduardo Ferro Rodrigues

President of the Left Bloc's Parliamentary group
- In office 15 October 2009 – 19 June 2011
- Preceded by: Luís Fazenda
- Succeeded by: Luís Fazenda

Member of the Assembly of the Republic
- In office 23 October 2015 – 29 March 2022
- Constituency: Coimbra
- In office 15 October 2009 – 19 June 2011
- Constituency: Coimbra

Personal details
- Born: José Manuel Marques da Silva Pureza; 18 December 1958 (age 67) Coimbra, Portugal
- Party: Left Bloc
- Education: University of Coimbra
- Occupation: Sociologist • Professor • Politician

José Manuel Marques da Silva Pureza (born 18 December 1958) is a Portuguese sociology professor and politician. A member of the Left Bloc, he was elected to the Assembly of the Republic, for the first time, in 2009, but failed to secure his re-election in 2011, having returned for a second period, after being elected again, in 2015. In the 2006 presidential election, he was the national campaign chair of the candidacy of Francisco Louçã.
