= Isabel Pires =

Portuguese politician (born 1990)

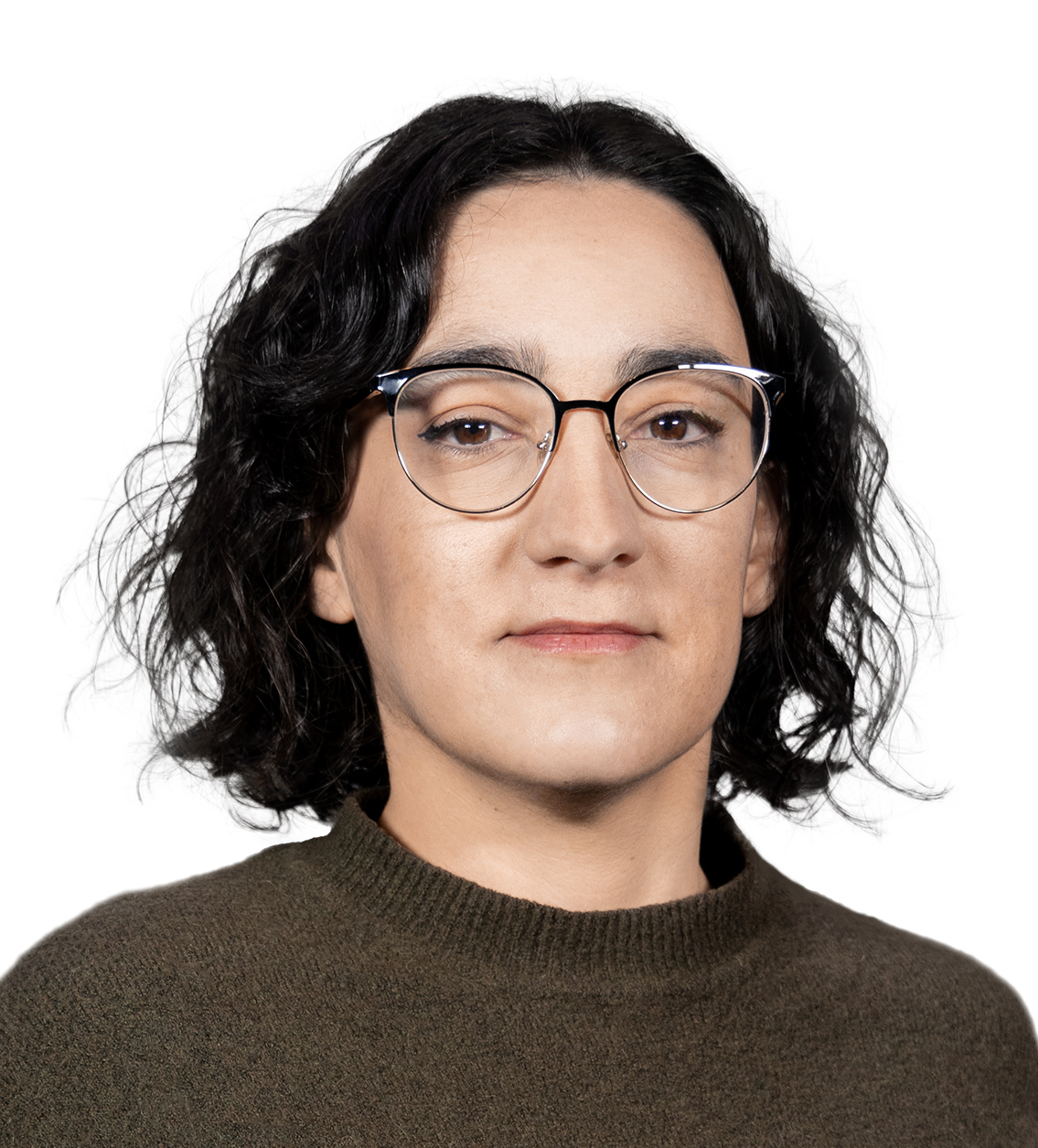
- Pires in January 2024

Member of the Assembly of the Republic
- In office 14 September 2023 – 25 March 2024
- Preceded by: Catarina Martins
- Constituency: Porto
- In office 23 October 2015 – 28 March 2022
- Constituency: Lisbon

Personal details
- Born: Isabel Cristina Rua Pires; 21 June 1990 (age 36) Vila Nova de Gaia, Portugal
- Party: Left Bloc
- Education: NOVA University Lisbon

Isabel Cristina Rua Pires (born 21 June 1990) is a Portuguese politician and former member of the Assembly of the Republic, the national legislature of Portugal. A member of the Left Bloc, she has represented Lisbon from October 2015 to March 2022 and Porto from September 2023 to March 2024. She had also been a temporary substitute member of the Assembly from February 2023 to August 2023.

== Early life ==
Pires was born on 21 June 1990 in Vila Nova de Gaia. She lived in Gaia until she was 19 when she moved to Lisbon to study. She has a degree in political science and international relations from NOVA University Lisbon (she had started her studies in language, literature and culture before switching subjects). She was a student activist, organinsing general strikes and demonstrations. She received a master's degree in political science from NOVA in 2021 after producing a thesis titled Evolução do Nacionalismo Catalão: fatores institucionais e políticos, consequências e resultados.

== Career ==
Pires worked in call centres.

Pires has been a member of the Left Bloc (BE) since 2008. She is a member of BE's political committee. She has been a member of Lisbon City Council since 2013. She was elected to the Assembly of the Republic at the 2015 legislative election. She was re-elected at the 2019 legislative election. At the 2022 legislative election Pires was placed third on BE's list of candidates in Porto but the party only won two seats in the constituency. She was a temporary member of the Assembly of the Republic from February 2023 to August 2023, substituting for José Moura Soeiro. She was appointed to the Assembly as permanent member in September 2023 following the resignation of Catarina Martins. At the 2024 legislative election she was placed third on BE's list of candidates in Porto but the party again only won two seats in the constituency.

== Electoral history ==
Electoral history of Isabel Pires
Election	Constituency	Party	No.	Result
2015 legislative	Lisbon	Left Bloc	4	Elected
2017 local	Lisbon Municipal Assembly	Left Bloc	1	Elected
2019 legislative	Lisbon	Left Bloc	5	Elected
2021 local	Lisbon Municipal Assembly	Left Bloc	1	Elected
2022 legislative	Porto	Left Bloc	3	Not elected
2024 legislative	Porto	Left Bloc	3	Not elected
