= Diário de Lisboa =

Daily newspaper published in Lisbon, Portugal between 1921 and 1990

- Owner: Renascença Gráfica
- Founder: Joaquim Manso
- Founded: 7 April 1921
- Ceased publication: 30 November 1990
- City: Lisbon
- Country: Portugal

The Diário de Lisboa was a daily evening newspaper published in the Portuguese capital of Lisbon between 1921 and 1990.

== History ==
The newspaper was founded on 7 April 1921 by Joaquim Manso, who ran it until he died in 1956. He was succeeded by Norberto Lopes between 1956 and 1967. It was published for the last time in 1990, when Mário Mesquita was the director. The company was owned by Renascença Gráfica and was edited in Rua Luz Soriano (Luz Soriano Street) in Lisbon. Since 2009, 500 copies of one annual issue have been printed in order to protect the rights to the Diário de Lisboa title.

== Contributors ==
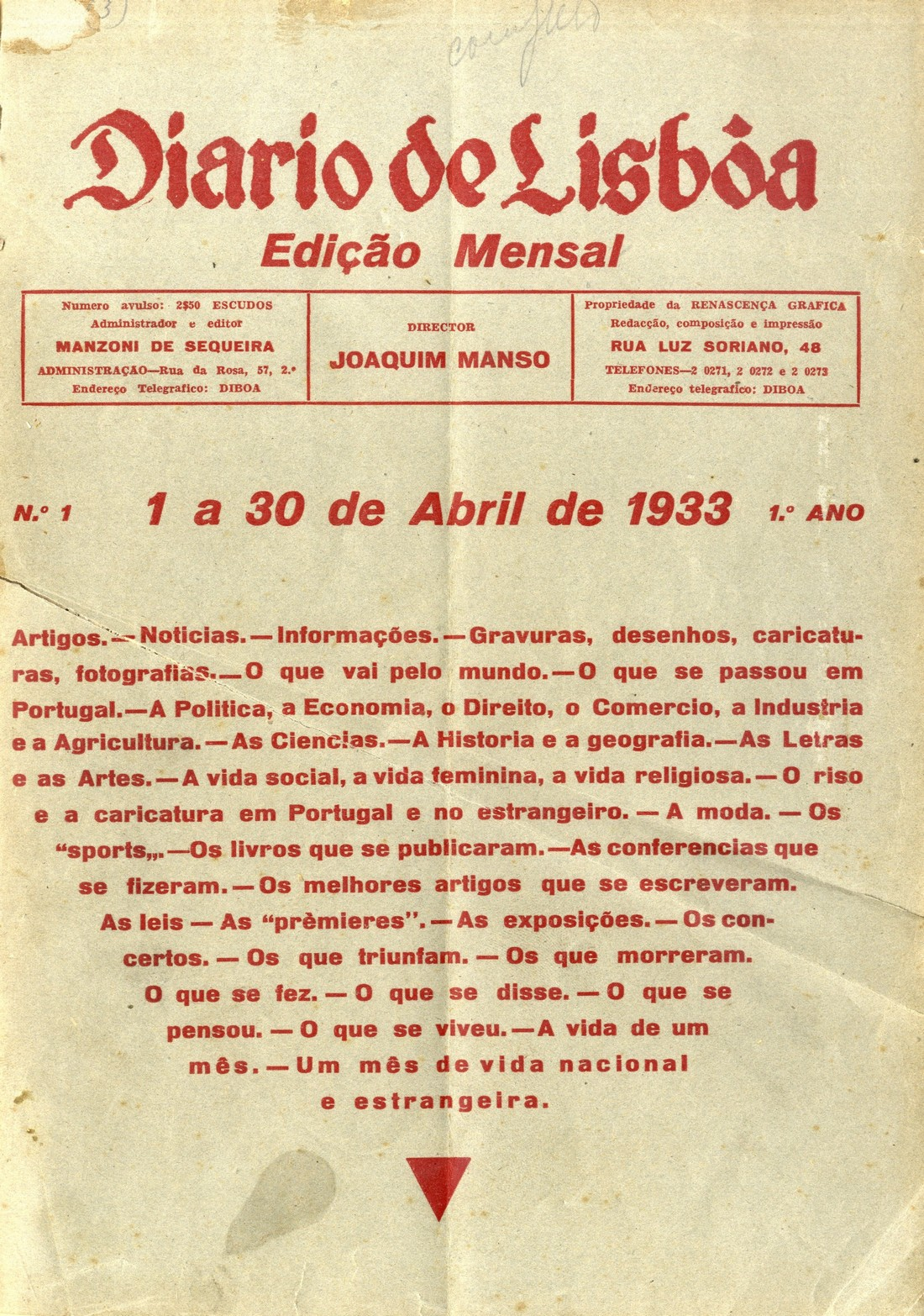

Published throughout the lifetime of the Estado Novo dictatorship, when censorship was common, the Diário de Lisboa took more risks than most other papers and provided an outlet for some views considered controversial by the regime. It stands out, in the context of the Portuguese press at the time, for the independence of its opinions and for its literary features that gave space to modernist writers and artists. In 1934, it started to publish a "Literary Supplement", which continued throughout the 1930s. Among its contributors were the poet Fernando Pessoa, the poet and novelist Fernando Assis Pacheco, the novelist José Saramago, the novelist and playwright Luís de Sttau Monteiro, the university professor and author Eduardo Prado Coelho, the journalist Fernando Dacosta, and the film director and actor João César Monteiro. Feminist views were represented by Maria Teresa Horta and Manuela Porto, among others. Features were included on the modern art of artists such as José de Almada Negreiros, Eduardo Viana, Sarah Affonso, and Mily Possoz and the paper also promoted their exhibitions. It also featured regular articles by Ramón Gómez de la Serna, a Spanish writer.

== The Carnation Revolution ==
The Diário de Lisboa covered the Carnation Revolution, which overthrew the Estado Novo on 25 April 1974, initially relying on communiqués from the Armed Forces, who had led the revolution. By 27 April, the paper was featuring cartoons by Abel Manta that had been banned by the censors in 1969. On 2 May, a photograph of the crowd gathered at the Estádio 1º de Maio in Lisbon, estimated at 500,000, occupied almost the entire front page, with the heading "The united people will never be defeated".

The paper took full advantage of the end of censorship, with reports in May on topics such as feminism, sexual minorities, and the abolition of censorship. It was soon printing political theory by people such as the German-American Herbert Marcuse. In mid-May, Helena Neves, who belonged to the Central Committee of the Portuguese Communist Party, and had been arrested a few days before the Carnation Revolution, wrote about the humiliation, suffering and violence experienced by women. The following day Maria Isabel Barreno questioned the oppression of women in a male society and addressed an unprecedented topic in a Portuguese newspaper, that of women's sexual pleasure.

The end of the 1900s was a particularly difficult time for many newspapers in Portugal and the Diário de Lisboa was one of those forced by financial pressures to close down, publishing its last issue on 30 November 1990.
