= Helena Neves =

Portuguese feminist, communist, journalist, academic and politician

- Born: 1945 (age 80–81); Lisbon, Portugal
- Other names: Maria Helena Augusto das Neves Gorjão
- Occupation: Journalist
- Known for: Journalist, feminist, communist, academic and left-wing politician who was arrested on three occasions by the Estado Novo government

Helena Neves was an active Portuguese communist and feminist and an opponent of the Estado Novo regime in Portugal, being imprisoned on three occasions. She became a successful journalist and was a deputy in the Portuguese parliament, the Assembly of the Republic, in 2001–02. She was also a professor on gender and the women's movement at the Universidade Lusófona (Lusophone University) in Lisbon.

== Early life ==
Maria Helena Augusto das Neves Gorjão was born in the Portuguese capital of Lisbon on 17 June 1945. Her paternal grandfather was an anarchist and an atheist but her father was a supporter of António de Oliveira Salazar, the Portuguese dictator, and an employee of the Fundação Nacional para Alegria no Trabalho (Foundation for Joy at Work), a state-sponsored body, and made her mother stop being a primary school teacher in order to assume what the state then considered to be her natural role of "wife and mother". Neves joined the Portuguese Communist Party (PCP) while still at High School at the age of 17. At school she caused a scandal by writing a play and having it performed in front of the teachers, in which an old student recalls his passage through high school, reliving the absurd prohibitions and hidden love affairs. She then studied Philosophy at the Faculty of Letters of the University of Lisbon but was suspended for 40 days and had her scholarship withdrawn because of her activities with the University's PCP group, which included being attacked by Portugal's secret police, the PIDE. After obtaining a degree, she then studied for a master's degree in Sociology at the NOVA University Lisbon.

== First arrest ==
Neves, along with Helena Pato and others, founded the Movimento Democrático de Mulheres (Democratic Women's Movement - MDM) in 1969. In October of the same year, she was imprisoned in Caxias prison near Lisbon by the PIDE, after she had been nominated by the Portuguese Democratic Movement (MDP) as a candidate for parliamentary deputy for Santarém. Her husband, Joaquim Fernando Gorjão Duarte, was arrested at the same time. Neves was released after three months, the maximum time a person could be held without being tried, but her husband was sent for trial. After this arrest she was prevented from teaching for "not guaranteeing State Security" and then started a journalistic career at the daily Diário de Lisboa, after a brief stint at a newspaper in Santarém before it was closed down by the PIDE. At the Diário de Lisboa she directed the Women's Supplement but also worked on a socio-cultural supplement called Mesa Redonda (Round Table). She left after a year after her salary was reduced as a sanction for having signed a document that demanded freedom of the press.

== Union activities ==
In 1970, she met the leading feminist activist, Maria Lamas, who had returned to Portugal after an exile of around eight years in Paris. They met clandestinely in a chapel, opened for them by a sympathetic priest. Neves says that Lamas had a profound effect on her. In the same year, she was selected to be director of the Press Office of the Union of Office Employees of Lisbon and the south of Portugal. At the same time, she was part of a team, which, in a semi-clandestine fashion, created in October 1971 the Intersindical Nacional, the forerunner of the General Confederation of the Portuguese Workers (Confederação Geral dos Trabalhadores Portugueses), which is now the largest trade union federation in Portugal. Neves was responsible for producing the bulletin of the Intersindical.

== Journalism and writing ==
In 1972 Neves joined the editorial staff of the magazine Modas e Bordados, a supplement of the daily newspaper O Século. After editorial disagreements she moved to another paper, the Jornal República, to edit a supplement called Presença da Mulher (Presence of Women). She was then invited to work for a new paper, Actividades Económicas (Economic Activities). She travelled to France to report on the conditions faced by Portuguese emigrants, also using the trip as an opportunity to build up a network of people opposed to the Portuguese regime. Actividades Económicas was closed down by the censors almost immediately after its launch. In 1972 she wrote the text for Raízes da Nossa Força, a book of photographs by Alfredo Cunha about children from slums in the Lisbon region. The book was seized by PIDE for "incitement". In 1975, another book, Mulheres de um tempo ainda presente (Women of a time still present), was seized by the police from the printing press. From this book, her short story "Deolinda" was selected for an Anthology of the Best Contemporary Portuguese Writing and published in 1994.

== Subsequent arrests ==
Neves was a member of the Portuguese National Peace Council, having participated clandestinely, with the historian Ana Maria Alves, at a meeting of the Soviet Union-supported World Peace Council, held in East Berlin. A parliamentary candidate for the opposition in 1973, she was arrested for handing out leaflets and only released the day before the election. Neves was arrested for a third time in the early days of April 1974. She was released on 25 April 1974 as a result of the Carnation Revolution, which overthrew the authoritarian Estado Novo regime.

== Further journalism ==
Neves remained an active communist for some time after the Carnation Revolution, playing leading roles in several bodies associated with the Communist Party. She then became part of the editorial staff of the Communist newspaper Avante! where she was responsible for covering the topics of women's rights and agrarian reform. In 1979 she started working at Mulheres, a women's magazine, directed by Maria Lamas, with the newsroom headed by another leading feminist, Maria Teresa Horta. Neves was principal editor until 1980, when she was appointed deputy director, a position held until 1984, assuming the direction of the magazine, from 1984 to 1991, after the death Maria Lamas. She also contributed to a wide range of other papers and magazines and produced radio programmes for Radiodifusão Portuguesa. Representing the MDM and the PCP she was part of a mission to Panama and Cuba, where she met Fidel Castro.

== Resignation from the Communist Party ==
Neves resigned from the Communist Party in 1991 and joined the Left Bloc party, serving as a Deputy in the Assembly of the Republic in 2001–02. She was a member of the board of the Association for the Study of Women (APEM) until 1998, representing the association on the government Comissão para a Igualdade e para os Direitos das Mulheres (Commission for the Equality and Rights of Women). Neves became a professor and a member of the University Council at the Universidade Lusófona, a Lisbon-based private university that is owned by a company that administers universities in Portuguese-speaking countries. She was also a researcher at the Centre for Interdisciplinary Studies of the 20th Century, at the University of Coimbra. Her studies mainly focused on the theme of gender and on women's movements and on the work of the communist mathematician and statistician Bento de Jesus Caraça.

Helena Neves has two daughters.

== Selected publications ==
- CUNHA, Alfredo (1972), Raízes da Nossa Força. (Text by Helena Neves).
- NEVES, Helena (1975), Mulheres de um Tempo ainda presente. Orion, Amadora, Lisbon.
- NEVES, Helena (1988), Apontamentos para a História do MDM – o retomar dos gestos, MDM.
- NEVES, Helena (1999), Abril/Mulher, CML, MRR.
- NEVES, Helena (2001), O Estado Novo e as Mulheres, Lisboa, Câmara Municipal, Biblioteca Museu República e Resistência.
- NEVES, Helena (2004). Sexualidade e poder. In A Comuna, nº 4, March 2004, pp. 24–31.
