= Fabian Figueiredo =

Portuguese sociologist and politician

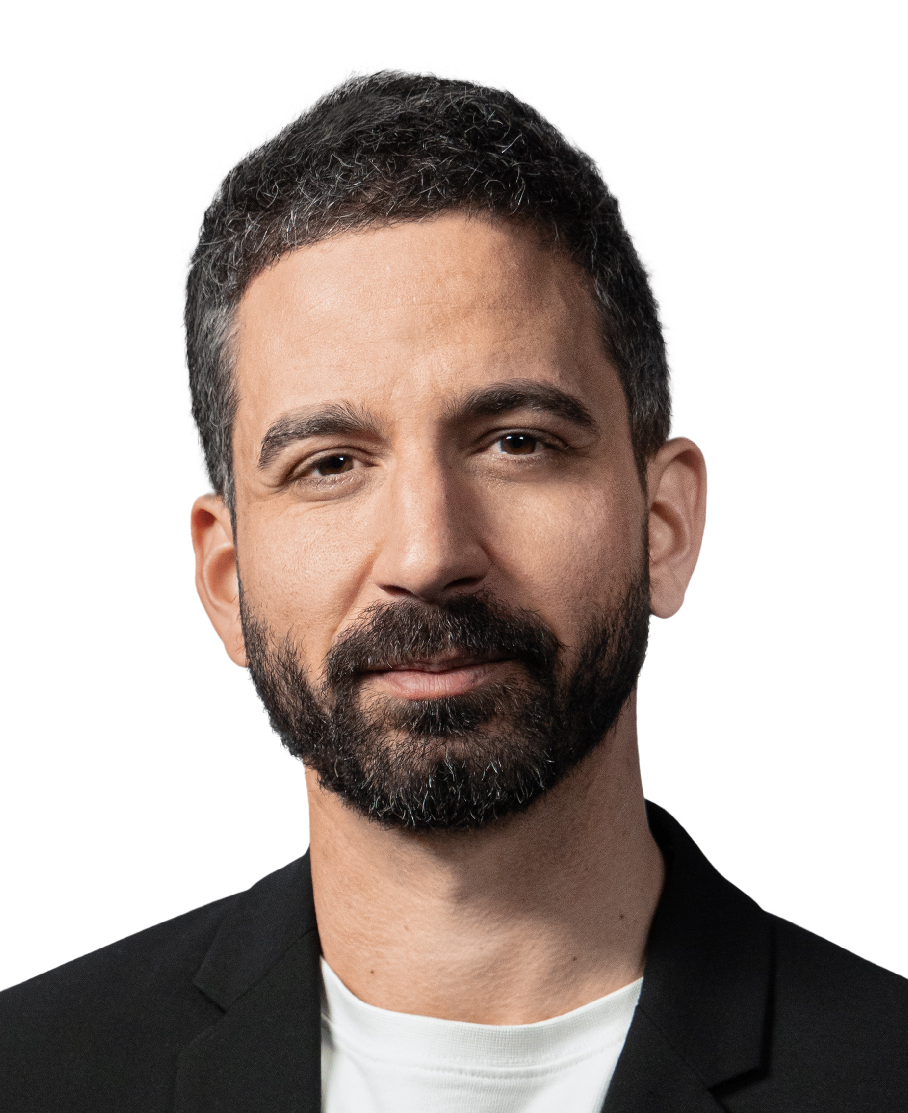
- Figueiredo in 2024

Member of the Assembly of the Republic
- Incumbent
- Assumed office 1 January 2026
- Preceded by: Mariana Mortágua
- Constituency: Lisbon
- In office 26 March 2024 – 2 June 2025
- Constituency: Lisbon
- In office 26 April 2021 – June 2021
- Preceded by: Pedro Filipe Soares
- Succeeded by: Pedro Filipe Soares
- Constituency: Lisbon

President of the Parliamentary Group of the Left Bloc
- In office 26 March 2024 – 2 June 2025
- Preceded by: Pedro Filipe Soares
- Succeeded by: Vacant office

Personal details
- Born: Fabian Filipe Figueiredo; 14 January 1989 (age 37) Zurich, Switzerland
- Party: Left Bloc
- Occupation: Politician, sociologist

Fabian Filipe Figueiredo (Note: European Portuguese pronunciation: [fɐbiˈɐ̃ fiˈlipɨ fiɡɐjˈɾedu].) (born 14 January 1989) is a Portuguese politician and sociologist from the Left Bloc. He has served as a member of the Assembly of the Republic since January 2026, having previously served from March 2024 to June 2025 and also from April to June 2021.

== Biography ==
Fabian Figueiredo was born in Zurich, Switzerland in 1989, but grew up in Santa Maria da Feira until he turned 18. He then studied Sociology in the Faculty of Economics of the University of Coimbra.

He was the national campaign director of Marisa Matias' 2016 presidential campaign. In 2017, he was the Left Bloc's candidate for Mayor of Loures, running, among others, against André Ventura, at the time the candidate from the PSD. He filled a crime complaint against Ventura after his controversial remarks about the Romani people. In 2021 he was once again a candidate for Mayor, failing once again to be elected.

In 2019, he was the 7th candidate on the BE's list from Lisbon. He later became a member of the Assembly of the Republic, replacing Pedro Filipe Soares temporarily.

In 2024, he was chosen as the 2nd candidate on the BE's list from Lisbon, only after party coordinator Mariana Mortágua, being elected to the Portuguese Parliament. After the election, he was chosen by the Left Bloc's political commission as the parliamentary leader of the Left Bloc, succeeding Pedro Filipe Soares, who retired from politics.

In 2025, after the Left Bloc suffered a defeat, gaining just 2% of the votes, he lost his seat. He returned to parliament in January 2026, following Mariana Mortágua's resignation, becoming the party's sole deputy.

== Electoral history ==
=== 2017 Loures City Council election ===
Ballot: 1 October 2017
Party	Candidate	Votes	%	Seats	+/−
CDU	Bernardino Soares	28,701	32.8	4	–1
PS	Sónia Paixão	24,737	28.2	4	±0
PSD/PPM	André Ventura	18,877	21.5	3	+1
BE	Fabian Figueiredo	3,107	3.5	0	±0
CDS–PP	Pedro Pestana Bastos	2,508	2.9	0	±0
PCTP/MRPP	João Resa	2,232	2.5	0	±0
PAN	Ana Sofia da Silva	1,824	2.1	1	new
Other parties		1,452	1.7	0	±0
Blank/Invalid ballots		4,162	4.8	–	–
Turnout		87,600	52.31	11	±0
Source: Autárquicas 2017

=== 2021 Loures City Council election ===
Ballot: 26 September 2021
Party	Candidate	Votes	%	Seats	+/−
PS	Ricardo Leão	25,777	31.5	4	±0
CDU	Bernardino Soares	23,756	29.1	4	±0
PSD	Nelson Batista	11,451	14.0	2	–1
CH	Bruno Nunes	6,884	8.4	1	new
BE	Fabian Figueiredo	3,170	3.9	0	±0
IL	Filomena Francisco	2,729	3.3	0	new
PAN	Soraya Ossman	1,834	2.2	0	±0
CDS–PP	Jorge Gomes dos Santos	1,251	1.5	0	±0
PCTP/MRPP	João Resa	1,249	1.5	0	±0
Blank/Invalid ballots		3,685	4.5	–	–
Turnout		81,786	48.32	11	±0
Source: Autárquicas 2021
