= Pedro Soares (footballer, born 1987) =

Portuguese footballer

Personal information
- Full name: Pedro Nuno dos Santos Soares
- Date of birth: 3 November 1987 (age 39)
- Place of birth: Porto, Portugal
- Height: 1.84 m (6 ft 1/2 in)
- Position: Goalkeeper

Team information
- Current team: Trofense
- Number: 1

Youth career
- 1998–2000: Boavista
- 2000: Pasteleira
- 2001: Águas Santas
- 2001–2006: Maia

Senior career*
Years	Team	Apps	(Gls)
2006–2008	Mai		
2008–2009	Lusitânia Lourosa		
2009–2012	Arouca	7	(0)
2012–2014	Tirsense	47	(0)
2014–2016	Varzim	44	(0)
2016–2017	Santa Clara	2	(0)
2017–2018	Gafanha	29	(0)
2018–2019	Fafe	35	(0)
2019–	Trofense	6	(0)
- * Club domestic league appearances and goals as of 22:52, 13 October 2019 (UTC)

Pedro Nuno dos Santos Soares (born 3 November 1987) is a Portuguese football player who plays for C.D. Trofense.

== Club career ==
He made his professional debut in the Segunda Liga for Arouca on 29 August 2010 in a game against Santa Clara.
