= Catarina Martins =

Portuguese politician

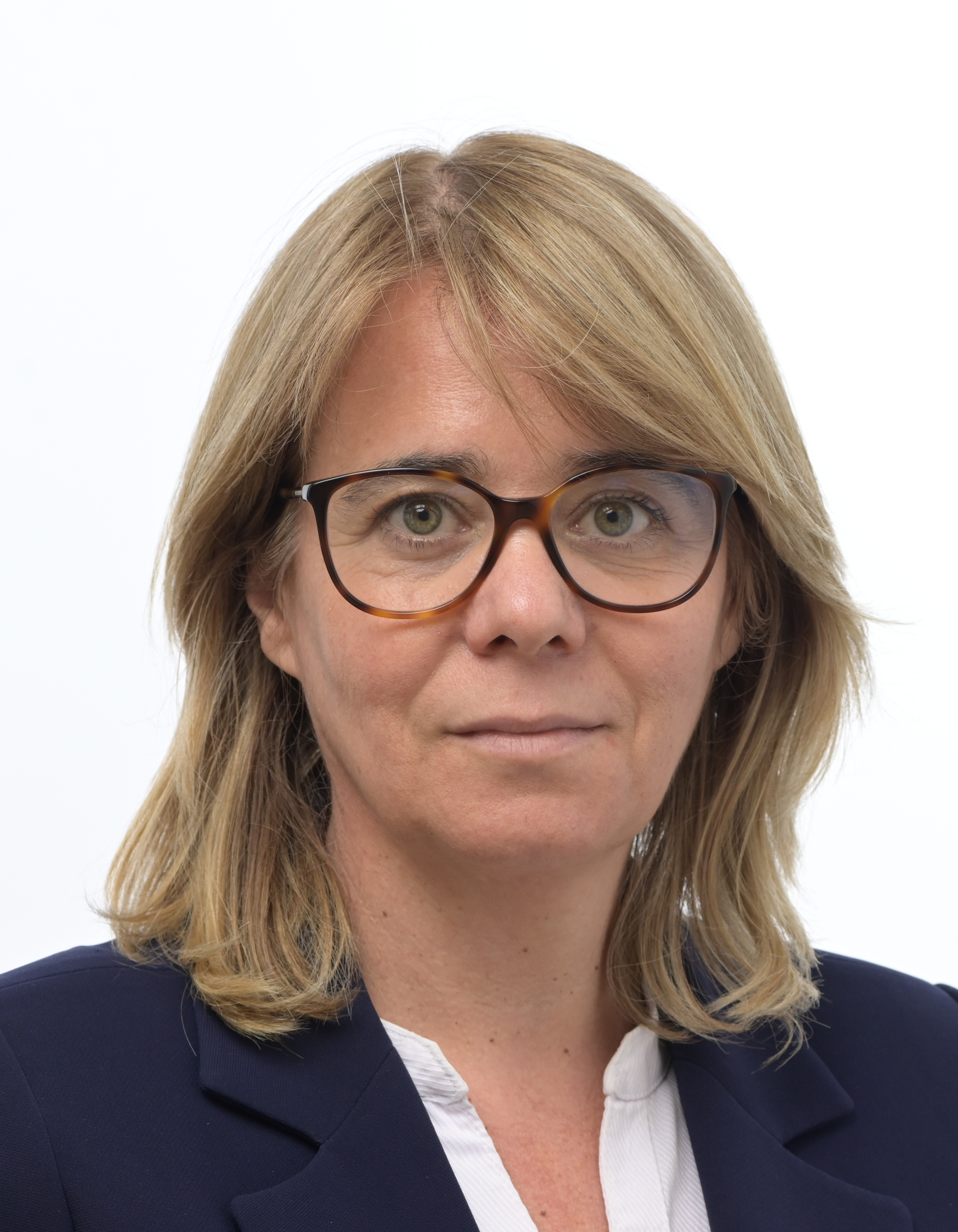
- Official portrait, 2024

National Coordinator of the Left Bloc
- In office 11 November 2012 – 28 May 2023 Serving with João Semedo until 30 November 2014
- Preceded by: Francisco Louçã
- Succeeded by: Mariana Mortágua

Member of the European Parliament
- Incumbent
- Assumed office 16 July 2024
- Constituency: Portugal

Member of the Assembly of the Republic
- In office 15 October 2009 – 14 September 2023
- Succeeded by: Isabel Pires
- Constituency: Porto

Personal details
- Born: Catarina Soares Martins; 7 September 1973 (age 53) Porto, Portugal
- Party: Left Bloc
- Spouse: Pedro Carreira
- Children: 2
- Occupation: Actress • Politician

Catarina Soares Martins (born 7 September 1973) is a Portuguese politician and actress. She was the national coordinator of the Left Bloc from 11 November 2012 until 28 May 2023, and was a member of the Assembly of the Republic for the Left Bloc from 2009 until 2023. She trained as a linguist and is active in theater.

Martins was elected a Member of the European Parliament in the 2024 European election, and was sworn-in in the Tenth European Parliament.

== Early life and career ==
Catarina Martins was born in Porto on 7 September 1973. She did three years of her primary school education in São Tomé and Príncipe and Cape Verde, and returned to Portugal when she was 9 years-old. She enrolled in the Faculty of Law of the University of Coimbra but abandoned her course in the third year. Afterwards she obtained a bachelor's degree in Languages and Literature and a master's degree in Linguistics. She also enrolled in a PhD in Language Teaching.

In 1994, she co-founded the theater company Companhia de Teatro de Visões Úteis in Porto.

== Political career ==
Martins was elected to the Portuguese parliament as the first Left Bloc representative from Porto in the 2009 Portuguese legislative election. On 11 November 2012, Catarina Martins and João Semedo were elected co-coordinators of the Left Bloc, successors to Francisco Louçã. Semedo quit on 30 November 2014 and Martins has been since the sole party coordinator. She was re-elected in the 2015 and 2019 elections. After the 2015 election the Left Bloc and the Portuguese Communist Party (PCP) agreed to support the government formed by António Costa of the Portuguese Socialist Party (PS). On 27 October 2021, the budget proposed by Costa was rejected by the BE and the PCP, leading to early elections. In the January 2022 Portuguese legislative election the BE lost 14 of its 19 seats in the Assembly, although Martins was re-elected in the Porto District constituency. On 14 February 2023, Martins announced that she won't run for re-election as the National Coordinator of the Left Bloc on party's XIII National Convention in May. On 28 May, Mariana Mortágua was elected Left Bloc new coordinator, thus ending Martins' 11-year tenure as party's leader.

== Personal life ==
Martins is married to Pedro Carreira, an actor trained in Physics, and has two daughters.

== Electoral history ==
=== BE leadership election, 2012 ===
Ballot: 30 November 2012
Candidate	Votes	%
João Semedo; Catarina Martins	359	76.5
João Madeira	110	23.5
Turnout	469	
Source: Results

=== BE leadership election, 2014 ===
Ballot: 23 November 2014
Candidate	Votes	%
João Semedo; Catarina Martins	266	50.8
Pedro Filipe Soares	258	49.2
Turnout	524	
Source: Results

=== Legislative election, 2015 ===
Ballot: 4 October 2015
Party	Candidate	Votes	%	Seats	+/−
PàF	Pedro Passos Coelho	2,085,465	38.6	107	–25
PS	António Costa	1,747,730	32.3	86	+12
BE	Catarina Martins	550,945	10.2	19	+11
CDU	Jerónimo de Sousa	445,901	8.3	17	+1
PAN	André Silva	75,170	1.4	1	+1
PDR	Marinho e Pinto	61,920	1.1	0	new
PCTP/MRPP	Garcia Pereira	60,045	1.1	0	±0
Other parties		178,937	3.3	0	±0
Blank/Invalid ballots		201,979	3.7	–	–
Turnout		5,408,092	55.84	230	±0
Source: Diário da República

=== Legislative election, 2019 ===
Ballot: 6 October 2019
Party	Candidate	Votes	%	Seats	+/−
PS	António Costa	1,903,687	36.3	108	+22
PSD	Rui Rio	1,454,283	27.8	79	–10
BE	Catarina Martins	498,549	9.5	19	±0
CDU	Jerónimo de Sousa	332,018	6.3	12	–5
CDS–PP	Assunção Cristas	221,094	4.2	5	–13
PAN	André Silva	173,931	3.3	4	+3
Chega	André Ventura	67,502	1.3	1	new
IL	Carlos Guimarães Pinto	67,443	1.3	1	new
Livre	Joacine Katar Moreira	56,940	1.1	1	+1
Other parties		207,162	4.0	0	±0
Blank/Invalid ballots		254,875	4.9	–	–
Turnout		5,237,484	48.60	230	±0
Source: Comissão Nacional de Eleições

=== Legislative election, 2022 ===
Ballot: 30 January 2022
Party	Candidate	Votes	%	Seats	+/−
PS	António Costa	2,302,601	41.4	120	+12
PSD	Rui Rio	1,618,381	29.1	77	–2
Chega	André Ventura	399,659	7.2	12	+11
IL	João Cotrim Figueiredo	273,687	4.9	8	+7
BE	Catarina Martins	244,603	4.4	5	–14
CDU	Jerónimo de Sousa	238,920	4.3	6	–6
CDS–PP	Rodrigues dos Santos	89,181	1.6	0	–5
PAN	Inês Sousa Real	88,152	1.6	1	–3
Livre	Rui Tavares	71,232	1.3	1	±0
Other parties		91,299	1.6	0	±0
Blank/Invalid ballots		146,824	2.6	–	–
Turnout		5,564,539	51.46	230	±0
Source: Comissão Nacional de Eleições

=== European Parliament election, 2024 ===
Ballot: 9 June 2024
Party	Candidate	Votes	%	Seats	+/−
PS	Marta Temido	1,268,915	32.1	8	–1
AD	Sebastião Bugalho	1,229,895	31.1	7	±0
Chega	António Tânger Corrêa	387,068	9.8	2	+2
IL	João Cotrim de Figueiredo	358,811	9.1	2	+2
BE	Catarina Martins	168,107	4.3	1	–1
CDU	João Oliveira	162,630	4.1	1	–1
Livre	Francisco Paupério	148,572	3.8	0	±0
ADN	Joana Amaral Dias	54,120	1.4	0	±0
PAN	Pedro Fidalgo Marques	48,006	1.2	0	–1
Other parties		48,647	1.2	0	±0
Blank/Invalid ballots		77,208	2.0	–	–
Turnout		3,951,979	36.63	21	±0
Source: Comissão Nacional de Eleições

=== Presidential election, 2026 ===
Ballot: 18 January and 8 February 2026
Candidate	First round		Second round	
Candidate	Votes	%	Votes	%
António José Seguro	1,755,563	31.1	3,502,613	66.8
André Ventura	1,327,021	23.5	1,737,950	33.2
João Cotrim de Figueiredo	903,057	16.0		
Henrique Gouveia e Melo	695,377	12.3		
Luís Marques Mendes	637,442	11.3		
Catarina Martins	116,407	2.1		
António Filipe	92,644	1.6		
Manuel João Vieira	60,927	1.1		
Jorge Pinto	38,588	0.7		
André Pestana	10,897	0.2		
Humberto Correia	4,773	0.1		
Blank/Invalid ballots	125,840	–	275,414	–
Turnout	5,768,536	52.39	5,515,977	50.03
Source: Comissão Nacional de Eleições
