= Luís Fazenda =

Portuguese politician (born 1957)

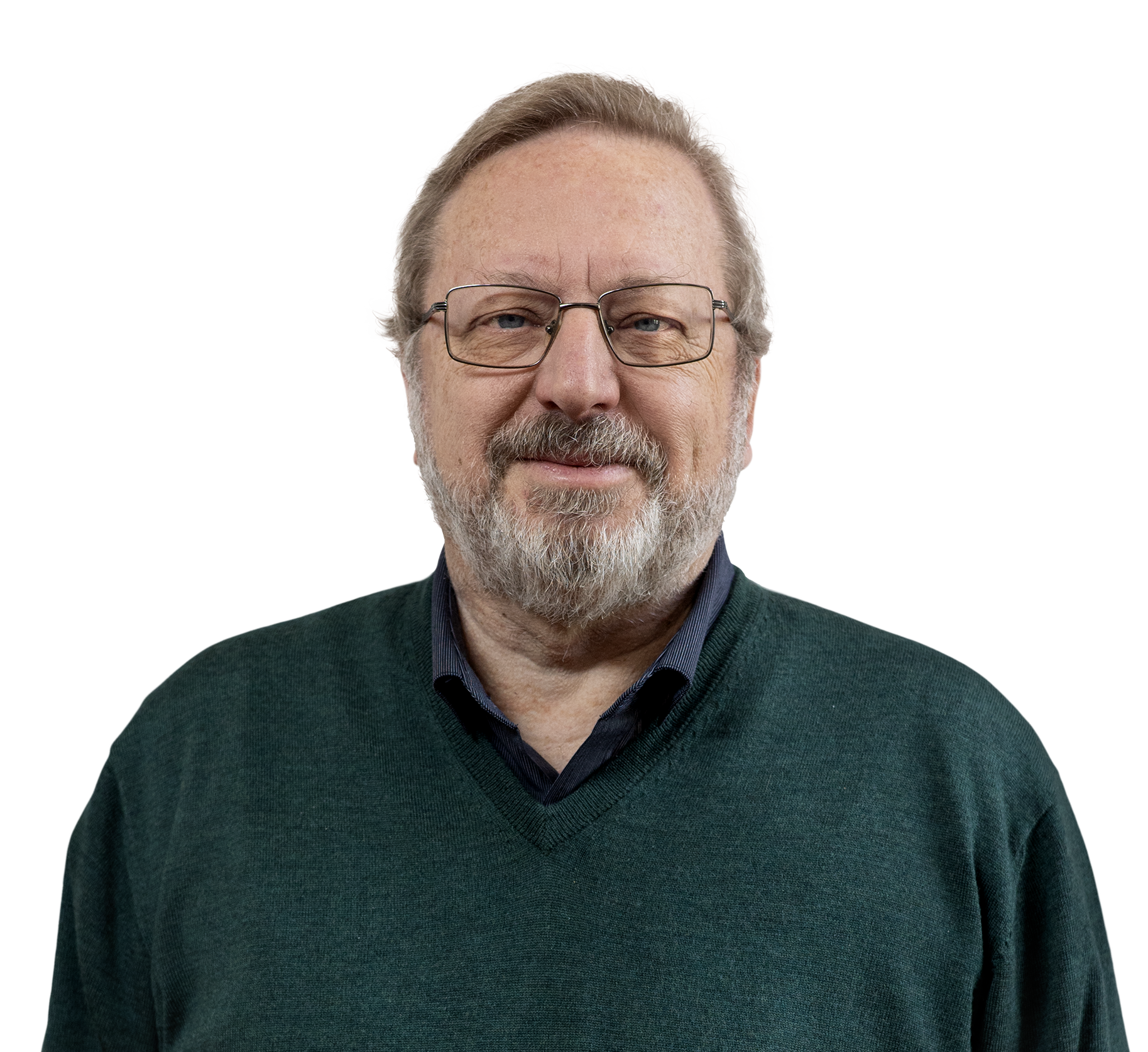
- Fazenda in 2025

Vice President of the Assembly of the Republic
- In office 15 October 2009 – 19 June 2011
- President: Jaime Gama

President of the Left Bloc's Parliamentary group
- In office 20 June 2011 – 6 December 2012
- Preceded by: José Manuel Pureza
- Succeeded by: Pedro Filipe Soares
- In office 26 October 1999 – 15 October 2009
- Preceded by: Office established
- Succeeded by: José Manuel Pureza

Member of the Assembly of the Republic
- In office 26 October 1999 – 23 October 2015
- Constituency: Lisbon

Personal details
- Born: Luís Emídio Lopes Mateus Fazenda; 8 October 1957 (age 68) Lisbon, Portugal
- Party: Left Bloc (since 1999)
- Other political affiliations: Popular Democratic Union (formerly)
- Spouse: Maria do Céu Meneses (m. 1977)
- Children: 2
- Relatives: Ramalho Ortigão (great-great-uncle)
- Occupation: Professor • Politician

Luís Emídio Lopes Mateus Fazenda (born on 8 October 1957) is a Portuguese professor and politician.

== Family ==
He is the son of Emídio Salvador Fazenda (born in Faro on December 19, 1929) and his wife Maria de Lourdes Ortigão Peres Lopes Mateus (born in Faro on July 1, 1931). He is a second-degree great-nephew and second-degree great-great-nephew of Ramalho Ortigão, and brother of Maria da Conceição Lopes Mateus Salvador Fazenda (born in Lisbon on September 4, 1952), who is single and without children.

== Biography ==
He was a Deputy in the Assembly of the Republic for the Left Bloc from 1999 to 2015 and served as Vice-President of the Assembly from 2009 to 2011. He was a candidate for Mayor of Sintra in the 2013 local elections on behalf of the Left Bloc.

He supports the decriminalization of abortion.

== Marriage and Descendants ==
He married Maria do Céu da Cunha Meneses on April 16, 1977. She was born in Lisbon, Santa Maria de Belém, on July 16, 1954, daughter of Alfredo Brasil de Meneses and Júlia de Bettencourt da Cunha. They have a son and a daughter:

- Rui Sérgio Meneses Fazenda (born in Lisbon, Campo Grande, on April 9, 1978)
- Vera Isabel Meneses Fazenda (born in Lisbon, Alcântara, on September 25, 1983)
