= Left Bloc =

Political party in Portugal

Left Bloc Bloco de Esquerda
- Abbreviation: BE
- Coordinator of the Political Commission: José Manuel Pureza
- Secretary of the Organization: Isabel Pires
- Founders: Francisco Louçã; Luís Fazenda; Miguel Portas; Fernando Rosas
- Founded: 28 February 1999
- Merger of: UDP; PSR; Politics XXI
- Headquarters: Rua da Palma, 268; 1100-394 Lisbon
- Newspaper: Esquerda
- Youth wing: Jovens do Bloco
- Membership (2022): c. 10,000
- Ideology: Democratic socialism; Left-wing populism; Anti-capitalism; Soft Euroscepticism
- Political position: Left-wing to far-left
- European affiliation: ELA; NTP
- European Parliament group: The Left in the European Parliament
- International affiliation: Fourth International
- Colours: Red (official); Maroon (customary)
- Assembly of the Republic: 1 / 230
- European Parliament: 1 / 21
- Regional Parliaments: 1 / 104
- Local government (Mayors): 0 / 308
- Local government (Parishes): 0 / 3,216

Election symbol
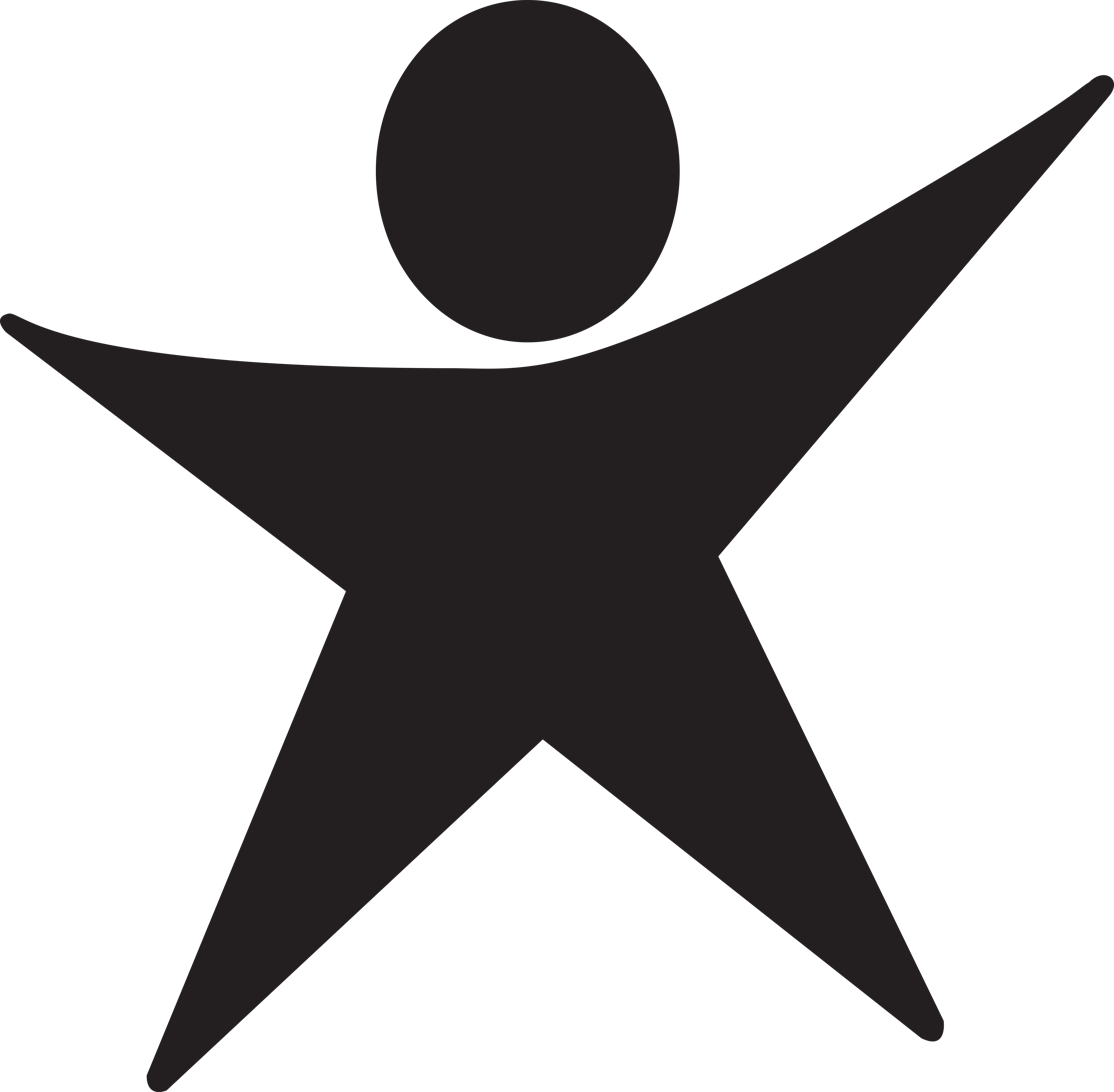

Party flag

Website
- bloco.org

The Left Bloc (Portuguese: Bloco de Esquerda [ˈblɔku ðɨ ɨʃˈkeɾðɐ], BE), colloquially shortened as O Bloco, is a political party in Portugal. A left-wing populist and democratic socialist party, it has been described as left-wing to far-left. It is currently led by José Manuel Pureza.

== History ==
=== Formation and early history ===
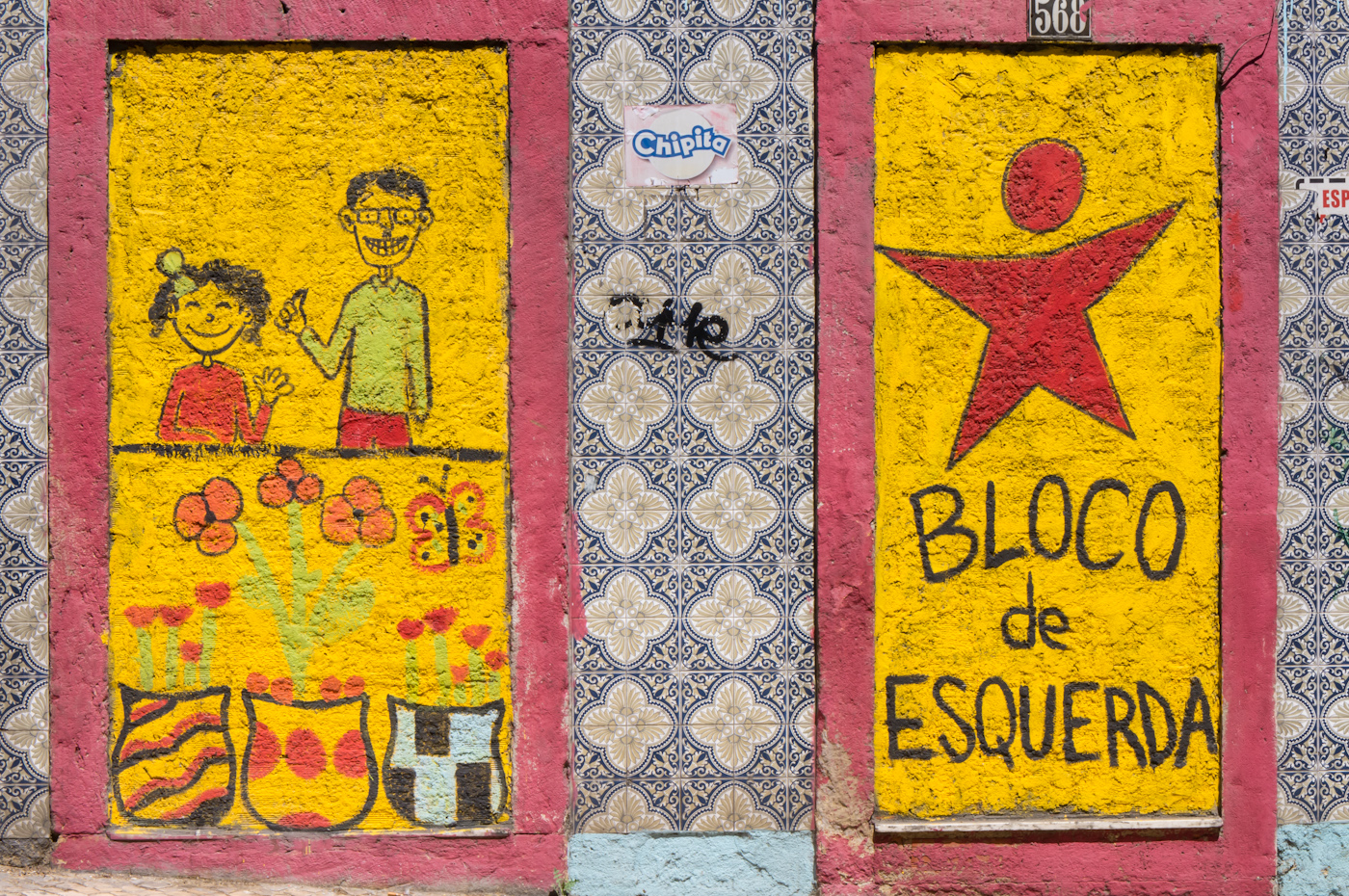
Pro-Left Bloc graffiti on the façade of a vacant house in Rato, Lisbon

The Left Bloc was formed in 1999 by the merger of the Marxist People's Democratic Union, Trotskyist Revolutionary Socialist Party, and the democratic socialist Politics XXI. It has had full party status since its founding, yet the constituent groups have maintained their existence as individual political associations, retaining some levels of autonomy in a loose structure. In the 1999 legislative election the BE polled at 2%. In 2002 this rose to 3%.

=== Louçã's leadership (1999–2012) ===
In the 1999 election BE received 2.4% of the votes leading them to enter the Assembly of the Republic for the first time with 2 MPs for the Lisbon constituency. These representatives were Francisco Louçã and Fernando Rosas. In the 2005 election BE received 6.5% of the votes winning them 8 MPs. In the 2006 presidential elections, the Left Bloc's candidate, Francisco Louçã, received 288,224 votes (5.31%).

In the 2009 European Parliament election they received 10.73% winning them 3 MEPs. They also surpassed the CDU for the first time in an election. At the subsequent 2009 national election, the party obtained 9.81% of votes and 16 members of parliament in the 230-seat Assembly of the Republic.

The financial crisis led socialist prime minister Sócrates to agree to a bailout memorandum with the Eurogroup. In the subsequent 2011 snap election, the country saw a massive shift to the right, with the Left Bloc losing nearly half of its previous popular support, obtaining only 5.17% of the vote and 8 members of parliament. This defeat is generally attributed to the partial support certain sections of the party appeared to offer the unpopular Socialist government while the latter pursued an austerity program in response to the financial crisis.

=== Martins' leadership (2012–2023) ===
The historical merger of ideologies that gave rise to the Portuguese Left Bloc was a process that lasted sixteen years. Its main actors aged and times changed, which led to an awareness of the need for modernization and realism. Francisco Louçã is one of the founders who most insisted on restricting theory to the basic humanistic and ethical principles common to partisans and supporters in order to conquer a wider range of constituencies. The game would necessarily be played in the framework of democracy, active participation and defence of human rights. After thirteen years of intensive labor as a leader, Louçã quit the position of party chairman in 2012 arguing that "it is time for renewal" and delegating his functions to a man and a woman. Catarina Martins, 39 years old, and João Semedo, a veteran, would be elected co-coordinators of the party on 11 November 2012. However, the renewal process would last for over one year.

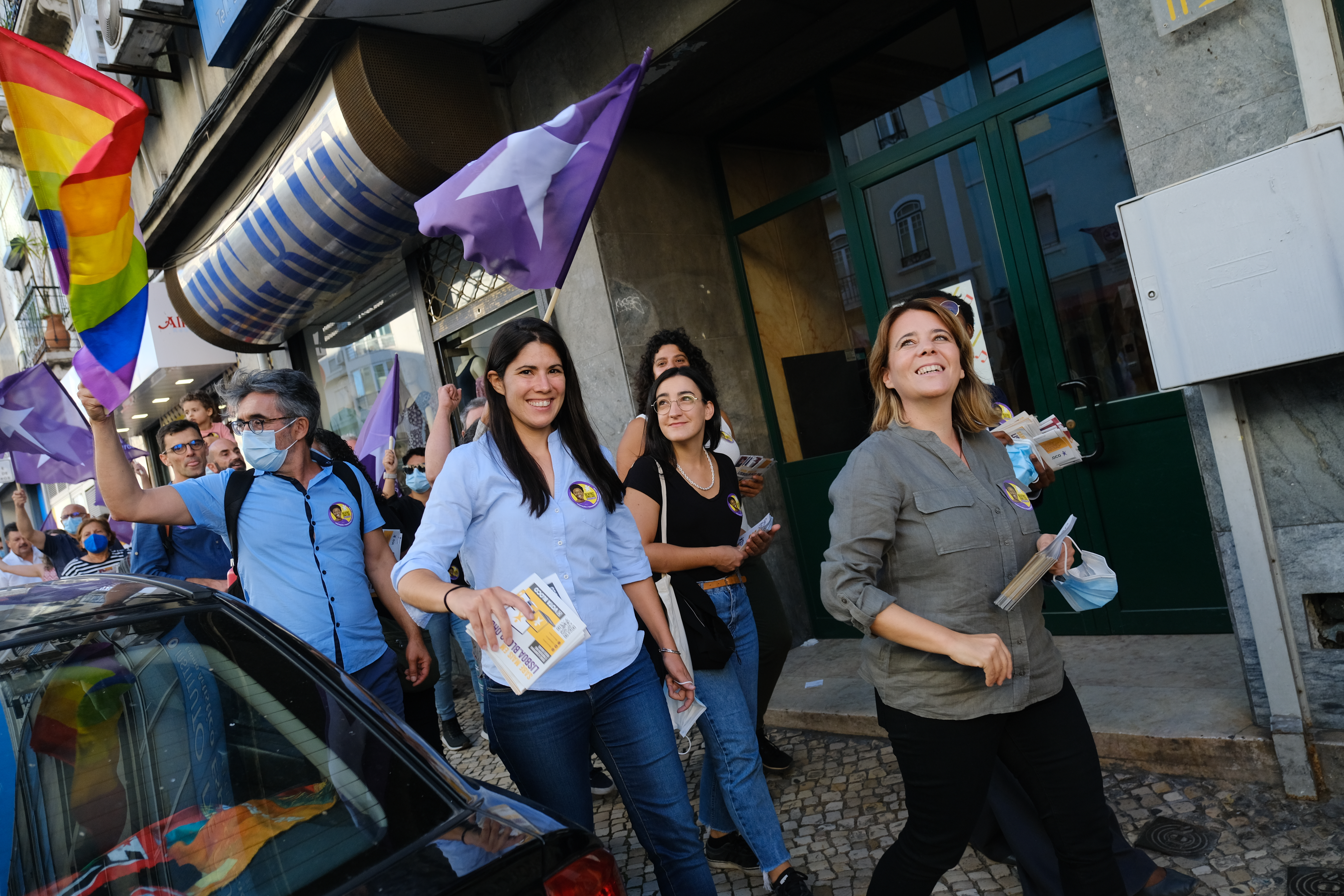
Catarina Martins and Mariana Mortágua during a demonstration in the campaign for the 2021 local elections.

In early 2014, the Left Bloc suffered a split, when elected Left Bloc MEP Rui Tavares, who already in 2011 had become an independent, founded left-ecologist LIVRE party. Left-wing intellectuals who had come together to the Manifesto 3D collective challenged the Left Bloc to converge with LIVRE towards a joined list in the upcoming 2014 European election. Two official meetings in late 2014 and early 2015 however failed with the Left Bloc referring to programmatic differences with Tavares. So while the severe austerity programs under prime minister Passos Coelho did backdrop on the Portuguese political right, the European election in May saw the Socialists and liberal Earth Party as relative winners, whereas the Left Bloc lost more than half of 2009's votes and two of its three mandates. LIVRE received 2.2% but failed to win any mandate.

In the 2015 legislative election, the Left Bloc achieved 10.2% of the votes and elected 19 deputies, their best result in legislative elections ever, in what was considered a major upset. On 10 November 2015, Catarina Martins signed an agreement with the Socialist Party that is aimed at identifying convergence issues, while also recognizing their differences. The Bloc supported the minority Socialist Costa Government (2015–2019) with a confidence and supply agreement. The Socialist Party government would be re-elected in 2019, with the Left Bloc returning to opposition. The party voted against the 2022 budget, triggering an election in January of that year. The Left Bloc would lose 14 seats, reducing them to five, and over half of their popular vote from 2019 — tactical voting for the Socialist Party and the Left Bloc's opposition to the budget were blamed. The Socialist Party would be re-elected with a majority government.

=== Mortágua's leadership (2023–2025) ===
On 14 February 2023, Catarina Martins announced she would leave the Left Bloc's leadership. In the 13th Convention of the Left Bloc, on 27 and 28 May 2023, Mariana Mortágua, one of the party's most well known deputies, was elected as the party coordinator with 83% of the votes.

After the resignation of António Costa, the Left Bloc expected to gain seats and increase their voting share. Despite that, in the 2024 legislative election, the Left Bloc achieved a very similar result, keeping their five seats. Following that poor result, and in light of Luís Montenegro's victory, Mariana Mortágua led negotiations with the remaining parties on the left (PS, PCP, LIVRE and PAN) in order to build an alternative to the incoming right-wing government.

In January 2025, a scandal broke out when it was revealed that, among other party workers laid off after the poor results of the 2022 election, were two breastfeeding mothers, with Mariana Mortágua apologizing for the mistake of the previous leadership. This sparked outrage, with the members of internal opposition, led by Pedro Soares, resigning from the political commission.

In the 2025 legislative election, the Left Bloc took inspiration from the results of Die Linke in that year's German election, nominating the party's founders as heads of lists in strategic constituencies (Francisco Louçã in Braga, Luís Fazenda in Aveiro and Fernando Rosas in Leiria), using canvassing in campaigning for the first time in Portugal and investing in social media during the campaign. Despite that, the party suffered its worst result ever, winning 2% of the popular vote, its lowest ever, and electing only one member to the Assembly. The party lost more than half of its 2024 voters, falling to 125,808 total votes.

Following the election, Mortágua became the single deputy from the party. In September 2025, in the run up to that year's local elections, she took part in the Global Sumud Flotilla, intending to distribute aid to the Gaza Strip, where she was detained by the Israeli government. During this time, she was replaced in parliament by Andreia Galvão. In the 2025 local elections the Left Bloc lost three of its four city councillors, electing a single one in Lisbon under the PS/L/BE/PAN coalition and lost almost all of its local representation, despite the many coalitions made between BE, LIVRE and PAN all across the country.

=== Pureza's leadership (2025–present) ===
On 25 October 2025, following the poor results of the 2025 local elections, Mariana Mortágua announced her intention not to seek reelection as party coordinator. Former Vice President of Parliament José Manuel Pureza announced his candidacy for the party's leadership on 2 November 2025, being elected on 30 November 2025 during the 14th party convention, with more than 81% of the votes. Mortágua was replaced in Parliament by former parliamentary leader Fabian Figueiredo, starting in January 2026.

In the 2026 presidential election, the party presented Catarina Martins as their candidate. Catarina Martins got just 2.1% of the votes, the worst result from any BE presidential candidate, which she attributed to strategic vote on the left for António José Seguro. The party supported Seguro in the second round against far right leader André Ventura.

On 14 July 2026, a group of 60 members, including party founder Mário Tomé, former deputies and autarchs, and past members of the Political Commission, announced their departure from the Left Bloc, declaring in a joint letter that "our Bloco is over". Tomé, a military veteran of the 25 April revolution, had led the People's Democratic Union (UDP), one of the three parties that founded the Left Bloc in 1999. Also among the signatories was former deputy Pedro Soares. Many of those leaving were associated with the Convergência (Convergence) current, formed at the end of 2019 in opposition to the leadership then held by Catarina Martins. In their letter, they accused the party of centralising decision-making within an over-powerful Secretariat and of fostering an anti-democratic internal culture that had sidelined critical or alternative voices. They were particularly critical of the party's role in the Geringonça, the period in which the Left Bloc gave parliamentary support to the Socialist government of António Costa, arguing that the Bloc had come to be seen as "an appendix of the PS" and had suffered a continual loss of elected representatives as a result.

The Left Bloc's Secretariat responded that it regretted the departure but was not surprised, noting that members of the Convergência group had been leaving the party gradually in a process repeatedly announced in the media. The party also pointed to longstanding disagreements with the group, in particular its opposition to the Bloc's stance of solidarity with Ukraine following the 2022 Russian invasion, which the Political Commission had condemned at the time as an imperialist aggression while also criticising the expansion of NATO.

== Ideology ==
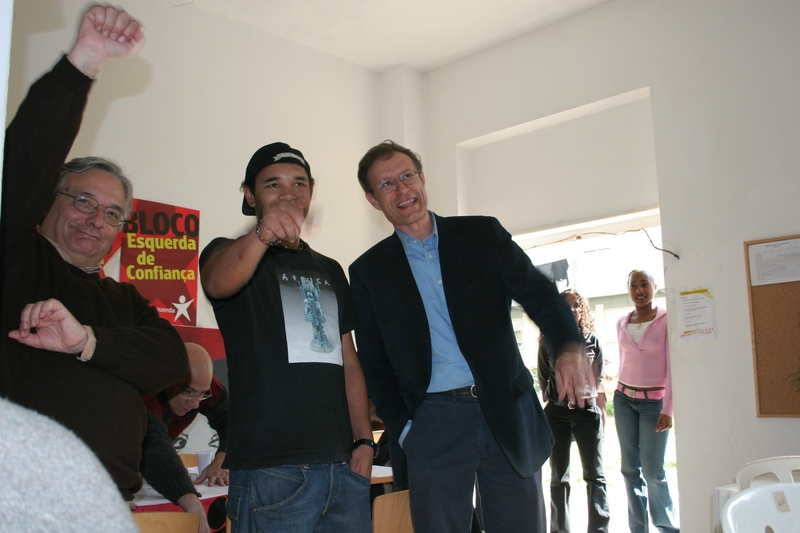
Francisco Louçã and Fernando Rosas during the campaign for the 2005 local elections.

The Left Bloc rose to prominence "following a successful anti-austerity campaign and its backing by a growing popular social movement." It has been described as "Portugal's biggest supporter of feminist, gay rights and anti-racist legislation" and been associated with the New Left. It occupies a flexible and moderate position to the left of the Socialist Party (PS). In comparison to the Portuguese Communist Party, the Left Bloc has been described as "more socially libertarian". The Left Bloc is regarded as a left-libertarian party.

Together with the PS, Left Bloc aims at "building a stable, long-lasting and reliable majority at the Parliament, in order to support the formation and subsequent action of a government committed to the change demanded through the ballot box". This purpose foreshadows changes taking place not only in the Iberian Peninsula but as in all European territory. The party wants a stronger welfare state, rent controls, and to tax the wealthy and big companies. It also wants to use Portugal's budget surplus to increase investment in healthcare and education, lower tax on salaries and energy, and restrict the number of Airbnb's in overburdened areas.

=== Society ===
The Bloc has proposed a number of important laws on civil rights and guarantees, including the protection of citizens from racist, xenophobic, and homophobic discrimination, support for same-sex marriage, laws for the protection of workers and anti-bullfighting legislation. These included Portugal's first law on domestic violence, which was then passed in parliament with the support of the Portuguese Communist Party and the Socialist Party.

The Left Bloc has called for the legalisation of cannabis in Portugal. The party attempted to pass legislation in Parliament regarding cannabis law reform in Portugal in 2013 and 2015, both of which were rejected by the then ruling centre-right coalition government.

All of the Left Bloc's MPs have voted in favour of the legalisation of euthanasia in Portugal.

=== Economy ===
In terms of economics the party advocates "greater state intervention in the economy in order to reduce inequalities", such as rises to the minimum wage. It has also put forward "many legislative proposals defending salaries, pensions and the welfare state". The party has been described as anti-capitalist. In September 2019, the party called for the minimum monthly wage to be raised to €650 for both the public and private sectors in January 2020.

=== International relations and foreign policy ===
It is part of the European Left Alliance for the People and the Planet, a European political party that supports an alternative to capitalism.

The party has close relations with other European left-wing parties, such as Spanish Podemos, French La France Insoumise, Swedish Left Party and German Die Linke.

Left Bloc is regarded as a soft Eurosceptic party. In 2019, the Journal of European Integration scored political parties "from 1 to 7 with 1 being strongly opposed and 7 being strongly in favour" of European Union integration, with Left Bloc scoring 3.8.

== Election results ==
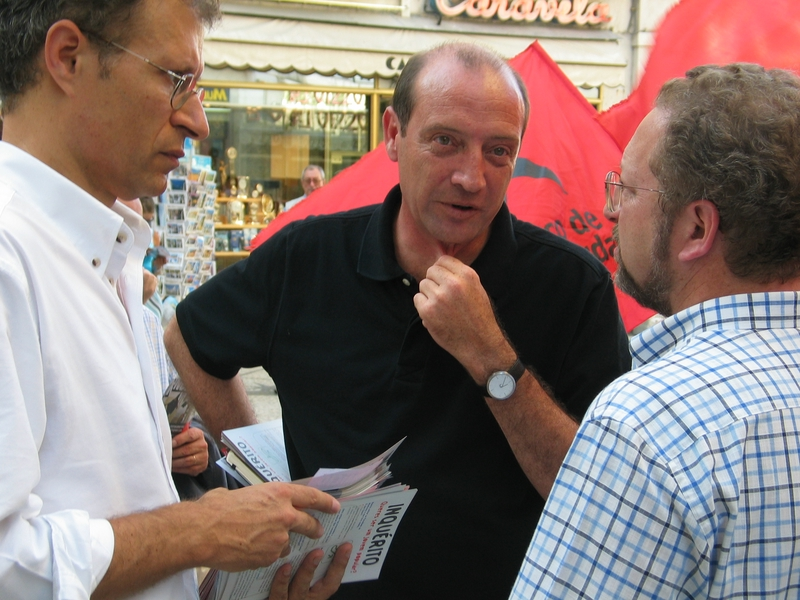
Francisco Louçã, Miguel Portas and Luís Fazenda in campaign for the 2004 European Parliament elections.

=== Assembly of the Republic ===
Vote share in the Portuguese legislative elections

Election	Leader	Votes	%	Seats	+/-	Government
1999	Francisco Louçã	132,333	2.4 (#5)	2 / 230		Opposition
2002	Francisco Louçã	153,877	2.7 (#5)	3 / 230	▲1	Opposition
2005	Francisco Louçã	364,971	6.4 (#5)	8 / 230	▲5	Opposition
2009	Francisco Louçã	557,306	9.8 (#4)	16 / 230	▲8	Opposition
2011	Francisco Louçã	288,923	5.2 (#5)	8 / 230	▼8	Opposition
2015	Catarina Martins	550,945	10.2 (#3)	19 / 230	▲11	Opposition (2015)
2015	Catarina Martins	550,945	10.2 (#3)	19 / 230	▲11	Confidence and supply (2015–2019)
2019	Catarina Martins	498,549	9.5 (#3)	19 / 230	0	Opposition
2022	Catarina Martins	244,603	4.4 (#5)	5 / 230	▼14	Opposition
2024	Mariana Mortágua	282,314	4.4 (#5)	5 / 230	0	Opposition
2025	Mariana Mortágua	125,808	2.0 (#7)	1 / 230	▼4	Opposition

=== Presidential elections ===
Election	Candidate	First round		Second round		Result
Election	Candidate	Votes	%	Votes	%	Result
2001	Fernando Rosas	129,840	3.0 (#4)			Lost ✗
2006	Francisco Louçã	292,198	5.3 (#5)			Lost ✗
2011	Supported Manuel Alegre					Lost ✗
2016	Marisa Matias	469,814	10.1 (#3)			Lost ✗
2021	Marisa Matias	165,127	4.0 (#5)			Lost ✗
2026	Catarina Martins	116,407	2.1 (#6)			Lost ✗

=== European Parliament ===
Election	Leader	Votes	%	Seats	+/–	EP Group
1999	Miguel Portas	61,920	1.8 (#5)	0 / 25		–
2004	Miguel Portas	167,313	4.9 (#4)	1 / 24	▲1	GUE/NGL
2009	Miguel Portas	382,667	10.7 (#3)	3 / 22	▲2	GUE/NGL
2014	Marisa Matias	149,764	4.6 (#5)	1 / 21	▼2	GUE/NGL
2019	Marisa Matias	325,093	9.8 (#3)	2 / 21	▲1	The Left
2024	Catarina Martins	168,107	4.3 (#5)	1 / 21	▼1	The Left

=== Local elections ===
Election	Leader	Votes	%	Mayors	+/-	Councillors	+/-	Assemblies	+/-	Parishes	+/-	Parish Assemblies	+/-
2001	Francisco Louçã	61,789	1.2 (#6)	1 / 308		6 / 2,044		28 / 6,876		6 / 4,252		46 / 34,569	
2005	Francisco Louçã	158,953	3.0 (#5)	1 / 308	0	7 / 2,046	▲1	114 / 6,885	▲86	3 / 4,260	▼3	229 / 34,498	▲183
2009	Francisco Louçã	164,396	3.0 (#6)	1 / 308	0	9 / 2,078	▲2	139 / 6,946	▲25	4 / 4,260	▲1	235 / 34,672	▲6
2013	João Semedo; Catarina Martins	120,982	2.4 (#6)	0 / 308	▼1	8 / 2,086	▼1	100 / 6,487	▼39	0 / 3,085	▼4	138 / 27,167	▼138
2017	Catarina Martins	170,040	3.3 (#5)	0 / 308	0	12 / 2,074	▲4	125 / 6,461	▲25	0 / 3,092	0	213 / 27,019	▲75
2021	Catarina Martins	137,560	2.8 (#6)	0 / 308	0	4 / 2,064	▼8	94 / 6,448	▼31	0 / 3,066	0	162 / 26,797	▼51
2025	Mariana Mortágua	30,629	0.6 (#8)	0 / 308	0	0 / 2,058	▼4	6 / 6,463	▼88	0 / 3,216	0	2 / 27,973	▼160

=== Regional Assemblies ===
Region	Election	Leader	Votes	%	Seats	+/-	Government
Azores	2024	António Lima	2,936	2.5 (#4)	1 / 57	▼1	Opposition
Madeira	2025	Roberto Almada	1,586	1.1 (#9)	0 / 47	0	No seats

Azorean regional elections

Election	Leader	Votes	%	Seats	+/-	Government
2000		1,387	1.4 (#5)	0 / 52		No seats
2004		1,022	1.0 (#5)	0 / 52	0	No seats
2008	Zuraida Soares	2,972	3.3 (#4)	2 / 57	▲2	Opposition
2012	Zuraida Soares	2,428	2.3 (#4)	1 / 57	▼1	Opposition
2016	Zuraida Soares	3,414	3.7 (#4)	2 / 57	▲1	Opposition
2020	António Lima	3,962	3.8 (#5)	2 / 57	0	Opposition
2024	António Lima	2,936	2.5 (#4)	1 / 57	▼1	Opposition

Madeiran regional elections

Election	Leader	Votes	%	Seats	+/-	Government
2004	Paulo Martinho Martins	5,035	3.7 (#5)	1 / 68		Opposition
2007	Paulo Martinho Martins	4,186	3.0 (#5)	1 / 47	0	Opposition
2011	Roberto Almada	2,512	1.7 (#9)	0 / 47	▼1	No seats
2015	Roberto Almada	4,849	3.8 (#6)	2 / 47	▲2	Opposition
2019	Paulino Ascensão	2,489	1.7 (#6)	0 / 47	▼2	No seats
2023	Roberto Almada	3,035	2.2 (#8)	1 / 47	▲1	Opposition
2024	Roberto Almada	1,912	1.4 (#9)	0 / 47	▼1	No seats
2025	Roberto Almada	1,586	1.1 (#9)	0 / 47	0	No seats

== Organization ==
=== Leadership ===
==== Party Coordinators ====
Name		Portrait	Constituency	Tenure			Prime Minister
Name		Portrait	Constituency	Start	End	Duration	Prime Minister
1	Francisco Louçã (b. 1956)		Lisbon (1999–2012); Braga (2025)	24 March 1999	10 November 2012	13 years, 231 days	António Guterres (1995–2002)
1	Francisco Louçã (b. 1956)		Lisbon (1999–2012); Braga (2025)	24 March 1999	10 November 2012	13 years, 231 days	Durão Barroso (2002–2004)
1	Francisco Louçã (b. 1956)		Lisbon (1999–2012); Braga (2025)	24 March 1999	10 November 2012	13 years, 231 days	Santana Lopes (2004–2005)
1	Francisco Louçã (b. 1956)		Lisbon (1999–2012); Braga (2025)	24 March 1999	10 November 2012	13 years, 231 days	José Sócrates (2005–2011)
1	Francisco Louçã (b. 1956)		Lisbon (1999–2012); Braga (2025)	24 March 1999	10 November 2012	13 years, 231 days	Passos Coelho (2011–2015)
2	João Semedo (1951–2018)		Porto	10 November 2012	30 November 2014	2 years, 20 days	Passos Coelho (2011–2015)
2	Catarina Martins (b. 1973)		Porto	10 November 2012	28 May 2023	10 years, 199 days	Passos Coelho (2011–2015)
3	Catarina Martins (b. 1973)		Porto	10 November 2012	28 May 2023	10 years, 199 days	António Costa (2015–2024)
4	Mariana Mortágua (b. 1986)		Lisbon	28 May 2023	30 November 2025	2 years, 186 days	António Costa (2015–2024)
4	Mariana Mortágua (b. 1986)		Lisbon	28 May 2023	30 November 2025	2 years, 186 days	Luís Montenegro (since 2024)
5	José Manuel Pureza (b. 1958)		Coimbra	30 November 2025	Incumbent	355 days	Luís Montenegro (since 2024)

==== Parliamentary leaders ====
- Luís Fazenda (Lisbon): 1999 – 2009
- José Manuel Pureza (Coimbra): 2009 – 2011
- Luís Fazenda (Lisbon): 2011 – 2012
- Pedro Filipe Soares (Aveiro; Lisbon): 2012 – 2024
- Fabian Figueiredo (Lisbon): 2024 – 2025

=== Elected politicians ===
==== Members of the Assembly of the Republic ====
17th Legislature (2025 – present)
- Mariana Mortágua (Lisbon) – until January 2026
  Andreia Galvão – from September 2025 to October 2025
  Fabian Figueiredo – from January 2026
16th Legislature (2024 – 2025)
- Mariana Mortágua (Lisbon)
- Fabian Figueiredo (Lisbon)
- Marisa Matias (Porto)
  Isabel Pires – from April 2024 to May 2024
- José Soeiro (Porto) – until February 2025
  Isabel Pires – from February 2025
- Joana Mortágua (Setúbal)
15th Legislature (2022 – 2024)
- Mariana Mortágua (Lisbon)
- Pedro Filipe Soares (Lisbon)
- Catarina Martins (Porto) – until September 2023
  Isabel Pires – from September 2023
- José Soeiro (Porto)
  Isabel Pires – from February 2023 to August 2023
- Joana Mortágua (Setúbal)
14th Legislature (2019 – 2022)
- Mariana Mortágua (Lisbon)
- Pedro Filipe Soares (Lisbon)
  Fabian Figueiredo – from April 2021 to June 2021
- Beatriz Gomes Dias (Lisbon)
- Jorge Costa (Lisbon)
- Isabel Pires (Lisbon)
- Catarina Martins (Porto)
- José Soeiro (Porto)
- Luís Monteiro (Porto)
- Maria Manuel Rola (Porto)
- José Maria Cardoso (Braga)
- Alexandra Vieira (Braga)
- Joana Mortágua (Setúbal)
- Sandra Cunha (Setúbal) – until April 2021
  Diana Santos – from April 2021
- Moisés Ferreira (Aveiro)
- Nelson Peralta (Aveiro)
- Ricardo Vicente (Leiria)
  Manuel Azenha – from June 2020 to January 2021
- José Manuel Pureza (Coimbra)
- João Vasconcelos (Faro)
- Fabíola Cardoso (Santarém)
13th Legislature (2015 – 2019)
- Mariana Mortágua (Lisbon)
- Pedro Filipe Soares (Lisbon)
- Jorge Costa (Lisbon)
- Isabel Pires (Lisbon)
- Jorge Falcato Simões (Lisbon)
  Maria Luísa Cabral – from June 2016 to January 2018
- Catarina Martins (Porto)
- José Soeiro (Porto)
- Luís Monteiro (Porto)
- Domicília Costa (Porto) – until July 2017
  Maria Manuel Rola – from July 2017
- Jorge Campos (Porto) – until December 2018
  Fernando Manuel Barbosa – from December 2018
- Pedro Soares (Braga)
- Joana Mortágua (Setúbal)
- Sandra Cunha (Setúbal)
- Moisés Ferreira (Aveiro)
- Heitor de Sousa (Leiria)
- José Manuel Pureza (Coimbra)
- João Vasconcelos (Faro)
- Carlos Matias (Santarém)
- Paulino Ascensão (Madeira) – until May 2018
  Ernesto Ferraz – from May 2018
12th Legislature (2011 – 2015)
- Francisco Louçã (Lisbon) – until October 2012
  Helena Pinto – from October 2012
- Ana Drago (Lisbon) – until August 2013
  Rita Calvário– from June 2011 to September 2011
  Mariana Mortágua – from August 2013
- Luís Fazenda (Lisbon)
- João Semedo (Porto) – until March 2015
  José Soeiro – from March 2015
- Catarina Martins (Porto)
- Mariana Aiveca (Setúbal)
- Pedro Filipe Soares (Aveiro)
- Cecília Honório (Faro) – until June 2015
  Eugénia Taveira – from June 2015
11th Legislature (2009 – 2011)
- Francisco Louçã (Lisbon)
- Ana Drago (Lisbon)
- Luís Fazenda (Lisbon)
- Helena Pinto (Lisbon)
- Rita Calvário (Lisbon)
- João Semedo (Porto)
- Catarina Martins (Porto)
- José Soeiro (Porto)
- Pedro Soares (Braga)
- Fernando Rosas (Setúbal) – until October 2010
  Jorge Costa – from October 2010
- Mariana Aiveca (Setúbal)
- Pedro Filipe Soares (Aveiro)
- José Manuel Pureza (Coimbra)
- Heitor de Sousa (Leiria)
- José Gusmão (Santarém)
- Cecília Honório (Faro)
10th Legislature (2005 – 2009)
- Francisco Louçã (Lisbon)
- Luís Fazenda (Lisbon)
- Ana Drago (Lisbon)
  Cecília Honório – from September 2006 to January 2009
- Helena Pinto (Lisbon)
- João Teixeira Lopes (Porto) – until March 2006
  João Semedo – from March 2006
- Alda Macedo (Porto)
  José Soeiro – from December 2007 to June 2008
- Fernando Rosas (Setúbal)
  António Chora – from April 2006 to December 2007
- Mariana Aiveca (Setúbal)
9th Legislature (2002 – 2005)
- Francisco Louçã (Lisbon)
  Joana Amaral Dias – from January 2003 to August 2003
- Luís Fazenda (Lisbon)
  Ana Drago – from September 2002 to January 2003
- João Teixeira Lopes (Porto)
  Alda Sousa – from February 2004 to June 2004
8th Legislature (1999 – 2002)
- Francisco Louçã (Lisbon)
  Helena Neves – from October 2000 to December 2000
  Fernando Rosas – from February 2001 to March 2001
- Luís Fazenda (Lisbon)
  Helena Neves – from December 2000 to February 2001
  Fernando Rosas – from September 2001 to February 2002

==== Members of the European Parliament ====
10th Legislature (2024 – present)
- Catarina Martins
9th Legislature (2019 – 2024)
- Marisa Matias – until March 2024
  Anabela Rodrigues – from March 2024
- José Gusmão
8th Legislature (2014 – 2019)
- Marisa Matias
7th Legislature (2009 – 2014)
- Miguel Portas – until April 2012
  Alda Sousa – from April 2012
- Marisa Matias
- Rui Tavares – became independent in June 2011
6th Legislature (2004 – 2009)
- Miguel Portas

== See also ==
- List of political parties in Portugal
