= Pedro Filipe Soares =

Portuguese mathematician and politician (b. 1979)

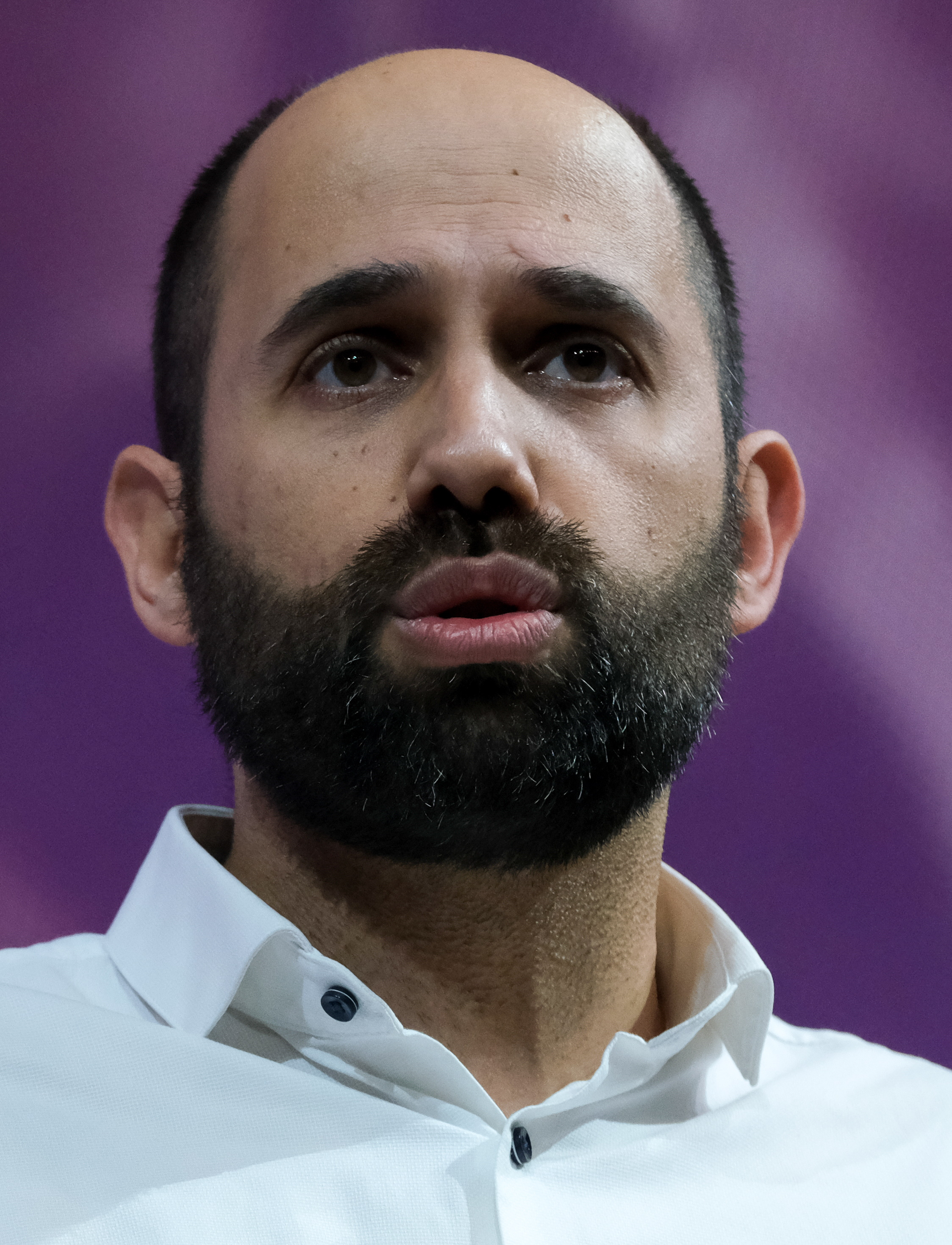
- Pedro Filipe Soares in 2022.

President of the Left Bloc's Parliamentary group
- In office 6 December 2012 – 26 March 2024
- Preceded by: Luís Fazenda
- Succeeded by: Fabian Figueiredo

Member of the Assembly of the Republic
- In office 23 October 2015 – 26 March 2024
- Constituency: Lisbon
- In office 27 September 2009 – 22 October 2015
- Constituency: Aveiro

Personal details
- Born: 15 February 1979 (age 47) Castelo de Paiva, Portugal
- Party: Left Bloc

Pedro Filipe Gomes Soares (born 15 February 1979) is a Portuguese mathematician and politician of the Left Bloc.

Born in Castelo de Paiva, Aveiro District, he graduated in Applied Mathematics from the University of Porto, and has a master's degree in remote sensing. In 2001, aged 22, he ran for a city council seat, and four years later he was second on his party's electoral list in the district for the legislative elections.

In 2009, Soares became the first Left Bloc politician elected to the Assembly of the Republic by Aveiro, and was re-elected in 2011. On 6 December 2012, he was voted the party's parliamentary leader. In the 2015 elections, Soares was elected to the Assembly for a third time, this time by Lisbon.

== Election history ==
=== Castelo de Paiva City Council election, 2001 ===
Ballot: 9 October 2005
Party	Candidate	Votes	%	Seats	+/−
PSD	Paulo Teixeira	6,863	59.4	4	±0
PS	Joaquim Quintas	4,364	37.8	3	±0
CDU	–	79	0.7	0	±0
BE	Pedro Filipe Soares	34	0.3	0	new
Blank/Invalid ballots		211	1.8	–	–
Turnout		7,759	51.84	13	±0
Source: Autárquicas 2001

=== Left Bloc leadership election, 2014 ===
Ballot: 23 November 2014
Candidate	Votes	%
João Semedo; Catarina Martins	266	50.8
Pedro Filipe Soares	258	49.2
Turnout	524	
Source: Results

=== Matosinhos City Council election, 2025 ===
Ballot: 12 October 2025
Party	Candidate	Votes	%	Seats	+/−
PS	Luísa Salgueiro	37,266	44.9	7	–1
PSD/CDS	Bruno Pereira	20,272	24.4	3	+1
CH	António Parada	11,472	13.8	2	+2
IL	Filipe Garcia	3,754	4.5	0	±0
CDU	José Pedro Rodrigues	3,366	4.1	0	–1
LIVRE	Diana Sá	2,070	2.5	0	new
BE	Pedro Filipe Soares	1,282	1.5	0	±0
PAN	Hugo Alexandre Trindade	915	1.1	0	±0
ADN	Vasco Martins	311	0.4	0	new
Blank/Invalid ballots		2,345	2.8	–	–
Turnout		83,053	55.45	11	±0
Source: Autárquicas 2025
