= Pedro Soares (politician) =

Portuguese politician

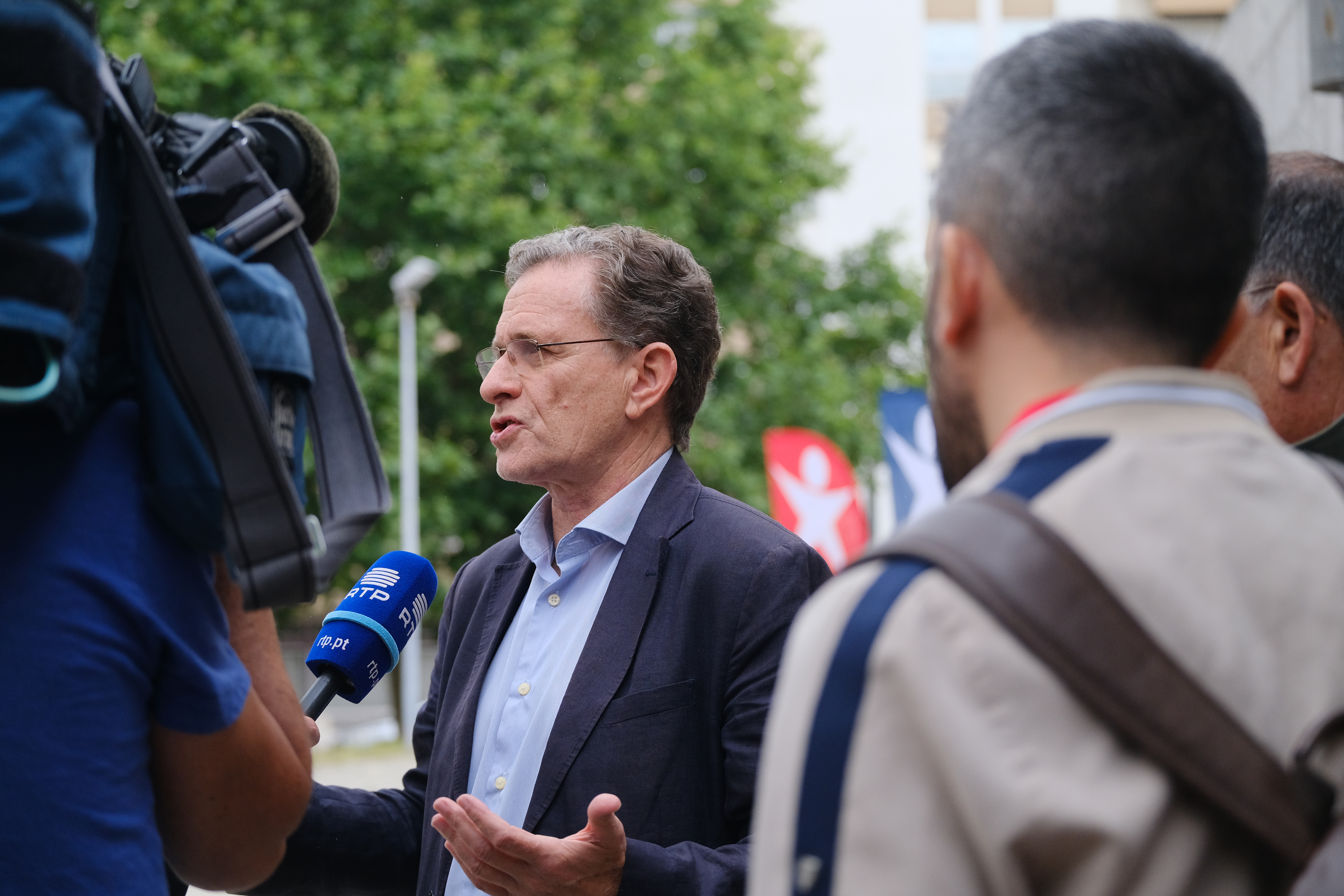
- Soares in 2023

Member of the Assembly of the Republic
- In office 23 October 2015 – 24 October 2019
- Constituency: Braga
- In office 15 October 2009 – 19 June 2011
- Constituency: Braga

Personal details
- Born: Pedro Manuel Bastos Rodrigues Soares; 6 March 1957 (age 69) Peso da Régua, Portugal
- Party: Left Bloc (1999–2026)
- Other political affiliations: Popular Democratic Union (until 1999)
- Occupation: Politician, university professor

Pedro Manuel Bastos Rodrigues Soares (born 6 March 1957) is a Portuguese politician who served as a member of the Assembly of the Republic for Braga from 2009 to 2011 and from 2015 to 2019.

Soares was a member of the direction of the Popular Democratic Union at the time of the founding of the Left Bloc in 1999. For several years he led Motion E, the main internal opposition within the Left Bloc against Mariana Mortágua's leadership.

On 14 July 2026, Soares was among a group of 60 members, including the founding veteran Mário Tomé, who announced their resignation from the Left Bloc. In a critical manifesto, the signatories blamed the party leadership for alienating its grassroots base and for the party's political decline, declaring that "our Left Bloc is over".
