= José Soeiro =

Portuguese sociologist and politician

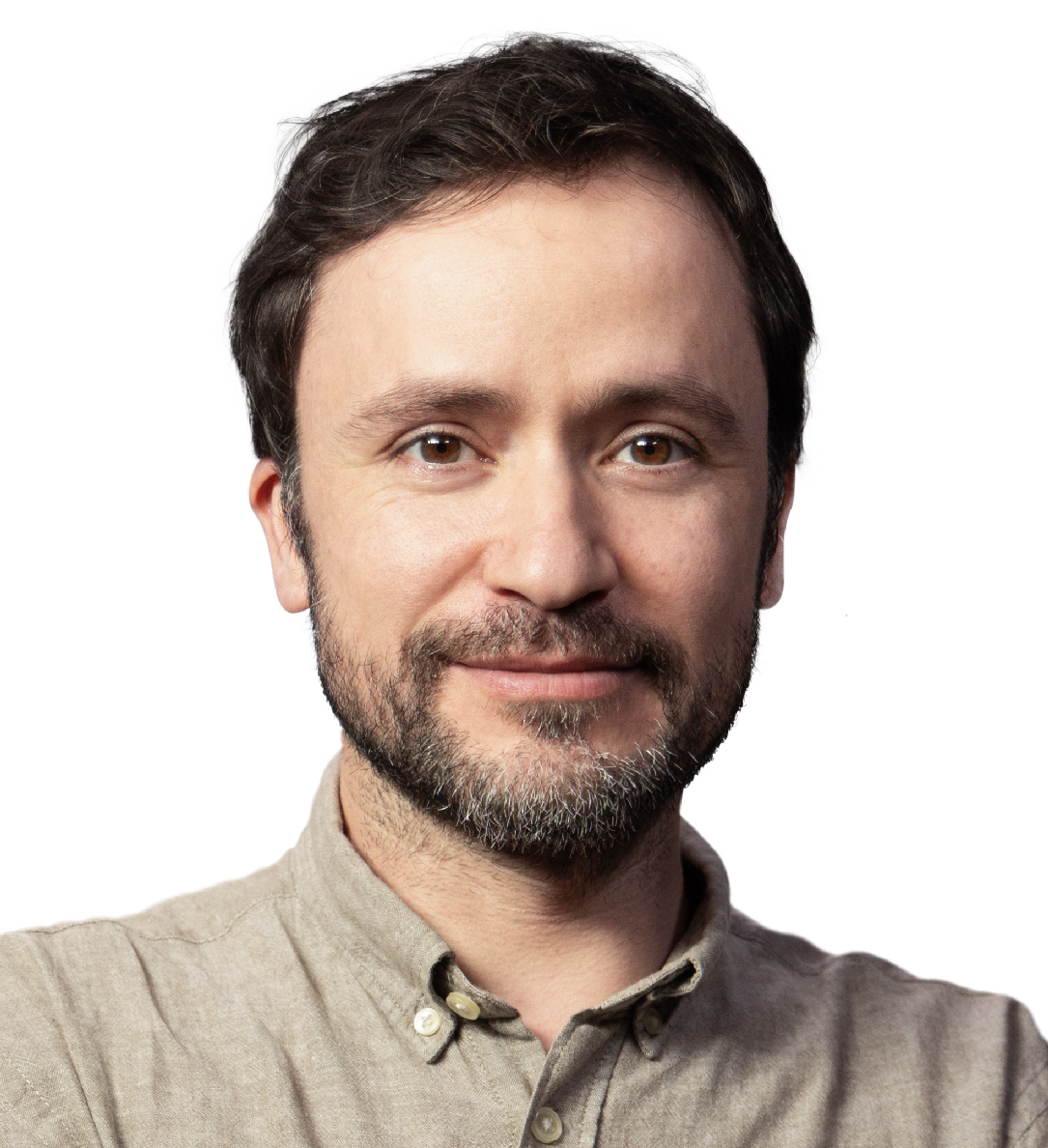
- José Soeiro in 2024.

Member of the Assembly of the Republic
- In office 10 March 2008 – February 2025
- Constituency: Porto

Personal details
- Born: José Borges de Araújo de Moura Soeiro; 11 August 1984 (age 42) Porto, Porto District, Portugal
- Party: Left Bloc
- Education: University of Porto
- Occupation: Politician
- Profession: Sociologist

José Borges de Araújo de Moura Soeiro (born 11 August 1984) is a Portuguese sociologist and politician, and a former member of the Assembly of the Republic, where he represented the Left Bloc. He acted as an MP from 2008 to 2025. He obtained his doctorate in Sociology from the University of Porto.

== Works ==
- CARDINA, Miguel e SOEIRO, José (2013), "Esquerda Radical", in João Cardoso Rosas e Ana Rita Ferreira (orgs.), Ideologias Políticas Contemporâneas – Mudanças e Permanências, Coimbra: Almedina.
- SOEIRO, José; CARDINA, Miguel; SERRA, Nuno (coord.) (2013), Não Acredite em Tudo o que Pensa. Mitos do Senso Comum na Era da Austeridade. Lisboa, Tinta-da-China.
