= Ana Drago =

Portuguese sociologist and politician

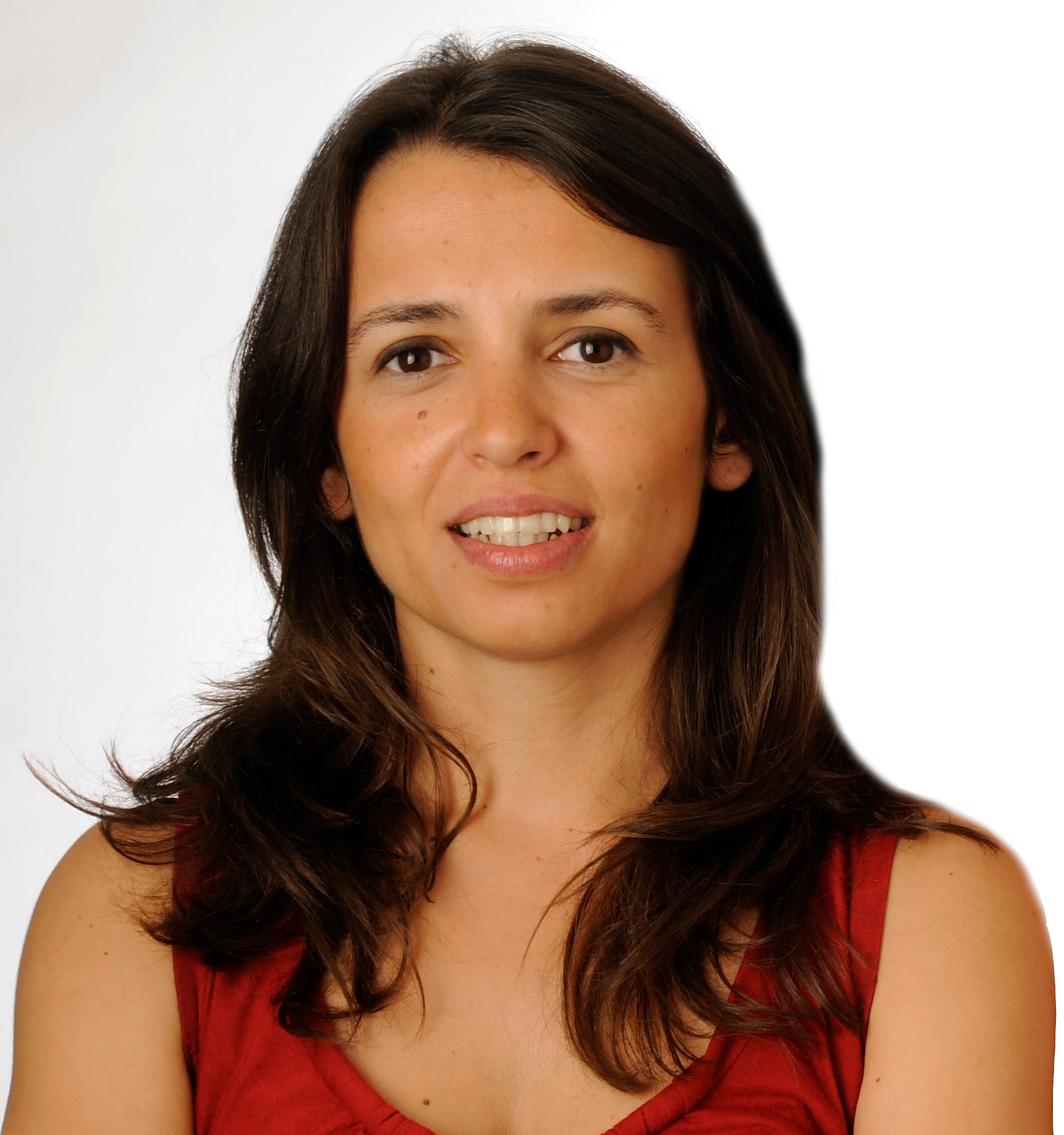

Personal details
- Born: Ana Isabel Drago Lobato; 28 August 1975 (age 50) Lisbon, Portugal
- Party: Left Bloc
- Occupation: Politician, Tv commentator

Ana Isabel Drago Lobato (born 28 August 1975, in Lisbon) is a Portuguese sociologist and a ex-politician of the Left Bloc party.

== Biography ==
She graduated from the School of Economics of University of Coimbra (FEUC) with a degree in sociology. As a student, she collaborated on several associative activities of the Coimbra Academic Association, where she was journalist of University Journal "A Cabra" and of Coimbra University Radio. Was co-author of the television show "Conversa Privada" with Daniel Sampaio. She was Member in the Assembly of the Republic of Portugal in IX and X Legislatures, elected by the Left Bloc. In 2012, during Legislature XI, she plays the positions of Deputy, Member of the National Bureau of the Left Bloc and Member of the Political Commission of the Left Bloc.

== Published works ==
- "Agitar Antes de Ousar: O Movimento Estudantil Anti-Propinas", 2003, Edições Afrontamento, Porto
