= João Semedo =

Portuguese physician and politician (1951–2018)

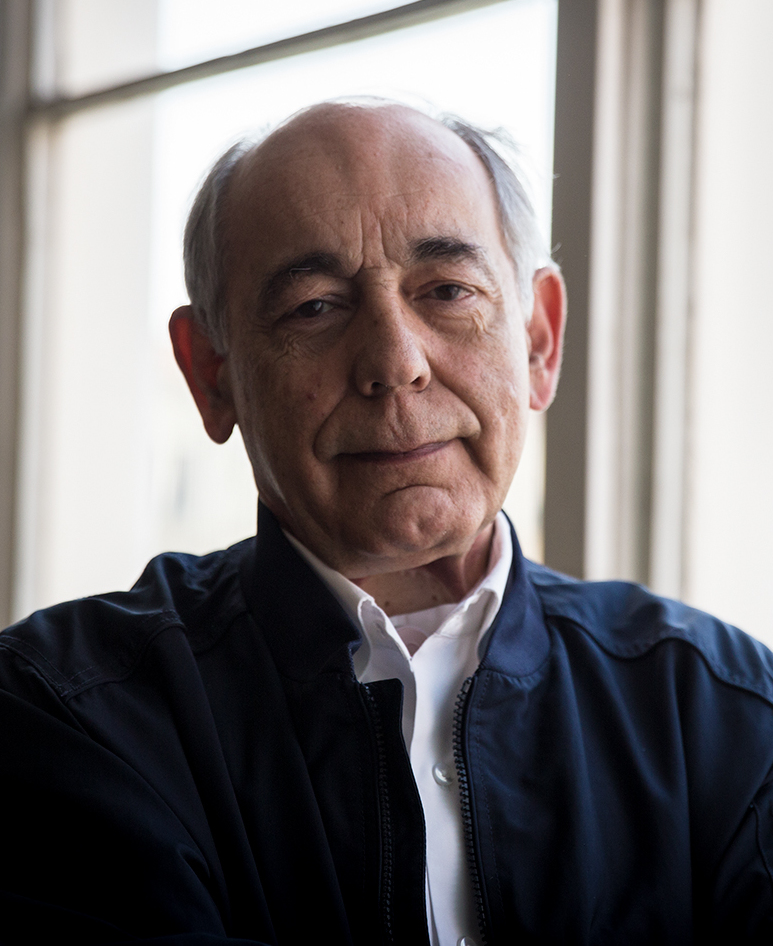

Member of Assembly of the Republic
- In office 8 March 2006 – 13 March 2015

Co-coordinator of Bloco de Esquerda
- In office 11 November 2012 – 30 November 2014 Serving with Catarina Martins
- Preceded by: Francisco Louçã
- Succeeded by: Catarina Martins (alone)

Personal details
- Born: 20 June 1951 Lisbon, Portugal
- Died: 17 July 2018 (aged 67) Lisbon, Portugal
- Party: Left Bloc (2007–2018)
- Other political affiliations: Portuguese Communist Party (1972–2000)
- Education: University of Lisbon
- Occupation: Pulmonologist and Politician

João Pedro Furtado da Cunha Semedo (20 June 1951 – 17 July 2018) was a Portuguese physician and politician.

== Biography ==
Born in Lisbon in 1951, he attended Camões Secondary School and graduated from the Faculty of Medicine of the University of Lisbon in 1975. Between 1972 and 1974, he was a member of the board of the Association of Students of that college. In 1975, he participated in the creation and promotion of the Movement ALFA (for adult literacy), and was part of its leadership. He completed his internship in the former Civil Hospitals of Lisbon, now the Hospital Central Lisbon Center, and then joined the national movement of internal physicians.

He moved to Porto in 1978, where he practiced medicine and pursued political, social and cultural activities. He participated in founding the Union of Doctors of the North and the Popular University of Porto, and was part of the leadership of FITEI and the artistic cooperative Tree. He worked in several public, private and social health services, completed a postdoctoral degree in Drug Addiction at the Faculty of Psychology of Porto, and worked in Associação Norte Vida with the homeless population. In the 1990s he founded and directed a private clinic and directed the medical services of an IPSS (Private Institution of Social Solidarity). Between 2000 and 2006, he was chairman of the Board of Administration of the Joaquim Urbano Hospital, a unit of the National Health Service (SNS) specialized in respiratory and infectious diseases. In 2006, he left the hospital administration to serve as a Member of the Assembly of the Republic on an exclusive basis.

He joined the Union of Communist Students (UEC) and, consequently, the Portuguese Communist Party (PCP) in 1972. In 1973, he was detained by the political police of the Estado Novo dictatorial regime, PIDE/DGS, accused of subversive activities. He served on the Central Commission of the UEC and the Central Committee of the PCP. He resigned from the PCP Central Committee in 1991 and from the party in 2000. In 2003 he participated in the creation of the Communist Renewal Movement. In 2004, as an independent member, he joined the list of the Left Bloc (BE) to the European Parliament and in 2005, he was a candidate for the same party to the Assembly of the Republic, which he would repeat in 2009 and 2011 as head of the list by the circle of Porto. He was a national deputy between 2006 and 2015, resigning halfway through his last term because of illness. He was the BE candidate for the municipal councils of Gondomar, in 2005, of Gaia, in 2009 and of Lisbon, in 2013, but was never the most voted.

He died on 17 July 2018.
