= Francisco Louçã =

Portuguese economist and politician (born 1956)

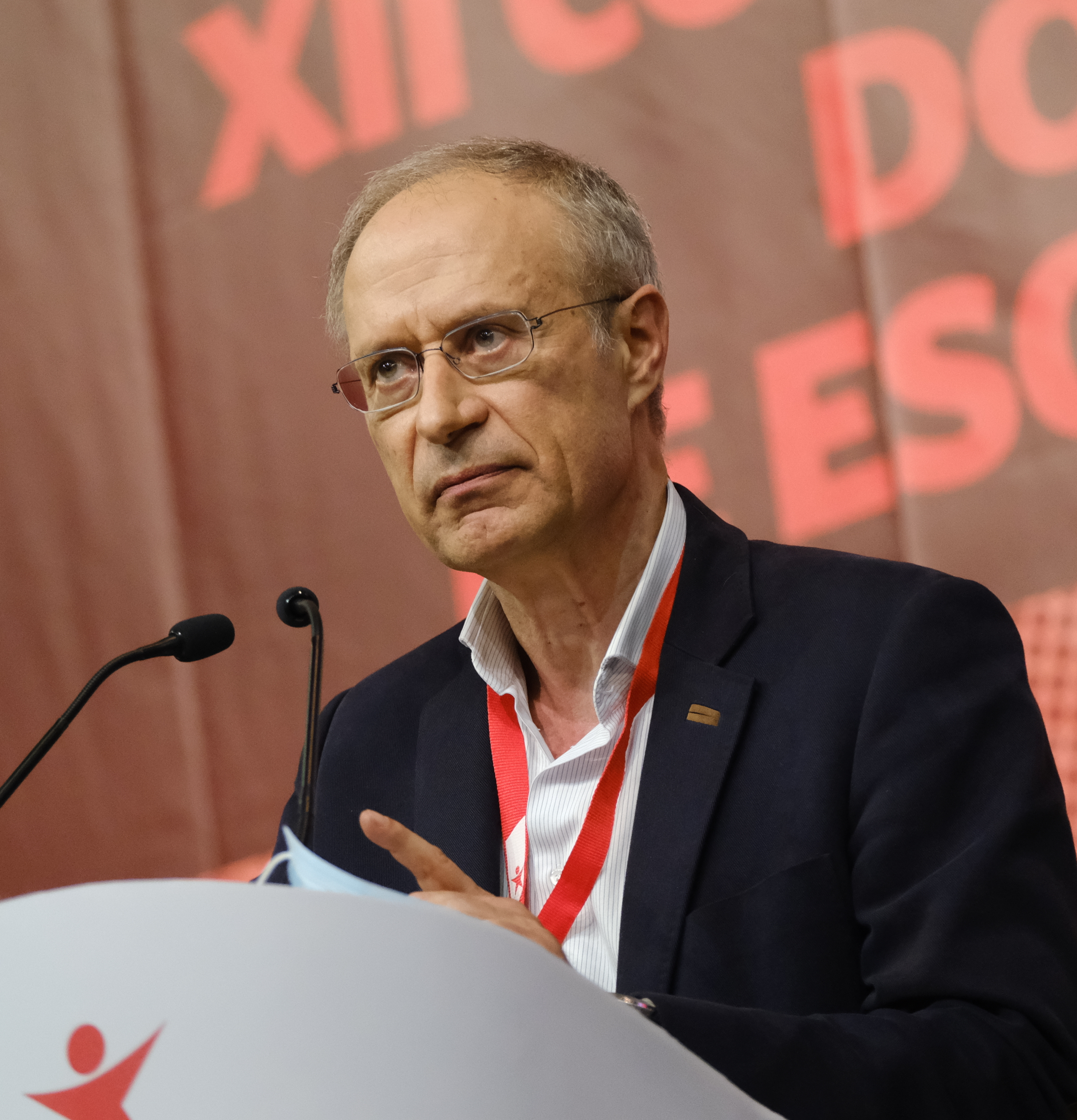
- Louçã in 2021

Member of the Council of State
- In office 12 January 2016 – 29 April 2022
- Appointed by: Assembly of the Republic
- President: Aníbal Cavaco Silva; Marcelo Rebelo de Sousa

Coordinator of the Left Bloc
- In office 24 March 1999 – 10 November 2012
- Preceded by: Position established
- Succeeded by: Catarina Martins; João Semedo

Member of the Assembly of the Republic
- In office 25 October 1999 – 25 October 2012
- Constituency: Lisbon

Personal details
- Born: Francisco Anacleto Louçã; 12 November 1956 (age 69) Lisbon, Portugal
- Party: Left Bloc (1999–present)
- Other political affiliations: Internationalist Communist League (1973–1978); Revolutionary Socialist Party (1978–1999)
- Children: 1
- Relatives: Vítor Gaspar (cousin)
- Education: Technical University of Lisbon
- Profession: Economist, professor

Francisco Anacleto Louçã (Portuguese pronunciation: [fɾɐ̃ˈsiʃku loˈsɐ̃]; born 12 November 1956) is a Portuguese economist and politician.

== Biography ==
He is the second son of António Seixas Louçã, a Portuguese Navy Officer, and his wife Noémia da Rocha Neves Anacleto, lawyer, granddaughter of António Neves Anacleto, from Silves, brother of Isabel Maria, António, João Carlos and Jorge Manuel, and cousin of Vítor Gaspar, former Minister of Finances at the right winged Pedro Passos Coelho's government.

Louçã was an active opponent of the pre-democracy regime. He was arrested for a protest against the colonial war in 1972, before the fall of the dictatorship, which lasted in Portugal for about forty years and finished with the Carnation Revolution, (25 April 1974). In 1999, after pursuing his academic career, he helped found the left-wing party Left Bloc (Portuguese: Bloco de Esquerda).

== Career ==
He is a Full Professor of Economics in Lisbon's Instituto Superior de Economia e Gestão (Direct Translation - "Higher Institute of Economics and Management", officially in English - "Lisbon School of Economics and Management"), which belongs to the University of Lisbon (formerly Technical University of Lisbon) and was a member of the Portuguese Parliament from 1999 to 2012.

He is the author of several books and scientific articles on the history of economic thought, the dynamics of complex adaptive systems and the nature of long-term techno-economic change, including "Turbulence in Economics" (Elgar, 1997), "As Time Goes By" (with Christopher Freeman, Oxford University Press, 2011 and 2002, translated into Portuguese, Chinese), "The Years of High Econometrics" (Routledge, 2007) and a number of papers in scientific journals in economics, mathematical physics, history of economic ideas, mathematical modeling of financial markets, history of biology. His scientific books are translated into eleven languages. In 1999 he was awarded the prize for the best scientific paper of the year, "History of Economics Association".

A candidate in the 2006 Portuguese presidential election, Louçã received 288,224 votes (5.31%).

Francisco Louçã is one of the five personalities elected by the Assembly of the Republic to the Council of State on 18 December 2015, and he took office on 12 January 2016, serving until 2022. He is also the first (and so far only) member of Left Bloc to accede to this body.

== Electoral history ==
=== Legislative election, 1991 ===
Ballot: 6 October 1991
Party	Candidate	Votes	%	Seats	+/−
PSD	Aníbal Cavaco Silva	2,902,351	50.6	135	–13
PS	Jorge Sampaio	1,670,758	29.1	72	+12
CDU	Álvaro Cunhal	504,583	8.8	17	–14
CDS	Diogo Freitas do Amaral	254,317	4.4	5	+1
PSN	Manuel Sérgio	96,096	1.6	1	new
PSR	Francisco Louçã	64,159	1.1	0	±0
Other parties		132,495	2.3	0	–7
Blank/Invalid ballots		110,672	1.9	–	–
Turnout		5,735,431	67.78	230	–20
Source: Comissão Nacional de Eleições

=== Lisbon City Council election, 1997 ===
Ballot: 14 December 1997
Party	Candidate	Votes	%	Seats	+/−
PS/CDU/UDP	João Soares	165,072	51.9	10	–1
PSD/CDS–PP	Ferreira do Amaral	124,866	39.3	7	+1
PSR/PXXI	Francisco Louçã	8,315	2.6	0	new
PCTP/MRPP	–	6,070	1.9	0	±0
Blank/Invalid ballots		13,799	4.3	–	–
Turnout		318,102	48.29	17	±0
Source: Autárquicas 1997

=== Legislative election, 1999 ===
Ballot: 10 October 1999
Party	Candidate	Votes	%	Seats	+/−
PS	António Guterres	2,385,922	44.1	115	+3
PSD	José Manuel Durão Barroso	1,750,158	32.3	81	–7
CDU	Carlos Carvalhas	487,058	9.0	17	+2
CDS–PP	Paulo Portas	451,643	8.3	15	±0
BE	Francisco Louçã	132,333	2.4	2	new
Other parties		99,842	1.8	0	±0
Blank/Invalid ballots		108,194	2.0	–	–
Turnout		5,415,102	61.02	230	±0
Source: Comissão Nacional de Eleições

=== Legislative election, 2002 ===
Ballot: 17 March 2002
Party	Candidate	Votes	%	Seats	+/−
PSD	José Manuel Durão Barroso	2,200,765	40.2	105	+24
PS	Eduardo Ferro Rodrigues	2,068,584	37.8	96	–19
CDS–PP	Paulo Portas	477,350	8.7	14	–1
CDU	Carlos Carvalhas	379,870	6.9	12	–5
BE	Francisco Louçã	153,877	2.8	3	+1
Other parties		88,542	1.6	0	±0
Blank/Invalid ballots		107,774	2.0	–	–
Turnout		5,473,655	61.48	230	±0
Source: Comissão Nacional de Eleições

=== Legislative election, 2005 ===
Ballot: 20 February 2005
Party	Candidate	Votes	%	Seats	+/−
PS	José Sócrates	2,588,312	45.0	121	+25
PSD	Pedro Santana Lopes	1,653,425	28.8	75	–30
CDU	Jerónimo de Sousa	433,369	7.5	14	+2
CDS–PP	Paulo Portas	416,415	7.3	12	–2
BE	Francisco Louçã	364,971	6.4	8	+5
Other parties		122,127	2.1	0	±0
Blank/Invalid ballots		169,052	2.9	–	–
Turnout		5,747,834	64.26	230	±0
Source: Comissão Nacional de Eleições

=== Presidential election, 2006 ===
Ballot: 22 January 2006
Candidate	Votes	%
Aníbal Cavaco Silva	2,773,431	50.5
Manuel Alegre	1,138,297	20.7
Mário Soares	785,355	14.3
Jerónimo de Sousa	474,083	8.6
Francisco Louçã	292,198	5.3
Garcia Pereira	23,983	0.4
Blank/Invalid ballots	102,785	–
Turnout	5,590,132	61.53
Source: Comissão Nacional de Eleições

=== Legislative election, 2009 ===
Ballot: 27 September 2009
Party	Candidate	Votes	%	Seats	+/−
PS	José Sócrates	2,077,238	36.6	97	–24
PSD	Manuela Ferreira Leite	1,653,665	29.1	81	+6
CDS–PP	Paulo Portas	592,778	10.4	21	+9
BE	Francisco Louçã	557,306	9.8	16	+8
CDU	Jerónimo de Sousa	446,279	7.9	15	+1
Other parties		178,012	3.1	0	±0
Blank/Invalid ballots		175,980	3.1	–	–
Turnout		5,681,258	59.68	230	±0
Source: Comissão Nacional de Eleições

=== Legislative election, 2011 ===
Ballot: 5 June 2011
Party	Candidate	Votes	%	Seats	+/−
PSD	Pedro Passos Coelho	2,159,181	38.7	108	+27
PS	José Sócrates	1,566,347	28.0	74	–23
CDS–PP	Paulo Portas	653,888	11.7	24	+3
CDU	Jerónimo de Sousa	441,147	7.9	16	+1
BE	Francisco Louçã	288,923	5.2	8	–8
PCTP/MRPP	Garcia Pereira	62,610	1.1	0	±0
PAN	Paulo Borges	57,995	1.0	0	new
Other parties		126,521	2.3	0	±0
Blank/Invalid ballots		228,017	4.1	–	–
Turnout		5,585,054	58.03	230	±0
Source: Comissão Nacional de Eleições
