= Setúbal (Assembly of the Republic constituency) =

Constituency of the Assembly of the Republic, the national legislature of Portugal

- Constituency for the Assembly of the Republic
- Location of Setúbal within Portugal
- District: Setúbal
- Population: 916,859 (2024)
- Electorate: 754,726 (2025)
- Area: 5,214 km^{2} (2024)

Current Constituency
- Created: 1976
- Seats: List: 19 (2024–present); 18 (2015–2024); 17 (1995–2015); 16 (1991–1995); 17 (1976–1991)
- Deputies: List: Margarida Afonso (PS); André Pinotes Batista (PS); Patrícia Carvalho (CH); Joana Cordeiro (IL); Paulo Edson Cunha (PSD); Cláudia Estêvão (CH); Nuno Gabriel (CH); Rita Matias (CH); António Mendes (PS); Teresa Morais (PSD); Paulo Muacho (L); Carlos João Pereira (PS); Eurídice Pereira (PS); Ricardo Reis (CH); Sonia dos Reis (PSD); Pedro Roque (PSD); Paula Santos (PCP); Daniel Teixeira (CH); Bruno Vitorino (PSD)

Setúbal is one of the 22 multi-member constituencies of the Assembly of the Republic, the national legislature of Portugal. The constituency was established in 1976 when the Assembly of the Republic was established by the constitution following the restoration of democracy. It is conterminous with the district of Setúbal. The constituency currently elects 19 of the 230 members of the Assembly of the Republic using the closed party-list proportional representation electoral system. At the 2025 legislative election it had 754,726 registered electors.

== Electoral system ==
Setúbal currently elects 19 of the 230 members of the Assembly of the Republic using the closed party-list proportional representation electoral system. Seats are allocated using the D'Hondt method.

== Election results ==
=== Summary ===
Election	Unitary Democrats CDU / APU / PCP			Left Bloc BE / UDP			LIVRE L			Socialists PS / FRS			People Animals Nature PAN			Democratic Renewal PRD			Social Democrats PSD / PàF / AD / PPD			Liberals IL			CDS – People's CDS–PP / CDS			Chega CH / PPV/CDC / PPV		
Election	Votes	%	Seats	Votes	%	Seats	Votes	%	Seats	Votes	%	Seats	Votes	%	Seats	Votes	%	Seats	Votes	%	Seats	Votes	%	Seats	Votes	%	Seats	Votes	%	Seats
2025	34,914	7.26%	1	13,072	2.72%	0	28,622	5.95%	1	122,858	25.54%	5	9,223	1.92%	0				103,213	21.46%	5	27,074	5.63%	1				129,763	26.98%	6
2024	38,848	7.91%	1	30,165	6.14%	1	21,553	4.39%	1	157,200	31.99%	7	12,865	2.62%	0				86,320	17.57%	4	26,952	5.48%	1				102,120	20.78%	4
2022	43,553	10.24%	2	24,940	5.86%	1	6,140	1.44%	0	198,126	46.57%	10	8,641	2.03%	0				69,967	16.44%	3	22,225	5.22%	1	4,863	1.14%	0	39,171	9.21%	1
2019	62,370	16.38%	3	47,795	12.55%	2	4,873	1.28%	0	152,451	40.03%	9	17,518	4.60%	1				56,842	14.92%	3	4,090	1.07%	0	11,698	3.07%	0	7,646	2.01%	0
2015	79,511	19.38%	4	55,372	13.50%	2	4,263	1.04%	0	145,607	35.49%	7	8,170	1.99%	0				95,670	23.32%	5									
2011	82,159	20.41%	4	29,667	7.37%	1				112,764	28.01%	5	6,282	1.56%	0				105,583	26.23%	5				50,861	12.63%	2	1,191	0.30%	0
2009	84,183	20.73%	4	58,833	14.49%	2				142,727	35.14%	7							68,731	16.92%	3				38,358	9.44%	1	730	0.18%	0
2005	85,452	20.53%	3	43,862	10.54%	2				186,365	44.78%	8							68,695	16.51%	3				21,683	5.21%	1			
2002	80,759	20.90%	4	18,213	4.71%	0				154,794	40.06%	7							97,465	25.22%	5				27,216	7.04%	1			
1999	96,709	25.29%	5	13,806	3.61%	0				170,685	44.64%	8							70,347	18.40%	3				21,983	5.75%	1			
1995	102,911	24.18%	4	3,832	0.90%	0				194,313	45.66%	9							79,645	18.72%	3				31,261	7.35%	1			
1991	100,784	25.41%	5							114,867	28.96%	5				3,772	0.95%	0	140,281	35.37%	6				10,903	2.75%	0			
1987	129,037	33.35%	7	5,858	1.51%	0				69,408	17.94%	3				34,109	8.82%	1	128,402	33.18%	6				7,401	1.91%	0			
1985	160,702	38.92%	7	8,182	1.98%	0				69,585	16.85%	3				85,902	20.80%	4	64,674	15.66%	3				16,140	3.91%	0			
1983	183,372	46.81%	8	6,959	1.78%	0				122,531	31.28%	6							50,657	12.93%	2				20,578	5.25%	1			
1980	179,030	44.79%	9	11,453	2.87%	0				95,841	23.98%	4							97,930	24.50%	4									
1979	189,593	47.96%	9	15,995	4.05%	0				86,192	21.80%	4							89,978	22.76%	4									
1976	159,087	45.95%	9	10,057	2.90%	0				115,352	33.32%	7							30,142	8.71%	1				15,724	4.54%	0			

(Figures in italics represent alliances.)

=== Detailed ===
==== 2020s ====
===== 2025 =====
Results of the 2025 legislative election held on 18 May 2025:

Party		Votes	%	Seats
Chega	CH	129,763	26.98%	6
Socialist Party	PS	122,858	25.54%	5
Democratic Alliance	AD	103,213	21.46%	5
Unitary Democratic Coalition	CDU	34,914	7.26%	1
LIVRE	L	28,622	5.95%	1
Liberal Initiative	IL	27,074	5.63%	1
Left Bloc	BE	13,072	2.72%	0
People Animals Nature	PAN	9,223	1.92%	0
National Democratic Alternative	ADN	4,185	0.87%	0
Portuguese Workers' Communist Party	PCTP	2,993	0.62%	0
Volt Portugal	Volt	887	0.18%	0
Liberal Social Party	PLS	847	0.18%	0
React, Include, Recycle	RIR	749	0.16%	0
Ergue-te	E	713	0.15%	0
New Right	ND	682	0.14%	0
Together for the People	JPP	452	0.09%	0
We, the Citizens!	NC	389	0.08%	0
People's Monarchist Party	PPM	320	0.07%	0
Valid votes		480,956	100.00%	19
Blank votes		6,118	1.24%	
Rejected votes – other		4,345	0.88%	
Total polled		491,419	65.11%	
Registered electors		754,726		

The following candidates were elected:: Margarida Afonso (PS); André Pinotes Batista (PS); Patrícia Carvalho (CH); Joana Cordeiro (IL); Cláudia Estêvão (CH); Nuno Gabriel (CH); Rita Matias (CH); António Mendes (PS); Teresa Morais (AD); Paulo Muacho (L); Carlos João Pereira (PS); Eurídice Pereira (PS); Ricardo Reis (CH); Sonia dos Reis (AD); Paulo Simões Ribeiro (AD); Pedro Roque (AD); Paula Santos (CDU); Daniel Teixeira (CH); and Bruno Vitorino (AD).

===== 2024 =====
Results of the 2024 legislative election held on 10 March 2024:

Party		Votes	%	Seats
Socialist Party	PS	157,200	31.99%	7
Chega	CH	102,120	20.78%	4
Democratic Alliance	AD	86,320	17.57%	4
Unitary Democratic Coalition	CDU	38,848	7.91%	1
Left Bloc	BE	30,165	6.14%	1
Liberal Initiative	IL	26,952	5.48%	1
LIVRE	L	21,553	4.39%	1
People Animals Nature	PAN	12,865	2.62%	0
National Democratic Alternative	ADN	7,668	1.56%	0
Portuguese Workers' Communist Party	PCTP	2,364	0.48%	0
React, Include, Recycle	RIR	1,323	0.27%	0
New Right	ND	1,239	0.25%	0
Volt Portugal	Volt	965	0.20%	0
Ergue-te	E	560	0.11%	0
Alternative 21 (Earth Party and Alliance)	PT-A	438	0.09%	0
Together for the People	JPP	430	0.09%	0
Portuguese Labour Party	PTP	393	0.08%	0
Valid votes		491,403	100.00%	19
Blank votes		6,253	1.24%	
Rejected votes – other		4,945	0.98%	
Total polled		502,601	67.09%	
Registered electors		749,090		

The following candidates were elected: André Pinotes Batista (PS); Clarisse Campos (PS); Patrícia Carvalho (CH); Joana Cordeiro (IL); Nuno Gabriel (CH); Rita Matias (CH); Miguel Matos (PS); Ana Catarina Mendonça Mendes (PS); António Mendes (PS); Teresa Morais (AD); Joana Mortágua (BE); Paulo Muacho (L); Eurídice Pereira (PS); João Paulo Rebelo (PS); Sonia dos Reis (AD); Paulo Simões Ribeiro (AD); Paula Santos (CDU); Daniel Teixeira (CH); and Bruno Vitorino (AD).

===== 2022 =====
Results of the 2022 legislative election held on 30 January 2022:

Party		Votes	%	Seats
Socialist Party	PS	198,126	46.57%	10
Social Democratic Party	PSD	69,967	16.44%	3
Unitary Democratic Coalition	CDU	43,553	10.24%	2
Chega	CH	39,171	9.21%	1
Left Bloc	BE	24,940	5.86%	1
Liberal Initiative	IL	22,225	5.22%	1
People Animals Nature	PAN	8,641	2.03%	0
LIVRE	L	6,140	1.44%	0
CDS – People's Party	CDS–PP	4,863	1.14%	0
Portuguese Workers' Communist Party	PCTP	2,525	0.59%	0
React, Include, Recycle	RIR	1,430	0.34%	0
National Democratic Alternative	ADN	1,310	0.31%	0
Volt Portugal	Volt	515	0.12%	0
Earth Party	PT	493	0.12%	0
Socialist Alternative Movement	MAS	462	0.11%	0
We, the Citizens!	NC	375	0.09%	0
Ergue-te	E	319	0.07%	0
Portuguese Labour Party	PTP	208	0.05%	0
Together for the People	JPP	203	0.05%	0
Valid votes		425,466	100.00%	18
Blank votes		4,415	1.02%	
Rejected votes – other		3,379	0.78%	
Total polled		433,260	58.11%	
Registered electors		745,594		

The following candidates were elected: André Pinotes Batista (PS); Clarisse Campos (PS); Nuno Carvalho (PSD); Joana Cordeiro (IL); João Gomes Cravinho (PS); Bruno Dias (CDU); Ivan Gonçalves (PS); Fernando José (PS); Ana Catarina Mendonça Mendes (PS); António Mendes (PS); Joana Mortágua (BE); Fernando Negrão (PSD); Bruno Nunes (CH); Eurídice Pereira (PS); Jorge Seguro Sanches (PS); Maria Antónia Almeida Santos (PS); Paula Santos (CDU); and Fernanda Velez (PSD).

==== 2010s ====
===== 2019 =====
Results of the 2019 legislative election held on 6 October 2019:

Party		Votes	%	Seats
Socialist Party	PS	152,451	40.03%	9
Unitary Democratic Coalition	CDU	62,370	16.38%	3
Social Democratic Party	PSD	56,842	14.92%	3
Left Bloc	BE	47,795	12.55%	2
People Animals Nature	PAN	17,518	4.60%	1
CDS – People's Party	CDS–PP	11,698	3.07%	0
Chega	CH	7,646	2.01%	0
LIVRE	L	4,873	1.28%	0
Liberal Initiative	IL	4,090	1.07%	0
Portuguese Workers' Communist Party	PCTP	3,523	0.92%	0
Alliance	A	2,892	0.76%	0
React, Include, Recycle	RIR	2,106	0.55%	0
National Renewal Party	PNR	1,754	0.46%	0
Earth Party	PT	1,099	0.29%	0
We, the Citizens!	NC	1,059	0.28%	0
United Party of Retirees and Pensioners	PURP	1,032	0.27%	0
People's Monarchist Party	PPM	743	0.20%	0
Democratic Republican Party	PDR	690	0.18%	0
Portuguese Labour Party	PTP	429	0.11%	0
Socialist Alternative Movement	MAS	274	0.07%	0
Valid votes		380,884	100.00%	18
Blank votes		8,184	2.07%	
Rejected votes – other		6,031	1.53%	
Total polled		395,099	53.64%	
Registered electors		736,583		

The following candidates were elected: André Pinotes Batista (PS); Eduardo Cabrita (PS); Nuno Carvalho (PSD); Sandra Cunha (BE); Ricardo Mourinho Félix (PS); José Luís Ferreira (CDU); João Galamba (PS); Francisco Lopes (CDU); Catarina Marcelino (PS); Ana Catarina Mendonça Mendes (PS); Joana Mortágua (BE); Fernando Negrão (PSD); Filipe Pacheco (PS); Eurídice Pereira (PS); Cristina Rodrigues (PAN); Maria Antónia Almeida Santos (PS); Paula Santos (CDU); and Fernanda Velez (PSD).

===== 2015 =====
Results of the 2015 legislative election held on 4 October 2015:

Party		Votes	%	Seats
Socialist Party	PS	145,607	35.49%	7
Portugal Ahead	PàF	95,670	23.32%	5
Unitary Democratic Coalition	CDU	79,511	19.38%	4
Left Bloc	BE	55,372	13.50%	2
People Animals Nature	PAN	8,170	1.99%	0
Portuguese Workers' Communist Party	PCTP	6,729	1.64%	0
LIVRE	L	4,263	1.04%	0
Democratic Republican Party	PDR	4,142	1.01%	0
National Renewal Party	PNR	2,681	0.65%	0
ACT! (Portuguese Labour Party and Socialist Alternative Movement)	AGIR	1,801	0.44%	0
United Party of Retirees and Pensioners	PURP	1,610	0.39%	0
The Earth Party Movement	MPT	1,592	0.39%	0
We, the Citizens!	NC	1,574	0.38%	0
People's Monarchist Party	PPM	1,024	0.25%	0
Together for the People	JPP	559	0.14%	0
Valid votes		410,305	100.00%	18
Blank votes		7,239	1.71%	
Rejected votes – other		6,145	1.45%	
Total polled		423,689	58.38%	
Registered electors		725,753		

The following candidates were elected: Maria Luís Albuquerque (PàF); Heloísa Apolónia (CDU); Maria das Mercês Borges (PàF); Eduardo Cabrita (PS); Sandra Cunha (BE); Bruno Dias (CDU); Ricardo Mourinho Félix (PS); Francisco Lopes (CDU); Nuno Magalhães (PàF); Catarina Marcelino (PS); Inês de Medeiros (PS); Ana Catarina Mendonça Mendes (PS); Joana Mortágua (BE); Eurídice Pereira (PS); Paulo Trigo Pereira (PS); Pedro do ó Ramos (PàF); Paula Santos (CDU); and Bruno Vitorino (PàF).

===== 2011 =====
Results of the 2011 legislative election held on 5 June 2011:

Party		Votes	%	Seats
Socialist Party	PS	112,764	28.01%	5
Social Democratic Party	PSD	105,583	26.23%	5
Unitary Democratic Coalition	CDU	82,159	20.41%	4
CDS – People's Party	CDS–PP	50,861	12.63%	2
Left Bloc	BE	29,667	7.37%	1
Party for Animals and Nature	PAN	6,282	1.56%	0
Portuguese Workers' Communist Party	PCTP	6,043	1.50%	0
Hope for Portugal Movement	MEP	1,799	0.45%	0
The Earth Party Movement	MPT	1,682	0.42%	0
National Renewal Party	PNR	1,595	0.40%	0
Pro-Life Party	PPV	1,191	0.30%	0
Portuguese Labour Party	PTP	1,133	0.28%	0
People's Monarchist Party	PPM	847	0.21%	0
New Democracy Party	ND	661	0.16%	0
Workers' Party of Socialist Unity	POUS	308	0.08%	0
Valid votes		402,575	100.00%	17
Blank votes		10,866	2.59%	
Rejected votes – other		5,688	1.36%	
Total polled		419,129	58.86%	
Registered electors		712,135		

The following candidates were elected: Mariana Aiveca (BE); Maria Luís Albuquerque (PSD); Heloísa Apolónia (CDU); Maria das Mercês Borges (PSD); Eduardo Cabrita (PS); Duarte Cordeiro (PS); Bruno Dias (CDU); Francisco Lopes (CDU); Nuno Magalhães (CDS-PP); Ana Catarina Mendonça Mendes (PS); Eurídice Pereira (PS); Pedro do ó Ramos (PSD); Paulo Simões Ribeiro (PSD); Paula Santos (CDU); Vieira da Silva (PS); João Paulo Viegas (CDS-PP); and Bruno Vitorino (PSD).

==== 2000s ====
===== 2009 =====
Results of the 2009 legislative election held on 27 September 2009:

Party		Votes	%	Seats
Socialist Party	PS	142,727	35.14%	7
Unitary Democratic Coalition	CDU	84,183	20.73%	4
Social Democratic Party	PSD	68,731	16.92%	3
Left Bloc	BE	58,833	14.49%	2
CDS – People's Party	CDS–PP	38,358	9.44%	1
Portuguese Workers' Communist Party	PCTP	5,574	1.37%	0
Hope for Portugal Movement	MEP	1,710	0.42%	0
People's Monarchist Party	PPM	1,238	0.30%	0
Merit and Society Movement	MMS	1,158	0.29%	0
New Democracy Party	ND	1,089	0.27%	0
The Earth Party Movement and Humanist Party	MPT-PH	917	0.23%	0
Pro-Life Party	PPV	730	0.18%	0
Portuguese Labour Party	PTP	600	0.15%	0
Workers' Party of Socialist Unity	POUS	313	0.08%	0
Valid votes		406,161	100.00%	17
Blank votes		7,313	1.74%	
Rejected votes – other		6,032	1.44%	
Total polled		419,506	59.28%	
Registered electors		707,628		

The following candidates were elected: Mariana Aiveca (BE); Heloísa Apolónia (CDU); Maria das Mercês Borges (PSD); Eduardo Cabrita (PS); Osvaldo de Castro (PS); Bruno Dias (CDU); Francisco Lopes (CDU); Catarina Marcelino (PS); Nuno Magalhães (CDS-PP); Pedro Marques (PS); Ana Catarina Mendonça Mendes (PS); Fernando Negrão (PSD); Eurídice Pereira (PS); Luís Rodrigues (PSD); Fernando Rosas (BE); Paula Santos (CDU); and Vieira da Silva (PS).

===== 2005 =====
Results of the 2005 legislative election held on 20 February 2005:

Party		Votes	%	Seats
Socialist Party	PS	186,365	44.78%	8
Unitary Democratic Coalition	CDU	85,452	20.53%	3
Social Democratic Party	PSD	68,695	16.51%	3
Left Bloc	BE	43,862	10.54%	2
CDS – People's Party	CDS–PP	21,683	5.21%	1
Portuguese Workers' Communist Party	PCTP	5,356	1.29%	0
New Democracy Party	ND	2,109	0.51%	0
Humanist Party	PH	1,152	0.28%	0
National Renewal Party	PNR	906	0.22%	0
Workers' Party of Socialist Unity	POUS	571	0.14%	0
Valid votes		416,151	100.00%	17
Blank votes		7,200	1.69%	
Rejected votes – other		3,812	0.89%	
Total polled		427,163	64.11%	
Registered electors		666,307		

The following candidates were elected: Mariana Aiveca (BE); Alberto Antunes (PS); Heloísa Apolónia (CDU); Eduardo Cabrita (PS); Alberto Arons de Carvalho (PS); Marisa Costa (PS); Joel Hasse Ferreira (PS); Francisco Lopes (CDU); Nuno Magalhães (CDS-PP); Luís Carloto Marques (PSD); Fernando Negrão (PSD); Vitor Ramalho (PS); Luís Rodrigues (PSD); Fernando Rosas (BE); Odete Santos (CDU); Teresa Moraes Sarmento (PS); and António Vitorino (PS).

===== 2002 =====
Results of the 2002 legislative election held on 17 March 2002:

Party		Votes	%	Seats
Socialist Party	PS	154,794	40.06%	7
Social Democratic Party	PSD	97,465	25.22%	5
Unitary Democratic Coalition	CDU	80,759	20.90%	4
CDS – People's Party	CDS–PP	27,216	7.04%	1
Left Bloc	BE	18,213	4.71%	0
Portuguese Workers' Communist Party	PCTP	4,324	1.12%	0
The Earth Party Movement	MPT	1,436	0.37%	0
Humanist Party	PH	791	0.20%	0
National Renewal Party	PNR	723	0.19%	0
Workers' Party of Socialist Unity	POUS	709	0.18%	0
Valid votes		386,430	100.00%	17
Blank votes		4,536	1.15%	
Rejected votes – other		3,228	0.82%	
Total polled		394,194	60.08%	
Registered electors		656,079		

The following candidates were elected: Alberto Antunes (PS); Heloísa Apolónia (CDU); Eduardo Cabrita (PS); Clara Carneiro (PSD); Aires de Carvalho (PS); Narana Coissoró (CDS-PP); Bruno Dias (CDU); Joel Hasse Ferreira (PS); Miguel Frasquilho (PSD); Paulo Pedroso (PS); Vitor Ramalho (PS); Luís Rodrigues (PSD); Pedro Roque (PSD); Maria Amélia Santos (PS); Odete Santos (CDU); Jerónimo de Sousa (CDU); and Bruno Vitorino (PSD).

==== 1990s ====
===== 1999 =====
Results of the 1999 legislative election held on 10 October 1999:

Party		Votes	%	Seats
Socialist Party	PS	170,685	44.64%	8
Unitary Democratic Coalition	CDU	96,709	25.29%	5
Social Democratic Party	PSD	70,347	18.40%	3
CDS – People's Party	CDS–PP	21,983	5.75%	1
Left Bloc	BE	13,806	3.61%	0
Portuguese Workers' Communist Party	PCTP	4,142	1.08%	0
People's Monarchist Party	PPM	1,782	0.47%	0
The Earth Party Movement	MPT	1,714	0.45%	0
National Solidarity Party	PSN	796	0.21%	0
Workers' Party of Socialist Unity	POUS	387	0.10%	0
Valid votes		382,351	100.00%	17
Blank votes		4,756	1.22%	
Rejected votes – other		3,298	0.84%	
Total polled		390,405	60.67%	
Registered electors		643,453		

The following candidates were elected: Alberto Antunes (PS); Maria Amélia Antunes (PS); Heloísa Apolónia (CDU); Manuela Arcanjo (PS); Mata Cáceres (PS); António Capucho (PSD); Jorge Coelho (PS); Rosado Fernandes (CDS-PP); Lucília Ferra (PSD); Joel Hasse Ferreira (PS); Joaquim Matias (CDU); Vicente Merendas (CDU); Paulo Pedroso (PS); Eduardo Pereira (PS); Odete Santos (CDU); Octávio Teixeira (CDU); and Bruno Vitorino (PSD).

===== 1995 =====
Results of the 1995 legislative election held on 1 October 1995:

Party		Votes	%	Seats
Socialist Party	PS	194,313	45.66%	9
Unitary Democratic Coalition	CDU	102,911	24.18%	4
Social Democratic Party	PSD	79,645	18.72%	3
CDS – People's Party	CDS–PP	31,261	7.35%	1
Portuguese Workers' Communist Party	PCTP	7,181	1.69%	0
Popular Democratic Union	UDP	3,832	0.90%	0
Revolutionary Socialist Party	PSR	2,650	0.62%	0
People's Monarchist Party and The Earth Party Movement	PPM-MPT	1,666	0.39%	0
People's Party	PG	1,010	0.24%	0
National Solidarity Party	PSN	659	0.15%	0
Unity Movement for Workers	MUT	396	0.09%	0
Valid votes		425,524	100.00%	17
Blank votes		3,636	0.84%	
Rejected votes – other		3,795	0.88%	
Total polled		432,955	68.03%	
Registered electors		636,420		

The following candidates were elected: Nuno Abecasis (CDS-PP); Heloísa Apolónia (CDU); Rogério Brito (CDU); Mata Cáceres (PS); Aires de Carvalho (PS); Fernanda Costa (PS); Cardoso Ferreira (PSD); Joel Hasse Ferreira (PS); José Vera Jardim (PS); Eduardo Pereira (PS); Carlos Pimenta (PSD); Pedro Pinto (PSD); José Reis (PS); Garcia dos Santos (PS); Odete Santos (CDU); Octávio Teixeira (CDU); and António Vitorino (PS).

===== 1991 =====
Results of the 1991 legislative election held on 6 October 1991:

Party		Votes	%	Seats
Social Democratic Party	PSD	140,281	35.37%	6
Socialist Party	PS	114,867	28.96%	5
Unitary Democratic Coalition	CDU	100,784	25.41%	5
Social Democratic Centre Party	CDS	10,903	2.75%	0
National Solidarity Party	PSN	9,594	2.42%	0
Revolutionary Socialist Party	PSR	7,406	1.87%	0
Portuguese Workers' Communist Party	PCTP	6,368	1.61%	0
Democratic Renewal Party	PRD	3,772	0.95%	0
People's Monarchist Party	PPM	1,724	0.43%	0
Left Revolutionary Front	FER	951	0.24%	0
Valid votes		396,650	100.00%	16
Blank votes		4,432	1.09%	
Rejected votes – other		3,699	0.91%	
Total polled		404,781	67.96%	
Registered electors		595,638		

The following candidates were elected: António Alves (PSD); Ana Maria Bettencourt (PS); Rogério Brito (CDU); Mata Cáceres (PS); Torres Couto (PS); Cardoso Ferreira (PSD); Joel Hasse Ferreira (PS); Eduardo Gomes (PSD); José Manuel Maia (CDU); André Martins (CDU); Eduardo Pereira (PS); Margarida Silva Pereira (PSD); Carlos Pimenta (PSD); Couto dos Santos (PSD); Odete Santos (CDU); and Octávio Teixeira (CDU).

==== 1980s ====
===== 1987 =====
Results of the 1987 legislative election held on 19 July 1987:

Party		Votes	%	Seats
Unitary Democratic Coalition	CDU	129,037	33.35%	7
Social Democratic Party	PSD	128,402	33.18%	6
Socialist Party	PS	69,408	17.94%	3
Democratic Renewal Party	PRD	34,109	8.82%	1
Social Democratic Centre Party	CDS	7,401	1.91%	0
Popular Democratic Union	UDP	5,858	1.51%	0
Portuguese Democratic Movement	MDP	3,664	0.95%	0
Revolutionary Socialist Party	PSR	2,783	0.72%	0
Portuguese Workers' Communist Party	PCTP	1,871	0.48%	0
Christian Democratic Party	PDC	1,433	0.37%	0
Communist Party (Reconstructed)	PC(R)	1,275	0.33%	0
People's Monarchist Party	PPM	1,021	0.26%	0
Workers' Party of Socialist Unity	POUS	667	0.17%	0
Valid votes		386,929	100.00%	17
Blank votes		3,694	0.94%	
Rejected votes – other		3,471	0.88%	
Total polled		394,094	72.98%	
Registered electors		540,007		

The following candidates were elected: Domingos Abrantes (CDU); Rogério Brito (CDU); António Lopes Cardoso (PS): Francisco Costa (PSD); Cardoso Ferreira (PSD); Eduardo Gomes (PSD); Marques Júnior (PRD); José Manuel Maia (CDU); Eduardo Pereira (PS); Carlos Pimenta (PSD); Carlos Ramildes (CDU); José Reis (PS); Couto dos Santos (PSD); Maria Amélia Santos (CDU); Odete Santos (CDU); Nuno Silvestre (PSD); and José Vitoriano (CDU).

===== 1985 =====
Results of the 1985 legislative election held on 6 October 1985:

Party		Votes	%	Seats
United People Alliance	APU	160,702	38.92%	7
Democratic Renewal Party	PRD	85,902	20.80%	4
Socialist Party	PS	69,585	16.85%	3
Social Democratic Party	PSD	64,674	15.66%	3
Social Democratic Centre Party	CDS	16,140	3.91%	0
Popular Democratic Union	UDP	8,182	1.98%	0
Revolutionary Socialist Party	PSR	2,710	0.66%	0
Portuguese Workers' Communist Party	PCTP	1,543	0.37%	0
Christian Democratic Party	PDC	1,374	0.33%	0
Communist Party (Reconstructed)	PC(R)	1,136	0.28%	0
Workers' Party of Socialist Unity	POUS	987	0.24%	0
Valid votes		412,935	100.00%	17
Blank votes		3,135	0.75%	
Rejected votes – other		4,713	1.12%	
Total polled		420,783	57.00%	
Registered electors		738,253		

The following candidates were elected: Domingos Abrantes (APU); Rogério Brito (APU); Mata Cáceres (PS); José Caeiro (PRD); Ana Crugeira (PRD); Cardoso Ferreira (PSD); Carlos Ganopa (PRD); Eduardo Gomes (PSD); Maldonado Gonelha (PS); Marques Júnior (PRD); José Manuel Maia (APU); Carlos Manafaia (APU); Jorge Patrício (APU); Eduardo Pereira (PS); Carlos Pimenta (PSD); Odete Santos (APU); and José Vitoriano (APU).

===== 1983 =====
Results of the 1983 legislative election held on 25 April 1983:

Party		Votes	%	Seats
United People Alliance	APU	183,372	46.81%	8
Socialist Party	PS	122,531	31.28%	6
Social Democratic Party	PSD	50,657	12.93%	2
Social Democratic Centre Party	CDS	20,578	5.25%	1
Popular Democratic Union	UDP	6,959	1.78%	0
Portuguese Workers' Communist Party	PCTP	1,739	0.44%	0
Revolutionary Socialist Party	PSR	1,590	0.41%	0
Christian Democratic Party	PDC	1,252	0.32%	0
People's Monarchist Party	PPM	1,129	0.29%	0
Workers' Party of Socialist Unity	POUS	989	0.25%	0
Socialist Workers League	LST	504	0.13%	0
Portuguese Marxist–Leninist Communist Organization	OCMLP	468	0.12%	0
Valid votes		391,768	100.00%	17
Blank votes		3,203	0.80%	
Rejected votes – other		5,124	1.28%	
Total polled		400,095	81.73%	
Registered electors		489,553		

The following candidates were elected: Domingos Abrantes (APU); Rogério Brito (APU); Mata Cáceres (PS); Carlos Espadinha (APU); Cardoso Ferreira (PSD); Joel Hasse Ferreira (PS); João Corregedor da Fonseca (APU); Eduardo Gomes (PSD); Maldonado Gonelha (PS); Victor Hugo (PS); José Manuel Maia (APU); Jorge Patrício (APU); Eduardo Pereira (PS); Américo Salteiro (PS); Odete Santos (APU); Henrique Soudo (CDS); and José Vitoriano (APU).

===== 1980 =====
Results of the 1980 legislative election held on 5 October 1980:

Party		Votes	%	Seats
United People Alliance	APU	179,030	44.79%	9
Democratic Alliance	AD	97,930	24.50%	4
Republican and Socialist Front	FRS	95,841	23.98%	4
Popular Democratic Union	UDP	11,453	2.87%	0
Revolutionary Socialist Party	PSR	4,728	1.18%	0
Workers' Party of Socialist Unity	POUS	4,267	1.07%	0
Portuguese Workers' Communist Party	PCTP	2,392	0.60%	0
Labour Party	PT	2,171	0.54%	0
Democratic Party of the Atlantic	PDA	740	0.19%	0
Christian Democratic Party, Independent Movement for the National Reconstruction / Party of the Portuguese Right and National Front	PDC- MIRN/ PDP- FN	608	0.15%	0
Portuguese Marxist–Leninist Communist Organization	OCMLP	522	0.13%	0
Valid votes		399,682	100.00%	17
Blank votes		2,348	0.58%	
Rejected votes – other		5,068	1.24%	
Total polled		407,098	86.82%	
Registered electors		468,891		

The following candidates were elected: Domingos Abrantes (APU); Luís Nunes de Almeida (FRS); Rogério Brito (APU); Mata Cáceres (FRS); Carlos Espadinha (APU); Cardoso Ferreira (AD); José Manuel Maia (APU); Fernando Sousa Marques (APU); Virgílio Nunes (AD); Jorge Patrício (APU); Rui Pena (AD); Eduardo Pereira (FRS); Herculano Pires (FRS); Helena Roseta (AD); Odete Santos (APU); Ercilia Talhadas (APU); and José Vitoriano (APU).

==== 1970s ====
===== 1979 =====
Results of the 1979 legislative election held on 2 December 1979:

Party		Votes	%	Seats
United People Alliance	APU	189,593	47.96%	9
Democratic Alliance	AD	89,978	22.76%	4
Socialist Party	PS	86,192	21.80%	4
Popular Democratic Union	UDP	15,995	4.05%	0
Left-wing Union for the Socialist Democracy	UEDS	3,196	0.81%	0
Portuguese Workers' Communist Party	PCTP	3,140	0.79%	0
Revolutionary Socialist Party	PSR	2,437	0.62%	0
Christian Democratic Party	PDC	2,178	0.55%	0
Workers' Party of Socialist Unity	POUS	1,669	0.42%	0
Portuguese Marxist–Leninist Communist Organization	OCMLP	967	0.24%	0
Valid votes		395,345	100.00%	17
Blank votes		3,260	0.81%	
Rejected votes – other		4,939	1.22%	
Total polled		403,544	88.28%	
Registered electors		457,112		

The following candidates were elected: Domingos Abrantes (APU); Alberto Antunes (PS); Miguel Camolas (AD); Henrique Cardoso (AD); João Cravinho (PS); Carlos Espadinha (APU); José Aranha Figueiredo (APU); José Manuel Maia (APU); Fernando Sousa Marques (APU); Eduardo Pereira (PS); Emídio Pinheiro (AD); Herculano Pires (PS); Freitas Rodrigues (APU); Helena Roseta (AD); Jaime Serra (APU); Ercilia Talhadas (APU); and Marino Vicente (APU).

===== 1976 =====
Results of the 1976 legislative election held on 25 April 1976:

Party		Votes	%	Seats
Portuguese Communist Party	PCP	159,087	45.95%	9
Socialist Party	PS	115,352	33.32%	7
Democratic People's Party	PPD	30,142	8.71%	1
Social Democratic Centre Party	CDS	15,724	4.54%	0
Popular Democratic Union	UDP	10,057	2.90%	0
People's Socialist Front	FSP	3,467	1.00%	0
Re-Organized Movement of the Party of the Proletariat	MRPP	3,194	0.92%	0
Communist Party of Portugal (Marxist–Leninist)	PCP(ML)	2,987	0.86%	0
Movement of Socialist Left	MES	2,242	0.65%	0
People's Monarchist Party	PPM	973	0.28%	0
Worker–Peasant Alliance	AOC	911	0.26%	0
Christian Democratic Party	PDC	885	0.26%	0
Internationalist Communist League	LCI	653	0.19%	0
Workers' Revolutionary Party	PRT	565	0.16%	0
Valid votes		346,239	100.00%	17
Rejected votes		12,436	3.47%	
Total polled		358,675	84.73%	
Registered electors		423,293		

The following candidates were elected: Domingos Abrantes (PCP); Alberto Antunes (PS); Alfredo Carvalho (PS); Mata Cáceres (PS); Duarte Gomes (PCP); Maldonado Gonelha (PS); António Juzarte (PCP); Américo Leal (PCP); Rui Machete (PPD); José Manuel Maia (PCP); Fernando Sousa Marques (PCP); Hermenegilda Pereira (PCP); José Justiniano Pinto (PS); Herculano Pires (PS); António Aires Rodrigues (PS); Jaime Serra (PCP); and Ercilia Talhadas (PCP).
