= Sonia dos Reis =

Portuguese academic and politician

Member of the Assembly of the Republic
- Incumbent
- Assumed office 26 March 2024
- Constituency: Setúbal

Member of the Grândola Municipal Assembly
- Incumbent
- Assumed office October 2021

Personal details
- Born: 27 June 1977 (age 49) Grândola, Portugal
- Party: Social Democratic Party
- Education: University of Lisbon
- Occupation: Entrepreneur

Sonia dos Reis (born 1977) is a Portuguese politician. As a member of the Social Democratic Party (PSD), she is a deputy in the 16th legislature of the Assembly of the Republic of Portugal, having previously served in the 13th legislature.

== Early life and education ==
Reis comes from Grândola in the Setúbal District of Portugal. She was born on 27 June 1977 and was educated in Grândola. She obtained a degree in international relations from the University of Lisbon in 2008. While studying for her degree she worked as a market researcher and a product manager for a publishing house. Later, she worked as a trainer for another publisher. Since 2015 she has run her own business as an agent for international brands. Between 2010 and 2020 she was president of the Lions Club of Grândola.

== Political career ==
Reis became a member of the Grândola municipal assembly in 2010, serving until 2017. For a time, she was the leader of the PSD group in the assembly. She rejoined the municipal assembly in 2021 and again became leader of the PSD group. In the 2024 national election the PSD formed a coalition with two smaller parties to fight the election, known as the Democratic Alliance (AD). Reis was fourth on the list of AD candidates for the Setúbal district and the coalition won four seats, resulting in her election. In the parliament she was appointed to be a member of the Committee on Agriculture and Food.
