= Catarina Marcelino =

Portuguese politician and anthropologist

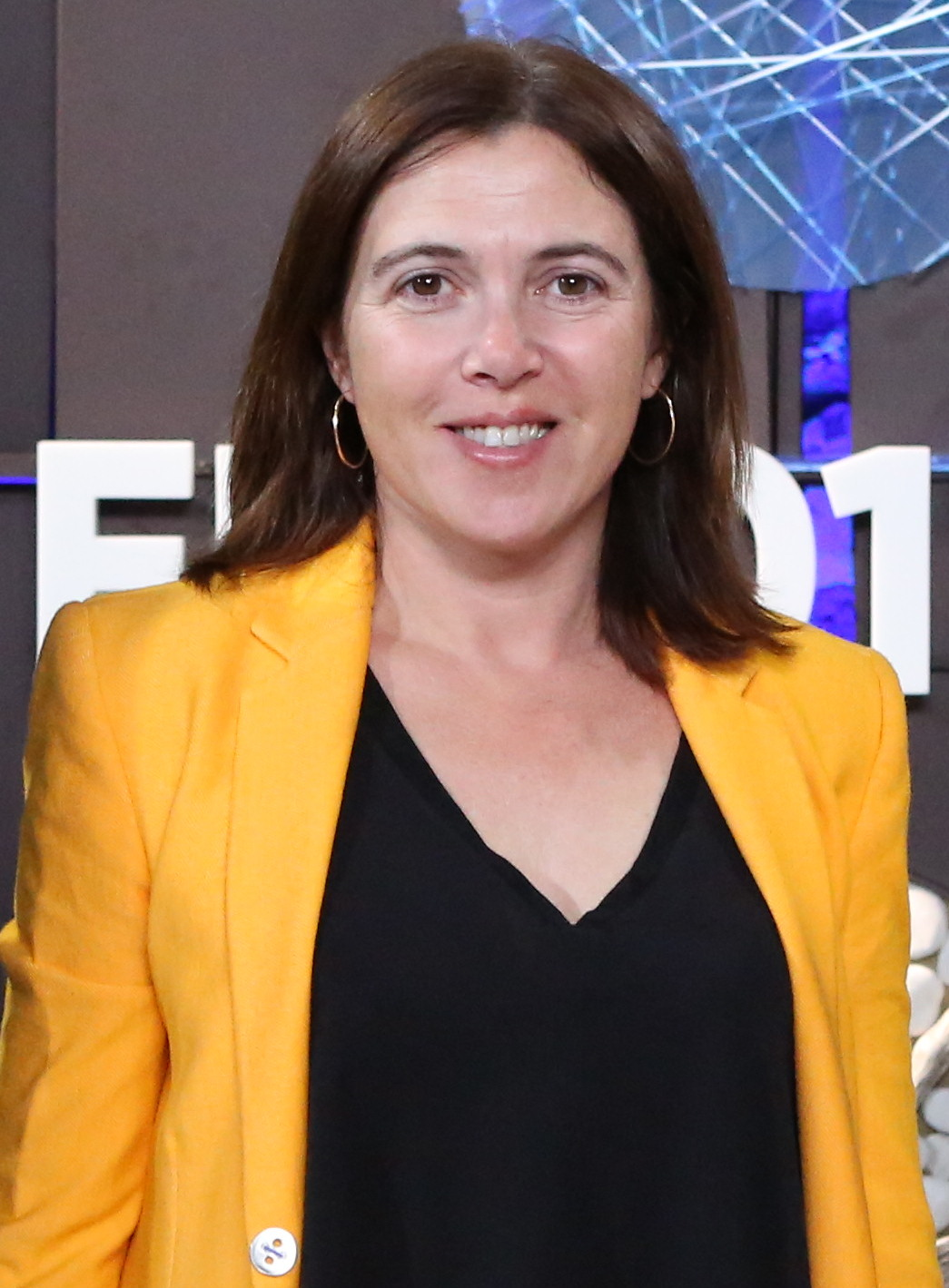

Deputy of the Assembly of the Republic of Portugal
- In office 2009–2020
- Parliamentary group: Portuguese Socialist Party (PS)
- Constituency: Setúbal

Personal details
- Born: Catarina Marcelino Rosa da Silva; 25 January 1971 (age 55) Montijo, Portugal
- Party: Portuguese: Portuguese Socialist Party (PS)
- Spouse: Luís Filipe Guerreiro Albino
- Education: Catholic University of Portugal
- Occupation: Lawyer

Catarina Marcelino (born 1971) is a Portuguese anthropologist and politician. She served as Secretary of State for Citizenship and Equality in the 21st Portuguese Constitutional Government between 2015 and 2017 and was a deputy in the Assembly of the Republic of Portugal from 2009 to 2020, when she left in order to fill the position of vice-president of the Instituto da Segurança Social (Institute of Social Security - ISS).

== Early life ==
Catarina Marcelino Rosa da Silva was born in Montijo, in the Setúbal District of Portugal on 25 January 1971. She graduated in anthropology from the ISCTE – University Institute of Lisbon and obtained a master's in gender, power and violence from the Instituto Superior de Psicologia Aplicada (ISPA), also in Lisbon.

== Political career ==
Marcelino joined the Portuguese Socialist Party (PS). She worked for Montijo and Lisbon municipal councils and then became the president of the municipal assembly of her home town of Montijo. She was deputy to the Secretary of State for Social Security from 2005 to 2009 and served as chair of the Commission for Equality in Work and Employment from February to October 2009. In 2009 she was elected as a deputy in the Assembly of the Republic, serving in the 11th, 12th, 13th and 14th Legislatures, between 2009 and 2020. Between 2010 and 2013 she was president of the National Department of Socialist Women. Between 2015 and 2017, she served as Secretary of State for Citizenship and Equality in the 21st Portuguese Constitutional Government and, on returning to the Assembly, was vice-president of the parliamentary commission on Labour and Social Security. She resigned from the Assembly in 2020 in order to be the vice-president of the Institute of Social Security.

In addition to government activities, Marcelino has been linked to numerous volunteer projects, such as support for homeless people and work with the Portuguese League Against AIDS, as well as support to NGOs working in the former Portuguese colony of Guinea Bissau. She is a regular contributor of articles to Portuguese newspapers.

== Awards and honours ==
- In 2017 Marcelino received the 2017 Prémio Arco-íris (Rainbow Prize) from the Associação ILGA Portugal – (Lesbian, Gay, Bisexual, Trans and Intersex Association).

The citation for her prize noted that: "Governments are one of the main agents of discrimination and stigmatization of lesbian, gay, bisexual, trans and intersex people. Today, it is essential that whoever represents the State realizes the enormous responsibility of their role. Catarina Marcelino, knew how to do this. She implemented policies that promote effective equality and ensured for the first time the existence of specific resources to support LGBTI victims. She was personally involved in the Government's draft law that established the right to self-determination of gender identity and the right to protection of sexual characteristics - an initiative built in constant dialogue with LGBTI associations. She combated discrimination in areas as diverse as sport, work and religion."
