= Nuno Gabriel =

Portuguese politician (born 1978)

Member of the Assembly of the Republic
- Incumbent
- Assumed office 26 March 2024
- Constituency: Setúbal

Personal details
- Born: 1 January 1978 (age 48)
- Party: Chega

Nuno Miguel da Costa Gabriel (born 1 January 1978) is a Portuguese politician serving as a member of the Assembly of the Republic since 2024. He has served as president of Chega in the Setúbal District since 2022.
