= Paula Santos =

Portuguese politician

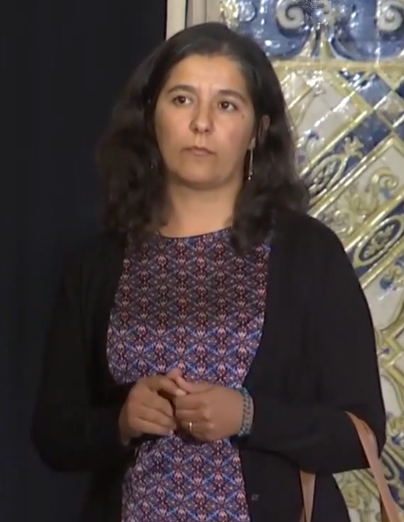
- Paula Santos in 2023

Member of the Assembly of the Republic
- Incumbent
- Assumed office 2011
- Prime Minister: António Costa
- Constituency: Setúbal

Personal details
- Born: 29 September 1980 (age 46) Lisbon, Portugal
- Party: Portuguese Communist Party
- Spouse: Laurentino Vladimiro Neves Barbosa Santos
- Education: University of Lisbon
- Profession: Chemist

Paula Santos (born 29 September 1980) is a Portuguese chemist and politician. She has been a deputy to the Assembly of the Republic representing the Portuguese Communist Party (PCP) in the Setúbal constituency since 2009. In 2022 she became the leader of the PCP in the Assembly.

== Early life and education ==
Paula Alexandra Sobral Guerreiro Santos Barbosa was born on 29 September 1980 in the Portuguese capital of Lisbon, but has lived in Seixal in the Setúbal District all her life. Her parents were both members of the Communist Party. She went to secondary school in Amora and was active in student politics, and then studied at the Faculty of Sciences of the University of Lisbon, where she was a student leader and obtained a degree in chemistry.

== Political career ==
A member of the Portuguese Communist Party (PCP), Santos was initially active in the Portuguese Communist Youth, before being elected to the municipal assembly of Seixal in 2005 and becoming a member of the city council of Seixal between 2005 and 2009. In 2009 she was elected to the Assembly of the Republic to represent Setúbal and was re-elected in the 2011, 2015, 2019 and 2022 elections. Following the disappointing performance by the PCP in the January 2022 elections, when it won only six seats, half as many as in the previous parliament, she became the party's leader in the Assembly, replacing João Oliveira, who was not re-elected, making her the first woman to hold that office in the history of the party.

In the XI Legislature (2009–2011) she worked on the parliamentary committees on Environment, Spatial Planning and Local Power; Foreign Affairs and Portuguese Communities; and Health. In the XII Legislature (2011–2015) she remained on those committees and was active on several health-related working groups, including those on death certificates; non-conventional therapeutics; medically assisted procreation; palliative care; and alcohol and drug addiction. In the XIII Legislature (2015–2019) she was coordinator and vice-president of the European Affairs Committee, and belonged to the Environment, Spatial Planning, Decentralization, Local Power and Housing Committee. She coordinated the parliamentary working group dedicated to the national programme for spatial planning policy, and was also a member of working groups involved with the scrutiny of European initiatives; the local finance law; and others. From 2019 to 2022 in the XI Legislature she was vice-president and coordinator of the Health Committee and coordinator of the Committee on Public Administration, Administrative Modernization, Decentralization and Local Power.

On 21 April 2022, after the president of Ukraine, Volodymyr Zelenskyy, addressed the Assembly of the Republic by teleconference during the Russian invasion of his country, Santos said that his speech "served to encourage confrontation, clearly visible in the call for more weapons and sanctions". She also considered that the leaders of Ukraine were xenophobic and warmongering. Her party has always had close relations with Russia and, before that, the Soviet Union.
