= Heloísa Apolónia =

Portuguese politician

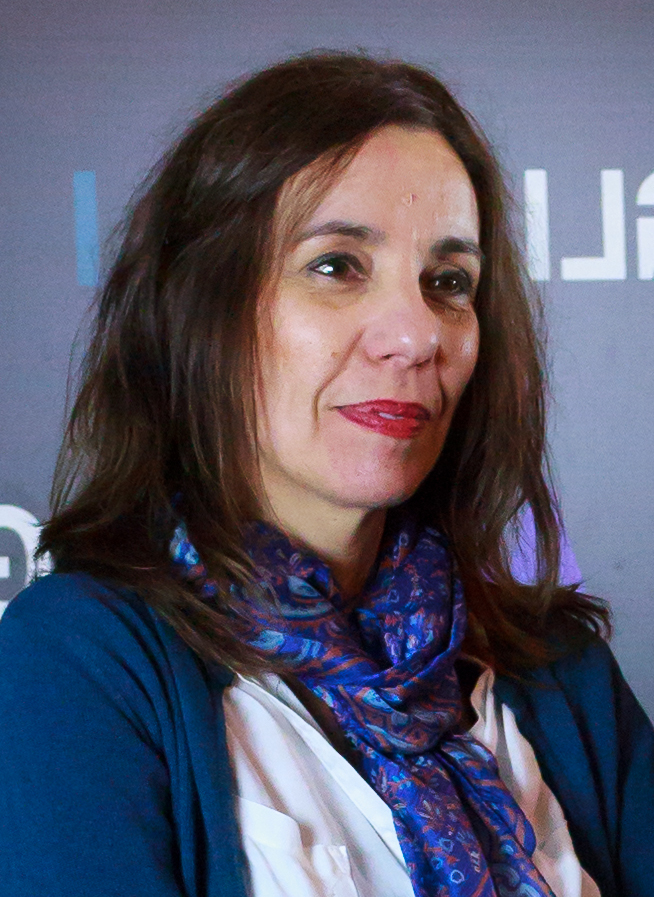
Heloísa Apolónia in January 2019

Heloísa Augusta Baião de Brito Apolónia (born 26 June 1969 in Barreiro, Setúbal District) is a Portuguese politician and jurist who is secretary of the Ecologist Party "The Greens".

She was first elected to the Assembly of the Republic for Setubal in 1995, and held her seat in six further legislative elections. In 2019 she instead ran in Leiria District and was not elected.
