= Bruno Dias =

Portuguese politician (born 1976)

Member of the Assembly of the Republic
- In office 30 October 2019 – 25 March 2024
- Preceded by: Francisco Lopes
- Constituency: Setúbal
- In office 13 April 2007 – 24 October 2019
- Preceded by: Odete Santos
- Constituency: Setúbal
- In office 5 April 2002 – 9 March 2005
- Constituency: Setúbal

Member of the Municipal Assembly of Almada
- Incumbent
- Assumed office 1997

Personal details
- Born: Bruno Ramos Dias; 19 October 1976 (age 49) Lisbon, Portugal
- Party: Portuguese Communist Party
- Other political affiliations: Unitary Democratic Coalition
- Education: NOVA University Lisbon

Bruno Ramos Dias (born 19 October 1976) is a Portuguese politician and former member of the Assembly of the Republic, the national legislature of Portugal. A communist, he has represented Setúbal from April 2002 to March 2005, from April 2007 to October 2019 and from October 2019 to March 2024. He had also been a temporary substitute member of the Assembly from September 2001 to April 2002.

== Early life ==
Dias was born on 19 October 1976 in Lisbon. He studied at the Escola Secundária de Cacilhas in Almada. He has a degree in communication sciences from NOVA University Lisbon's Faculty of Social and Human Sciences.

== Career ==
Dias worked for the Portugalmente programme on RTP2 and contributed to the LX Jovem newspaper. He worked for the communications department at Barreiro Municipal Council. He is a local administration technician.

Dias was a member of the executive and political committee of the Portuguese Communist Youth (JCP)'s national directorate from 1994 to 1999. He is a member of the Portuguese Communist Party's central committee, Setúbal regional directorate and Almada municipal commission. He is on the board of the Movement for the Rights of the Palestinian People and for Peace in the Middle East (Movimento pelos Direitos do Povo Palestino e pela Paz no Médio Oriente) and president of the Portugal-Palestine Parliamentary Friendship Group (Grupo Parlamentar de Amizade Portugal - Palestina). He has been a member of the municipal council in Almada since 1997.

Dias was appointed temporarily to the Assembly of the Republic in September 2001, substituting for Manuel Duran Clemente. He was re-elected at the 2002 legislative election. At the 2005 legislative election Dias was placed fourth in the Unitary Democratic Coalition (CDU)'s list of candidates in Setúbal but the alliance only won three seats in the constituency. He was appointed to the Assembly as permanent member in April 2007 following the resignation of Odete Santos. He was temporarily replaced by Eugénio Rosa from October 2008 to December 2008.

Dias was re-elected at the 2009 and 2011 legislative elections. He was temporarily replaced by José Alberto Lourenço from April 2012 to May 2012. He was re-elected at the 2015 legislative election. At the 2019 legislative election Dias was placed fourth in the CDU's list of candidates in Setúbal but the alliance only won three seats in the constituency. However, he was appointed to the Assembly as permanent member in October 2019 following Francisco Lopes's resignation. He was re-elected at the 2022 legislative election. At the 2024 legislative election Dias was placed second in the CDU's list of candidates in Setúbal but the alliance only won a single seat in the constituency.

== Electoral history ==
Electoral history of Bruno Dias
Election	Constituency	Party	Alliance	No.	Result
1997 local	Almada Municipal Assembly	Portuguese Communist Party	Unitary Democratic Coalition	6	Elected
2001 local	Almada Municipal Assembly	Portuguese Communist Party	Unitary Democratic Coalition	6	Elected
2002 legislative	Setúbal	Portuguese Communist Party	Unitary Democratic Coalition	4	Elected
2005 legislative	Setúbal	Portuguese Communist Party	Unitary Democratic Coalition	4	Not elected
2005 local	Almada Municipal Assembly	Portuguese Communist Party	Unitary Democratic Coalition	4	Elected
2009 legislative	Setúbal	Portuguese Communist Party	Unitary Democratic Coalition	4	Elected
2009 local	Almada Municipal Assembly	Portuguese Communist Party	Unitary Democratic Coalition	2	Elected
2011 legislative	Setúbal	Portuguese Communist Party	Unitary Democratic Coalition	4	Elected
2013 local	Almada Municipal Assembly	Portuguese Communist Party	Unitary Democratic Coalition	2	Elected
2015 legislative	Setúbal	Portuguese Communist Party	Unitary Democratic Coalition	4	Elected
2017 local	Almada Municipal Assembly	Portuguese Communist Party	Unitary Democratic Coalition	2	Elected
2019 legislative	Setúbal	Portuguese Communist Party	Unitary Democratic Coalition	4	Not elected
2021 local	Almada Municipal Assembly	Portuguese Communist Party	Unitary Democratic Coalition	1	Elected
2022 legislative	Setúbal	Portuguese Communist Party	Unitary Democratic Coalition	2	Elected
2024 legislative	Setúbal	Portuguese Communist Party	Unitary Democratic Coalition	2	Not elected
