= Clarisse Campos =

Portuguese politician (born 1963)

Clarisse Maria Gaudino Veredas Campos

Member of the Assembly of the Republic
- Incumbent
- Assumed office 2019
- Constituency: Setúbal

Personal details
- Born: 5 August 1963 (age 62) Alcácer do Sal, Setúbal District, Portugal
- Party: Portuguese: Socialist Party (PS)
- Spouse: João Alvaro Agostinho Batista Campos
- Children: Two
- Occupation: Librarian • politician

Clarisse Maria Gaudino Veredas Campos (born 1963) is a Portuguese politician. As a member of the Portuguese Socialist Party (PS), she was elected as a deputy in the Portuguese Assembly of the Republic in 2019, representing the Setúbal constituency, and was re-elected in 2022 and 2024.

== Early life and career ==
Campos was born on 5 August 1963 in Alcácer do Sal in the Setúbal District of Portugal. She obtained a degree in international relations and a master's in documentary sciences. From 2012 she was employed as a librarian by the municipality of Alcácer do Sal, prior to that having been a librarian in Ferreira do Alentejo in the Beja District. Between 2016 and 2019 she was deputy director and then director of the Alentejo Litoral Employment and Professional Training Centre.

== Political career ==
In 2017 Campos became a councillor without portfolio in the Alcácer do Sal municipal council. In 2021 she stood for president, or mayor, of the municipality, but was not elected. In 2019 she was included on the PS list for the Setúbal constituency, in which the party won nine of the available seats. She was re-elected in the 2022 election, which gave the PS an overall majority in the National Assembly and again in 2024 when she was seventh on the list, with the PS winning seven seats. In the parliament, Campos serves on the Agriculture and Fisheries Committee and on the Committee on Culture, Media, Youth and Sport. She is a frequent contributor to the local newspaper, O Setubalense.
