= Patrícia Carvalho =

Portuguese politician (born 1987)

Patrícia de Carvalho
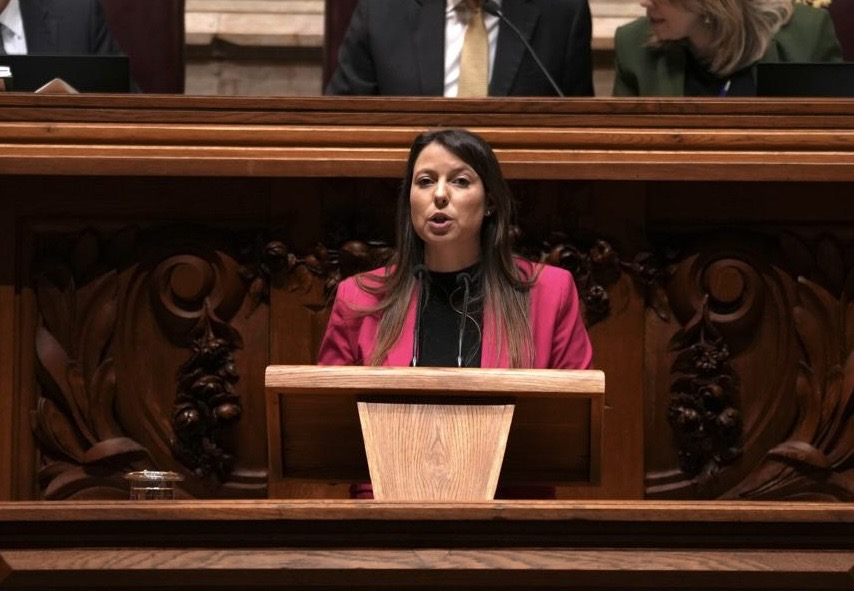

Member of the Assembly of the Republic
- Incumbent
- Assumed office 26 March 2024
- Constituency: Setúbal

Director of National Communications of CHEGA
- Incumbent
- Assumed office 30 May 2021

Personal details
- Born: 19 December 1987 (age 38) Lisbon, Portugal
- Party: CHEGA
- Occupation: Politician: journalist

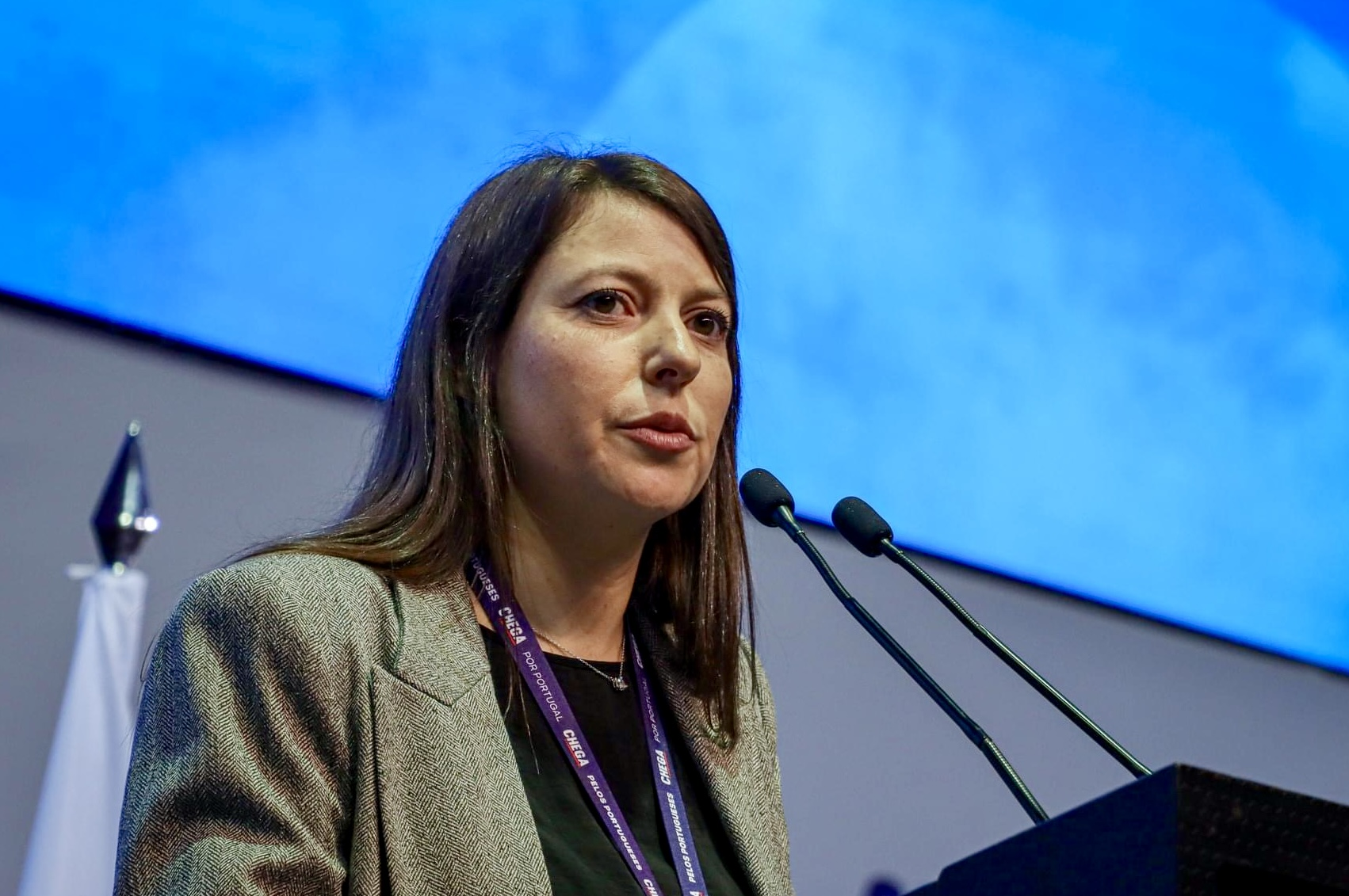
Patrícia de Carvalho

Patrícia Alexandra Martins de Carvalho (born 1987) is a Portuguese politician and journalist. In the 2024 Portuguese national election she was elected to the Assembly of the Republic as a representative of the right-wing CHEGA party. She also serves as an assistant director of the national directorate of the party and is its director of national communications.

== Early life and education ==
Carvalho was born in the Portuguese capital of Lisbon on 19 December 1987. She obtained an undergraduate degree in social and cultural communication from the Catholic University of Portugal and completed a master's degree in cultural management from the same university in 2010. She then worked as a trainee journalist at the newspaper Correio da Manhã for nine months, until the end of 2011. She joined the online newspaper Notícias ao Minuto in July 2012, where she stayed for less than a year, returning to Correio da Manhã, where she stayed until December 2013. She then went back to Notícias ao Minuto, writing as Patrícia Martins Carvalho, staying there until the end of 2019 when she was appointed as CHEGA's communications advisor.

== Political career ==
CHEGA was a new right-wing party, considered by some to be extreme right, that was founded in 2019. In the 2019 national election its leader, André Ventura, was the only member to win a seat in the Assembly of the Republic. After his election he invited Carvalho to become his press advisor and director of national communications. In the 2022 national election Carvalho was placed second on the list of CHEGA candidates for the Setúbal constituency but the party only won one seat in Setúbal District, winning 12 nationally. In the 2024 election, called after the resignation of the Socialist prime minister, António Costa, she was again second on the CHEGA list for Setúbal. This time CHEGA won four of the 19 seats available in the constituency and 50 overall.

In the parliament Carvalho is a member of the Committee on Culture, Communication, Youth and Sport.
