= Conceição Matos =

Portuguese communist and political prisoner (born 1936)

- Born: 1936 (age 89–90); São Pedro do Sul, Portugal
- Other name: Maria da Conceição Rodrigues de Matos
- Known for: Political prisoner during the Portuguese Estado Novo regime
- Political party: Portuguese Communist Party
- Spouse: Domingos Abrantes (1963-)

Conceição Matos is a Portuguese communist who campaigned against the authoritarian rule of the Estado Novo regime in the 1960s. She was arrested and subjected to considerable torture.

== Early life ==
Maria da Conceição Rodrigues de Matos was born in 1936 in São Pedro do Sul in the Viseu District of Portugal. Three years later, her family moved to the industrial area of Barreiro on the left bank of the Tagus river, to the immediate south of the Portuguese capital of Lisbon, living in what she has described as a "wooden shack". Her mother had 16 children, of whom only 5 survived. She ceased school at a young age and went to work, having a variety of jobs, including dressmaker, working in a soft-drinks factory and working in a cork factory and for the conglomerate Companhia União Fabril (CUF).

== Becoming a communist ==
When she was 18, Matos spent three months in a sanatorium with tuberculosis. In the same year, her brother Alfredo was arrested by the PIDE, Portugal's secret police under the Estado Novo. Because of this event, she joined the anti-government cause, starting her political activity with the youth wing of the Movement of Democratic Unity (Movimento de Unidade Democrática or MUD). In the 1950s, she met the man who was to become her husband, Domingos Abrantes, and became a member of the Portuguese Communist Party (PCP). From 1963, she went into hiding with Abrantes, who was responsible for PCP activities south of the River Tagus and at the time was best-known for being one of the political prisoners to escape from Caxias prison on the outskirts of Lisbon in 1961. During this clandestine existence, Matos distributed the PCP newspaper Avante!, wrote propaganda materials, and looked after the houses where she and Abrantes lived in Amora, Costa da Caparica and Montijo, all in the Setúbal District.

== Arrests ==
On 21 April 1965, the couple were arrested in their house in Montijo by the PIDE and guards from the National Republican Guard (GNR). Held in Caxias prison, she was accused of carrying out activities against national security. Matos spent a year and a half in preventive detention. During this time she was interrogated and tortured at the PIDE headquarters in Lisbon. She was subjected to sleep deprivation and forbidden to use the toilet. When nature took its course, she had to clean up with her own clothes and was left naked to be seen by the police. In 1968, she was arrested again, held at Caxias prison for two months and again tortured. Meanwhile, Abrantes was still being held in Peniche Fortress, another of the prisons designated by the Estado Novo for political prisoners. They were married in the prison in 1969 so that she could have visitor's rights and they could exchange letters. Matos worked at the National Commission for Relief to Political Prisoners (CNSPP) until Abrantes was released in 1973, when they left Portugal and went to Paris, where they briefly worked for the PCP.

== Later life ==
On 25 April 1974 the Carnation Revolution overthrew the Estado Novo. The couple returned to Lisbon, on the same plane as the PCP leader Álvaro Cunhal, the composer, Luís Cília, who wrote the PCP's anthem Avante camarada (Forward comrade), and the singer-songwriter, José Mário Branco, an opponent of Portugal's colonial wars, on what became known as the "freedom plane". She recalled: "There were also many political exiles [on the plane], including José Mário Branco. We sang so much ..." Matos worked as an employee of the PCP until she retired.
