= Manuela Arcanjo =

Portuguese academic and politician (born 1954)

Minister of Health
- In office 1999–2001

Secretary of State for the Budget
- In office 1995–1998

Personal details
- Born: 12 April 1954 (age 72) Portugal
- Party: Portuguese: Socialist Party (PS)
- Education: University of Lisbon

Manuela Arcanjo is a Portuguese university professor. She was Secretary of State for the Budget in Portugal between 1995 and 1998, and Minister of Health between 1999 and 2001.

== Education ==
Maria Manuela de Brito Arcanjo Marques da Costa was born on 12 April 1954. She obtained a degree in Economics from the Instituto Superior de Ciências do Trabalho e da Empresa (Higher Institute of Labor and Business Sciences) of the University of Lisbon in 1978, and a PhD in Economics from the Instituto Superior de Economia e Gestão (ISEG), also known as the Lisbon School of Economics and Management.

== Political activities ==
In October 1995 she was appointed by the prime minister, António Guterres, to be Secretary of State for the Budget. In this capacity she was responsible for preparing the annual Portuguese budgets. She resigned from the post in 1998 after disagreements with the Minister of Finance, António de Sousa Franco. In the 1999 national elections, Arcanjo was elected as a Deputy to the Assembly of the Republic of Portugal, representing Setúbal as a member of the Portuguese Socialist Party (PS). She was then appointed Minister of Health by Guterres, a post she held for 22 months before again resigning, on the grounds that she lacked the resources to carry out her responsibilities.

== Subsequent career ==
Arcanjo became a professor at ISEG, specializing in public finance. In this capacity she continues to be concerned with the country's annual budget, carrying out annual analyses with others under the name of "Budget Watch". These often result in significant criticisms, such as one made in 2013 when she said, ironically, that the Government was hoping that people would die before it had to pay their pensions. Concern with the poverty of retirement has been one of the areas of work in which Arcanjo has concentrated.

== Publications ==
=== Working papers ===
- Manuela Arcanjo, 2018. Unemployment protection reforms in Southern European countries between 2004 and 2016 and the trade-off between efficiency and equity, Working Papers. Department of Economics 2018/10, ISEG - Lisbon School of Economics and Management, Department of Economics, University of Lisbon
- Manuela Arcanjo, Amélia Bastos, Francisco Nunes & José Passos, 2012. How do work and public policies interact with child poverty? Working Papers. Department of Economics 2012/14, ISEG - Lisbon School of Economics and Management, Department of Economics, University of Lisbon
- Manuela Arcanjo, 2009. The Reform of Unemployment Protection Insurance, 1993-2007: the Erosion of Legislated Rights in France, Germany, Portugal and Spain, Working Papers. Department of Economics 2009/01, ISEG - Lisbon School of Economics and Management, Department of Economics, University of Lisbon
- Manuela Arcanjo, 2009. Regimes and Reform of Welfare State: the Classification of ten European Countries in 1990 and 2006, Working Papers. Department of Economics 2009/34, ISEG - Lisbon School of Economics and Management, Department of Economics, University of Lisbon
- José A. Pereirinha, Manuela Arcanjo & Daniel F. Carolo, 2009. Prestações Sociais no Corporativismo Português: A Política de Apoio à Familia no Período do Estado Novo (Social Benefits in Portuguese Corporatism: The Family Support Policy in the Estado Novo Period), Working Papers. GHES - Office of Economic and Social History 2009/35, ISEG - Lisbon School of Economics and Management, GHES - Social and Economic History Research Unit, University of Lisbon
- Paula Albuquerque, Manuela Arcanjo & Vítor Escária, 2009. Early Retirement in Portugal, Working Papers. Department of Economics 2009/39, ISEG - Lisbon School of Economics and Management, Department of Economics, University of Lisbon
- Manuela Arcanjo, 2006. Ideal (and Real) Types of Welfare State, Working Papers. Department of Economics 2006/06, ISEG - Lisbon School of Economics and Management, Department of Economics, University of Lisbon
- Paula Albuquerque, Manuela Arcanjo, Vítor Escária, Francisco Nunes & José Pereirinha, 2006. Retirement and the Poverty of the Elderly in Portugal, Working Papers. Department of Economics 2006/15, ISEG - Lisbon School of Economics and Management, Department of Economics, University of Lisbon

=== Articles ===
- Arcanjo, M, Bastos, A., Nunes, F. & Passos, J., 2013. Child poverty and the reform of family cash benefits, Journal of Behavioral and Experimental Economics (formerly The Journal of Socio-Economics), Elsevier, vol. 43(C), pages 11–23.
- Paula Albuquerque, Manuela Arcanjo, Vítor Escária, Francisco Nunes & José Pereirinha, 2010. Retirement and the Poverty of the Elderly: The Case of Portugal, Journal of Income Distribution, Ad libros publications inc., vol. 19(3-4), pages 41–64, September.

=== Textbook ===
- Santos, José Carlos Gomes, Arcanjo, Manuela, Afonso, António & Pereira, Paulo Trigo. Economia e Finanças Públicas (Economy and Public Finances) - 5th. Edition. Escolar Editora, 2016. ISBN 9789725924921
