= Domingos Abrantes =

Portuguese politician

His Excellency Domingos Abrantes
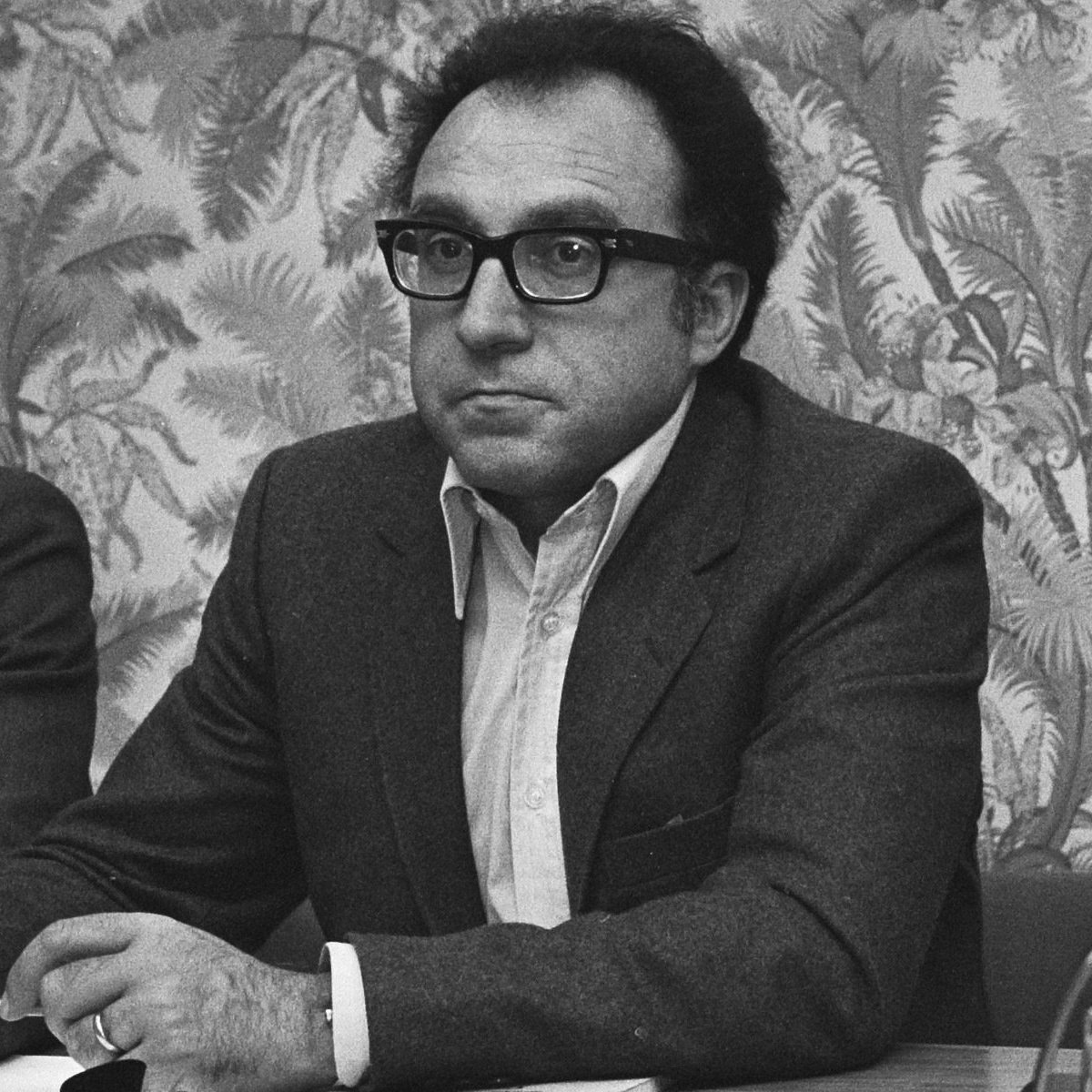
- Domingos Abrantes in 1980

Member of the Council of State
- Incumbent
- Assumed office 12 January 2016
- Appointed by: Assembly of the Republic
- President: Aníbal Cavaco Silva; Marcelo Rebelo de Sousa

Member of the Assembly of the Republic Elections: 1976, 1979, 1980, 1983, 1985, 1987, 1991
- In office 4 November 1991 – 26 October 1995
- Constituency: Lisbon
- In office 3 June 1976 – 3 November 1991
- Constituency: Setúbal

Personal details
- Born: Domingos Abrantes Ferreira; 19 January 1936 (age 90) Vila Franca de Xira, Portugal
- Party: Portuguese Communist Party (1954-present)
- Domestic partner: Conceição Matos (1963-present)

Domingos Abrantes Ferreira (born 19 January 1936), generally known as Domingos Abrantes, is a Portuguese Communist politician. He has been a member of the Portuguese Communist Party since 1954, and was a member of its Central Committee between 1963 and 2012.

Domingos Abrantes was also a political prisoner during the Estado Novo dictatorship. He was arrested for the first time in 1959, and in 1961 took part in the famed escape from Caxias prison. He was again arrested in 1965, being released only in 1973.

After the Carnation Revolution he was elected member of the Assembly of the Republic for the first time in 1976, retiring from the legislature in 1995. He served as member of the Portuguese Council of State from 2016 to 2022.

== Early life and education ==
Domingos Abrantes Ferreira was born on 19 January 1936 in Vila Franca de Xira in Lisbon, Portugal which was then under Estado Novo regime. His family moved early on in his life to Poço do Bispo, another part of Lisbon, where he grew up with his four brothers. His family was a poor working-class family. In his childhood, the environment he grew up in was anti-fascist.

At age eleven, he began working in a factory in Poço do Bispo. Although from a working-class family, one of his teachers said Abrantes should continue his education.

== Political career ==
As part of the Communist party, Abrantes was responsible for communist operations on the south bank of the Tagus. Abrantes protested against the reopening of Tarrafal concentration camp in Cape Verde and the Portuguese Colonial war.

=== Political prisoner ===
Abrantes was first arrested in 1959, where he was sent to Caxias prison near Lisbon. On 4 December 1961, he and seven other prisoners broke through the prison's gate with an armored Chrysler that had been gifted to Portuguese Prime-minister António de Oliveira Salazar by Adolf Hitler. The escape had been planned over 19 months, but lasted a minute. During the escape, the Chrysler was hit 19 times by bullets from the police. To prevent being followed by police, António Tereso, who was one of the escapee, drained the police cars of fuel.

Following his escape, he met his future partner, Conceição Matos, who was also a member of the Communist party. On 21 April 1965, they were both arrested. Abrantes was sent back to Caxias for interrogations, before being sent to the headquarters of the International and State Defense Police (PIDE) in Lisbon where he was subjected to sleep torture for 16 days. He then spent the rest of his jail time imprisoned in Peniche until 1973 . When he was imprisoned in Peniche fortress, the future President of Portugal, Jorge Sampaio, acted as his lawyer.

== Personal life ==
It was following his escape from Caxias that he met Conceição Matos. Matos had been member of the Portuguese Communist party since 1963 and were both arrested in 1965. They then settled in rented homes in Amora, Costa da Caparica and Montijo. Despite their marriage in 1969 in Peniche, they never legally became husband and wife. When Abrantes was spending his time in jail in Peniche, Matos was not allowed to visit him and they only communicated in coded letters.

During his time in Caxias, he learnt to play chess. On a vacation in Hungary, he won a game against a Hungarian chess champion.
