= Nuno Magalhães =

Portuguese politician and lawyer

Member of the Assembly of the Republic
- In office 10 March 2005 – 25 October 2019
- Constituency: Setúbal

Personal details
- Born: Nuno Miguel Miranda de Magalhães; 4 March 1972 (age 54) Luanda, Portuguese Angola
- Party: CDS – People's Party
- Education: University of Lisbon
- Occupation: Lawyer • Politician

Nuno Miguel Miranda de Magalhães (born 4 March 1972) is a Portuguese lawyer and politician. He is a member of the CDS – People's Party and was a member of the Assembly of the Republic for Setúbal between 2005 and 2019.

He was born in Luanda, Portuguese Angola and moved to Portugal in 1974 during decolonisation, and settled in Caldas da Rainha. He qualified as a lawyer in 1996.

Magalhães was elected CDS–PP parliamentary leader in June 2011 by unanimous vote from the party's 24 legislators. He was re-elected to the role several times, including again unanimously in March 2017.

In January 2012, Portuguese news sources named Magalhães as one of three parliamentary leaders who are freemasons. He said that although he is not a member of the fraternity, he attends their events with his wife, who is a member.
