= O Setubalense =

Portuguese daily newspaper (founded 1855)

- Editor-in-chief: Francisco Alves Rito
- Founded: 1 July 1855
- Ceased publication: December 1857
- Relaunched: 10 August 1916
- City: Setúbal
- Country: Portugal
- Website: osetubalense.com

O Setubalense is a daily newspaper covering the Setúbal District of Portugal. It is the oldest newspaper title in Portugal still being published, although it has not been published continuously. The paper was founded by João Carlos de Almeida Carvalho and was first published on 1 July 1855, at that time targeted mainly at the inhabitants of the town of Setúbal rather than the surrounding areas.

== History ==
In 1855 when the paper was founded, Setúbal had a population of around 15,000 and was gradually beginning to expand economically. In 1860, its status was elevated to that of a city by King Pedro V, in 1861, the city's railway station was inaugurated and in 1863, gas lighting was introduced. Its founder and first editor, João Carlos de Almeida Carvalho (1817–1897), had right-wing principles and was a monarchist. He purchased a printing press and installed it in what is now Rua Tenente Valadim. The editorial office was located nearby at Rua do Romeu 27. The first issue noted that:

The modern press is a necessary condition for the progress of men, it is the life of the political institutions of the society in which we live; without freedom of the press, the moral world would fall into the chaos of obscurantism, and humanity, always oppressed and defeated by the onslaughts of tyranny, would sink into the abyss of slavery, because it would lack the rudder of unburdened intelligence, the light of which only the free press knows how to transmit from generation to generation.

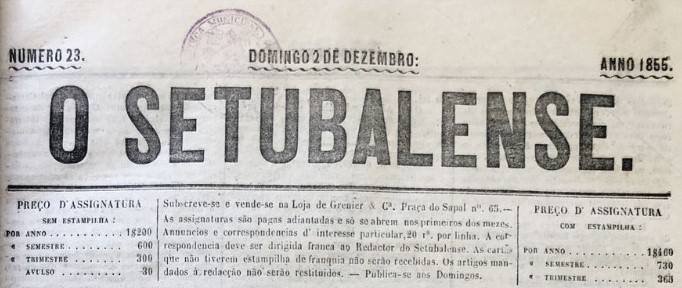
Front page logo from 1855

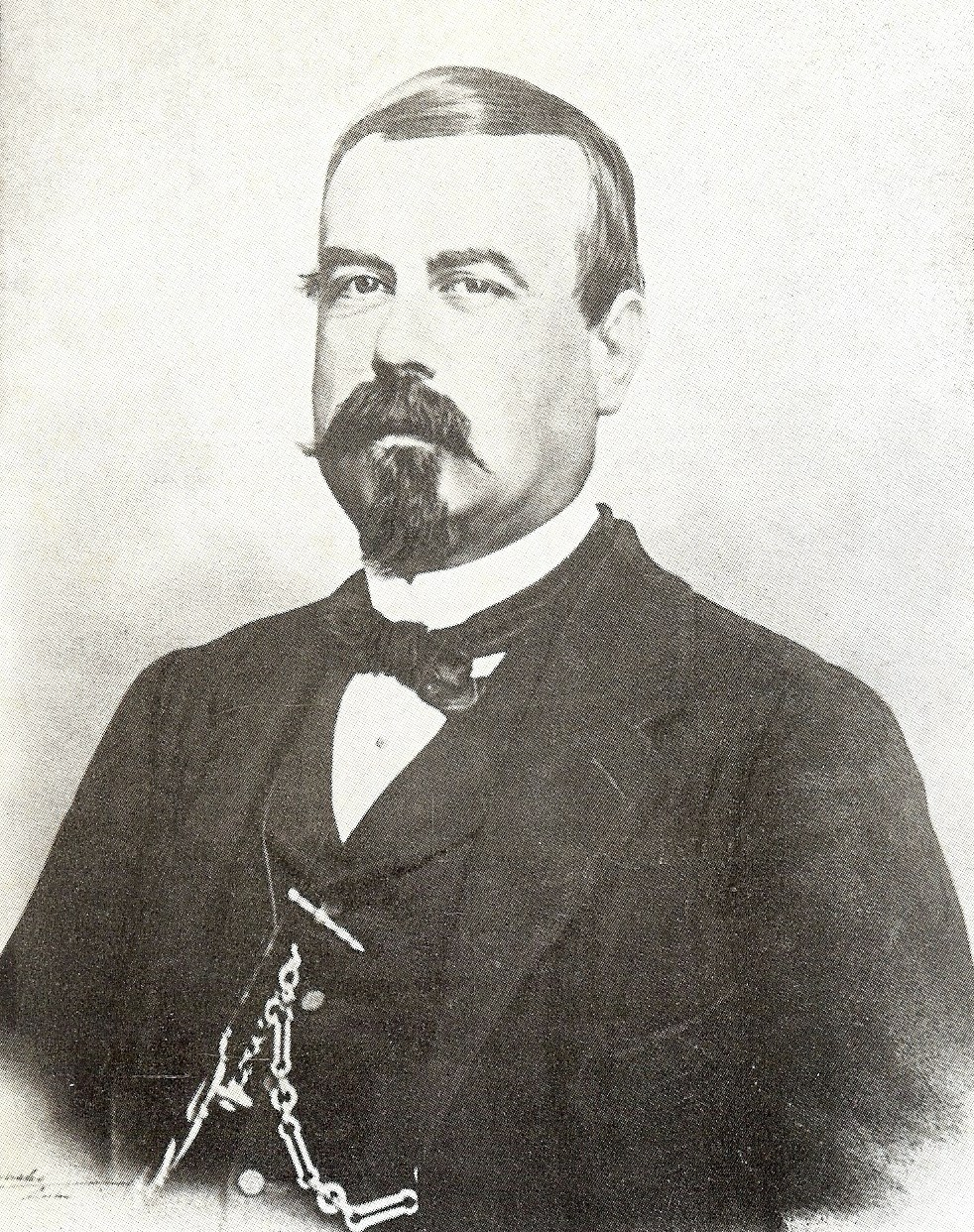
João Carlos de Almeida Carvalho, founder of the paper

After 30 months and 131 issues the Setubalense was forced to close. On 27 December 1857 it said farewell to its readers with the following:

Sincere and fervent defenders of the progress of our country, and of the interests of our land, we have often suffered abuse and arbitrariness, we have censured drowsiness so that we would not fall into torpor and, thus, we have had to go through hardships that we preferred to swallow, rather than betray the sacred duties that we have entrusted to us.

The name was resurrected in 1916. At that time there were already several other newspapers serving Setúbal, including O Elmano, O República, O Trabalho (The Work), and A Mocidade (The Youth). A Propaganda and O Correio do Sado (The News of Sado) were also published that year for the first time. O Setubalense of 1916 was first published on 10 August, as an independent paper that aimed to defend local interests. It appeared twice a week, was written by João Regala and managed by Guilherme Faria. On 14 September, Luís Faria Trindade took over as editor. In June 1918 Trindade was briefly arrested by the government of Sidónio Pais but released without interrogation after having been held overnight. In 1918 it changed its frequency and became known as the "night diary". In August of the same year, Augusto Neves became the editor. He already had journalistic experience and was known as a convinced Republican. A year later O Setubalense started to come out as a triweekly. The paper, still with Republican principles, was closed down on 5 February 1927 by the Estado Novo dictatorship, having been given a 15-day suspension for publishing without first seeking approval of the censors. Trindade was arrested and held in prison for five months without ever being charged. In August 1927, it returned to the newspaper stands, with the subtitle Diário Republicano da Noite (Republican Evening Diary), which would continue to be used until 1938 when Domingos Tavares Roque became editor. In 1931, Rua de S. Julião in Setúbal was renamed as Rua do Diário O Setubalense.

On 2 January 1945, the header of the newspaper began to name Diniz Bordalo-Pinheiro as director, with Domingos Tavares Roque as editor. The paper had briefly moved to Lisbon in 1944 but this was not a success and it soon returned to Setúbal, where Trindade was once again asked to play a role. On Bordalo-Pinheiro's death, he was replaced by his son, Carlos, who was in charge of the paper during the April 1974 Carnation Revolution that overthrew the Estado Novo. In the subsequent and often confusing revolutionary context, the paper would reflect the great political disputes that were taking place in the country and, particularly, in Setúbal. Its support for the revolutionary process was unequivocal, but it gradually came under criticism from both its workers and the people of Setúbal for its support for the social democratic line rather than the more revolutionary approach of many in the area. However, on 20 October of the following year, the name of the director was mentioned for the last time and, two days later, the paper stated: "This edition is the responsibility of the workers". On 25 November 1975 there was a military coup, which would eventually lead to representative democracy in the country. O Setubalense opposed the coup and its headline on the 26th was "Arms to the people, now". Its facilities were occupied by the army and some of its employees arrested and interrogated.

A short film was published in 1976 about the disputes within the paper, entitled Um Jornal Regional em Autogestão: o Setubalense (A regional paper under self-management). After January 1976, the paper was published as Nova Vida (New Life) under the direction of Joaquim Casimiro Madeira. The name O Setubalense would return to readers, three times a week, on February 16, 1981, again under the control of Carlos Bordalo-Pinheiro, who published it until 1995. Ownership was then taken over by a company called Plurijornal, with the paper being directed by members of the Fidalgo family. It ceased publication on 10 May 2013 as a result of Plurijornal's bankruptcy, which it attributed to a steep decline in sales of O Setubalense. On 22 February 2014, O Setubalense returned to newsstands, directed by João Abreu. In August 2018 it merged with the Diário da Região, a paper serving the broader Setúbal District, and then became a daily paper. In 2020 it ran into further difficulties as a result of the COVID-19 pandemic, and sought crowdfunding to ensure its survival. Nevertheless, the paper continued to publish.
