= Eurídice Pereira =

Portuguese politician

Deputy in the Portuguese Assembly of the Republic
- Incumbent
- Assumed office 2009
- Constituency: Setúbal

Civil governor of Setúbal District
- In office September 2007 – August 2009

Personal details
- Born: Eurídice Maria de Sousa Pereira; 20 October 1962 (age 63) Portugal
- Party: Portuguese: Socialist Party (PS)
- Spouse: Divorced
- Education: NOVA University of Lisbon
- Occupation: Politician and administrator

Eurídice Pereira (born 1962) is a Portuguese politician who was trained in sociology. As a member of the Portuguese Socialist Party (PS), she was first elected as a deputy in the Portuguese Assembly of the Republic in 2009, representing Setúbal, and has been re-elected in every national election since then, including the most recent in January 2022. She has also held many other administrative and political positions.

== Early life and education ==
Eurídice Maria de Sousa Pereira was born on 20 October 1962 in the municipality of Moita in the Setúbal District of Portugal, where she still lives. She obtained a degree in sociology from the NOVA University of Lisbon, specializing in administrative modernization and local authorities.

== Career ==
Pereira began her career as the coordinator of professional internships at the Setúbal municipality and then became an advisor on social services. She then became head of the administrative modernization division at the Setúbal municipality, before becoming first deputy chief of staff and then chief of staff. She also carried out administrative roles in the neighbouring Barreiro municipality between 2003 and 2007. In December 2005, she was appointed vice-president of the Lisbon and Tagus Valley Regional Coordination and Development Commission, leaving this post in September 2007 to become the civil governor of Setúbal District. Pereira left that position in August 2009 in order to be a candidate for the Portuguese parliament.

== Political career ==
Pereira was a member of the Moita parish assembly from 1989 to 1993 and a member of the municipal assembly of Moita from 1989 to 2005 and, again, from 2017 to 2021. She was also a member of the Lisbon metropolitan area assembly from 1994 to 1998. In the 2009 Portuguese legislative election she was elected to the National Assembly on the PS list for Setúbal and was re-elected in 2011, 2015, 2019 and 2022. In January 2022 she was third on the PS list for the constituency, with the party winning ten of the 18 seats available for Setúbal and a majority nationally. In the National Assembly she has been president of the administrative council of the Assembly and has sat on the committee on Public Administration, Administrative Modernization, Decentralization and Local Power.
