= Sandra Cunha =

Portuguese politician from the Left Bloc group

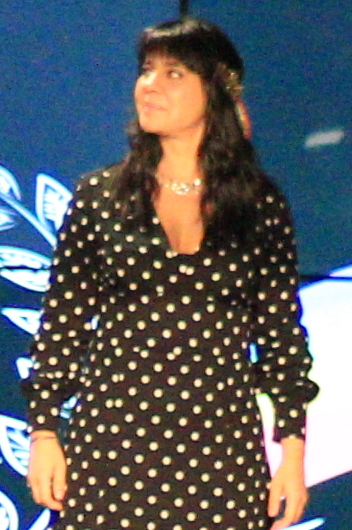
- Cunha in 2019

Member of the Assembly of the Republic of Portugal
- In office 2015–2021
- Parliamentary group: Left Bloc
- Constituency: Setúbal

Personal details
- Born: Sandra Mestre da Cunha; 21 October 1972 (age 53) Paris, France
- Party: Portuguese: Left Bloc (BE)
- Children: One adopted daughter
- Education: ISCTE, Lisbon
- Occupation: Politician; University professor

Sandra Cunha (born 21 October 1972) was a deputy in the Portuguese Assembly of the Republic as a member of the Bloco de Esquerda (Left Bloc - BE). She resigned in April 2021. Before joining parliament, Cunha was a part-time assistant professor at the Instituto Superior de Economia e Gestão (Lisbon School of Economics and Management - ISEG). As a lesbian, Cunha was among the winners of Portugal's Arco-íris (Rainbow) award in 2018 in the category "Coming Out".

== Education ==
Sandra Mestre da Cunha was born in Paris on 21 October 1972. Her parents emigrated from Portugal during the time of the authoritarian Estado Novo regime. The family returned to Portugal four years after the Carnation Revolution in 1974 led to the overthrow of that regime. Between 2000 and 2005 she studied sociology as an undergraduate at the ISCTE – University Institute of Lisbon. Staying at ISCTE she did a postgraduate degree on family and society and followed this with a further postgraduate course on data analysis for social sciences (SPSS). Still at ISCTE, she completed a PhD in sociology in 2013, while also studying children in adverse life situations and social work with children at risk and their families, at the University of Gothenburg in Sweden. In 2019 Cunha started a PhD in gender studies at NOVA FCSH, a consortium of the Institute of Social and Political Sciences at the University of Lisbon and the School of Law at NOVA University Lisbon.

== Career ==
Cunha worked as a research assistant while studying at ISCTE. She also volunteered for an NGO, Meninos do Mundo (Children of the World). In 2013 she worked as a parliamentary assistant for the Left Bloc. In 2013–2016, she worked as an assistant professor at ISEG (Lisbon). She has been focusing most of her political and academic work on gender equality. Professionally, she is also an expert on data analysis.

== Political career ==
Cunha was elected to the Assembly of the Republic in 2015 as a member of the Left Bloc list for the Setúbal constituency. The Left Bloc was formed in 1999 by an agreement of the Marxist People's Democratic Union, Trotskyist Revolutionary Socialist Party, and the democratic socialist Politics XXI to work together. In parliament she was a member of the Committee on Constitutional Affairs, Rights, Freedoms and Guarantees, the Committee for Equality and Non-Discrimination and the Parliamentary Group on Population and Development. In debates her areas of particular interest were adoption by same-sex couples, gender self-determination, combating domestic violence, and children in domestic violence.

Cunha resigned from the Assembly in April 2021 following a request for her parliamentary immunity to be lifted. She was one of eight parliamentarians who was accused of providing false information about their addresses, thereby allegedly benefitting from higher expense reimbursements for transport, etc. She indicated that she had chosen to resign in order that she could clear her name and so that the allegations against her would not become a weapon used against her party.

== Personal life ==
In the early 1990s, Cunha lived in Paris in a relationship "disguised as friendship". She argued that by then it was harder for LGBT people to feel included. Back in Lisbon, she adopted a daughter. One of her first acts as a parliamentarian was to support a bill to permit adoption by same-sex couples. In an article published in Vogue, she said LGBT people still face prejudice and homophobia. She focused most of her parliamentary work on this area and on violence against women.

== Awards ==
- 2018. Prémio Arco-Íris (Rainbow prize), for "Coming Out". The Rainbow prizes are given annually by the Lesbian, Gay, Bisexual, Trans and Intersexual Association (Associação ILGA Portugal).
