= Maria Castello Branco =

Portuguese political commentator

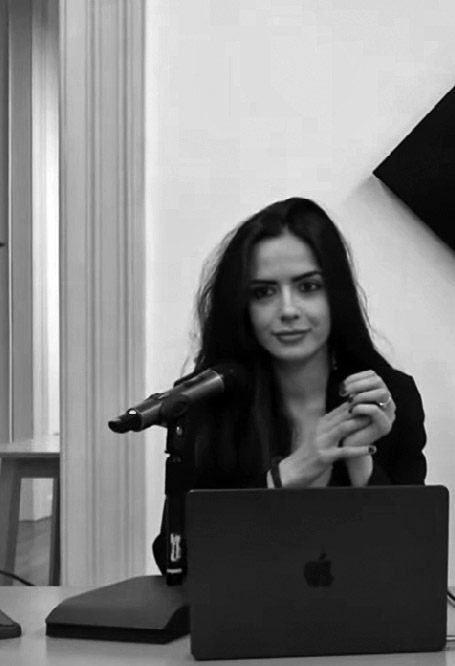
- Maria em 2026
- Born: 20 April 1999 (age 27); Lisbon; Portugal
- Education: London School of Economics
- Occupations: Politic analyst, podcaster, tv presenter

Maria Castello Branco (born in Lisbon on 20 April 1999) is a Portuguese political commentator and analyst. She is a columnist for the newspaper Expresso, and a commentator on RTP1 and RTP Notícias. She presented the Sunday night program, Dez Programas Para o Fim do Mundo, on RTP2 from 2025 until January 2026.

== Education ==
Maria Castello Branco holds a degree in Political Science and International Relations from the Catholic University of Lisbon. She later obtained a master's degree in Political Theory from the London School of Economics (LSE), where she specialized in Chinese Political Philosophy.

== Career ==
She was a columnist for Diário de Notícias, and is currently a weekly columnist for Expresso, where she writes about national and international politics.

She worked as a Public Affairs consultant at Political Intelligence, where she worked on communication strategies and public policies, advising clients on regulatory and institutional relations issues.

In 2024, together with Susana Peralta and Joana Mortágua, she edited, as coordinator, the book Reflections on Freedom, which contains texts by various figures from public Portuguese society and one by herself entitled "Woman, witch, another".

On 6 February 2026, she joined the panel of Natália Carvalho's radio program, Contraditório, on Antena 1, dedicated to debating the major themes of each week and the figures that marked it.

She is a member of the Expresso podcast "Lei da Paridade" (Parity Law), dedicated to political analysis and gender equality issues, distinguishing itself as the only political analysis podcast made exclusively by young women. In the trio that presents the podcast, she is nicknamed "the tarot liberal".

=== Television ===
She began television commentary on SIC Notícias, later moving to CNN Portugal, where she remained until December 2025. At CNN, she participated in political analysis programs, being a resident commentator on the programs À segunda vista and Contra poder and the segment "3 minuts", a visual chronicle space.

In November 2025, she debuted on RTP2 with Dez Programas Para o Fim do Mundo, where, alternately, Maria Castello Branco and Nuno Artur Silva converse with guests of their generation on topics of contemporary cultural life.

On 1 January 2026, she debuted in political commentary on the prime-time news program of RTP1 and joined the RTP Notícias commentary team as a political analyst. She provided daily analysis on RTP Notícias with Manuel Carvalho, covering the election campaigns during the two rounds of the 2026 Portuguese presidential election.

=== Political activity ===
Maria was a member of the leadership of the Liberal Initiative for two years and, at the age of 20, ran for parliament in the 2019 legislative and European elections for the same party. She left the party and its activities at the end of 2021.

== Personal life ==
She identifies as a feminist and she is openly homosexual, talking about these topics in various interviews. Maria is a tarot and witches enthusiast.

== Publications ==
- 2024 – Reflections on Freedom – Identities and Families (coordination), Oficina do Livro

In addition to coordination, she collaborated on the text: Woman, witch, other.
