= Ricardo Reis (politician) =

Portuguese politician (born 1999)

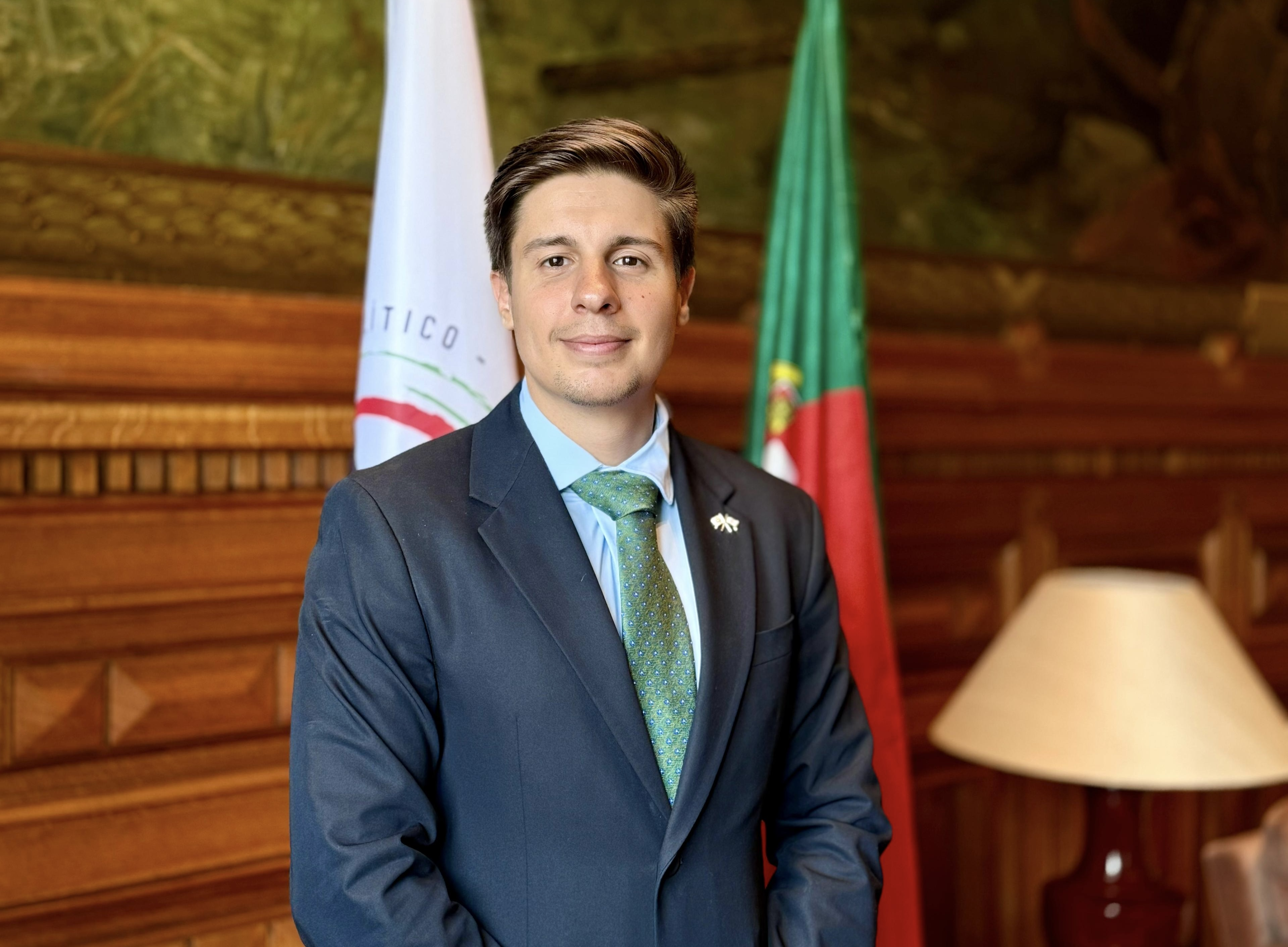
- Reis in 2025

Member of the Assembly of the Republic
- Incumbent
- Assumed office 3 June 2025
- Constituency: Setúbal

Personal details
- Born: 23 August 1999 (age 26)
- Party: Chega

Ricardo Lopes Reis (born 23 August 1999) is a Portuguese politician serving as a member of the Assembly of the Republic since 2025. During the 16th legislature, he served as advisor to the culture, communication, youth, and sports committees and the inquiry committee into the case of the Portuguese-Brazilian twins.
