= Daniel Teixeira (politician) =

Portuguese politician (born 1995)

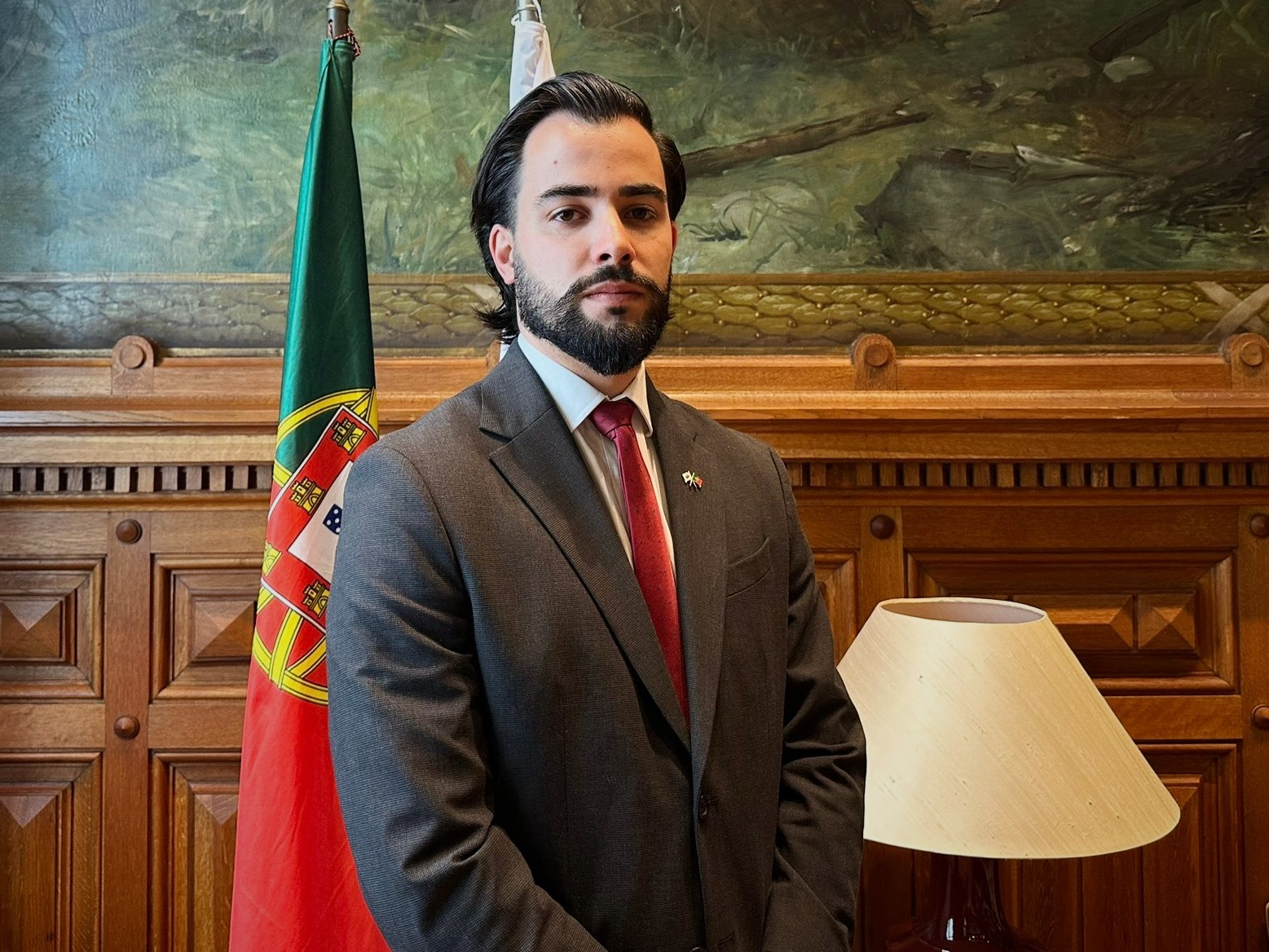
- Teixeira in 2024

Member of the Assembly of the Republic
- Incumbent
- Assumed office 26 March 2024
- Constituency: Setúbal

Personal details
- Born: 5 November 1995 (age 30)
- Party: Chega

Daniel Madeira Caetano Teixeira (born 5 November 1995) is a Portuguese politician of Chega. Since 2024, he has been a member of the Assembly of the Republic. He is a student at the Catholic University of Portugal and a member of the Foursquare Church.
