= Camilo Mortágua =

Portuguese anti-fascist activist (1934–2024)

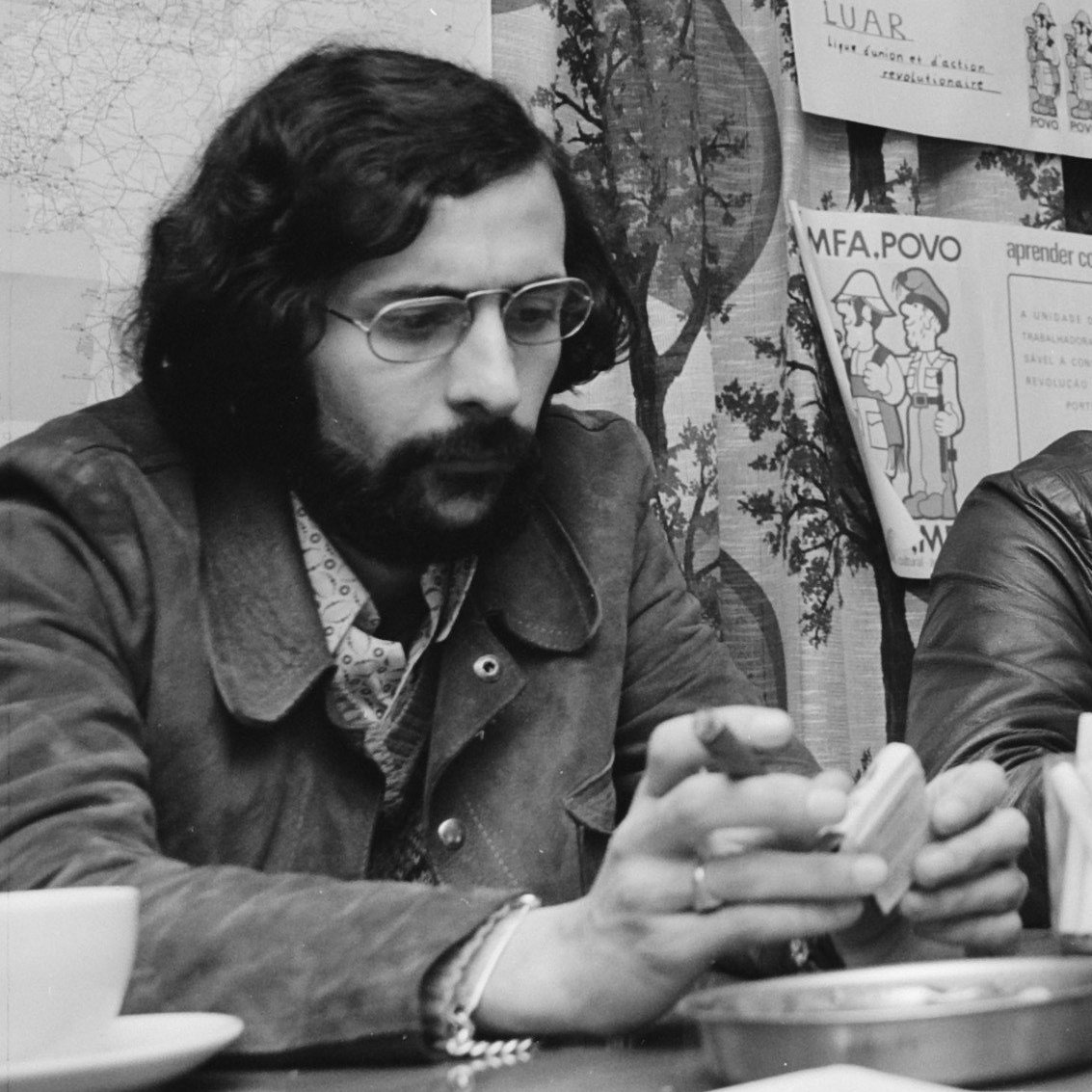
- Mortágua in 1975
- Born: Camilo Tavares Mortágua; 29 January 1934; Oliveira de Azeméis, Portugal
- Died: 1 November 2024 (aged 90); Alvito, Portugal
- Occupation: Activist

Camilo Tavares Mortágua (29 January 1934 – 1 November 2024) was a Portuguese anti-fascist activist and revolutionary. He was a member of the League of Unity and Armed Revolution and was a Grand Officer of the Order of Liberty.

== Biography ==
Born in Oliveira de Azeméis on 29 January 1934, Mortágua's family moved to Lisbon at the age of 12. In 1951, his family emigrated to Venezuela. In 1961, he took part in one of the most prolific terrorist acts against the Estado Novo regime, Operation Dulcineia, in which rebels seized control of a Portuguese passenger ship, led by General Humberto Delgado. On 10 November 1961, he hijacked a TAP Air Portugal plane along with Hermínio da Palma Inácio and other collaborators with the goal of flying over Lisbon at a low altitude and dropping leaflets against the regime. On 17 May 1967, he participated in a heist on a Banco de Portugal branch in Figueira da Foz. The heist had a goal of financing revolutionary activities against António de Oliveira Salazar. Following the Carnation Revolution, he was decorated as a Grand Officer of the Order of Liberty by President Jorge Sampaio.

Mortágua was the father of Assembly of the Republic members Mariana Mortágua and Joana Mortágua. He died in Alvito on 1 November 2024, at the age of 90.
