= Paulo Muacho =

Portuguese politician (born 1990)

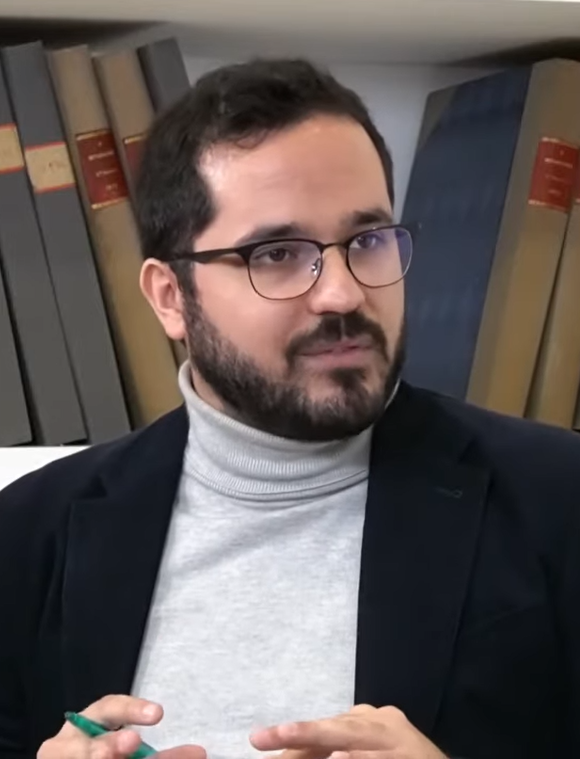
- Muacho in 2022

Member of the Assembly of the Republic
- Incumbent
- Assumed office 26 March 2024
- Constituency: Setúbal

Member of Lisbon City Council
- In office 2017–2021

Personal details
- Born: Paulo Jorge Velez Muacho; 14 July 1990 (age 36) Campo Maior, Portugal
- Party: LIVRE
- Occupation: Lawyer

Paulo Jorge Velez Muacho (born 14 July 1990) is a Portuguese lawyer, politician and member of the Assembly of the Republic, the national legislature of Portugal. A member of the LIVRE party, he has represented Setúbal since March 2024.

== Early life ==
Muacho was born on 14 July 1990 in Campo Maior. He grew up in Seixal on the south bank of the Tagus. He has a degree in law. He also has a master's degree in law.

== Career ==
Muacho is a practicing lawyer.

Muacho joined LIVRE in 2014 shortly after its formation and has been a part of the Contact Group, the party's executive body, from 2015 to 2020 and since 2022. He was a member of Lisbon Municipal Assembly from 2017 to 2021. He is currently working as coordinator for the LIVRE group on Lisbon City Council. At the 2015 legislative election Muacho was placed tenth on LIVRE's list of candidates in Setúbal but the party failed to win any seats in the constituency. At the 2019 legislative election he was placed fourth on LIVRE's list of candidates in Lisbon but the party only won a single seat in the constituency. At the 2022 legislative election he was placed first on LIVRE's list of candidates in Setúbal but the party failed to win any seats in the constituency. He was elected to the Assembly of the Republic at the 2024 legislative election.

== Electoral history ==
Year	Election	Office	Party	Pos.	Votes		#	Status	Notes	Ref.
Year	Election	Office	Party	Pos.	Total	%	#	Status	Notes	Ref.
2015	Legislative election in Setúbal	Assembly of the Republic	L/TDA	10/18	4,277	1.01 / 100.00	7th	Not elected		
2017	Local election in Lisbon	Municipal Assembly	PS	5/51	95,064	37.66 / 100.00	1st	Elected	Ran under the PS lists. Served his term as an independent.	
2019	Legislative election in Lisbon	Assembly of the Republic	L	4/48	22,807	2.07 / 100.00	8th	Not elected		
2021	Local election in Lisbon	Municipal Assembly	More Lisbon (PS.L)	18/51	74,768	30.79 / 100.00	2nd	Not elected		
2022	Legislative election in Setúbal	Assembly of the Republic	L	1/18	6,140	1.42 / 100.00	8th	Not elected		
2024	Legislative election in Setúbal	Assembly of the Republic	L	1/19	21,552	4.29 / 100.00	7th	Elected		
2025	Legislative election in Setúbal	Assembly of the Republic	L	1/19	28,700	5.84 / 100.00	5th	Elected		
