= João Aleixo =

Portuguese politician

João Lopes Aleixo
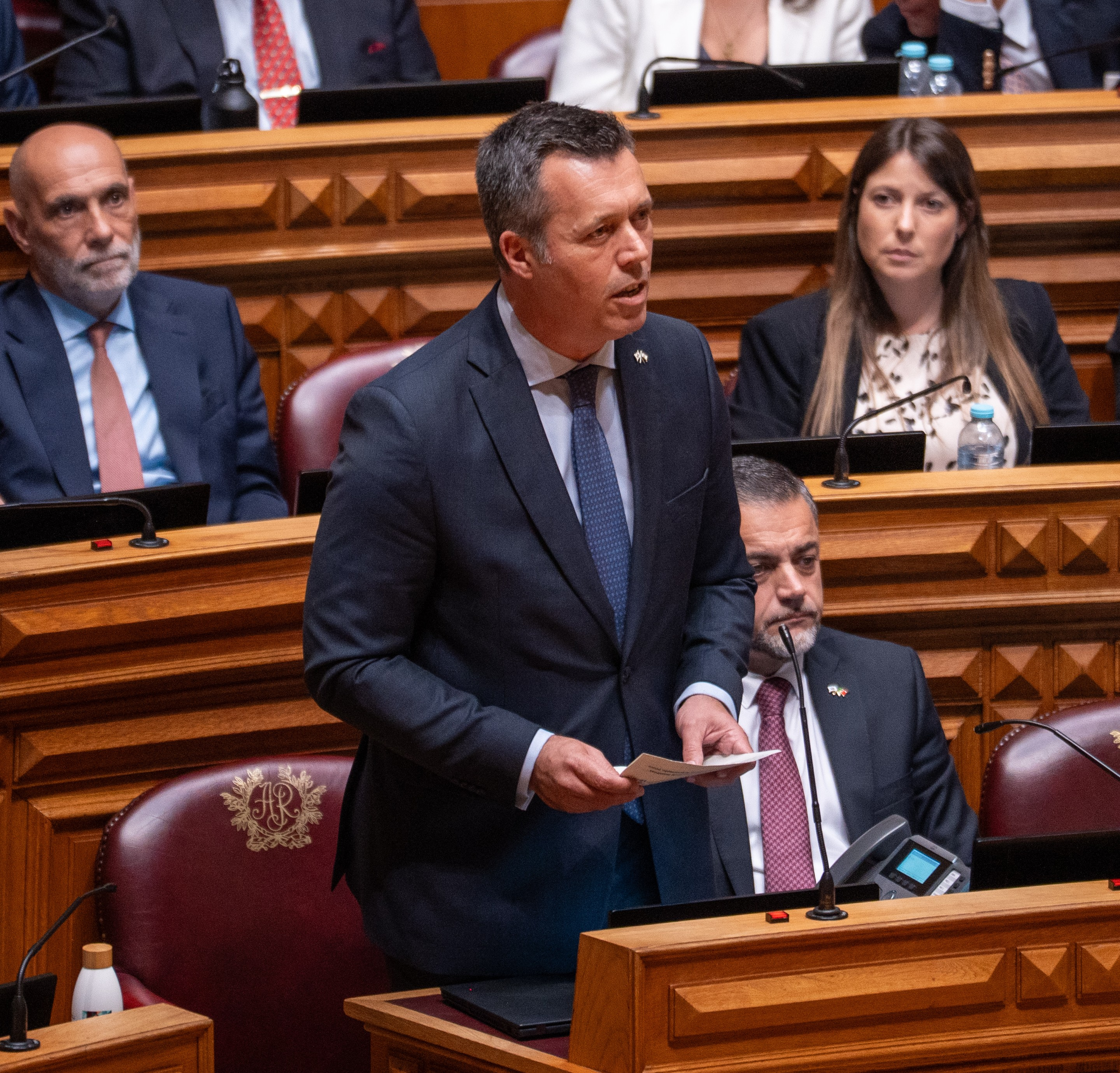
- João Lopes Aleixo in 2025

Member of the Assembly of the Republic
- Incumbent
- Assumed office 3 June 2025
- Constituency: Portalegre

President of the Party Convention and National Council (Chega)
- Incumbent
- Assumed office January 2024

Member of the Municipal Assembly of Lisbon
- In office 10 February 2025 – 11 November 2025

Vice-President of the Party Convention and National Council (Chega)
- In office January 2023 – January 2024

Member of the National Jurisdiction Council (Chega)
- In office May 2021 – January 2023

Member of the Lisbon Municipal Section (Chega)
- In office December 2020 – May 2021

Personal details
- Born: João Ferreira Lopes Aleixo; 4 April 1972 (age 54) Cabeção, Mora, Portugal
- Party: Chega
- Children: 2
- Occupation: Business executive, politician

João Ferreira Lopes Aleixo (born 4 April 1972) is a Portuguese politician and business executive. He has served as a member of the Assembly of the Republic since 3 June 2025, representing the Portalegre constituency for Chega.

He has served as President of the Party Convention and National Council of Chega since 2024, having previously held the position of Vice-President and served as a member of the National Jurisdiction Council. He was a member of the Municipal Assembly of Lisbon between February and November 2025.

Before entering national politics, Lopes Aleixo worked in the marketing, sales and retail sectors. He served as CEO of Laura Varela Mirpuri Holding and as Marketing and Sales Director of Tempus Internacional, the Portuguese representative of the Swatch Group. He founded the consultancy StrategicEdge in 2023.

In the 2025 Portuguese legislative election, he was Chega’s lead candidate in Portalegre, with the party winning 29.90% of the vote in the district. In the 2025 local elections, he ran for Mayor of Portalegre but was not elected.

== Political career ==
Lopes Aleixo joined the political party Chega in late 2019.

=== Party activity ===
He has held several internal leadership positions within Chega:

- President of the Party Convention and National Council (2024–present)
- Vice-President of the Party Convention and National Council (2023–2024)
- Member of the National Jurisdiction Council (2021–2023)
- Member of the Lisbon Municipal Section (2020–2021)

=== Elected offices ===
He was elected to the Assembly of the Republic in the 2025 legislative election as Chega’s lead candidate for the Portalegre constituency.

He served as a member of the Municipal Assembly of Lisbon between February and November 2025.

He ran as Chega’s candidate for Mayor of Portalegre in the 2025 local elections but was not elected.

=== Parliamentary activity ===
During the XVII Legislature, Lopes Aleixo has served as a full member of the Committee on Agriculture and Fisheries and as a substitute member of the Committee on National Defence and the Committee on Environment and Energy.

He was a member of the Temporary Committee for the Verification of Deputies’ Powers until the establishment of the permanent committee with relevant jurisdiction.

He is a member of the Working Group on Former Combatants and Disabled Members of the Armed Forces.

He participates in the Parliamentary Friendship Groups with Germany, Israel, Switzerland and East Timor.

== Election results ==
=== Assembly of the Republic ===
| Year | Election/Constituency | Party | Votes | % of votes | Seats | Position | Change | Ref. |
|---|---|---|---|---|---|---|---|---|
| 2025 | Legislative elections – Portalegre | Chega | 17,220 | 29.90% | 1 (elected) | 1st | +5.31% | |

=== Local elections ===
| Year | Election/Body | Party | Votes | % of votes | Seats | Position | Status/Change | Ref. |
|---|---|---|---|---|---|---|---|---|
| 2021 | Lisbon Municipal Assembly | Chega | 12,996 | 5.35% | 3 | 6th | Took office on 10 February 2025 (replacement) | |
| 2025 | Mayor of Portalegre | Chega | 821 | 6.73% | – | – | Not elected; +4.78% | |
