= Joel Hasse Ferreira =

Portuguese politician (1944–2022)

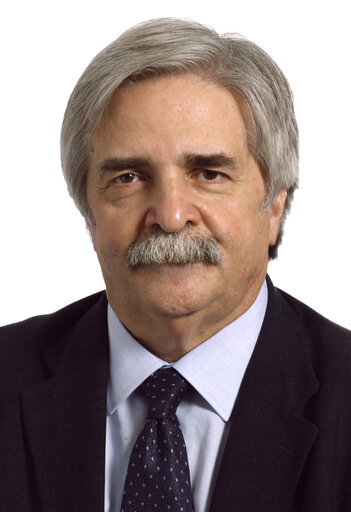
- Official portrait as an MEP, 2004

Member of the European Parliament
- In office 2004–2009

Personal details
- Born: Joel Eduardo Neves Hasse Ferreira; 13 July 1944 Lisbon, Portugal
- Died: 19 March 2022 (aged 77)
- Party: Socialist Party

Joel Eduardo Neves Hasse Ferreira (13 July 1944 – 19 March 2022) was a Portuguese politician and a Member of the European Parliament.

== Biography ==
Hasse Ferreira was born in Lisbon. He was a member of the Socialist Party of Portugal, which was affiliated with the Socialist Group in the European Parliament during his membership as a MEP from 2005 to 2009. He was a member of the Committee on Employment and Social Affairs and the delegation to the EU-Turkey Joint Parliamentary Committee. He was a substitute for the Committee on Budgetary Control, the Committee on the Internal Market and Consumer Protection, the Committee of Inquiry into the collapse of the Equitable Life Assurance Society, the delegation to the EU-Russia Parliamentary Cooperation Committee, and the delegation to the Euro-Mediterranean Parliamentary Assembly.

Joel Hasse Ferreira became a graduate of Lisbon Higher Technical Institute in civil engineering in 1971. In 1987 he became a doctor in management sciences at Jean Moulin University in Lyon. He was a professor at the New University of Lisbon and at the Lusophone University of Humanities and Technologies. He was the Administrator, from 1986 to 1990, and President, from 1990 to 1992, of the public town-planning company of Lisbon. In 2001 and 2002 he was the President of the Institute for the Management of Social Security Capitalisation Funds.

Hasse Ferreira served as a member of the Lisbon Municipal Council from 1982 to 1985, as President of the Sesimbra Municipal Assembly from 1989 to 1993, and as a member of Sesimbra Municipal Council from 1993 to 1997. He served as a Member of the Assembly of the Republic from 1983 to 1985, from 1992 to 2001, and from 2002 to 2005. During his term as a Member of the Assembly, he served as vice-chairman of the Committee on European Affairs. From 1995 to 2001, he also was the Socialist Party coordinator in the Parliamentary Committee on the Economy, Finance and Planning. He was vice-chairman of the Socialist Party parliamentary group from 1996 to 1999. From 2002 to 2005, he was the Socialist Party coordinator for financial affairs in the parliamentary group and the research unit.
