= Joana Mortágua =

Portuguese politician (born 1986)

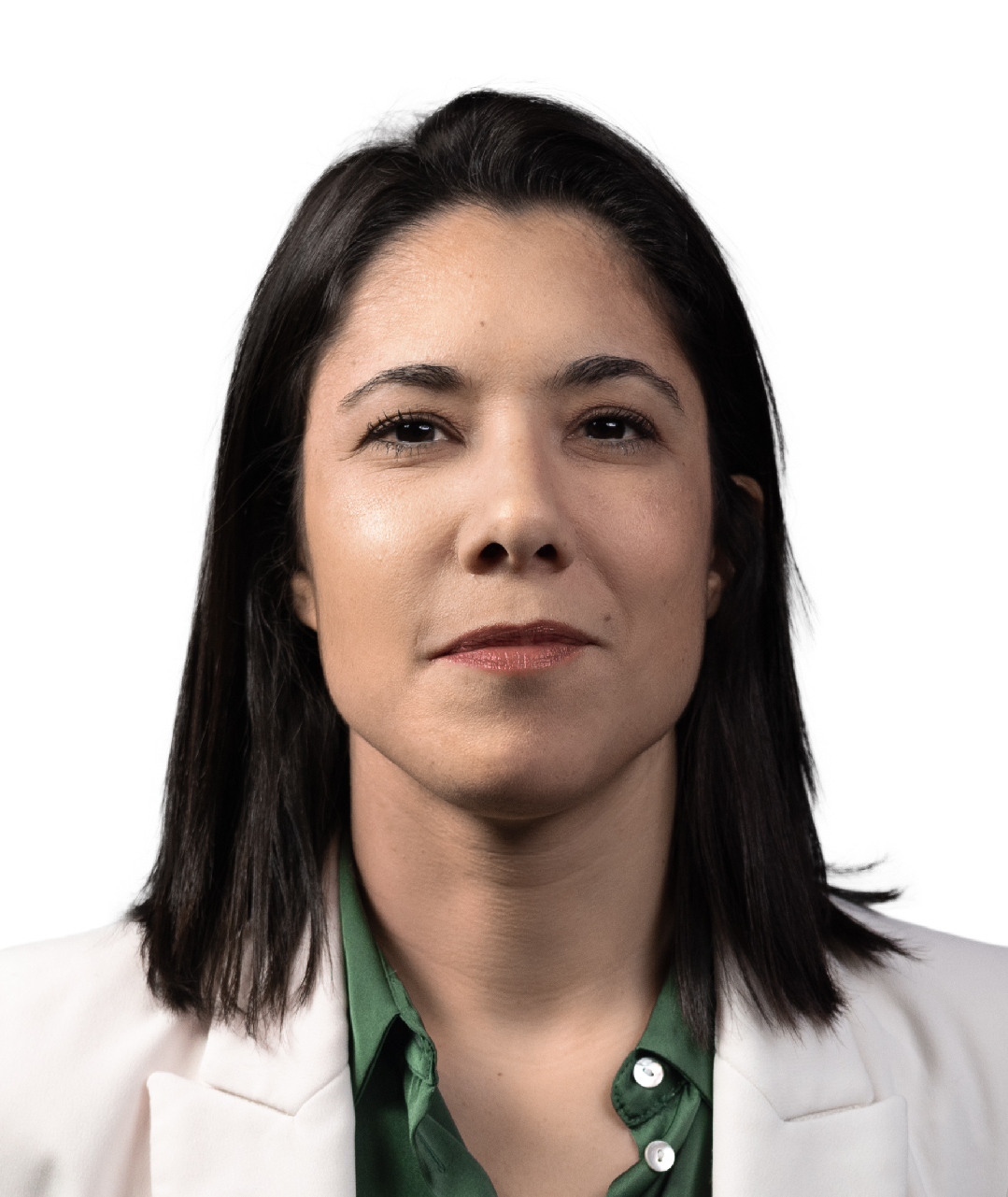
- Mortágua in 2024

Member of the Assembly of the Republic
- In office 4 October 2015 – 18 May 2025
- Constituency: Setúbal

Member of the Almada City Council
- Incumbent
- Assumed office 1 October 2017

Personal details
- Born: Joana Rodrigues Mortágua; 24 June 1986 (age 39) Alvito, Beja, Portugal
- Party: Left Bloc
- Relatives: Mariana Mortágua (twin sister); Maria João Rodrigues (cousin)
- Occupation: Politician

Joana Rodrigues Mortágua (born 24 June 1986) is a Portuguese politician. A member of the Left Bloc (Bloco de Esquerda), she has been a deputy in the Portuguese Assembly of the Republic since 2015, representing Setúbal.

== Early life and education ==
Mortágua was born on 24 June 1986 in Alvito in the Beja District of Portugal. She is the daughter of Camilo Mortágua, an anti-fascist opponent of the Estado Novo regime in Portugal that was overthrown in 1974. Her twin sister, Mariana Mortágua, is also a deputy in the Assembly of the Republic, representing Lisbon. Joana Mortágua has a degree in international relations with a specialization in Latin America, from the Instituto Superior de Ciências Sociais e Políticas (ISCSP) (Institute of Social and Political Sciences) of the University of Lisbon.

== Political involvement ==
Mortágua's political involvement began at the age of 15 when she volunteered for the Associação Justiça e Paz (Association for Justice and Peace), based in Coimbra, an organization that defends human and women's rights. In secondary school, she was the student representative in the school bodies. Later, she was active in various student movements, including the fight against the Bologna Process, a European initiative to ensure comparability in the standards and quality of higher-education qualifications. She worked for the Ernesto Roma Foundation, an organization devoted to combatting diabetes.

Mortágua joined the Left Bloc at the age of 18, and was active in the campaign to decriminalize abortion. She was head of the list of Left Bloc candidates for the Évora constituency in the 2009 Portuguese legislative election but was not elected. In the 2013 municipal elections, she headed the Left Bloc list of candidates for Almada municipality, but was not elected councillor until 2017, being re-elected in 2021.

In 2015 she was elected as a national deputy by the Setúbal constituency, being re-elected in 2019 and in January 2022. The elections in 2022 were called early by the prime minister, António Costa, following the failure of the Left Bloc and the Portuguese Communist Party to support his budget. They proved disappointing for the Left Bloc, which went from having 19 deputies in the Assembly to having only five candidates elected nationally in 2022, including Mortágua and her sister, who was elected for the Lisbon constituency.

In the Assembly of the Republic, Mortágua has coordinated the parliamentary group of the Left Bloc on the Committee on Education, Science, Youth and Sport and has been a member of the Labour and Social Security Committee. She was a member of the negotiating group in 2015 that established the joint position of the Left Bloc and Costa's Socialist Party (PS), paving the way for the formation of a minority government of the PS. She has also been one of the organizers of the Movimento Escola Democrática (Democratic Schools Movement), which promotes cooperative management of the school curriculum that involves the students.

== Publications ==
In 2024, together with Susana Peralta and Maria Castello Branco, she edited, as coordinator, the book Reflections on Freedom, which contains texts by various figures from public portuguese society.
