= Odete Santos =

Portuguese lawyer and politician (1941–2023)

Odete dos Santos GOIH
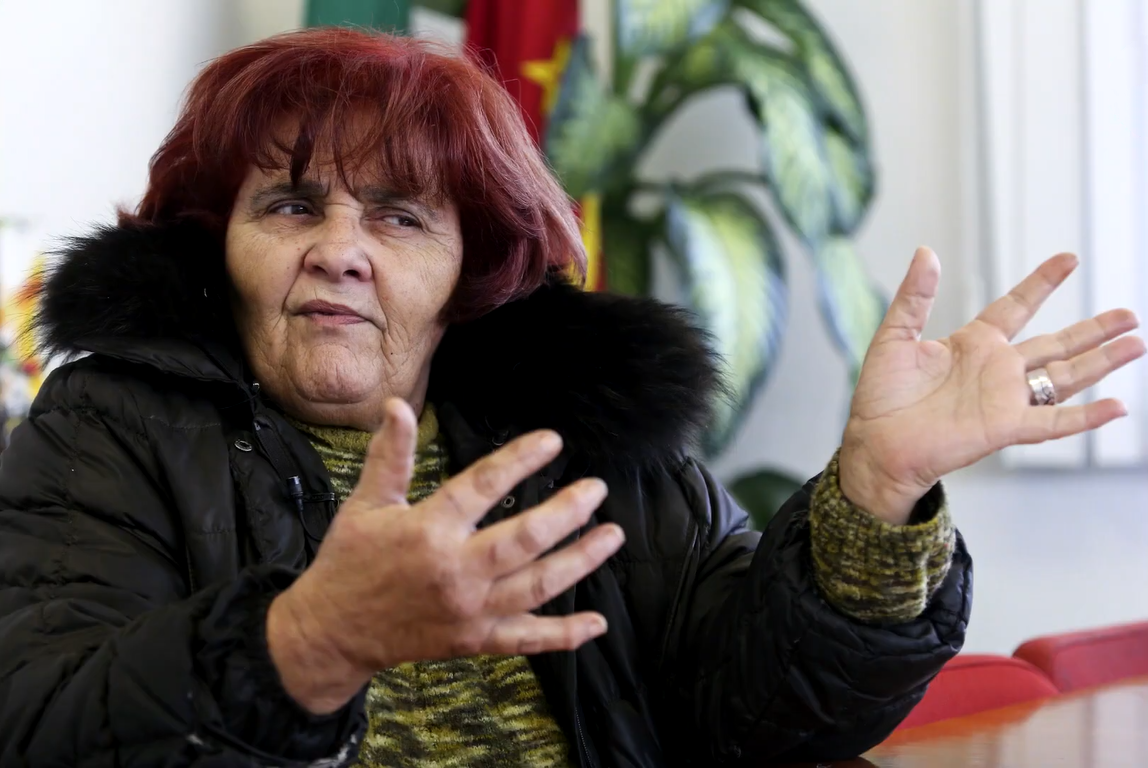

Member of the Assembly of the Republic
- In office 1980–2007
- Parliamentary group: Portuguese Communist Party (PCP)
- Constituency: Setúbal

President of the Municipal Assembly of Setúbal
- In office 2001–2009

Personal details
- Born: Maria Odete dos Santos; 26 April 1941 Guarda, Portugal
- Died: 27 December 2023 (aged 82)
- Party: Portuguese: Portuguese Communist Party (PCP)
- Education: University of Lisbon
- Occupation: Lawyer

Odete Santos GOIH (26 April 1941 – 27 December 2023) was a Portuguese lawyer, amateur actress, and politician who was a deputy in the Assembly of the Republic of Portugal for 27 years.

== Early life ==
Maria Odete dos Santos was born in the small village of Pega, in the municipality of Guarda in the northeast of Portugal, on 26 April 1941. Her parents, José and Adélia dos Santos, were primary school teachers. When she was ten, they transferred to Setúbal so that their daughter could study at a high school as there was at the time no high school in Guarda. She graduated in Law from the Faculty of Law of the University of Lisbon and became a lawyer in Setúbal in 1968, becoming known for providing legal services pro bono, defending women without financial resources or those who faced divorce, discrimination and oppression at work.

== Political activities ==
After the Carnation Revolution of 25 April 1974, which overthrew the authoritarian Estado Novo regime, Santos became part of the first administration of the Setúbal City Council, with responsibility for cultural matters, holding the position until the first municipal elections in 1976. She became a member of the Municipal Assembly of Setúbal in 1979, and was president between 2001 and 2009.

Santos joined the Portuguese Communist Party (PCP) in 1974. In 1980 she was elected to the 2nd Assembly of the Republic, representing the Setúbal constituency, and continued to be a deputy until 2007, winning nine elections. She was known as a vocal supporter of women's rights and played an important role in drafting relevant legislation, including for the promotion of infertility treatment. Santos was also a member of the PCP's Central Committee from 2000 until 2012.

== Acting ==
Santos was an amateur actress and appeared in the theatre as well as on television. She started amateur dramatics at the Teatro Amador de Setúbal. With TAS (Teatro de Animação de Setúbal), she performed in Who's Afraid of Virginia Woolf? by Edward Albee, despite being a parliamentarian at the time. She also appeared in plays by the Portuguese playwright Gil Vicente and by Molière. The plays were performed in Setúbal, while at the Teatro Maria Vitória in Lisbon she performed multiple characters in plays broadcast on television.

== Writing ==
Santos published three books:

- Em Maio há Cerejas (In May there are Cherries), described as a tragicomedy in two acts and an epilogue.
- A Bruxa Hipátia – O Cérebro Tem Sexo? (The Witch Hypatia - Does the Brain Have a Sex?).
- A Argamassa dos Poemas (The Mortar of Poems). A compilation of political poems.

== Death ==
Santos died on 26 December 2023, at the age of 82.

== Honours and awards ==
- In 1998 Santos was made a Grand Officer of the Order of Prince Henry (Portuguese: Ordem do Infante Dom Henrique).
- In 1999 she was awarded the Medal of Honour of the City of Setúbal.
- A celebration of her life was held in Setúbal in 2018.
