= Joana Cordeiro =

Portuguese politician

Joana Rita Madaleno Cordeiro (born on 4 December 1984) is a Portuguese politician and a current member of parliament for the party Liberal Initiative (IL). Outside of politics, she worked as Senior Customer Experience Manager (February 2021 to February 2022) in the insurance sector. Prior to that, she held other management and marketing positions, also in the insurance sector. She was born in Lisbon and grew up between Almada and Seixal, where she currently lives. She stood as an independent candidate for the Liberal Initiative in the 2019 legislative elections and, in the meantime, joined the party and founded the Setúbal and Seixal branches of the party. She became a national councillor for IL and a member of the executive committee of the political party. She has a degree in marketing management and a postgraduate diploma in brand management.
