= Setúbal District =

District of Portugal

District of Setúbal Distrito de Setúbal (Portuguese)
- District
- Coat of arms

- Coordinates: 38°31′27.5″N 8°53′33.4″W
- Country: Portugal
- Region: Lisbon and Alentejo
- Historical province: Estremadura and Baixo Alentejo
- No. of municipalities: 13
- No. of parishes: 60
- Capital: Setúbal

Area
  - Total: 5,064 km^{2} (1,955 sq mi)

Population
  - Total: 887,928
  - Density: 175.3/km^{2} (454.1/sq mi)
- ISO 3166 code: PT-15
- No. of parliamentary representatives: 19

The District of Setúbal (Portuguese: Distrito de Setúbal [sɨˈtuβal]) is a district located in the south-west of Portugal. It is named for its capital, the city of Setúbal.

== Geography ==
It is delimited by Lisbon District and Santarém District on the north, Évora District on the east, Beja District on the south and the Atlantic Ocean on the west. It has a population of 887,928 inhabitants, in an area of 5,064 km^{2} (1,955 sq mi). The district was carved out of Lisbon District in 1926, and is the only Portuguese district created after 1835.

== Municipalities ==
It is composed of 13 municipalities, spread over two sub regions and comprising 60 parishes:

- Península de Setúbal Subregion NUTS II Sub-Region:
  - Alcochete
  - Almada
  - Barreiro
  - Moita
  - Montijo
  - Palmela
  - Seixal
  - Sesimbra
  - Setúbal
- Alentejo Litoral Subregion:
  - Alcácer do Sal
  - Grândola
  - Santiago do Cacém
  - Sines

== List of parliamentary representatives ==
Member	Party
Ana Catarina Mendes	PS
André Pinotes Batista	PS
Bruno Dias	PCP
Eurídice Pereira	PS
Clarisse Campos	PS
Cristina Rodrigues	PAN
Maria da Graça Reis	PS
Fernanda Velez	PSD
Fernando José	PS
Fernando Negrão	PSD
Filipe Pacheco	PS
Francisco Lopes	PCP
Joana Mortágua	BE
José Luís Ferreira	PEV
Maria Antónia de Almeida Santos	PS
Nuno Miguel Carvalho	PSD
Paula Santos	PCP
Sandra Cunha	BE
Sofia Araújo	PS

== Summary of votes and seats won 1976-2022 ==
Summary of election results from Setúbal district, 1976-2022
Parties	%	S	%	S	%	S	%	S	%	S	%	S	%	S	%	S	%	S	%	S	%	S	%	S	%	S	%	S	%	S	%	S
Parties	1976		1979		1980		1983		1985		1987		1991		1995		1999		2002		2005		2009		2011		2015		2019		2022	
PS	32.2	7	21.4	4	23.5	4	30.6	6	16.5	3	17.6	3	28.4	5	44.9	9	43.7	8	39.3	7	43.6	8	34.0	7	26.9	5	34.3	7	38.6	9	45.7	10
PSD	8.4	1	In AD				12.7	2	15.4	3	32.6	6	34.7	6	18.4	3	18.0	3	24.7	5	16.1	3	16.4	3	25.2	5	In PàF		14.4	3	16.2	3
CDS-PP	4.4		In AD				5.1	1	3.8		1.9		2.7		7.2	1	5.6	1	6.9	1	5.1	1	9.1	1	12.1	2	In PàF		3.0		1.1	
PCP/APU/CDU	44.4	9	47.0	9	44.0	9	45.8	8	38.2	7	32.7	7	24.9	5	24.8	4	24.8	5	20.5	4	20.0	3	20.1	4	19.6	4	18.8	4	15.8	3	10.1	2
AD			22.3	4	24.1	4																										
PRD									20.4	4	8.7	1																				
BE																	3.5		4.6		10.3	2	14.0	2	7.1	1	13.1	2	12.1	2	5.8	1
PàF																											22.6	5				
PAN																													4.4	1	2.0	
CHEGA																													1.9		9.0	1
IL																													1.1		5.1	1
Total seats	17												16		17												18					
Source: Comissão Nacional de Eleições
