= António Abreu =

Portuguese engineer and politician

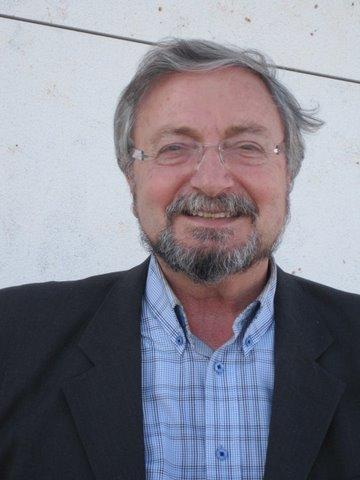
- Abreu
- Born: 6 August 1947 (age 79); Lisbon

António Simões de Abreu, known simply by António Abreu (born 6 August 1947), is a Portuguese engineer and politician.

Abreu holds a Chemical Engineering degree from the Technical Superior Institute and made several post-graduations in management fields. He joined the Portuguese Communist Party in 1969. From 1969 to 1973 he was an active member of the democratic opposition to the Fascist regime of Marcello Caetano, participating in CDE as activist and candidate. He was elected twice as leader of the student association and was persecuted by the political police PIDE. The persecution of the political police took him into underground as a Party permanent. After the Carnation Revolution, in 1974, he developed his political work inside the Union of Communist Students, one of the party's youth organizations at the time. After that he became responsible for the Intellectual sector of the Party and for several local organizations in the Porto District since the Revolution until 1978. After that he was responsible for several party organizations, such as Intellectual Sector, in Lisbon. He later became an alderman in Lisbon, after being elected in a coalition between the Portuguese Communist Party and the Portuguese Socialist Party. He was responsible for Education, Youth and Urban Reestruturation in the City Council (1993-2001). On 14 January 2001, Abreu was the Party's candidate to the Presidential election. António Abreu was member of the Educational National Council (1998-2005) and of RTP Information Council (1980-1987). He was natural parks manager in Sintra and worked in new hospitals projects (2003-2009). He is a consultor dedicated to management of projects.

He is Commander of the Order of Merit by decision of the President of the Portuguese Republic, Jorge Sampaio.

== Electoral history ==
=== Presidential election, 2001 ===
Ballot: 14 January 2001
Candidate	Votes	%
Jorge Sampaio	2,401,015	55.6
Joaquim Ferreira do Amaral	1,498,948	34.7
António Abreu	223,196	5.2
Fernando Rosas	129,840	3.0
Garcia Pereira	68,900	1.6
Blank/Invalid ballots	127,901	–
Turnout	4,449,800	49.71
Source: Comissão Nacional de Eleições
