= Joaquim Ferreira do Amaral =

Portuguese politician

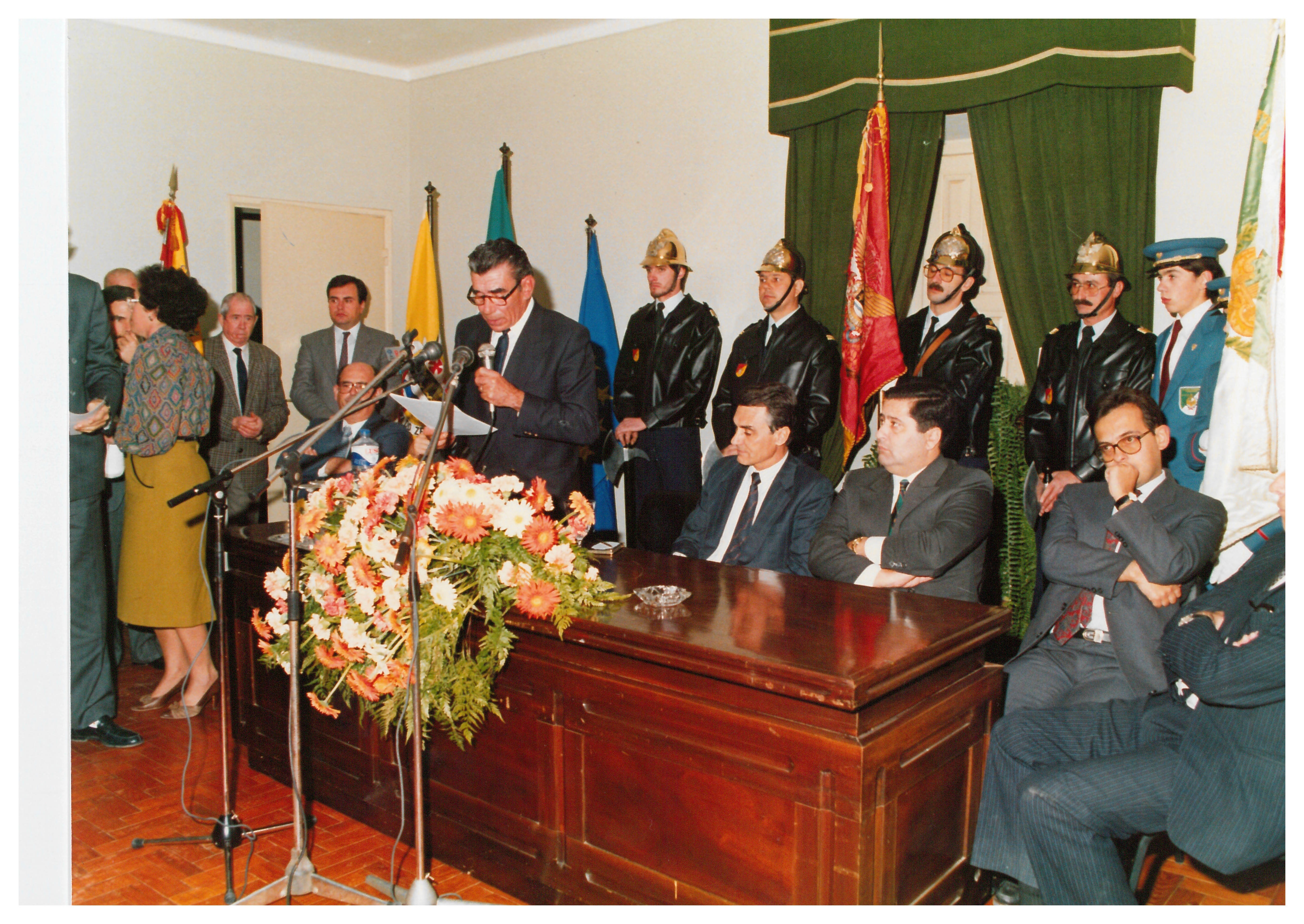

Minister of Public Works, Transport and Communications
- In office 24 April 1990 – 28 October 1995
- Prime Minister: Aníbal Cavaco Silva
- Preceded by: João Maria de Oliveira Martins
- Succeeded by: Henrique Constantino

Minister of Commerce and Tourism
- In office 17 August 1987 – 24 April 1990
- Prime Minister: Aníbal Cavaco Silva
- Preceded by: Fernando Santos Martins
- Succeeded by: Fernando Faria de Oliveira
- In office 17 October 1984 – 6 November 1985
- Prime Minister: Mário Soares
- Preceded by: Álvaro Barreto
- Succeeded by: Fernando Santos Martins

Secretary of State for Tourism
- In office 18 June 1983 – 17 October 1984
- Prime Minister: Mário Soares
- Preceded by: Luís Nandim de Carvalho
- Succeeded by: José Rodrigues Ferraz

Secretary of State for European Integration
- In office 12 January 1981 – 4 September 1981
- Prime Minister: Francisco Pinto Balsemão
- Preceded by: Rui Almeida Mendes
- Succeeded by: Vitor Martins

Secretary of State for Extractive and Manufacturing Industries
- In office 7 August 1979 – 3 January 1980
- Prime Minister: Maria de Lurdes Pintasilgo
- Preceded by: António Cardoso e Cunha
- Succeeded by: Ricardo Bayão Horta

Personal details
- Born: Joaquim Martins Ferreira do Amaral; 13 April 1945 (age 81) Lisbon, Portugal
- Party: Social Democratic
- Education: Instituto Superior Técnico

Joaquim Martins Ferreira do Amaral (born 13 April 1945) is a Portuguese former politician of the Social Democratic Party (PSD).

He was a candidate for Lisbon mayor in the 1997 local elections and lost to incumbent PS mayor João Soares by a 52% to 39% margin. Four years later, he ran for President of the Republic in the 2001 election, taking just under 35% of the vote and losing to incumbent Jorge Sampaio.

He served in the Assembly of the Republic from the seventh to ninth legislatures (1995–2009), first for Lisbon, then Leiria.

As the Minister for Public Works, Transport and Communications he oversaw the construction of the Vasco da Gama Bridge. He later served as the president of Lusoponte, the company that built it.

== Electoral history ==
=== Lisbon City Council election, 1997 ===
Ballot: 14 December 1997
Party	Candidate	Votes	%	Seats	+/−
PS/CDU/UDP	João Soares	165,072	51.9	10	–1
PSD/CDS–PP	Ferreira do Amaral	124,866	39.3	7	+1
PSR/PXXI	Francisco Louçã	8,315	2.6	0	new
PCTP/MRPP	–	6,070	1.9	0	±0
Blank/Invalid ballots		13,799	4.3	–	–
Turnout		318,102	48.29	17	±0
Source: Autárquicas 1997

=== Presidential election, 2001 ===
Ballot: 14 January 2001
Candidate	Votes	%
Jorge Sampaio	2,401,015	55.6
Joaquim Ferreira do Amaral	1,498,948	34.7
António Abreu	223,196	5.2
Fernando Rosas	129,840	3.0
Garcia Pereira	68,900	1.6
Blank/Invalid ballots	127,901	–
Turnout	4,449,800	49.71
Source: Comissão Nacional de Eleições

== Honours ==
=== Portugal ===
- Grand Cross of the Order of Prince Henry (30 January 2006)

=== Other countries ===
- (Netherlands) Grand Cross of the Order of Orange-Nassau (27 September 1991)
- (Brazil) Grand Cross of the Order of the Southern Cross (25 July 1996)
