= Jorge Sampaio =

President of Portugal from 1996 to 2006

His Excellency Jorge Sampaio GColTE GColIH GColL
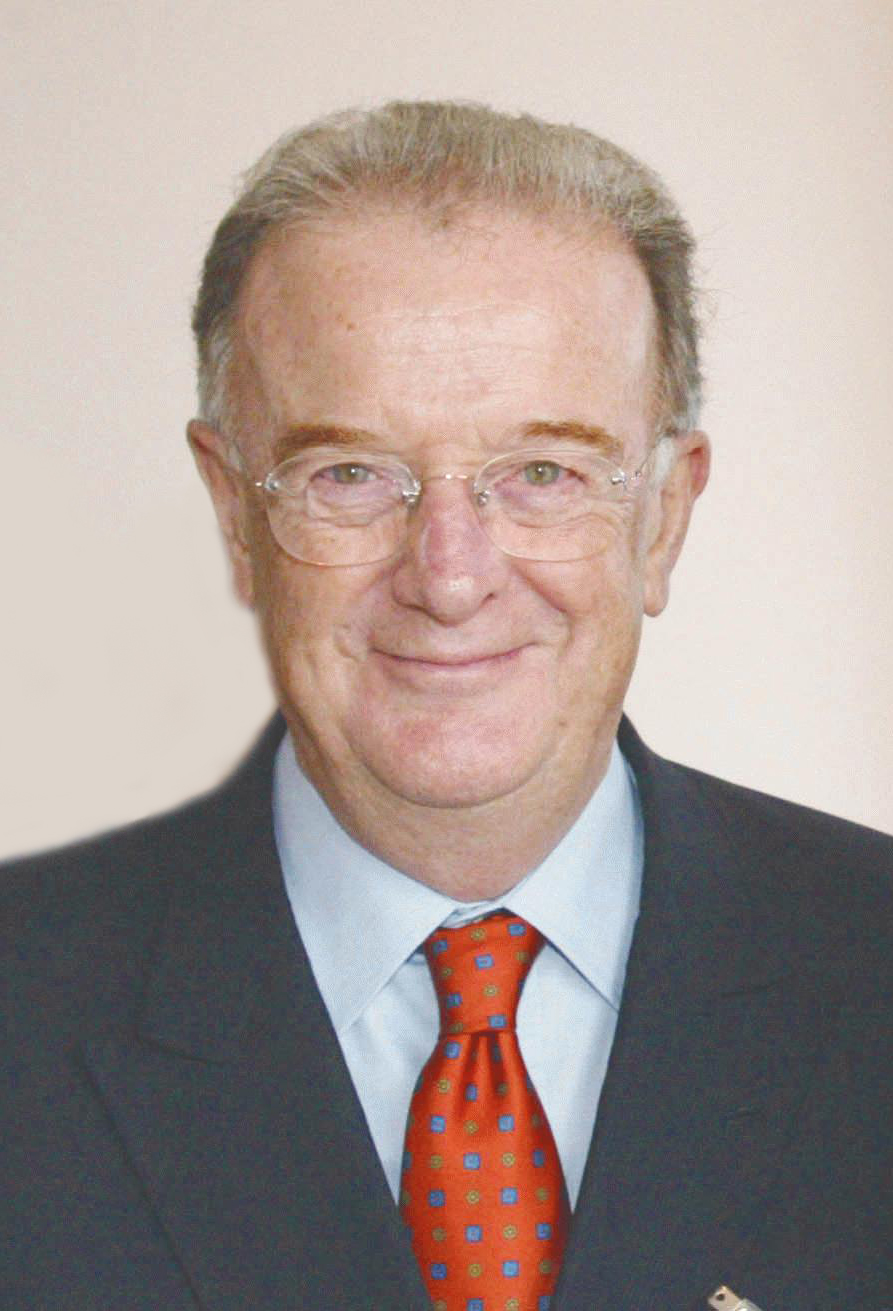
- Sampaio in 2003

President of Portugal
- In office 9 March 1996 – 9 March 2006
- Prime Minister: António Guterres; José Manuel Barroso; Pedro Santana Lopes; José Sócrates
- Preceded by: Mário Soares
- Succeeded by: Aníbal Cavaco Silva

High-Representative for the Alliance of Civilizations
- In office 1 April 2007 – 1 March 2013
- Preceded by: Position established
- Succeeded by: Nassir Abdulaziz Al-Nasser

Mayor of Lisbon
- In office 22 January 1990 – 15 November 1995
- Preceded by: Nuno Krus Abecasis
- Succeeded by: João Soares

Secretary-General of the Socialist Party
- In office 16 January 1989 – 23 February 1992
- President: João Ferraz de Abreu
- Preceded by: Vítor Constâncio
- Succeeded by: António Guterres

Leader of the Opposition
- In office 16 January 1989 – 23 February 1992
- Prime Minister: Aníbal Cavaco Silva
- Preceded by: Vítor Constâncio
- Succeeded by: António Guterres

Member of the Assembly of the Republic
- In office 4 November 1991 – 26 October 1995
- Constituency: Lisbon
- In office 13 August 1987 – 3 November 1991
- Constituency: Santarém
- In office 4 November 1985 – 12 August 1987
- Constituency: Lisbon
- In office 3 June 1976 – 30 May 1983
- Constituency: Lisbon

Personal details
- Born: Jorge Fernando Branco de Sampaio; 18 September 1939 Lisbon, Portugal
- Died: 10 September 2021 (aged 81) Lisbon, Portugal
- Party: Socialist Party (1978–2021)
- Other political affiliations: Movement of Socialist Left (1974)
- Spouse(s): Karin Schmidt Dias (m. 1967; div. 1971) Maria José Rodrigues Ritta (m. 1974)
- Children: Vera Ritta de Sampaio; André Ritta de Sampaio
- Education: University of Lisbon
- Profession: Lawyer
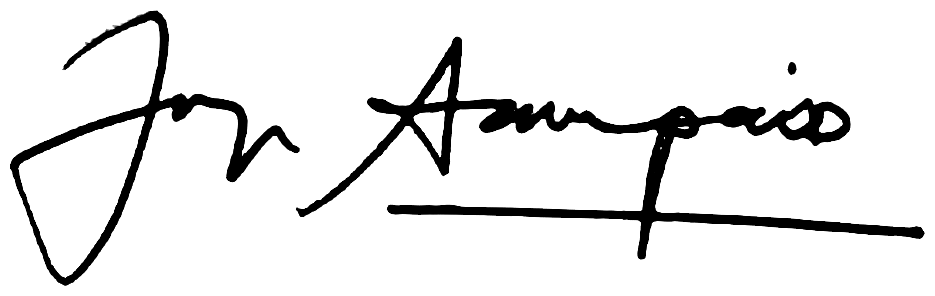
- Signature

Jorge Fernando Branco de Sampaio GColTE GColIH GColL (European Portuguese: [ˈʒɔɾʒɨ sɐ̃ˈpaju]; 18 September 1939 – 10 September 2021) was a Portuguese lawyer and politician who was the president of Portugal from 1996 to 2006. Sampaio was a member of the Socialist Party, a party which he led between 1989 and 1992. He served as the Mayor of Lisbon from 1990 to 1995 and High-Representative for the United Nations' Alliance of Civilizations between 2007 and 2013.

Sampaio was an opponent of the Estado Novo dictatorship, participated in the student movement of the 1960s, and played an active role in the political movements that led to the Carnation Revolution of April 25, 1974. Subsequently, he worked as a lawyer for political prisoners.

As president of Portugal, he used international diplomacy to raise the profile of the cause of Timor-Leste, supported the 1999 referendum and used Portugal's diplomatic channels to champion Timorese freedom during this transition as he sought to foster peace in the country. He was present during the transition and formal independence in 2002, and paid a historic visit to the country in 2000. Sampaio oversaw the handover of Macau to China, after a 442 years of Portuguese rule; two months after his re-election, he was confronted with the collapse of the Entre-os-Rios bridge in March 2001.

== Early life ==
Sampaio was born in born into a liberal middle-class family in Lisbon on 18 September 1939. He was the eldest son of Fernanda Bensaúde Branco (1908-2000), a Lisbon native and private English teacher, and António Arnaldo de Carvalho Sampaio (1908-1984), a native of Guimarães, a physician specializing in Public Health and a major promoter of the National Vaccination Program. The Sampaio family lived in the United States and the United Kingdom for some years due to the professional activity of his father. His maternal grandmother, Sara Bensliman Bensaúde, belonged to a Sephardic family, who came from Morocco and settled in Portugal in the early 19th century. She converted to Catholicism and married Sampaio's maternal grandfather Fernando Augusto Branco (1880–1940), an officer of the Portuguese Navy and Foreign Minister of Portugal. Sampaio's maternal great-granduncle was the businessman José Bensaúde (1835–1922). Sampaio considered himself neither Jewish nor Catholic; he was an agnostic. (Note: Jerusalem Post: I understand that you have Jewish ancestry in your family. What is your personal connection to the Jewish people? Do you consider yourself to be a Jew?.; Jorge Sampaio: My grandmother belonged to a Jewish family that came from Morocco in the beginning of the 19th century. She married a non-Jewish naval officer who later was Foreign Affairs minister. I am naturally very proud of this ancestry and of all those that I call my "favorite Jewish cousins", one of whom is the president of the Lisbon Jewish Community, as I am proud of the ancestry on my non-Jewish father's side. Personally, I am agnostic, and I do not consider myself a Jew; but I am proud, as I said, of my ancestors.)

In an interview for the daily newspaper Público, Sampaio said he recalled his parents "putting tapes on the windows, because it was feared that Hitler would come down that way [to Portugal]". His brother is psychiatrist and academic Daniel Sampaio (born 1946).

Sampaio grew up in a manor house in Sintra. He attended Queen Elizabeth's School in São Bento, Lisbon. In the 1947–1948 school year, the Sampaio family—except Daniel—moved to the United States and settled in Baltimore, where his father taught at Johns Hopkins University. Sampaio enrolled at the YMCA, where he practiced boxing and swimming; he also attended piano lessons at the Peabody Institute and participated in its orchestra. At the end of the school year, Sampaio returned to his aunt's and uncle's house in Lisbon, and soon after to Sintra when his parents returned from the US. In 1949, Jorge Sampaio attempted to enroll at Colégio Militar, but failed, so he enrolled at Liceu Pedro Nunes. After finishing the fifth grade, Sampaio chose a set of subjects that gave him access to the law course at Liceu Passos Manuel.

== Political career ==
Jorge Sampaio started his political career as a student of the Faculty of Law of the University of Lisbon. Sampaio had a key role in student resistance and the 1960s academic crisis protesting against the fascist Estado Novo regime, and led the Lisbon students union between 1960 and 1961. Following his graduation in 1961, Sampaio started a career as a lawyer before entering politics following his father's advice, and often defended political prisoners. After the Carnation Revolution of 25 April 1974, Sampaio took on his first political role when he was tasked with negotiating the release of political prisoners at Fort-prison of Caxias. He was in charge of the defense of the accused in famous cases such as the "Beja Revolt" in 1961, a military-civilian uprising led by opposition figures, including the supporters of General Humberto Delgado, aimed at seizing the military barracks in Beja, an act of resistance against the totalitarian-conservative dictatorship of Salazar (Revolta de Beja), and those arrested 1972 during the Vigília da Capela do Rato protest against the colonial war and the dictatorship. The documents that opposed the exile of Mário Soares, who Sampaio would later succeed in the presidency of the Republic, were in his office. He also worked as a director for the Portuguese Bar Association. In the 1970s, he was a co-founder of Movimento de Esquerda Socialista (MES).

=== Carnation Revolution and political beginnings ===
On 25 April 1974, during the Carnation Revolution, Sampaio was awakened by a friend's telephone call; he went to his office to gather information but returned home when the Armed Forces Movement ordered via radio no-one should leave their homes. Sampaio originated the slogan "25 de Abril, sempre!" ("Always the 25 of April!").

In May 1974, Sampaio co-founded the Movement of Socialist Left ("Movimento de Esquerda Socialista (MES)") but soon after abandoned the political project when, in the first MES congress in December, he strongly opposed its Marxist-Leninist ideology. On 28 September 1974, Sampaio participated in the barricades to prevent the arrival of citizens at a demonstration in support of General António de Spínola, then-president of the Republic, in an act known as the "demonstration of the silent majority".

After the failed communist coup of 25 November 1975, Sampaio founded Intervenção Socialista (IS) (Socialist Intervention) in an attempt to unify the left but with little success. In 1978, IS was absorbed by the Partido Socialista (PS) ("Socialist Party") and Sampaio joined that party, where he was associated with its left-most wing.

Sampaio was first elected to the Assembly of the Republic in the 1979 legislative election as a deputy for Lisbon, an office he successively held until 1991. Between 1979 and 1984, Sampaio was the first Portuguese member of the European Commission for Human Rights of the Council of Europe. Between 1987 and 1988, he was president of the parliamentary bench of the PS. On 18 November 1988, Jorge Sampaio became a candidate for Secretary-General of the PS, and on 16 January 1989, after defeating Jaime Gama, he succeeded Vítor Constâncio, who resigned. Sampaio led the PS until 1992, when António Guterres defeated him by winning the primaries, after being presented as an alternative following the party's poor results in the 1991 legislative election.

=== Mayor of Lisbon ===
Also in 1989, Sampaio was elected the 62nd Mayor of Lisbon with a left-wing coalition the PS led after winning 49.1% of the vote against PSD candidate Marcelo Rebelo de Sousa. This alliance was the first between the PS and the Portuguese Communist Party (PCP) after the Carnation Revolution, and was joined by the PEV, the UDP, the MDP/CDE and the PSR, and inaugurated a policy of municipal alliances with the PCP at Sampaio's initiative, which the PS did not support.

Sampaio's mandate as mayor of Lisbon saw the conclusion of the Plano Estratégico e do Plano Diretor Municipal (PDM) and of the Plano Especial de Realojamento (PER), the consolidation and inauguration of Lisbon as European Capital of Culture in 1994, the reconstruction of Chiado district that burned down in 1988, and the opening of the Chiado and Music museums.

Sampaio was re-elected for a second term as mayor in 1993. In February 1995, he announced his intention to run for the following year's presidential election, which he confirmed in July. Due to his candidacy, Sampaio resigned from his mayoral post and was succeeded by João Soares on 15 November, the day he presented his candidacy before the Constitutional Court.

== Presidency (1996–2006) ==
=== First term: 1996–2001 ===
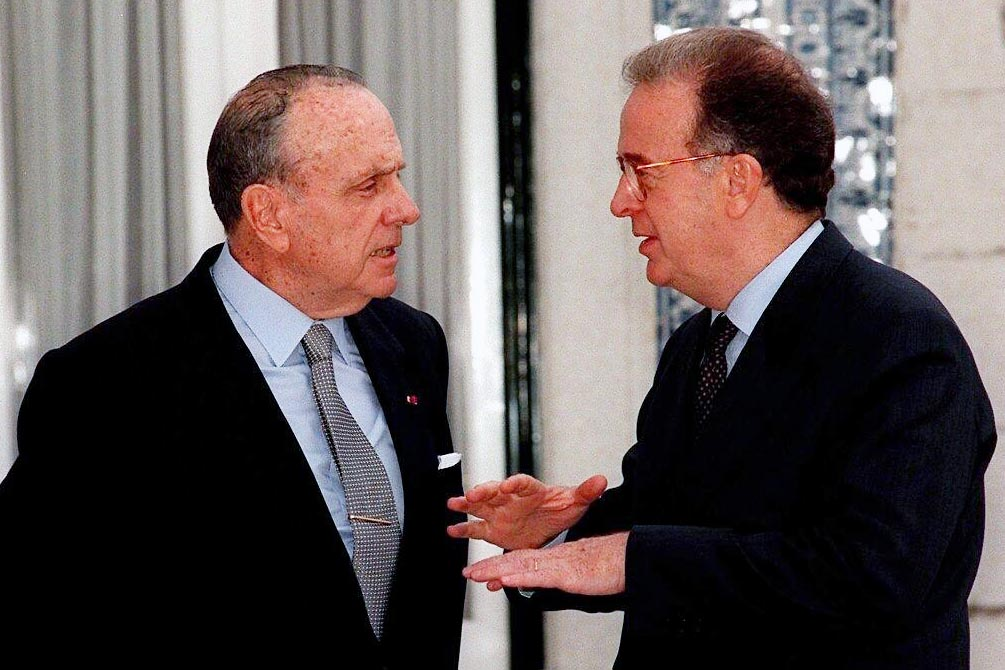
President Sampaio with Galician Regional President Manuel Fraga, 1996.

The electoral campaign began on 31 December 1995; throughout the campaign, polls favored Sampaio over the other candidate, former Prime Minister Aníbal Cavaco Silva. Sampaio won the election with 3,035,056 votes (52.66%) and was sworn in on 9 March 1996 in a ceremony at the Assembly of the Republic, succeeding Mário Soares. There was also a historic coincidence: it was the first time the sitting president and prime minister were members of the same political party.

On 13 April, Sampaio was admitted to Lisboan Santa Cruz hospital to undergo heart surgery and was discharged 12 days later. On 27 July, he was again admitted to the hospital for open heart surgery. Due to this, Sampaio requested leave for a temporary impediment at the Constitutional Court; it was the first-such incident. Sampaio was replaced by the President of the Assembly Almeida Santos.

On 19 May 1996, during the 1996 Taça de Portugal Final at Estádio Nacional, a S. L. Benfica cheerleader launched a rocket that killed a Sporting CP fan. Sampaio called for an emergency meeting at halftime in which he tried to cancel the second half of the match. In May 1998, Sampaio inaugurated Expo '98 in Lisbon.

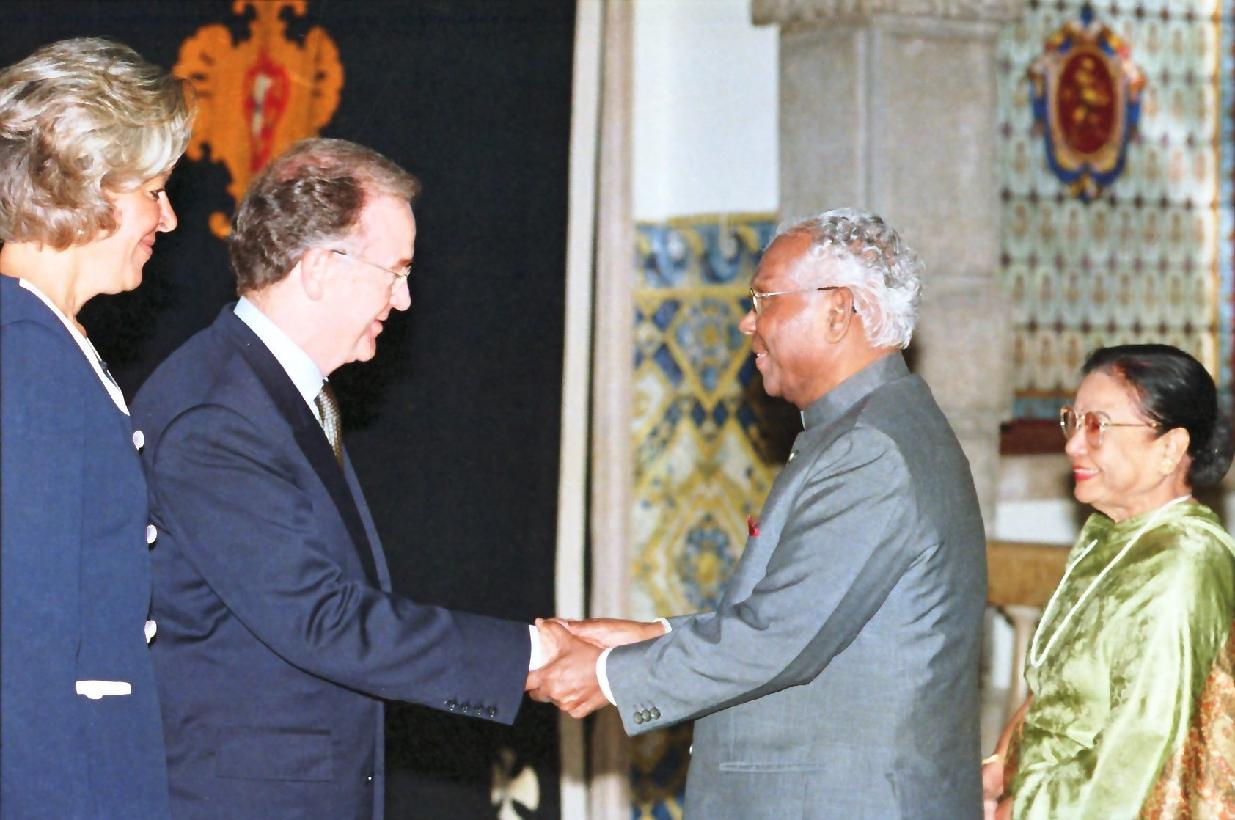
President Sampaio and his wife Maria Rodrigues welcome Indian President K. R. Narayanan to Lisbon, September 1998

In 1998, Sampaio became the first president to call referendums: the first was held on 28 June about abortion and the second was held on 8 November about regionalization.

==== East Timorese struggle ====
Upon becoming president in 1996, Sampaio and the government of António Guterres began to work on the independence of East Timor, which was then a province of Indonesia. In Oslo in 1999, in a CNN debate on the situation in Timor with Nobel Peace Prize winners José Ramos-Horta and bishop Carlos Ximenes Belo, Sampaio's intervention had international repercussions due to his confrontation with the Indonesian ambassador to the United Nations (UN) Nugroho Wisnumurtio. Sampaio supported the independence of East Timor.

After the resignation of Indonesia's President Suharto in 1998 and the succession of B. J. Habibie, Portuguese and international diplomacy led to the holding in East Timor of an independence referendum for the province. The plebescite was held on 30 August 1999 and was followed by a campaign of extreme violence and terror by pro-Indonesian militias, and Portugal put pressure on the international community, especially the administration of U.S. President Bill Clinton, to take a position. A crisis cabinet was convened at Belém Palace. Sampaio and the Portuguese government made contacts for an international peacekeeping force to enter the territory. On 15 September 1999, the United Nations Security Council Resolution 1264 was adopted and the International Force East Timor was established.

Former President of East Timor José Ramos-Horta said Sampaio "was a great defender of the East Timorese cause and played a crucial role in the political and diplomatic solution that led to independence". Sampaio visited East Timor for the first time in February 2000; he was the first Portuguese head of state to do so but his visit was shortened when he learned of the death of his mother. Sampaio returned to East Timor in 2002 following the country's Independence with Xanana Gusmão as president. East Timor was also the destination for Sampaio's last official trip in 2006.

==== End of Portuguese sovereignty over Macau ====
In 1999, negotiations for the transfer of sovereignty over Macau to China came to an end and on 19 December, the transfer was completed with the Chinese leader Jiang Zemin. Shortly before midnight, Sampaio made a farewell speech, ending 442 years of Portuguese colonialism in Macau. Sampaio's participation in the ceremony was doubtful in March of that year because Sampaio refused to take part without the resolution of questions about the territory's future.

=== Second term: 2001–2006 ===
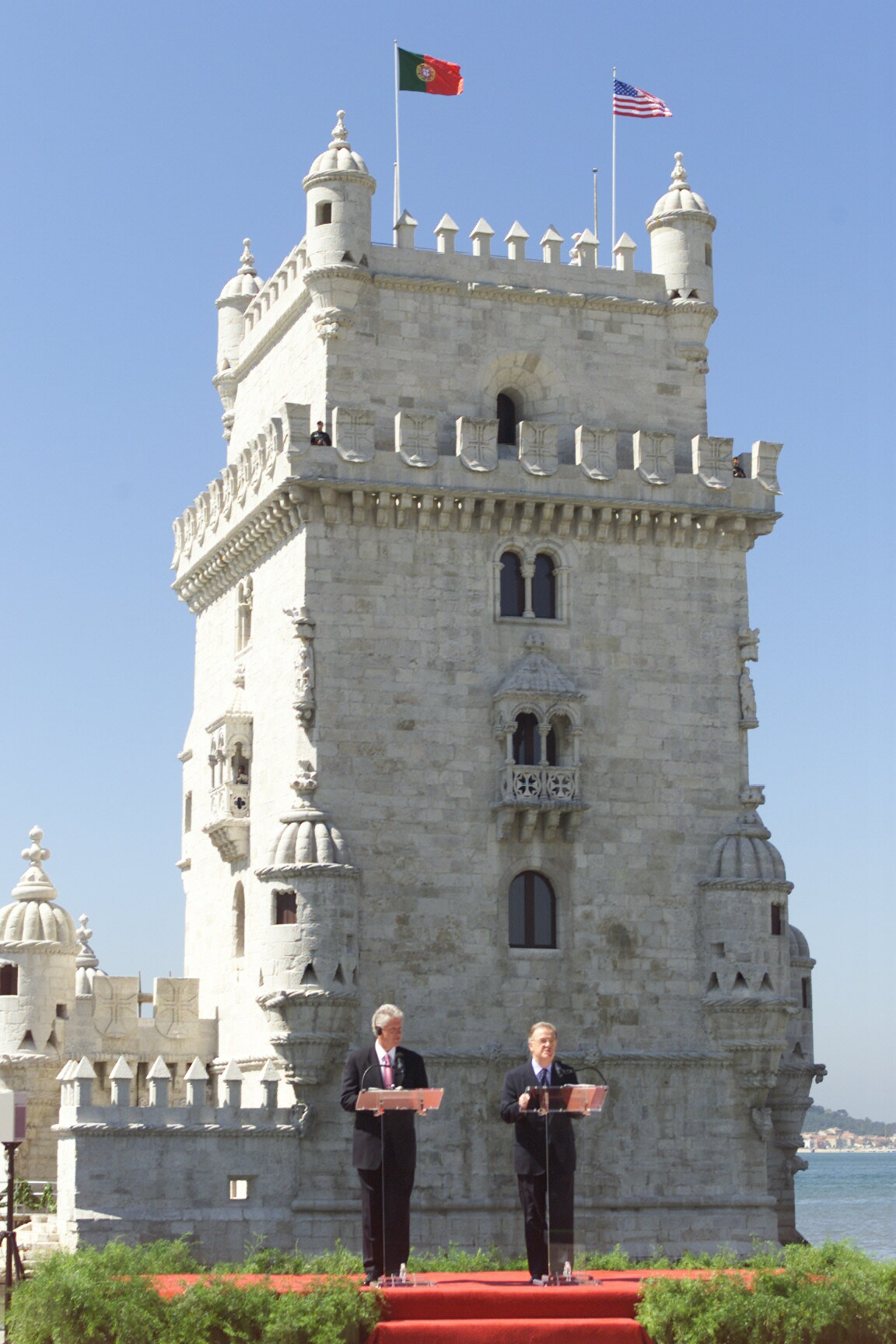
President Sampaio welcomes President Clinton to Lisbon in front of the Belém Tower and the Belém Presidential Palace, 30 May 2000. It was the first visit by a U.S. president to Portugal in 15 years. 2000

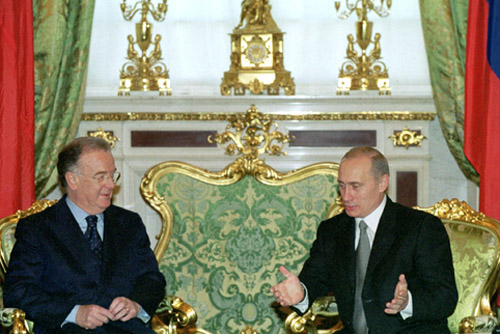
Sampaio with Russian president Vladimir Putin in Moscow, October 2001

On 19 October 2000, Sampaio announced his candidacy in the 2001 presidential election. Sampaio won the election, defeating Joaquim Ferreira do Amaral with 2,401,015 votes (55.55%).

In 2001, while the September 11 attacks on the United States were underway, Sampaio was having lunch with a guest at Belém Palace and had to immediately cancel. In early September 2002, discussions about a possible invasion of Iraq began; from that moment, as Sampaio acknowledged in an interview in 2016, he did not agree with Durão Barroso's position Portugal should participate and was strongly opposed to sending troops to Iraq. Sampaio thought the Azores summit would have the objective of avoiding war, according to the prime minister, but as president, Sampaio was not competent to decide on foreign policy.

The defeat of the Socialist Party in the municipal elections of 2001 ended the government of António Guterres, who resigned. Instead of appointing the new leader of the PS Eduardo Ferro Rodrigues as head of government, after a round of consultations with the parliamentary parties, Sampaio dissolved the Assembly and called elections for March 2002. José Manuel Barroso won the legislative election and Sampaio nominated him as the new prime minister.

In February 2002, in an interview for the BBC, Sampaio said Portugal would hold a new referendum to decriminalize abortion. In the same interview, he defended the government's decision to decriminalize the use of certain drugs, a proposal several European leaders criticized. Sampaio also stated Europe should commit itself more energetically to resolve the crisis in the Middle East, and that the Palestinians and Israelis should return to negotiations.

On 4 April 2002, Sampaio said he welcomed the peace accords that ended the Angolan Civil War, saying it "opens the way to reconciliation among Angolans and general elections".

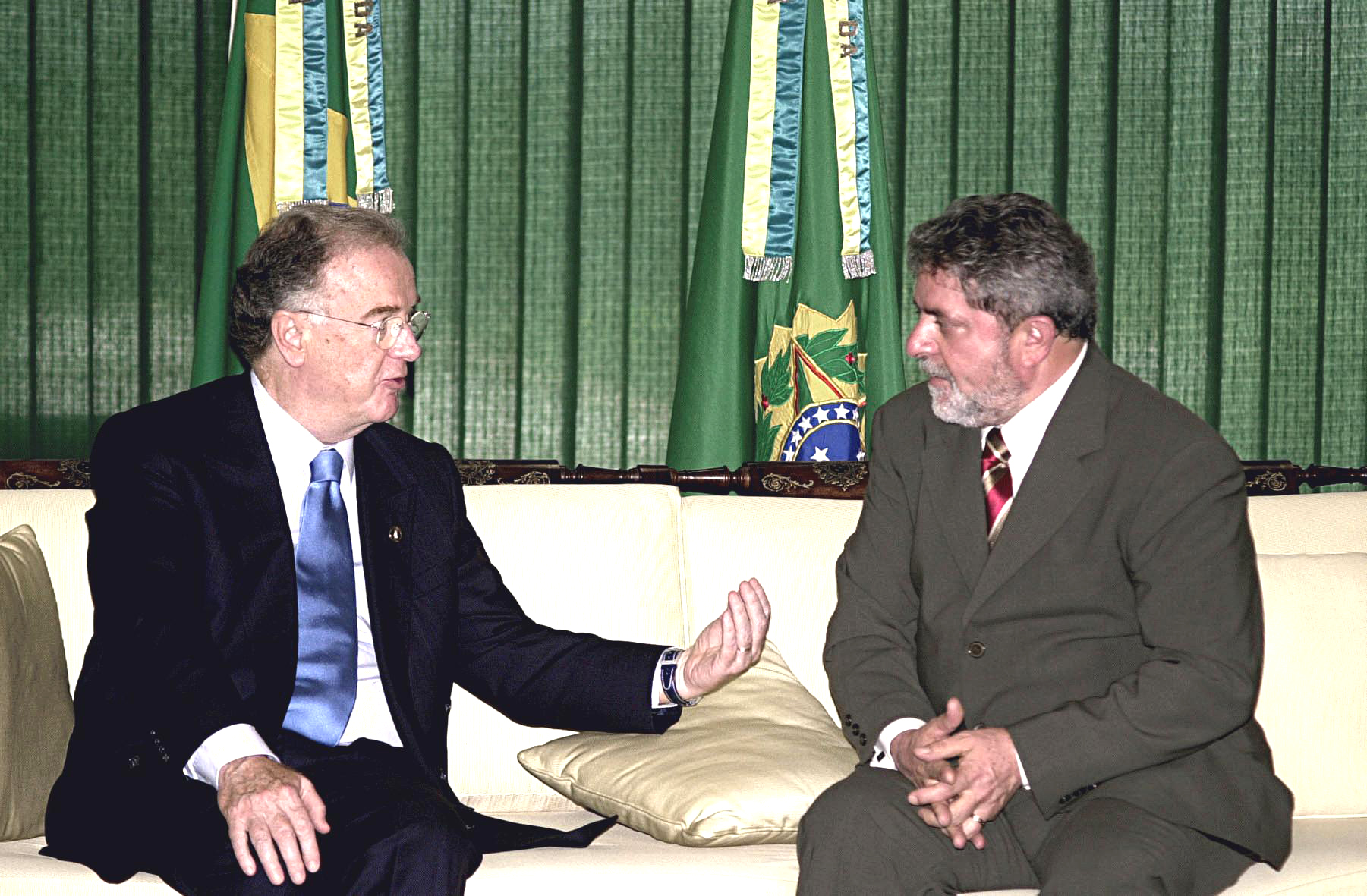
Sampaio with Brazilian president Lula da Silva in a visit to Brazil in 2003

In October 2003, Sampaio invited the presidents of Finland and Germany, and the soon-to-be EU members Hungary, Latvia, and Poland to Arraiolos to discuss the consequences of the 2004 enlargement of the European Union and plans for a Constitution for Europe.

In 2004, Sampaio refused to hold an early election following the resignation of Social Democratic Party Prime Minister Durão Barroso. Sampaio's refusal was met with protests from all left-wing parties and the resignation of socialist leader Ferro Rodrigues. Sampaio appointed Pedro Santana Lopes as Prime Minister on 9 July 2004. On 30 November, Sampaio said the new cabinet was not achieving the desired stability and he dissolved the Parliament and called another election for February 2005. Following the PS's absolute majority in this election, Sampaio appointed José Sócrates Prime Minister.

Sampaio's successor was chosen in the presidential election on 22 January 2006. Aníbal Cavaco Silva, who Sampaio defeated in 1996, succeeded him on 9 March 2006. During his ten years in office, Sampaio convened the Portuguese Council of State 22 times, mainly to manage the Macau issue. As of 2023, it is the highest number of conventions of any Portuguese president.

== Post-presidential career ==
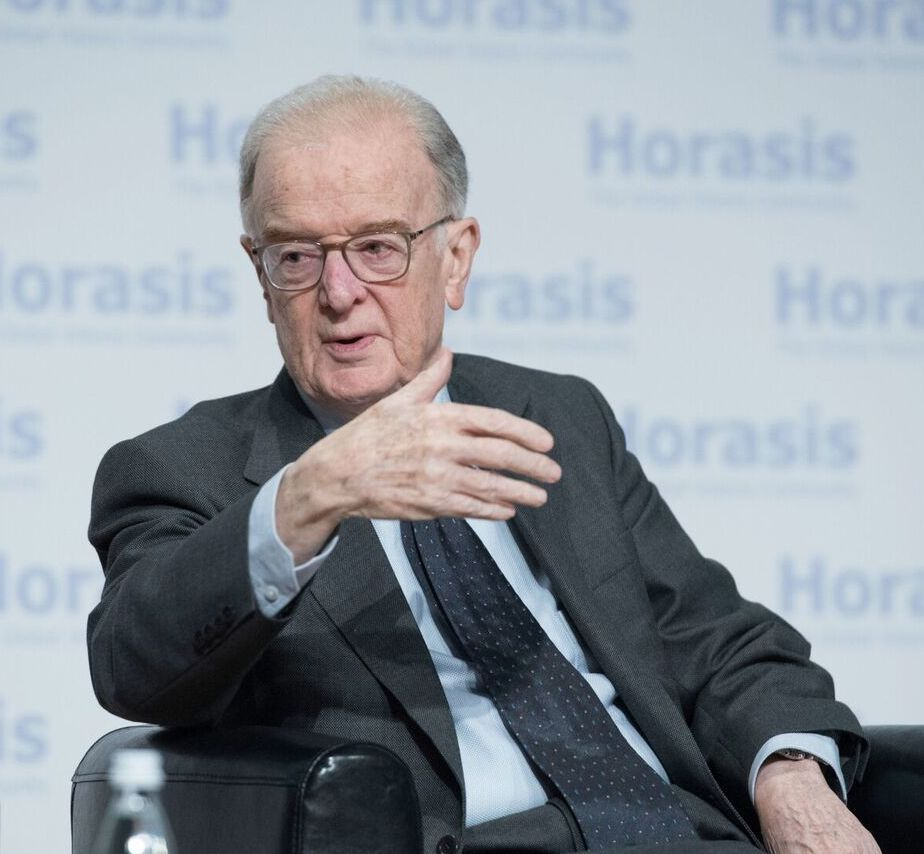
Sampaio at the 2018 Horasis Global Meeting in Cascais

As a former President, Jorge Sampaio became a member of the Portuguese Council of State in 2006. He was also member of the Club de Madrid, an organization of more than 80 former democratic statespersons.

In May 2006, United Nations Secretary-General Kofi Annan appointed Sampaio as his first Special Envoy for the Global Plan to Stop Tuberculosis. On 26 April 2007, new UN Secretary-General Ban Ki-moon designated Sampaio as High Representative for the Alliance of Civilizations, a position he held until February 2013, when Nassir Abdulaziz Al-Nasser succeeded him.

In 2010, Sampaio participated in the jury for Fondation Chirac's Conflict Prevention Prize. From 2013, he led the Global Platform for Syrian Students to boost the academic training of young people in Syria after the outbreak of the country's civil war and refugee crisis. On 26 August 2021, in an article in the newspaper Público, Sampaio announced the Global Platform for Syrian Students was creating academic training for female Afghan students amid the Taliban's seizure of power in Afghanistan.

== Personal life ==
Jorge Sampaio married twice. In 1967, he married Karin Schmidt Dias, a physician and daughter of anthropologist Jorge Dias and German-born pianist Margot Dias (née Schmidt), with whom he had no children. The couple divorced in 1971.

On 6 April 1974, Sampaio married Maria José Ritta, with whom he had two children: Vera Ritta de Sampaio was born in 1975 and André Ritta de Sampaio was born in 1980.

Sampaio played piano from childhood and was a member of Sporting CP, in which his membership number was 3,109. He supported bullfighting, and collected records and paintings. He was shy, cried easily, was discreet, had a poor temper, and was altruistic. He also had a British accent and red hair he inherited from a paternal great-grandfather.

== Death and funeral ==
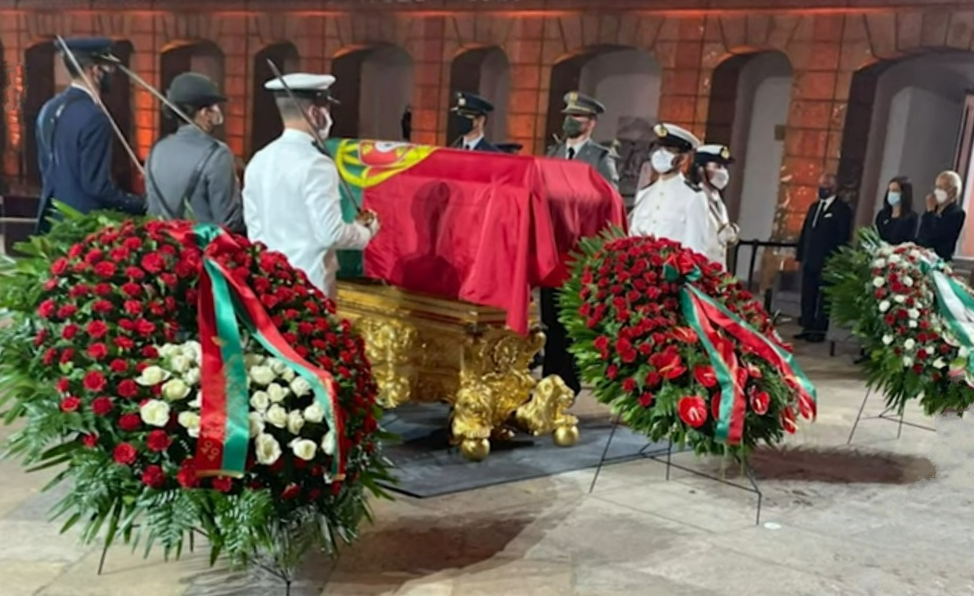
Jorge Sampaio lying in state at the National Coach Museum in 2021

In August 2021, while on vacation in Algarve, Sampaio began to feel unwell and was transferred by helicopter to Lisbon. On 27 August, he was admitted to Santa Cruz hospital, where he died of respiratory failure on 10 September 2021, eight days before his 82nd birthday. On that day, the Council of Ministers decreed three days of national mourning would begin on 11 September. The next day, the funeral procession transited Lisbon City Hall, where the mayor Fernando Medina received him. The final destination was the Royal Riding Arena of the National Coach Museum, where the mortuary chapel was installed and his coffin was flanked with wreaths of red carnations.

On Sunday 12 September, Sampaio's state funeral was held at Jerónimos Monastery and was attended by the highest national institutions, including UN Secretary-General and former Prime Minister António Guterres. Also present were foreign leaders such as the King of Spain Felipe VI, the Prime Minister of Cape Verde Ulisses Correia e Silva, the President of the Parliament of East Timor Aniceto Guterres Lopes, and delegates of the Community of Portuguese Language Countries. Later, in a private ceremony, Sampaio was buried at Alto de São João Cemetery, Lisbon.

== Electoral history ==
=== PS leadership election, 1989 ===
Ballot: 15 January 1989
Candidate	Votes	%
Jorge Sampaio	1,013	62.7
Jaime Gama	561	34.7
Blank/Invalid ballots	42	2.6
Turnout	1,616	
Source: Acção Socialista

=== Lisbon City Council election, 1989 ===
Ballot: 17 December 1989
Party	Candidate	Votes	%	Seats	+/−
PS/CDU/MDP/CDE	Jorge Sampaio	180,635	49.1	9	+1
PSD/CDS/PPM	Marcelo Rebelo de Sousa	154,888	42.1	8	–1
PRD	Hermínio Martinho	11,453	3.1	0	new
PCTP/MRPP	Garcia Pereira	6,390	1.7	0	±0
FER	Gil Garcia	1,326	0.4	0	new
Blank/Invalid ballots		13,433	3.7	–	–
Turnout		368,125	54.76	17	±0
Source: Autárquicas 1989

=== Legislative election, 1991 ===
Ballot: 6 October 1991
Party	Candidate	Votes	%	Seats	+/−
PSD	Aníbal Cavaco Silva	2,902,351	50.6	135	–13
PS	Jorge Sampaio	1,670,758	29.1	72	+12
CDU	Álvaro Cunhal	504,583	8.8	17	–14
CDS	Diogo Freitas do Amaral	254,317	4.4	5	+1
PSN	Manuel Sérgio	96,096	1.6	1	new
PSR	Francisco Louçã	64,159	1.1	0	±0
Other parties		132,495	2.3	0	–7
Blank/Invalid ballots		110,672	1.9	–	–
Turnout		5,735,431	67.78	230	–20
Source: Comissão Nacional de Eleições

=== Lisbon City Council election, 1993 ===
Ballot: 12 December 1993
Party	Candidate	Votes	%	Seats	+/−
PS/CDU/UDP/PSR	Jorge Sampaio	200,816	56.6	11	+2
PSD	Macário Correia	93,497	26.4	5	–2
CDS–PP	Pedro Feist	27,420	7.7	1	±0
MPT	Gonçalo Ribeiro Telles	13,010	3.7	0	new
PCTP/MRPP	Carlos Paisana	4,154	1.2	0	±0
PSN	João Santos	3,166	0.9	0	new
Blank/Invalid ballots		12,463	3.5	–	–
Turnout		354,526	53.49	17	±0
Source: Autárquicas 1993

=== Presidential election, 1996 ===
Ballot: 14 January 1996
Candidate	Votes	%
Jorge Sampaio	3,035,056	53.9
Aníbal Cavaco Silva	2,595,131	46.1
Blank/Invalid ballots	132,791	–
Turnout	5,762,978	66.29
Source: Comissão Nacional de Eleições

=== Presidential election, 2001 ===
Ballot: 14 January 2001
Candidate	Votes	%
Jorge Sampaio	2,401,015	55.6
Joaquim Ferreira do Amaral	1,498,948	34.7
António Abreu	223,196	5.2
Fernando Rosas	129,840	3.0
Garcia Pereira	68,900	1.6
Blank/Invalid ballots	127,901	–
Turnout	4,449,800	49.71
Source: Comissão Nacional de Eleições

== Honours and awards ==
Coat of arms of Jorge Sampaio as knight of the Order of Charles III

In 2004, Sampaio received the Charles V European Award. In 2009, Sampaio was awarded the North–South Prize of the Council of Europe. In 2015, he, along with Dr. Helena Ndume, was a recipient of the Nelson Rolihlahla Mandela Prize in recognition of his role in the campaign for the restoration of democracy in Portugal, the pro bono defense of political prisoners, and for raising awareness of tuberculosis as the UN Secretary-General's first Special Envoy to Stop Tuberculosis.

=== National honours ===
- Grand Collar of the Order of Prince Henry (5 April 2018)
- Grand Collar of the Order of Liberty (9 March 2006)
- Grand Collar of the Military Order of the Tower and Sword (9 March 2006)
- Grand Cross of the Sash of the Three Orders (9 March 1996 - 9 March 2006)
- Grand Officer of the Order of Prince Henry (3 August 1983)

=== Foreign honours ===
- Algeria: Collar of the National Order of Merit (1 December 2004)
- Argentina: Collar of the Order of the Liberator General San Martín (12 December 2001)
- Belgium: Grand Cordon of the Order of Leopold (9 October 2000)
- Brazil:
  - Grand Collar of the Order of the Southern Cross (9 December 1997)
  - Grand Cross of the Order of the Southern Cross (22 August 1991)
  - Grand Cross of the Order of Rio Branco (25 July 1996)
- Cape Verde: First Class of the Amílcar Cabral Order (26 March 2001)
- Chile:
  - Collar of the Order of Merit (30 September 2001)
  - Grand Cross of the Order of Bernardo O'Higgins (5 March 1993)
- Cyprus: Grand Cross of the Order of Merit of the Republic of Cyprus (30 September 2001)
- East Timor: Grand Collar of the Order of Timor-Leste (30 August 2009)
- Estonia:
  - Collar of the Order of the Cross of Terra Mariana (27 June 2003)
  - First Class of the Order of the White Star (29 March 2006)
- Finland:
  - Grand Cross with Collar of the Order of the White Rose of Finland (6 February 2003)
  - Commander Grand Cross of the Order of the Lion of Finland (8 March 1991)
- France: Grand Cross of the National Order of the Legion of Honour (29 November 1999)
- Gabon: Grand Cross of the Order of the Equatorial Star (8 January 2002)
- Germany:
  - Grand Cross Special Class of the Order of Merit of the Federal Republic of Germany (17 May 1999)
  - Grand Cross 1st Class of the Order of Merit of the Federal Republic of Germany (15 October 1996)
- Greece: Grand Cross of the Order of the Redeemer (10 December 1999)
- Guinea-Bissau: Grand Cross of the National Order of the Boé Hills (2 July 1996)
- Hungary:
  - Grand Cross with Chain of the Hungarian Order of Merit (23 September 2003)
  - Grand Cross of the Hungarian Order of Merit (22 April 1999)
- Italy: Knight Grand Cross with Collar of the Order of Merit of the Italian Republic (4 December 2001)
- Latvia: Commander Grand Cross with Chain of the Order of the Three Stars (8 May 2003)
- Lithuania: Grand Cross of the Order of Vytautas the Great (27 June 2003)
- Luxembourg: Knight of the Order of the Gold Lion of the House of Nassau (15 June 2010)
- Mexico: Collar of the Order of the Aztec Eagle (14 May 1999)
- Morocco: Grand Cordon of the Order of Ouissam Alaouite (27 July 1995)
- Mozambique: First Class of the Order of Friendship and Peace (12 May 1997)
- Netherlands: Knight Grand Cross of the Order of Orange-Nassau (25 March 1992)
- Norway: Grand Cross of the Order of St Olav (24 June 2004)
- Paraguay: Collar of the National Order of Merit (4 January 2006)
- Poland: Knight of the Order of the White Eagle (9 October 1997)
- Romania: Collar of the Order of the Star of Romania (15 March 2000)
- Slovakia: Grand Cross of the Order of the White Double Cross (30 June 2003)
- Slovenia: Gold Medal of the Order of Freedom of the Republic of Slovenia (31 March 2000)
- Spain:
  - Collar of the Order of Charles III (11 September 2000)
  - Collar of the Order of Isabella the Catholic (3 March 1998)
- Tunisia:
  - Grand Cordon of the Order of the Republic (12 July 1994)
  - Grand Cordon of the Order of 7 November (10 May 2000)
- Ukraine: First Class of the Order of Prince Yaroslav the Wise (13 April 1998)
- United Kingdom:
  - Honorary Knight Grand Cross of the Most Distinguished Order of Saint Michael and Saint George (23 September 2002)
  - Honorary Knight Grand Cross of the Royal Victorian Order (12 July 1994)
- Venezuela:
  - Collar of the Order of the Liberator (24 February 1999)
  - Grand Cross of the Order of Francisco de Miranda (24 June 2002)

=== Honoris causa ===
- Honoris causa from the University of Aveiro (2008)
- Honoris causa from the University of Coimbra (2010)
- Honoris causa from the University of Lisbon (2010)
- Honoris causa from King's College London (2014)
- Honoris causa from the University of Porto (2015)

== See also ==
- History of Portugal
- Politics of Portugal

== Footnotes ==
Assembly seats
Title jointly held	Member of the Assembly of the Republic from Lisbon; 1976–1983; 1985–1987; 1991–1995	Title jointly held
Title jointly held	Member of the Assembly of the Republic from Santarém; 1987–1991	Title jointly held
Party political offices
Preceded by Vítor Constâncio	Secretary-General of the Socialist Party; 1989–1992	Succeeded by António Guterres
Political offices
Preceded by Vítor Constâncio	Leader of the Opposition; 1988–1992	Succeeded by António Guterres
Preceded by Nuno Krus Abecassis	Mayor of Lisbon; 1990–1995	Succeeded by João Soares
Preceded by Mário Soares	President of Portugal; 1996–2006	Succeeded by Aníbal Cavaco Silva
Diplomatic posts
New title	High-Representative for the Alliance of Civilizations; 2007–2013	Succeeded by Nassir Abdulaziz Al-Nasser
