= 2001 Portuguese presidential election =

- 14 January 2001
- Turnout: 49.71% (▼16.58pp)
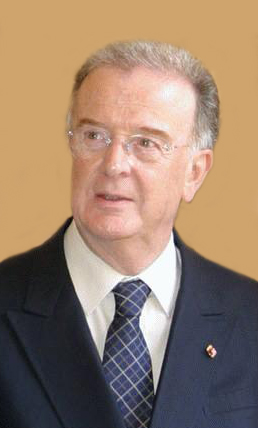

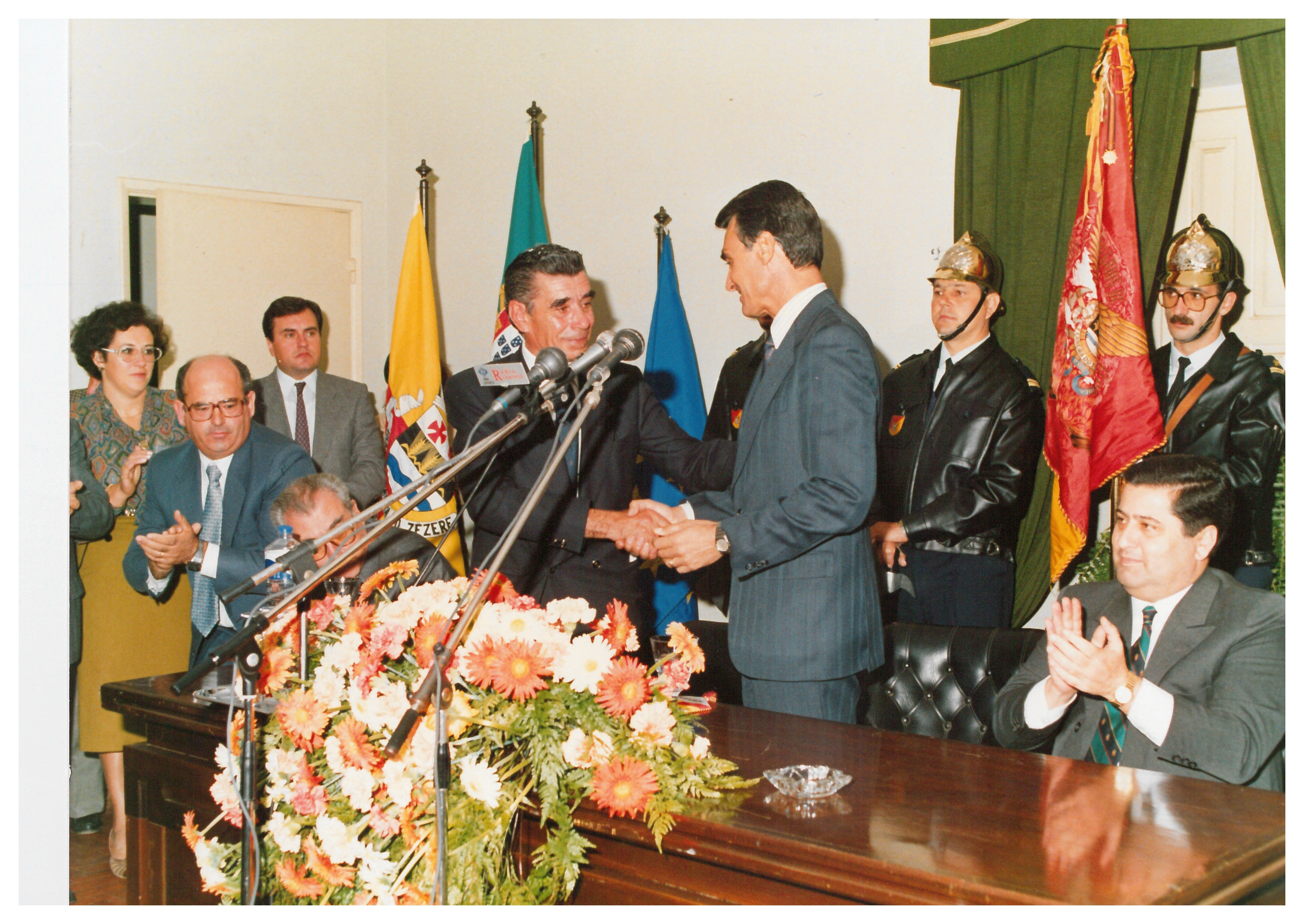

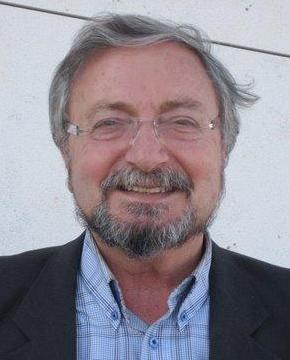
| Candidate | Jorge Sampaio | Ferreira do Amaral | António Abreu |
| Party | PS | PSD Supported by: CDS–PP | PCP Supported by: PEV |
| Popular vote | 2,401,015 | 1,498,948 | 223,196 |
| Percentage | 55.55% | 34.68% | 5.16% |

Sampaio
40-50%
50-60%
60-70%
70-80%
Amaral
40-50%
50-60%
60-70%
President before election
Jorge Sampaio
PS
Elected President
Jorge Sampaio
PS

A presidential election was held in Portugal on 14 January 2001.

Incumbent president Jorge Sampaio was eliglbe to run for a second consecutive term, and was a candidate for re-election. Sampaio was easily re-elected for a second term, like what happened with Mário Soares and Ramalho Eanes, gathering 55% of the votes and winning all districts except Bragança.

As the re-election of the center-left president was certain, both the Portuguese Communist Party and the Left Bloc (BE), the latter for the first time, presented their own candidates. The Communists presented António Abreu, a candidate with low name recognition among voters, which resulted in poor results, just 5% of the votes, while the BE supported Fernando Rosas, who polled at 3% of the votes. The Communist Party of the Portuguese Workers also presented its own candidate for the first time in its history, Garcia Pereira, polling at 1.6% of the votes. On the right, Ferreira do Amaral was supported by the two major parties from that side, the Social Democratic Party and the CDS – People's Party, winning approximately 35% of the votes and polling second, failing once again the objective of electing a right-wing president for the first time since the Carnation Revolution.

Turnout was quite low, just 49.71 percent of voters cast a ballot, however, this was the first presidential election in which Portuguese overseas voters were able to cast a ballot. Jorge Sampaio was sworn in for a second term as President on 9 March 2001.

== Background ==
Jorge Sampaio was elected president, in January 1996, with nearly 54% of the votes. Sampaio's first term was marked by the calm relationship with prime minister António Guterres, also from the Socialist Party (PS). Sampaio's term as head of state was also defined by his role in the struggle for East Timor's independence, in which the president was an active voice against Indonesian occupation and demanded self-determination for the Timorese people, the handover of Macau in 1999, where Sampaio was visibly moved, and the Expo '98.

=== Pre-campaign ===
In the follow-up for the presidential election, and with Sampaio's victory a sure thing, divisions on the right-wing emerged regarding a common presidential candidate supported by both PSD and CDS–PP. The CDS–PP, at first, considered presenting a candidate of its own, with 1991 candidate Basílio Horta announcing a candidacy, but dropping out after the summer of 2000. On the PSD, party leader José Manuel Durão Barroso invited former prime minister Francisco Pinto Balsemão to run against Sampaio, but Balsemão rejected. By then, the candidacy of former minister under Cavaco Silva, Joaquim Ferreira do Amaral, which had announced his run in March 2000, became the sole one on the right-wing, gaining the support of the PSD and also of many CDS–PP members, with party leader Paulo Portas asking his electorate to "not vote for the socialist candidate".

== Electoral system ==
Any Portuguese citizen over 35 years old has the opportunity to run for president. In order to do so it is necessary to gather between 7,500 and 15,000 signatures and submit them to the Portuguese Constitutional Court.

According to the Portuguese Constitution, to be elected, a candidate needs a majority of votes. If no candidate gets this majority there will take place a second round between the two most voted candidates.

== Candidates ==
=== Official candidates ===
Candidates who formalized their candidacy and submitted enough signatures to the Constitutional Court that were accepted. Candidates are ordered by their vote share.

| Candidate | Party support | Political office(s) | Details |
|---|---|---|---|
| Jorge Sampaio (61) | Socialist Party | President of the Republic (1996–2006); Mayor of Lisbon (1989–1995); Secretary-general of the Socialist Party (1989–1992); Member of the Assembly of the Republic (1976–1983; 1985–1995) | Incumbent president after winning the 1996 presidential election with 53.9% of the votes; eligible for a second term. |
| Joaquim Ferreira do Amaral (55) | Social Democratic Party CDS – People's Party | Member of the Assembly of the Republic (1995–2009); Minister of Public Works (1990–1995); Minister of Commerce and Tourism (1984–1985; 1987–1990); Secretary of State for Tourism (1983–1984); Secretary of State for European Integration (1981); Secretary of State for Industries (1979–1980) | Social Democratic Party (PSD) member; engineer. |
| António Abreu (53) | Portuguese Communist Party Ecologist Party "The Greens" | City Councillor in Lisbon (1993–2001) | Portuguese Communist Party (PCP) member since 1969; engineer. |
| Fernando Rosas (54) | Left Bloc | None | Left Bloc (BE) founding member; journalist and historian. |
| António Garcia Pereira (49) | Portuguese Workers' Communist Party | Secretary-general of the Portuguese Workers' Communist Party (1982–2015) | Portuguese Workers' Communist Party (PCTP/MRPP) member; lawyer. |

Official logo of the election.

=== Unsuccessful candidacies ===
There were also four candidates rejected by the Portuguese Constitutional Court for not complying with the legal requirement of being proposed by 7500 voters:

- Pedro Maria Braga;
- Maria Teresa Lameiro;
- Josué Rodrigues Pedro;
- Manuel João Vieira;

These four candidates were present in the draw of the ballot position, but did not appear in the final ballot.

=== Declined ===
- Aníbal Cavaco Silva – former Prime Minister (1985–1995); presidential candidate in the previous election;
- Basílio Horta – minister in previous governments; candidate in the 1991 presidential election;
- Daniel Proença de Carvalho – former Minister of Social Communication (1978–1979);
- Diogo Freitas do Amaral – former President of the CDS (1974–1983; 1988–1992); candidate in the 1986 presidential election;
- Francisco Pinto Balsemão – former Prime Minister (1981–1983); former President of the Social Democratic Party (1980–1983);
- José Manuel Durão Barroso – incumbent President of the Social Democratic Party (1999–2004);
- José Vieira de Carvalho – incumbent Mayor of Maia (1970–1974; 1979–2002);
- Marcelo Rebelo de Sousa – former President of the Social Democratic Party (1996–1999).

== Campaign period ==
=== Issues ===
With Jorge Sampaio's re-election practically guaranteed, the campaign was mostly dominated by foreign policy. In the aftermath of the Kosovo war, Portuguese troops participated in NATO missions, but the death of a soldier who returned from one of these missions raised suspicions of contamination by depleted uranium. The then-socialist government, led by António Guterres, acknowledged that it knew of NATO's use of depleted uranium weapons against Kosovo, and claimed the danger was downplayed. This case caused an embarrassment to Sampaio's campaign, with his opponents accusing the President of "protecting" the government.

=== Party slogans ===
| Candidate | Original slogan | English translation | Refs |
|---|---|---|---|
| Jorge Sampaio | « Por todos nós » | "For all of us" | |
| Joaquim Ferreira do Amaral | « Juntos conseguimos » | "Together we succeed" | |
| António Abreu | « Razões de esquerda para Portugal » | "Left reasons for Portugal" | |
| Fernando Rosas | « Esquerda com rosto » | "Left with a face" | |
| António Garcia Pereira | « Ousar sonhar, ousar lutar, ousar vencer! » | "Dare to dream, dare to fight, dare to win!" | |

=== Candidates' debates ===
2001 Portuguese presidential election debates
| Date | Organisers | Moderator(s) | P Present A Absent invitee N Non-invitee | | | | | |
| Date | Organisers | Moderator(s) | Sampaio | Amaral | Abreu | Rosas | Pereira | Refs |
|---|---|---|---|---|---|---|---|---|
| 4 Jan | RTP1 | Judite de Sousa | P | P | P | P | P | |

== Opinion polls ==
Exit poll

| Polling firm | Date released | Sample size | Jorge Sampaio | Ferreira do Amaral | António Abreu | Fernando Rosas | Garcia Pereira | Oth/ Und | Lead |
| Polling firm | Date released | Sample size | PS | PSD | CDU | BE | PCTP | Oth/ Und | Lead |
|---|---|---|---|---|---|---|---|---|---|
| Election results | 14 Jan 2001 | —N/a | 55.6 | 34.7 | 5.2 | 3.0 | 1.6 | —N/a | 20.9 |
| UCP | 14 Jan 2001 | —N/a | 54–59 | 32–36 | 4–7 | 2–3.5 | 1–2.5 | —N/a | 22.5 |
| Eurosondagem | 14 Jan 2001 | —N/a | 55.9–58.7 | 31.1–34.9 | 4.2–6.4 | 1.7–3.3 | 1.1–2.3 | —N/a | 24.4 |
| Intercampus | 14 Jan 2001 | —N/a | 54.8–59.2 | 30.9–35.1 | 4.5–6.5 | 1.9–3.3 | 1.3–2.5 | —N/a | 24.0 |
| UCP | 12 Jan 2001 | —N/a | 63.5 | 29.1 | 2.4 | 2.7 | 2.2 | —N/a | 34.4 |
| Euroexpansão | 12 Jan 2001 | —N/a | 64.8 | 31.9 | 1.2 | 1.7 | 0.4 | —N/a | 32.9 |
| Eurosondagem | 12 Jan 2001 | —N/a | 67.6 | 27.6 | 1.5 | 2.2 | 0.9 | —N/a | 40.0 |
| UCP | 7 Jan 2001 | —N/a | 67.9 | 27.2 | 2.2 | 1.9 | 0.8 | —N/a | 40.7 |
| Euroexpansão | 30 Dec 2000 | —N/a | 60.1 | 29.6 | 1.1 | 1.6 | 0.4 | 7.2 | 30.5 |
| UCP | 18 Dec 2001 | —N/a | 62.0 | 31.6 | 1.7 | 2.0 | 0.2 | 2.5 | 30.4 |
| Euroexpansão | Nov 2000 | —N/a | 61.9 | 26.4 | 1.3 | 1.4 | —N/a | 9.0 | 35.5 |
| Marktest | 26 May 2000 | —N/a | 66.5 | 13.9 | —N/a | —N/a | —N/a | 3.8 (Note: Basílio Horta: 3.8%) | 52.6 |
| Euroexpansão | 1 Apr 2000 | —N/a | 67 | 17 | —N/a | —N/a | —N/a | 5 (Note: With Basílio Horta (CDS-PP): 5%) | 50 |

== Results ==
=== National summary ===
| Candidate | Party | Votes | % |
|---|---|---|---|
| Jorge Sampaio | Socialist Party | 2,401,015 | 55.55 |
| Joaquim Ferreira do Amaral | Social Democratic Party (Note: Also supported by CDS – People's Party.) | 1,498,948 | 34.68 |
| António Abreu | Portuguese Communist Party (Note: Also supported by the Ecologist Party "The Greens".) | 223,196 | 5.16 |
| Fernando Rosas | Left Bloc | 129,840 | 3.00 |
| António Garcia Pereira | Portuguese Workers' Communist Party | 68,900 | 1.59 |
| Total | | 4,321,899 | 100.00 |
| Valid votes | | 4,321,899 | 97.13 |
| Invalid votes | | 45,510 | 1.02 |
| Blank votes | | 82,391 | 1.85 |
| Total votes | | 4,449,800 | 100.00 |
| Registered voters/turnout | | 8,950,905 | 49.71 |
Source: Comissão Nacional de Eleições

=== Results by district ===
| District | Sampaio | | Amaral | | Abreu | | Rosas | | Garcia Pereira | | Turnout |
| District | Votes | % | Votes | % | Votes | % | Votes | % | Votes | % | Turnout |
|---|---|---|---|---|---|---|---|---|---|---|---|
| Aveiro | 149,301 | 51.16% | 125,306 | 42.93% | 6,240 | 2.14% | 6,942 | 2.38% | 4,068 | 1.39% | 51.96% |
| Azores | 43,848 | 63.81% | 21,378 | 31.11% | 841 | 1.22% | 1,558 | 2.27% | 1,092 | 1.59% | 37.18% |
| Beja | 41,180 | 62.16% | 9,988 | 15.08% | 11,979 | 18.08% | 2,287 | 3.45% | 814 | 1.23% | 47.12% |
| Braga | 196,641 | 54.79% | 137,989 | 38.45% | 8,922 | 2.49% | 10,362 | 2.89% | 4,998 | 1.39% | 55.24% |
| Bragança | 29,514 | 46.33% | 30,612 | 48.06% | 1,247 | 1.96% | 1,433 | 2.25% | 893 | 1.40% | 43.45% |
| Castelo Branco | 57,888 | 58.89% | 33,353 | 33.93% | 3,069 | 3.12% | 2,698 | 2.74% | 1,296 | 1.32% | 52.45% |
| Coimbra | 107,310 | 58.20% | 62,441 | 33.86% | 6,517 | 3.53% | 5,410 | 2.93% | 2,714 | 1.47% | 50.13% |
| Évora | 45,182 | 62.00% | 14,914 | 20.47% | 9,970 | 13.68% | 2,080 | 2.85% | 724 | 0.99% | 50.28% |
| Faro | 86,483 | 59.40% | 44,471 | 30.54% | 6,415 | 4.41% | 5,394 | 3.70% | 2,834 | 1.95% | 47.48% |
| Guarda | 40,597 | 51.31% | 33,617 | 42.49% | 1,917 | 2.42% | 1,917 | 2.42% | 1,067 | 1.35% | 47.68% |
| Leiria | 90,854 | 47.51% | 86,805 | 45.50% | 5,860 | 3.06% | 5,017 | 2.62% | 2,679 | 1.40% | 51.97% |
| Lisbon | 517,692 | 56.49% | 285,472 | 31.15% | 61,338 | 6.69% | 32,831 | 3.58% | 19,077 | 2.08% | 51.69% |
| Madeira | 51,837 | 51.01% | 43,092 | 42.41% | 1,477 | 1.45% | 3,237 | 3.19% | 1,970 | 1.94% | 49.26% |
| Portalegre | 34,956 | 62.79% | 13,311 | 23.91% | 5,271 | 9.47% | 1,453 | 2.61% | 679 | 1.22% | 51.20% |
| Porto | 428,798 | 57.87% | 256,975 | 34.68% | 25,433 | 3.43% | 19,648 | 2.65% | 10,072 | 1.36% | 53.13% |
| Santarém | 113,079 | 56.84% | 65,258 | 32.80% | 11,344 | 5.70% | 6,320 | 3.18% | 2,959 | 1.49% | 52.59% |
| Setúbal | 190,543 | 60.05% | 64,500 | 20.33% | 44,453 | 14.01% | 12,168 | 3.83% | 5,647 | 1.78% | 50.03% |
| Viana do Castelo | 58,235 | 52.63% | 44,441 | 40.16% | 3,291 | 2.97% | 3,172 | 2.87% | 1,521 | 1.37% | 49.88% |
| Vila Real | 48,037 | 48.44% | 45,519 | 45.90% | 1,955 | 1.97% | 2,343 | 2.36% | 1,312 | 1.32% | 46.24% |
| Viseu | 79,478 | 48.72% | 74,416 | 45.61% | 2,992 | 1.83% | 4,097 | 2.51% | 2,161 | 1.32% | 48.03% |
| Overseas | 9,011 | 59.22% | 5,031 | 33.07% | 650 | 4.27% | 285 | 1.87% | 238 | 1.56% | 8.33% |

=== Maps ===
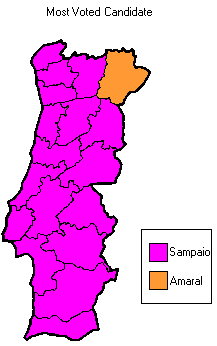
Strongest candidate by electoral district. (Azores and Madeira not shown)

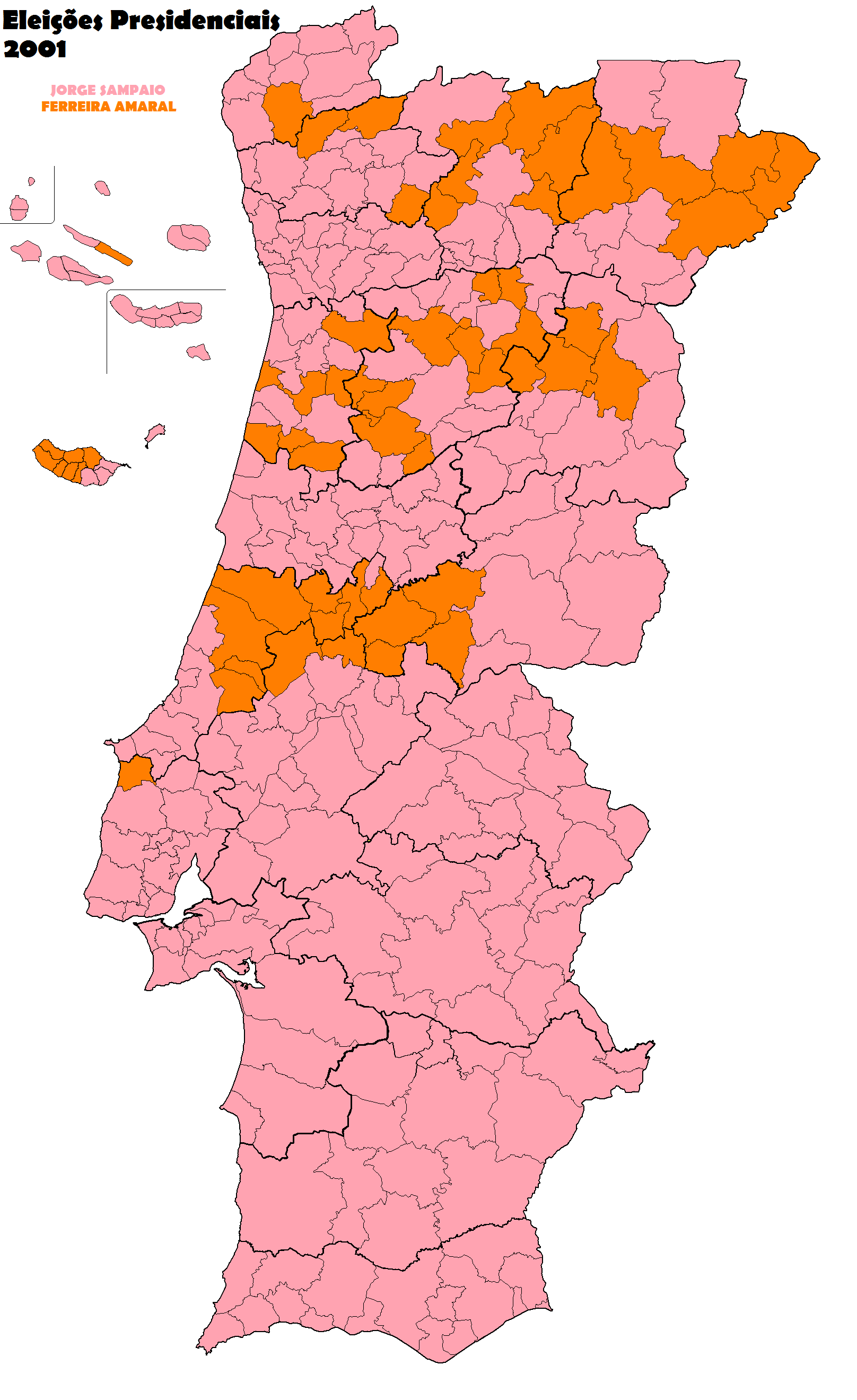
Strongest candidate by municipality.
