= Opinion polling for the 2005 Portuguese legislative election =

In the run up to the 2005 Portuguese legislative election, various organisations carried out opinion polling to gauge voting intention in Portugal. Results of such polls are displayed in this article.

The date range for these opinion polls are from the previous general election, held on 17 March 2002, to the day the next election was held, on 20 February 2005.

== Nationwide polling ==
=== Graphical summary ===
View source data.

=== Polling ===
Poll results are listed in the table below in reverse chronological order, showing the most recent first. The highest percentage figure in each polling survey is displayed in bold, and the background shaded in the leading party's colour. In the instance that there is a tie, then no figure is shaded but both are displayed in bold. The lead column on the right shows the percentage-point difference between the two parties with the highest figures. Poll results use the date the survey's fieldwork was done, as opposed to the date of publication.

Exit poll

Polling firm/Link	Date Released	PSD	PS	CDS–PP	CDU	BE	O	Lead
**2005 legislative election**	20 Feb 2005	28.8; 75	**45.0**; 121	7.2; 12	7.5; 14	6.4; 8	5.1; 0	**16.2**
UCP	20 Feb (20:00)	25–29; 62/70	**45–49**; 124/136	5–7; 7/10	6–8; 10/14	6–8; 10/14	—	20
Eurosondagem	20 Feb (20:00)	23.3–27.1; 65/75	**46.9–50.7**; 123/130	6.1–7.9; 9/13	7.5–9.3; 14/16	6.1–7.9; 8/9	—	23.6
Intercampus	20 Feb (20:00)	26.1–30.1; 68/78	**44.2–48.2**; 117/127	5.5–8.1; 8/14	6.4–9.0; 12/18	5.1–7.7; 6/12	—	18.1
Aximage	18 Feb 2005	29.6	**46.8**	7.3	7.0	5.5	3.8	17.2
Marktest	18 Feb 2005	26.8	**46.0**	7.5	8.9	7.7	3.1	19.2
Eurosondagem	18 Feb 2005	30.6	**45.0**	7.7	7.7	5.7	3.3	14.4
IPOM	18 Feb 2005	30	**46**	8	6	7	3	16
Intercampus	18 Feb 2005	30.3	**45.9**	7.1	7.6	5.2	3.9	15.6
TNS/Euroteste	17 Feb 2005	28	**39**	7	6	6	14	11
UCP	17 Feb 2005	31; 80/84	**46**; 118/124	6; 6/10	7; 8/12	7; 8/12	3; 0	15
Eurosondagem	12 Feb 2005	31.3	**44.4**	7.4	6.9	6.4	3.6	13.1
Aximage	11 Feb 2005	27.4	**44.7**	6.4	7.1	4.8	9.6	17.3
IPOM	4 Feb 2005	31	**49**	8	6	5	1	18
Aximage	4 Feb 2005	29.3	**43.5**	7.0	5.6	3.5	11.1	14.2
Intercampus	3 Feb 2005	31.6	**46.5**	4.8	8.1	4.5	4.5	14.9
Eurosondagem	29 Jan 2005	32.1	**46.1**	7.0	6.6	4.6	3.6	14.0
Marktest	28 Jan 2005	27.7	**45.1**	6.3	7.7	8.1	5.1	17.5
UCP	28 Jan 2005	28	**46**	6	8	8	4	18
Aximage	28 Jan 2005	27.4	**43.3**	6.3	5.8	5.0	12.2	15.9
TNS/Euroteste	27 Jan 2005	32	**40**	6	4	5	13	8
Aximage	21 Jan 2005	28.7	**42.8**	7.1	6.2	4.3	10.9	14.1
Eurosondagem	15 Jan 2005	32.5	**45.7**	6.5	6.5	5.7	3.1	13.2
Aximage	10 Jan 2005	27.5	**45.6**	6.6	6.6	3.4	10.3	18.1
Eurosondagem	8 Jan 2005	33.0	**46.0**	6.9	6.3	4.5	3.3	18.1
Aximage	18 Dec 2004	28.5	**45.6**	6.8	6.4	3.1	9.6	17.1
Eurosondagem	17 Dec 2004	33.3	**48.0**	6.0	6.6	4.0	2.1	14.7
Aximage	4 Dec 2004	31.2	**45.1**	4.0	5.2	3.9	10.6	13.9
Eurosondagem	4 Dec 2004	36.0	**45.0**	5.5	6.6	4.0	2.9	9.0
UCP	27 Nov 2004	35	**46**	3	7	6	3	11
Marktest	Nov 2004	32.4	**49.3**	2.1	6.4	5.8	4.0	16.9
Marktest	Oct 2004	28.4	**49.3**	3.3	8.2	6.7	4.1	20.9
Aximage	14 Sep 2004	33.1	**38.0**	4.6	4.1	3.0	17.2	4.9
Marktest	Sep 2004	34.5	**46.4**	1.6	8.8	5.4	3.3	11.9
Aximage	16 Jul 2004	31.7	**39.5**	4.2	4.8	3.5	16.3	7.8
Marktest	Jul 2004	36.8	**45.4**	2.7	6.3	5.7	3.1	8.6
Aximage	21 Jun 2004	30.3	**42.8**	4.7	6.4	3.3	12.5	12.5
Marktest	Jun 2004	29.9	**47.6**	2.6	5.5	10.0	4.4	17.7
**2004 EP election**	13 Jun 2004	33.3 (90)	**44.5** (116)	w.PSD	9.1 (17)	4.9 (7)	8.2 (0)	**11.2**
Aximage	1 Jun 2004	29.8	**40.0**	4.9	6.4	4.4	14.5	10.2
Marktest	May 2004	36.5	**43.5**	1.5	5.2	6.3	7.0	7.0
Aximage	24 Apr 2004	30.6	**40.1**	5.6	5.3	2.4	16.0	9.5
Marktest	Apr 2004	36.5	**41.9**	2.6	7.3	6.9	4.8	5.4
Aximage	20 Mar 2004	31.7	**38.2**	5.5	6.8	5.2	12.6	6.5
Marktest	Mar 2004	34.9	**43.9**	3.8	6.9	5.7	4.8	9.0
Marktest	Feb 2004	38.7	**42.2**	2.3	6.6	6.4	3.8	3.5
UCP	1 Feb 2004	34	**44**	4	7	7	4	10
Aximage	17 Jan 2004	36.5	**38.6**	4.4	4.6	3.8	12.1	2.1
Eurosondagem	17 Jan 2004	34.2	**35.2**	5.5	4.9	4.5	15.7	1.0
Marktest	Jan 2004	35.1	**40.0**	1.9	9.5	7.8	5.7	4.9
Aximage	21 Dec 2003	29.4	**35.5**	5.2	6.5	5.2	18.2	6.1
Aximage	23 Nov 2003	34.4	**38.5**	2.7	5.9	3.7	14.8	4.1
Marktest	Nov 2003	35.9	**38.8**	5.9	9.0	5.2	5.2	2.9
Aximage	20 Oct 2003	34.4	**36.7**	4.6			24.3	2.3
Marktest	Oct 2003	**43.6**	37.4	3.7	6.4	5.5	3.4	6.2
Aximage	6 Sep 2003	**38.4**	34.6		4.8	4.7	17.5	3.8
Marktest	Sep 2003	37.6	**42.8**	4.1	5.0	6.2	4.3	5.2
Marktest	Jul 2003	**43.3**	36.1	5.5	6.6	4.7	3.8	7.2
Aximage	24 Jun 2003	38.6	**40.7**	3.9	5.6	2.6	8.6	2.1
Marktest	Jun 2003	**40.9**	36.0	7.7	6.7	4.7	4.0	4.9
Aximage	22 May 2003	37.5	**38.8**	3.5	4.9	4.2	11.1	1.3
UCP	19 May 2003	35.6	**44.8**	2.7	7.0	6.5	3.4	9.2
Marktest	May 2003	40.4	**40.8**	5.2	5.4	4.4	3.8	0.4
Aximage	Apr 2003	33.2	**40.6**	4.7	7.3		14.2	7.4
Marktest	Apr 2003	34.7	**45.2**	5.5	6.7	4.0	3.9	10.5
Marktest	28 Mar 2003	36.2	**44.6**	6.2	4.6	4.6	3.8	8.4
Aximage	Mar 2003	31.2	**46.3**				22.5	15.1
Aximage	Feb 2003	33.8	**42.6**				23.6	8.8
Marktest	Feb 2003	36.3	**41.6**	6.0	7.2	4.9	4.0	5.3
Aximage	Jan 2003	36.0	**41.2**	4.1	4.9	4.4	9.4	5.2
Marktest	Jan 2003	38.7	**42.3**	4.8	5.0	5.6	3.6	3.6
Marktest	Nov 2002	36.4	**43.3**	6.5	6.4	4.6	2.8	6.9
Marktest	Oct 2002	**41.8**	37.9	5.7	7.5	3.3	3.8	3.9
Marktest	Sep 2002	37.8	**40.0**	8.3	6.1	3.8	4.0	2.2
Eurosondagem	8 Aug 2002	31.6	**38.0**	8.7	5.2	3.4	13.1	6.4
Marktest	Jul 2002	39.0	**41.4**	7.0	5.1	3.8	3.7	2.4
Marktest	Jun 2002	37.5	**39.8**	6.0	7.5	5.4	3.8	2.3
Marktest	May 2002	**39.0**	37.0	8.6	6.1	4.8	4.5	2.0
**2002 legislative election**	17 Mar 2002	**40.2**; 105	37.8; 96	8.7; 14	6.9; 12	2.7; 3	3.7; 0	**2.4**
