= 2005 Portuguese legislative election =

- 20 February 2005

All 230 seats in the Assembly of the Republic 116 seats needed for a majority
- Opinion polls
- Registered: 8,944,508 ▲0.5%
- Turnout: 5,747,834 (64.3%) ▲2.8 pp
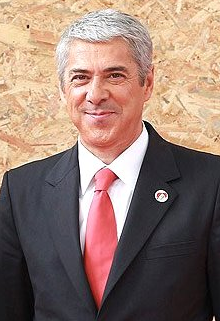

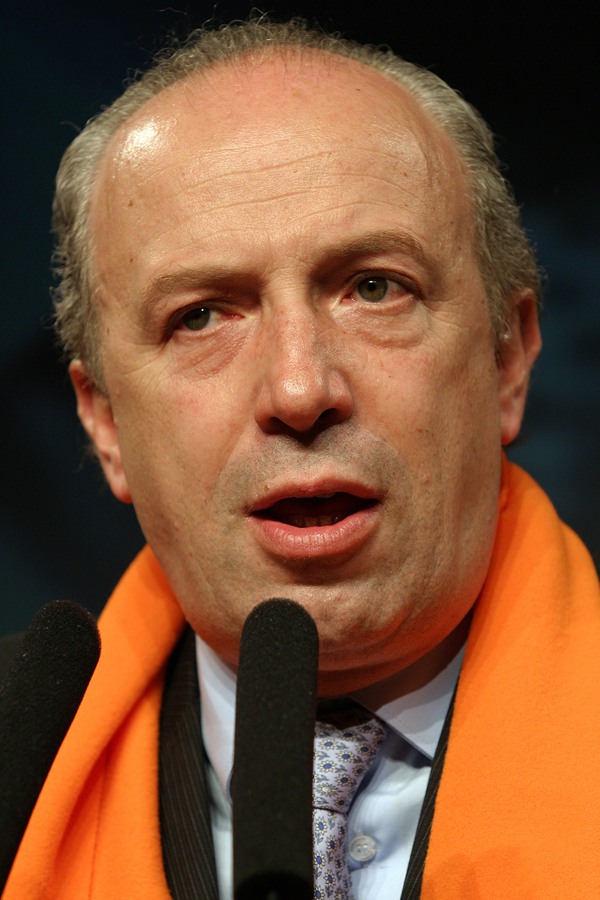

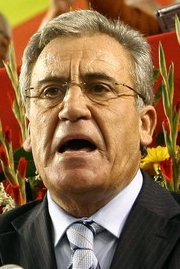

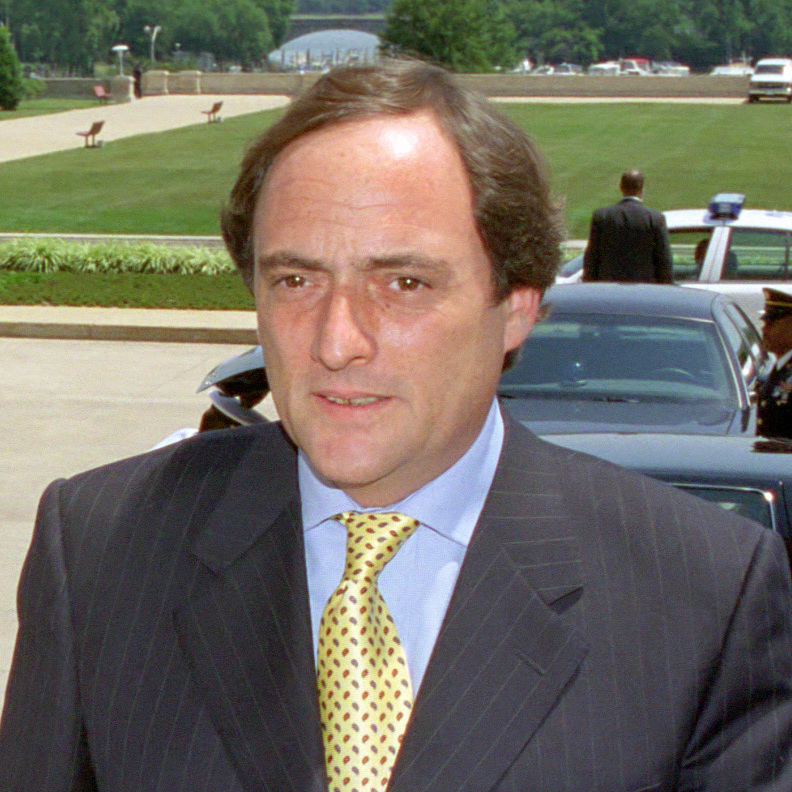

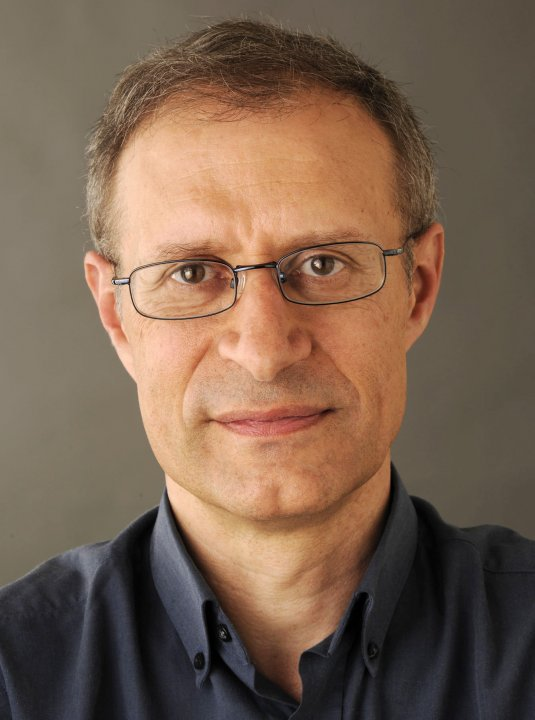
	First party	Second party	Third party
Leader	José Sócrates	Pedro Santana Lopes	Jerónimo de Sousa
Party	PS	PSD	PCP
Alliance			CDU
Leader since	26 September 2004	1 July 2004	27 November 2004
Leader's seat	Castelo Branco	Lisbon	Lisbon
Last election	96 seats, 37.8%	105 seats, 40.2%	12 seats, 6.9%
Seats won	121	75	14
Seat change	▲25	▼30	▲2
Popular vote	2,588,312	1,653,425	433,369
Percentage	45.0%	28.8%	7.5%
Swing	▲7.2 pp	▼11.4 pp	▲0.6 pp
	Fourth party	Fifth party
Leader	Paulo Portas	Francisco Louçã
Party	CDS–PP	BE
Leader since	22 March 1998	24 March 1999
Leader's seat	Aveiro	Lisbon
Last election	14 seats, 8.7%	3 seats, 2.8%
Seats won	12	8
Seat change	▼2	▲5
Popular vote	416,415	364,971
Percentage	7.2%	6.4%
Swing	▼1.5 pp	▲3.6 pp
Prime Minister before election
Pedro Santana Lopes
PSD
Prime Minister after election
José Sócrates
PS

The 2005 Portuguese legislative election took place on 20 February. The election renewed all 230 members of the Assembly of the Republic.

The election was called following President Jorge Sampaio's decision, on 30 November 2004, to dissolve the Parliament as an answer to the political instability caused by the government led by Pedro Santana Lopes (PSD) in coalition with the CDS–PP.

Headed by José Sócrates, the centre-left Socialist Party (PS) won the election by a landslide, winning in 19 of the 22 electoral constituencies, including in districts such as Viseu and Bragança that historically voted for the right. The Socialist Party conquered its first absolute majority, receiving 45 percent of the electorate vote and 52 percent of the seats in the Parliament, making this the Socialists' largest ever victory in terms of vote percentage and seat count as of 2022.

The centre-right parties, mainly the Social Democrats, were punished for their performance in government, and lost more than 11 percentage points they had garnered in the previous election. On the left, the Left Bloc achieved its best result ever and made the biggest climb, gaining 5 MPs, while the CDU (Communists and the Greens) gained 2 MPs and reversed their downward trend of the last elections.

Voter turnout was the highest since 1995, as 64.3 percent of the electorate cast a ballot.

== Background ==
In the aftermath of the 2002 legislative election, PSD and CDS–PP formed a coalition government, the first coalition between both parties in nearly 20 years. During this period, several events dominated the coalition's term in office: The weak economic situation of the country; Portugal becoming a major ally of the United States in the War in Iraq, which split public opinion and also put the government at odds with president Sampaio; New developments in the Moderna corruption case, allegedly involving minister Paulo Portas; And the Casa Pia child sexual abuse scandal, during 2003, in which several high-profile names, from celebrities to Socialist members very close to party's leadership, then chaired by Eduardo Ferro Rodrigues, were arrested.

After more than two years in office, Prime Minister José Manuel Durão Barroso announced, in June 2004, that he was resigning from office in order to become President of the European Commission. Pedro Santana Lopes succeeded Durão Barroso as Prime Minister.

=== Fall of the government ===
Deep disagreements and disputes within the Social Democratic Party, coupled with poor administration, began to derail the government led by Pedro Santana Lopes, the successor of Durão Barroso as prime minister. One of them broke in October 2004, the so-called "Caso Marcelo", regarding former PSD leader Marcelo Rebelo de Sousa's TVI punditry show, which ended abruptly with him accusing TVI's management of pressuring him not to be too critical of the then PSD/CDS–PP government in his television commentaries, being considered as an attack on freedom of the press. Problems at the start of the 2004 school year, due to issues related to teacher allocation, also hampered the government.

Another major dispute was the resignation of Youth and Sports Minister, Henrique Chaves, which was a close ally of Santana, and precipitated the fall of the government, as Chaves accused Santana of not being "loyal and truthful". Following this, President Jorge Sampaio had "enough" of crises and accused the government of "contradictions and lack of coordination that contributed to its discredit". Therefore, Sampaio used his power of dissolution of Parliament and called a snap election, the only time till date such extreme power was used by a president in Portuguese democracy. A new election was called, by the President, for February 2005.

=== Leadership changes and challenges ===
==== Social Democratic Party ====
Following the resignation of José Manuel Durão Barroso as Prime Minister and PSD leader, the Social Democratic Party (PSD) initiated the process to elect a new leader. Pedro Santana Lopes, by then Mayor of Lisbon, was the sole candidate for the leadership and his name was overwhelmingly confirmed in a National Party Council meeting on 1 July 2004. The results were the following:

Ballot: 1 July 2004
Candidate	Votes	%
Pedro Santana Lopes	98	97.0
Against	3	3.0
Turnout	101	
Source: Results

Two weeks later, on 17 July 2004, Santana Lopes was sworn in as Prime Minister.

==== Socialist Party ====
On early July 2004, PS leader Eduardo Ferro Rodrigues resigned from the leadership against President Jorge Sampaio decision to nominate Pedro Santana Lopes as Prime Minister, following the resignation of Durão Barroso, rather than calling a snap legislative election. New elections to select a new leader were called for 25 and 26 September 2004. Former environment minister José Sócrates, Manuel Alegre and the son of former President Mário Soares, João Soares, contested the leadership ballot. José Sócrates was elected by a landslide and the results were the following:

Ballot: 25 and 26 September 2004
Candidate	Votes	%
José Sócrates	28,984	79.5
Manuel Alegre	5,693	15.6
João Soares	1,505	4.1
Blank/Invalid ballots	271	0.7
Turnout	36,453	48.20
Source: Results

==== Portuguese Communist Party ====
In the fall of 2004, PCP leader Carlos Carvalhas decided to step down from the party's leadership after 12 years in the post. Jerónimo de Sousa was selected as candidate for the leadership and was elected in the party's congress during the weekend of 27 and 28 November 2004. The results were the following:

Ballot: 27 November 2004
Candidate	Votes	%
Jerónimo de Sousa	164	93.7
Against	1	0.6
Abstention	10	5.7
Turnout	175	
Source: Results

=== Electoral system ===
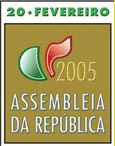
Official logo of the election.

The Assembly of the Republic has 230 members elected to four-year terms. Governments do not require absolute majority support of the Assembly to hold office, as even if the number of opposers of government is larger than that of the supporters, the number of opposers still needs to be equal or greater than 116 (absolute majority) for both the Government's Programme to be rejected or for a motion of no confidence to be approved.

The number of seats assigned to each district depends on the district magnitude. The use of the d'Hondt method makes for a higher effective threshold than certain other allocation methods such as the Hare quota or Sainte-Laguë method, which are more generous to small parties.

For these elections, and compared with the 2002 elections, the MPs distributed by districts were the following:

District	Number of MPs	Map
Lisbon	48	
Porto	38	
Braga	18	
Setúbal	17	
Aveiro	15	
Leiria, Santarém and Coimbra	10	
Viseu	9	
Faro	8	
Madeira^{(+1)} and Viana do Castelo	6	
Azores, Castelo Branco and Vila Real	5	
Bragança and Guarda	4	
Beja and Évora	3	
Portalegre^{(–1)}, Europe and Outside Europe	2	

== Parties ==
Having been in a governing coalition for the past 3 years, the possibility of a PSD/CDS–PP coalition was debated, but it generated many divisions within the Social Democrats (PSD) and the idea was abandoned. Despite this, the PSD signed an agreement with the Earth Party (MPT) and the People's Monarchist Party (PPM), in which it would accept the inclusion of some members of these parties on the PSD's electoral lists. The table below lists the parties represented in the Assembly of the Republic during the 9th legislature (2002–2005) and that also partook in the election:

Name		Ideology	Political position	Leader	2002 result	
Name		Ideology	Political position	Leader	%	Seats
PPD/PSD	Social Democratic Party; Partido Social Democrata	Conservatism; Classical liberalism	Centre-right	Pedro Santana Lopes	40.2%	105 / 230
PS	Socialist Party; Partido Socialista	Social democracy Third Way	Centre-left to Centre	José Sócrates	37.8%	96 / 230
CDS–PP	CDS – People's Party; Centro Democrático e Social – Partido Popular	Christian democracy Conservatism	Centre-right to right-wing	Paulo Portas	8.7%	14 / 230
PCP	Portuguese Communist Party; Partido Comunista Português	Communism; Marxism–Leninism	Far-left	Jerónimo de Sousa	6.9% (Note: The Portuguese Communist Party (PCP) and the Ecologist Party "The Greens" (PEV) contested the 2002 election in a coalition called Unitary Democratic Coalition (CDU) and won a combined 6.9% of the vote and elected 12 MPs to parliament.)	10 / 230
PEV	Ecologist Party "The Greens"; Partido Ecologista "Os Verdes"	Eco-socialism; Green politics	Left-wing	Heloísa Apolónia	6.9%	2 / 230
BE	Left Bloc; Bloco de Esquerda	Democratic socialism Anti-capitalism	Left-wing	Francisco Louçã	2.7%	3 / 230

== Campaign period ==
=== Issues ===
The campaign started officially on 6 February and the major topics were the problematic state of the country's finances, unemployment, abortion and even José Sócrates' alleged homosexuality. The Socialist Party (PS) campaign focused more on Sócrates' leadership attributes rather than in real policies, refusing to announce tax cuts but, however, promising to create thousands of new jobs. On the other hand, the PSD campaign was marked by internal divisions and the weak leadership image conveyed by Pedro Santana Lopes as Prime Minister. The campaign was also noticeable, during its last few days, for the forced absence of Unitary Democratic Coalition (CDU) leader Jerónimo de Sousa due to losing his voice, and the suspension of some campaign events, mostly by right-wing parties, following the death of Sister Lúcia.

=== Party slogans ===
Party or alliance	Original slogan	English translation	Refs
PSD	« Por amor a Portugal. »	"For love of Portugal"	
PS	« Voltar a acreditar em Portugal »	"Believing in Portugal again"	
CDS–PP	« O voto útil para Portugal »	"The useful vote for Portugal"	
CDU	« Agora é consigo »	"Now it's up to you"	
BE	« Faz toda a diferença »	"It makes all the difference"	

=== Candidates' debates ===
2005 Portuguese legislative election debates
Date	Organisers	Moderator(s)	P Present A Absent invitee N Non-invitee					
Date	Organisers	Moderator(s)	PSD Santana	PS Sócrates	CDS–PP Portas	CDU Jerónimo	BE Louçã	Refs
18 Jan	SIC Notícias		N	N	N	P	P	
20 Jan	SIC Notícias		N	N	P	N	P	
25 Jan	SIC Notícias		N	N	P	P	N	
3 Feb	RTP2, SIC, Antena 1, TSF	Maria Flor Pedroso; Rodrigo Guedes de Carvalho; José Gomes Ferreira; Ricardo Costa	P	P	N	N	N	
15 Feb	RTP1	Judite de Sousa; José Alberto Carvalho	P	P	P	P	P	
Candidate viewed as "most convincing" in each debate
Date	Organisers	Polling firm/Link						
Date	Organisers	Polling firm/Link	PSD	PS	CDS–PP	CDU	BE	Notes
3 Feb	RTP2, SIC, Antena 1, TSF	Aximage	20.2	50.4	—N/a	—N/a	—N/a	29.6% Tie

== Opinion polling ==
View source data.

== Voter turnout ==
The table below shows voter turnout throughout election day including voters from Overseas.

Turnout	Time								
Turnout	12:00			16:00			19:00		
Turnout	2002	2005	±	2002	2005	±	2002	2005	±
Total	18.00%	21.93%	▲3.93 pp	45.88%	50.94%	▲5.06 pp	61.48%	64.26%	▲2.78 pp

== Results ==
=== National summary ===
Party	Votes	%	+/–	Seats	+/–
Socialist Party	2,588,312	45.03	+7.23	121	+25
Social Democratic Party (Note: From the Social Democratic electoral lists were elected two MPs from the People's Monarchist Party and other two MPs from Earth Party.)	1,653,425	28.77	–11.44	75	–30
Unitary Democratic Coalition (Note: Portuguese Communist Party (12 MPs) and "The Greens" (2 MPs).)	433,369	7.54	+0.60	14	+2
CDS – People's Party	416,415	7.24	–1.48	12	–2
Left Bloc	364,971	6.35	+3.61	8	+5
Portuguese Workers' Communist Party	48,186	0.84	+0.18	0	0
New Democracy Party	40,358	0.70	New	0	New
Humanist Party	17,056	0.30	+0.09	0	0
National Renovator Party	9,374	0.16	+0.07	0	0
Workers' Party of Socialist Unity	5,535	0.10	+0.02	0	0
Democratic Party of the Atlantic	1,618	0.03	New	0	New
Total	5,578,619	100.00	–	230	0
Valid votes	5,578,619	97.06	–0.97		
Invalid votes	65,515	1.14	+0.18		
Blank votes	103,537	1.80	+0.79		
Total votes	5,747,671	100.00	–		
Registered voters/turnout	8,944,508	64.26	+2.79		
Source: Comissão Nacional de Eleições

Vote share
PS	45.03%
PSD	28.77%
CDU	7.54%
CDS-PP	7.24%
BE	6.35%
PCTP/MRPP	0.84%
PND	0.70%
Others	0.59%
Blank/Invalid	2.94%

Parliamentary seats
PS	52.61%
PSD	32.61%
CDU	6.09%
CDS-PP	5.22%
BE	3.48%

=== Distribution by constituency ===
Results of the 2005 election of the Portuguese Assembly of the Republic by constituency
Constituency	%	S	%	S	%	S	%	S	%	S	Total S
Constituency	PS		PSD		CDU		CDS-PP		BE		Total S
Azores	53.1	3	34.4	2	1.7	-	4.0	-	2.9	-	5
Aveiro	41.1	8	35.7	6	3.5	-	9.8	1	5.1	-	15
Beja	51.0	2	12.3	-	24.1	1	2.9	-	4.7	-	3
Braga	45.4	9	32.9	7	4.8	1	7.8	1	4.6	-	18
Bragança	42.1	2	39.0	2	2.0	-	9.7	-	2.5	-	4
Castelo Branco	56.0	4	26.7	1	3.8	-	5.3	-	3.7	-	5
Coimbra	45.4	6	31.9	4	5.5	-	5.5	-	6.3	-	10
Évora	49.7	2	16.7	-	20.9	1	3.7	-	4.6	-	3
Faro	49.3	6	24.6	2	6.9	-	5.8	-	7.7	-	8
Guarda	46.8	2	34.7	2	2.9	-	7.0	-	3.4	-	4
Leiria	35.6	4	39.8	5	4.6	-	8.9	1	5.5	-	10
Lisbon	44.1	23	23.7	12	9.8	5	8.2	4	8.8	4	48
Madeira	35.0	3	45.2	3	3.6	-	6.6	-	3.8	-	6
Portalegre	54.9	2	20.2	-	12.1	-	4.2	-	4.6	-	2
Porto	48.5	20	27.8	12	5.4	2	6.9	2	6.7	2	38
Santarém	46.1	6	26.4	3	8.6	1	6.9	-	6.5	-	10
Setúbal	43.6	8	16.1	3	20.0	3	5.1	1	10.3	2	17
Viana do Castelo	42.0	3	33.5	2	3.8	-	11.4	1	4.5	-	6
Vila Real	43.8	3	40.2	2	2.6	-	6.8	-	2.4	-	5
Viseu	40.4	4	40.2	4	2.2	-	8.6	1	3.3	-	9
Europe	54.3	1	27.2	1	4.2	-	3.4	-	2.3	-	2
Outside Europe	26.3	-	57.7	2	1.0	-	3.5	-	0.7	-	2
Total	45.0	121	28.8	75	7.5	14	7.2	12	6.4	8	230
Source: Comissão Nacional de Eleições

=== Maps ===
Winner and seats by constituency.

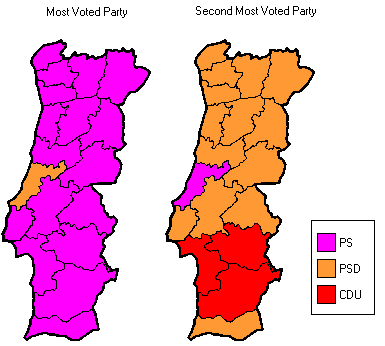
First and second most voted political force by constituency.

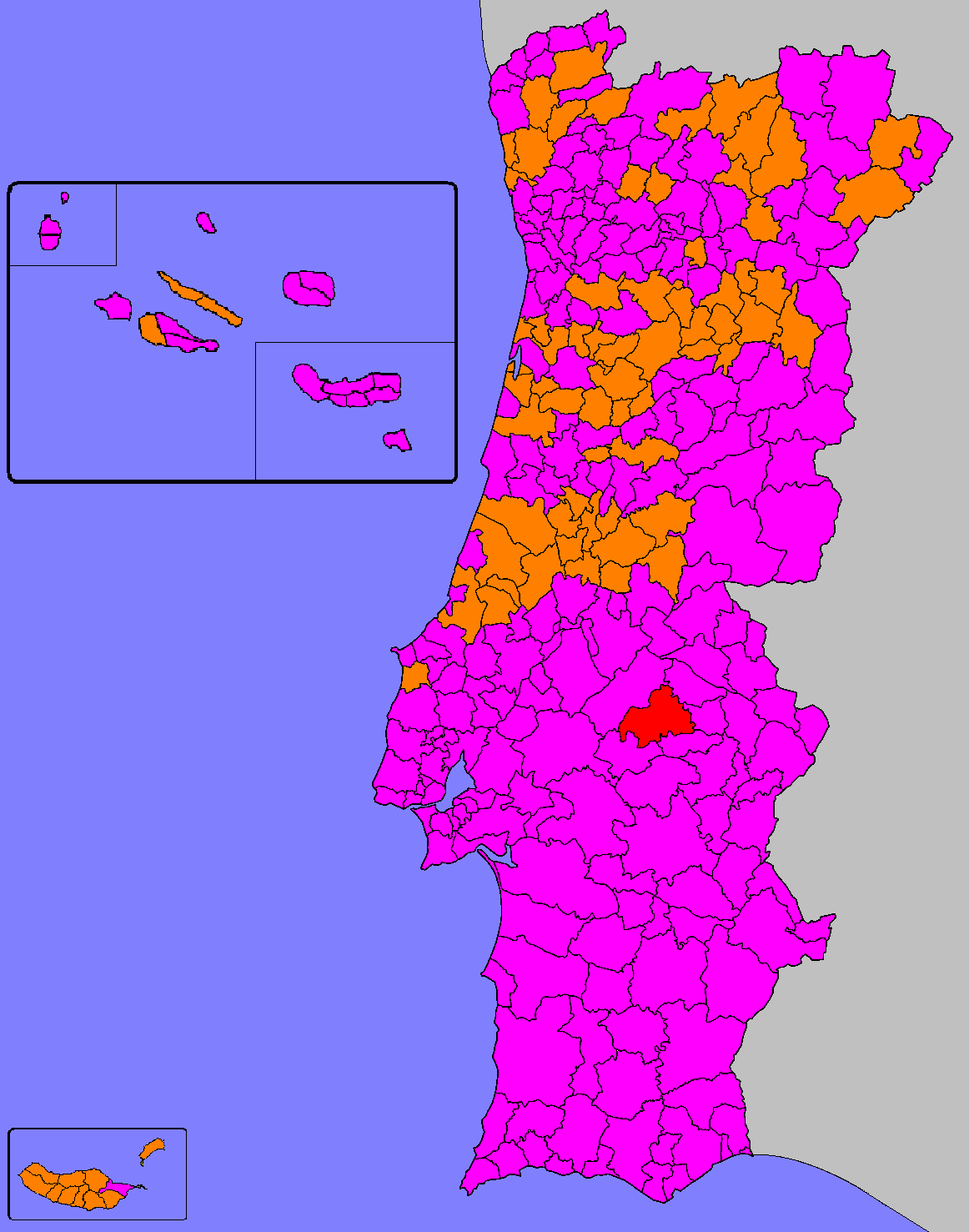
Most voted political force by municipality.

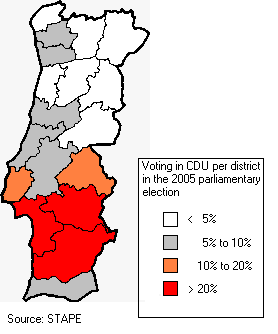
Share of vote for CDU by district.

=== Graphics ===
Seats won by party.

Gains and losses by party.

Share of vote by party.

== See also ==
- Politics of Portugal
- List of political parties in Portugal
- Elections in Portugal
