= João Soares (politician) =

Portuguese politician (born 1949)

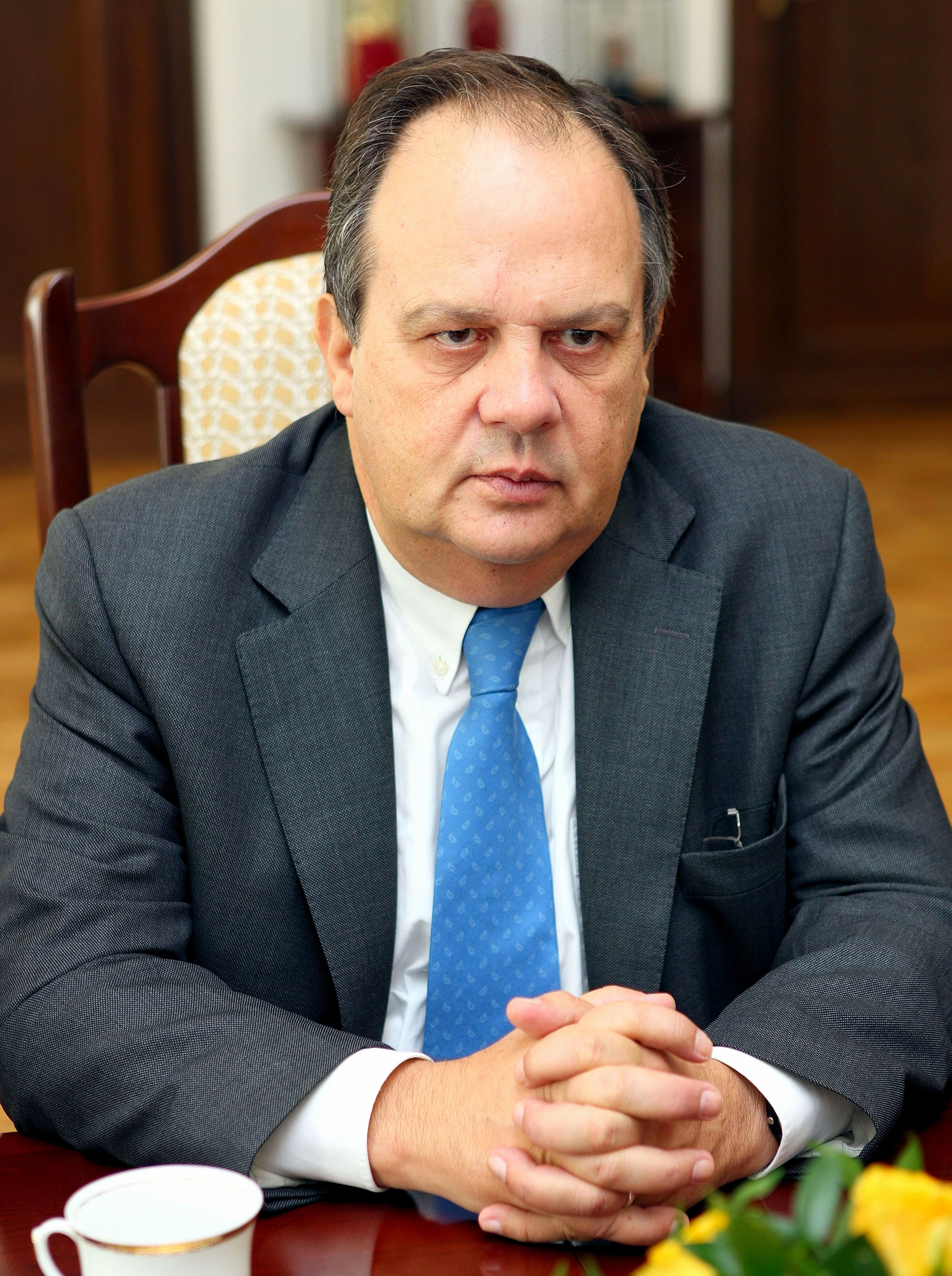

Minister of Culture
- In office 26 November 2015 – 8 April 2016
- Prime Minister: António Costa
- Preceded by: Teresa Morais
- Succeeded by: Luís Filipe Castro Mendes

Mayor of Lisbon
- In office 15 November 1995 – 23 January 2002
- Preceded by: Jorge Sampaio
- Succeeded by: Pedro Santana Lopes

Member of the Assembly of the Republic
- In office 4 April 2002 – 24 October 2019
- Constituency: Lisbon (2002–2009); Faro (2009–2015); Lisbon (2015–2019)
- In office 19 July 1987 – 6 October 1991
- Constituency: Lisbon

Personal details
- Born: João Barroso Soares; 29 August 1949 (age 77) Lisbon
- Party: Socialist Party
- Spouse(s): Maria Olímpia (divorced) Annick Burhenne
- Children: 5
- Parents: Mário Soares (father); Maria Barroso (mother)
- Education: University of Lisbon
- Occupation: Politician
- Profession: Editor

João Barroso Soares (born 29 August 1949 in São Cristóvão e São Lourenço, Lisbon) is a Portuguese editor and Socialist Party politician, who was President of the Municipality of Lisbon from 1995 to 2002. He was member of the European Parliament and of the Portuguese State Council.

== Personal life ==
He is the son of the former Portuguese Prime Minister and President, Mário Soares, and the actress Maria Barroso. He was married to Maria Olímpia Soares (b. 1951), daughter of António Domingos de Oliveira Soares and wife Clotilde Soares, by whom he had three children: Maria Inês (b. 1976), Maria Mafalda (b. 1981) and Mário Alberto (b. 1987). Later divorced, he married the Belgian Annick Burhenne, by whom he had a son Jonas (b. 2003), named after Jonas Savimbi, of whom João Soares is an admirer, and a daughter Lilah (b. 2007).

== Career ==
In 2004, he lost to Manuel Alegre and José Sócrates a bid for the party leadership, and in October 2005 lost to Fernando Seara the election for President of the Municipality of Sintra. He also lost the election for president of the Municipality of Lisbon to Pedro Santana Lopes, in 2001, being the first mayor of Lisboa to lose a reelection.

In July 2008 he was elected President of the OSCE Parliamentary Assembly. He was reelected for another one-year term in July 2009.

During the 2008 and 2012 United States elections, he acted as the special coordinator for the OSCE International Observation Mission.

=== Controversy ===
In April 2016, in a Facebook post, João Soares, Minister of Culture, said that he looked forward to landing "salutary blows" on two newspaper columnists. The post attracted hundreds of critical comments from the public, opposition politicians and journalists. Mr Soares, resigned after Prime Minister António Costa reprimanded him and issued a public apology. He initially defended his comments as a response to an "insulting personal attack", but later apologised.

== Electoral history ==
=== Lisbon City Council election, 1997 ===
Ballot: 14 December 1997
Party	Candidate	Votes	%	Seats	+/−
PS/CDU/UDP	João Soares	165,072	51.9	10	–1
PSD/CDS–PP	Ferreira do Amaral	124,866	39.3	7	+1
PSR/PXXI	Francisco Louçã	8,315	2.6	0	new
PCTP/MRPP	–	6,070	1.9	0	±0
Blank/Invalid ballots		13,799	4.3	–	–
Turnout		318,102	48.29	17	±0
Source: Autárquicas 1997

=== Lisbon City Council election, 2001 ===
Ballot: 16 December 2001
Party	Candidate	Votes	%	Seats	+/−
PSD/PPM	Pedro Santana Lopes	131,094	42.1	8	+1
PS/CDU	João Soares	129,368	41.5	8	–2
CDS–PP	Paulo Portas	23,637	7.6	1	±0
BE	Miguel Portas	11,899	3.8	0	new
Other parties		5,766	1.9	0	±0
Blank/Invalid ballots		9,718	3.1	–	–
Turnout		311,482	54.83	17	±0
Source: Autárquicas 2001

=== PS leadership election, 2004 ===
Ballot: 25 and 26 September 2004
Candidate	Votes	%
José Sócrates	28,984	79.5
Manuel Alegre	5,693	15.6
João Soares	1,505	4.1
Blank/Invalid ballots	271	0.7
Turnout	36,453	48.20
Source: Acção Socialista

== Honours ==
- Chile: Grand Cross of the Order of Bernardo O'Higgins (30 September 2001)
