= RTP Informação =

Logo of RTP Informação

RTP Informação is the department of the Rádio e Televisão de Portugal, a Portuguese public broadcaster, responsible for the gathering and broadcasting of news and current affairs.

Originally two separate news departments of Radiodifusão Portuguesa, the radio broadcaster, and Radiotelevisão Portuguesa, the television broadcaster, respectively, those were merged in 2004, becoming a part of the then-newly merged Rádio e Televisão de Portugal. On 19 September 2011, the department began emphasizing themselves, with the newly rebranded television channel of the same name and adding their name in the intro sequence of their newscasts on RTP1 and RTP Informação.
