= Fernando Rosas =

Portuguese historian and politician (born 1946)

Fernando Rosas ComL
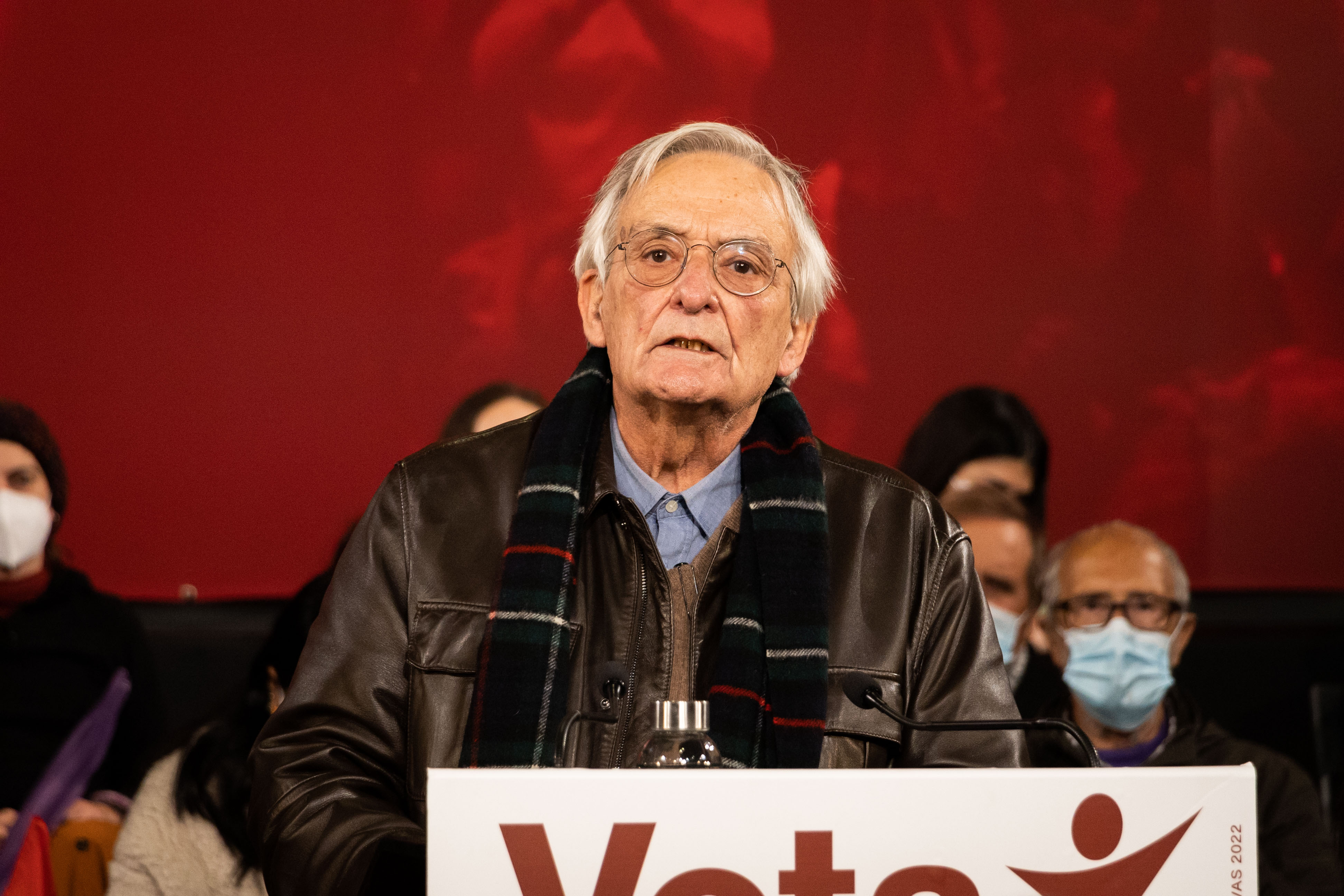
- Rosas in 2022

Member of the Assembly of the Republic
- In office 10 March 2005 – 19 June 2011
- Constituency: Setúbal
- In office 25 October 1999 – 4 April 2002
- Constituency: Lisbon

Personal details
- Born: Fernando José Mendes Rosas; 18 April 1946 (age 80) Lisbon, Portugal
- Party: BE (1999–present)
- Other political affiliations: PCP (1961–1968); MRPP (1970–1980); PSR (1985–1999)
- Education: University of Lisbon; NOVA University Lisbon
- Occupation: Historian • Professor • Politician
- Awards: Order of Liberty (2006)

Fernando José Mendes Rosas ComL (born 18 April 1946) is a Portuguese historian, professor and politician, being one of the founders of the Left Bloc.

== Biography ==
=== Early life and education ===
Rosas was born on 18 April 1946. He studied at Pedro Nunes secondary school, and in 1961, he joined the school's Portuguese Communist Party organization, a party for which he was later a militant.

He entered University of Lisbon's Faculty of Law where he remained an active militant. He was arrested in the repressive wave of January, 1965, while he was directing the student association of his Faculty. The Estado Novo arrested dozens of activists from the main board of student resistance. He was tried and convicted in 1965. He served one year and three months at a correctional facility. As he left this facility he dedicated himself to supporting activities for arrested politicians.

=== Political career ===
The events of May 1968, and the Soviet invasion of Czechoslovakia, in August of the same year, led him to opt for the abandonment of the Communist Party. He participated in Portugal's first public protest against the Vietnam War, supported by sectors that were linked to the Students' Democratic Left-Wing, organization which he helped found in late 1968. It was as a politician responsible for this party that he organized the 1969 protests in Lisbon. He also participated in the second protest (this time centred on Coimbra).

In August 1971, he was arrested for the second time and taken to the headquarters of the PIDE political police. He was submitted to sleep torture for several days and then the regime's courts convicted him to 14 months at a correctional facility.

Upon his release, he returned to anti-fascist activism. In March 1973, he actively supported the campaign for the accusation of the murder of African socialist politician Amílcar Cabral. After a renewed attempt by the PIDE to imprison him, he escaped and went "underground" until the Carnation Revolution on 25 April 1974.

Rosas took part in the foundation of the maoist Re-Organized Movement of the Party of the Proletariat (MRPP) in 1970, along with figures such as Arnaldo Matos. Up to 1979 he was editor of the Luta Popular newspaper ("People's struggle" in English). He represented this organization both times Ramalho Eanes ran for the presidency. During his time as a member of MRPP, Rosas was a candidate for Mayor of Lisbon in the 1976 local elections, getting 4,087 votes and 0.92% of the votes. He was later expelled from the party in 1980.

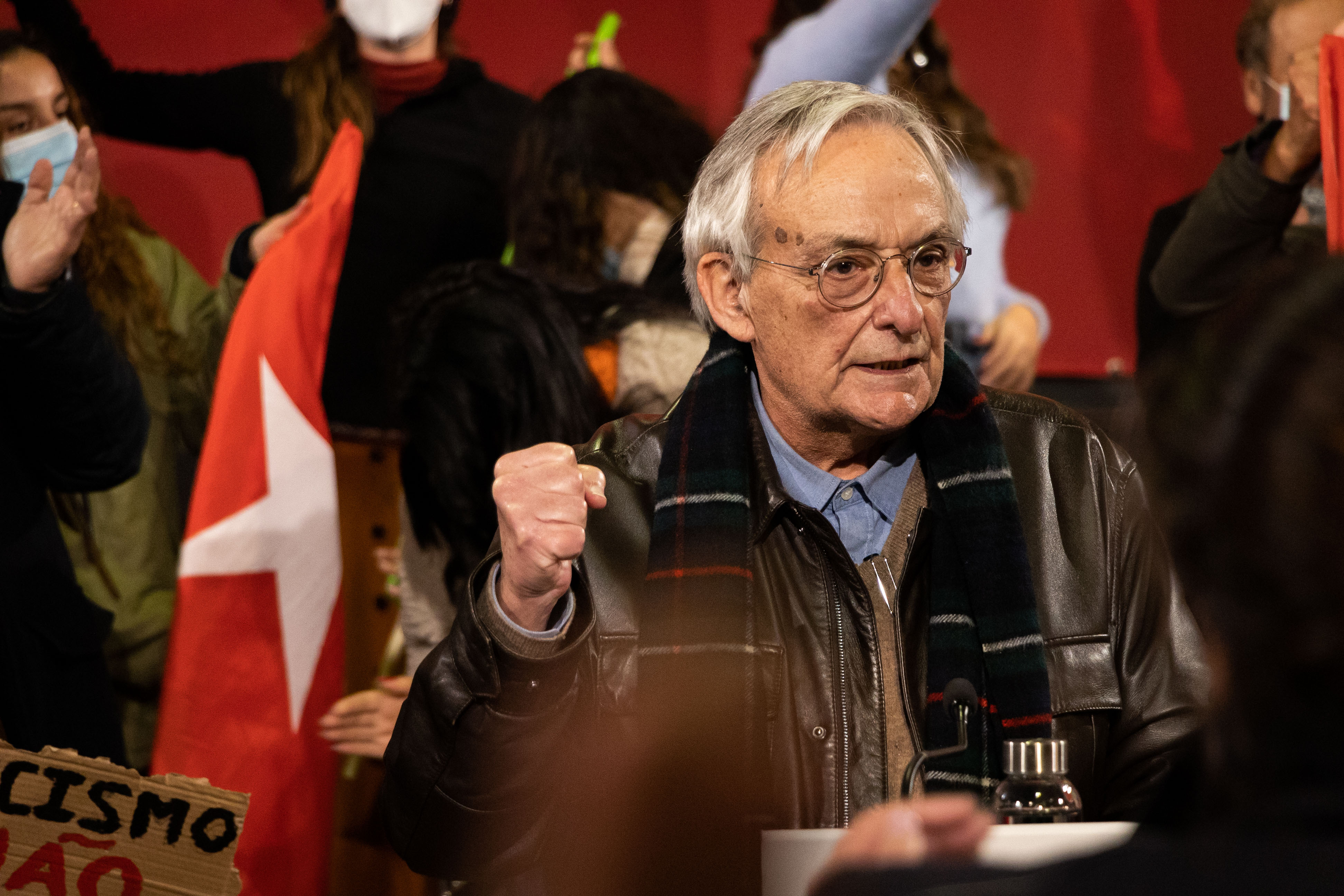
Fernando Rosas in a Left Bloc rally for the 2022 legislative election

After being expelled from MRPP, Rosas grew closer to the Revolutionary Socialist Party (PSR), led by Francisco Louçã, being a candidate from the party from 1985 onwards, as an independent.

In the 1996 presidential election, Rosas belonged to the Political Committee for the presidential candidacy of Jorge Sampaio.

In 1999, with Francisco Louçã from the PSR, Luís Fazenda from the UDP and Miguel Portas from Politics XXI, Rosas became one of the founders of the Left Bloc (BE), becoming the leader of its Permanent Commission. Following the same year's legislative election, in which the Left Bloc entered Parliament by winning 2 seats, Rosas became a Member of the Assembly of the Republic from Lisbon.

Rosas was a candidate in the 2001 presidential election, being supported by the Left Bloc. He finished fourth, with 129,840 votes and 3.00% of the votes, being defeated by Jorge Sampaio, who was seeking reelection.

In 2002 he was the main candidate of the BE in Setúbal, failing to be elected. In 2005 he was once again the main candidate in Setúbal, this time being elected as a member of the Assembly of the Republic. Rosas was reelected in 2009, resigning to his seat in 2010 to dedicate himself to teaching and research as a historian.

In 2025, along with other BE founders Francisco Louçã and Luís Fazenda, he was announced as the main candidate for the Leiria District in that year's legislative election.

=== Academic and journalistic career ===
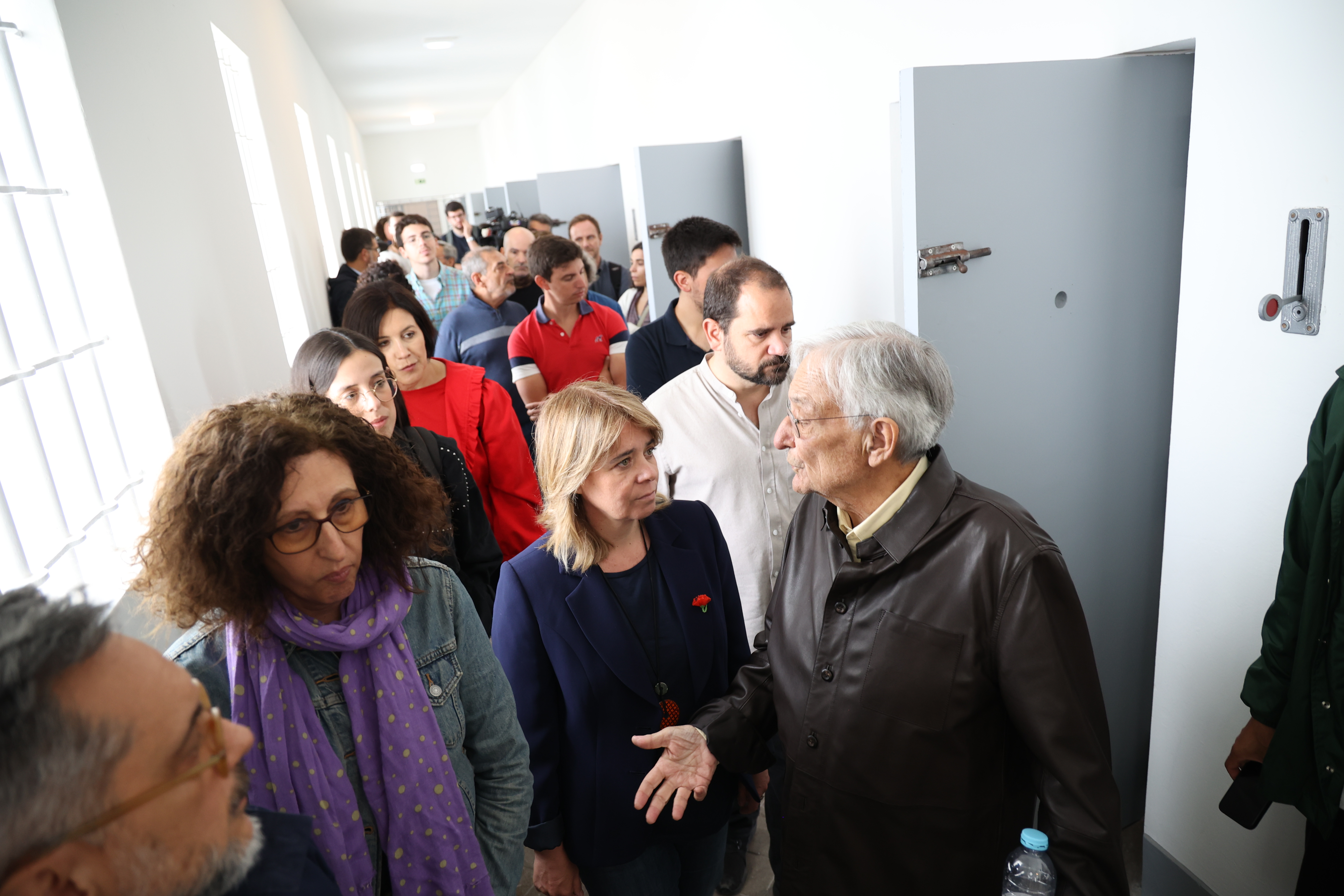
Rosas with Catarina Martins and José Gusmão in a visit to the Peniche Fortress during the campaign for the 2024 European election

In 1981, Fernando Rosas returned to University and began dedicating himself to journalism as a profession. He coordinated the history page of Diário de Notícias and its cultural supplement. His collaboration with DN continued until 1992, a time when he integrated the fortnightly column of the pages of Público, another newspaper. In 1986 he finished a Master's Degree in Contemporary History (19th and 20th century), getting his Ph.D. in 1990.

Rosas served as the president of the Institute of Contemporary History (IHC) between 1994 and 2013, historical consultant for the Mário Soares Foundation and the director of História magazine between 1994 and 2007.

He was invited to be assistant professor by the Faculty of Social and Human Sciences of NOVA University of Lisbon, becoming a cathedratic professor in 2003. After teaching his last lesson in April 2016, Rosas was invited as a guest to keep teaching History of Fascism. In 2019, Rosas became professor emeritus of the NOVA FCSH, the first person to receive that honour.

Rosas is a member of the Executive Commission of the Resistance and Freedom National Museum at the Peniche Fortress, where he was arrested during the Estado Novo regime.

== Honours ==
- Commander of the Order of Liberty (30 January 2006)

== Selected works ==
- As primeiras eleições legislativas sob o Estado Novo : as eleições de 16 de Dezembro de 1934, Cadernos O Jornal, 1985
- O Estado Novo nos Anos 30, Lisbon, Estampa, 1986
- O salazarismo e a Aliança Luso-Britânica : estudos sobre a política externa do Estado Novo nos anos 30 a 40, Lisbon, Fragmentos 1988
- Salazar e o Salazarismo (with JM Brandão de Brito), Publicacoes Dom Quixote, 1989, ISBN 978-972-20-0758-0
- Portugal Entre a Paz e a Guerra (1939/45), Lisbon, Estampa, 1990
- Portugal e o Estado Novo (1930/60), Vol. XII (ed), Nova História de Portugal, (gen. ed. A. H. de Oliveira Marques e Joel Serra), Lisbon, Editorial Presença, 1992
- O Estado Novo (1926/74), vol. VII, História Portugal (ed. J. Mattoso), 1994
- Dicionário de História do Estado Novo (with JM Brandão de Brito, ed.), Lisbon, Bertrand Editora, 1996
- Portugal e a Guerra Civil de Espanha (ed), Colibri, 1996, ISBN 978-972-772-016-3
- Armindo Monteiro e Oliveira Salazar : correspondência política, 1926-1955 (ed.), Lisbon, Estampa, 1996, ISBN 978-972-33-1182-2
- Salazarismo e Fomento Económico, Lisbon, Noticias, 2000
- Portugal Século XX : Pensamento e Acção Política, Lisbon, Noticias, 2004
- Lisboa Revolucionária, Lisbon, Tinta da China, 2007, ISBN 978-972-8955-45-8
- História da Primeira República Portuguesa (with Maria Fernanda Rollo), Lisbon, Tinta da China, 2009, ISBN 978-972-8955-98-4
- Salazar e o Poder - A Arte de Saber Durar, Lisbon, Tinta da China, 2013, ISBN 9789896711689
- Salazar e os Fascismos, Lisbon, Tinta da China, 2019, ISBN 9789896714840
