= Death and state funeral of Mário Soares =

2017 state funeral in Lisbon, Portugal

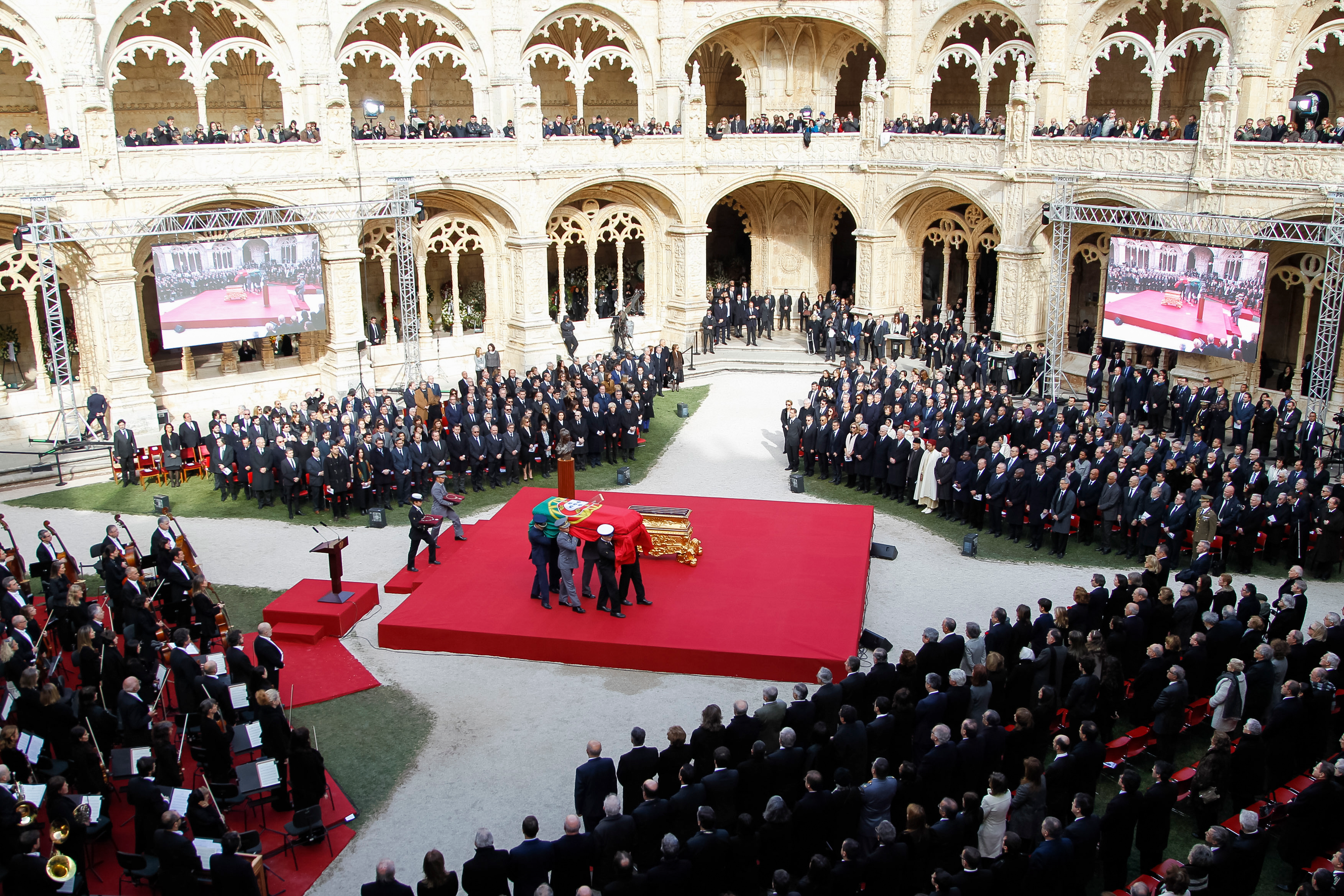
- Date: 7 January 2017 (death); 10 January 2017 (funeral and burial)
- Time: 13:00–16:14 WET (UTC+00:00)
- Duration: 194 minutes
- Venue: Jerónimos Monastery (funeral); Prazeres Cemetery (burial)
- Type: State funeral
- Participants: See § Guests

On 7 January 2017, at 15:28 WET (UTC+0), Mário Soares, former President of Portugal from 1986 to 1996 and Prime Minister from 1976 to 1978 and 1983 to 1985, died at the Red Cross Hospital in Lisbon, at 92 years old, next to his children, João and Isabel Soares. The government declared three days of national mourning.

Soares had been interned at the Red Cross Hospital on 13 December 2016, due to health concerns following an encephalitis. His funeral was held three days after his death, on 10 January 2017.

Soares' state funeral was the first state funeral since the Carnation Revolution, and the first since António de Oliveira Salazar's death in 1970.

== Funeral ==
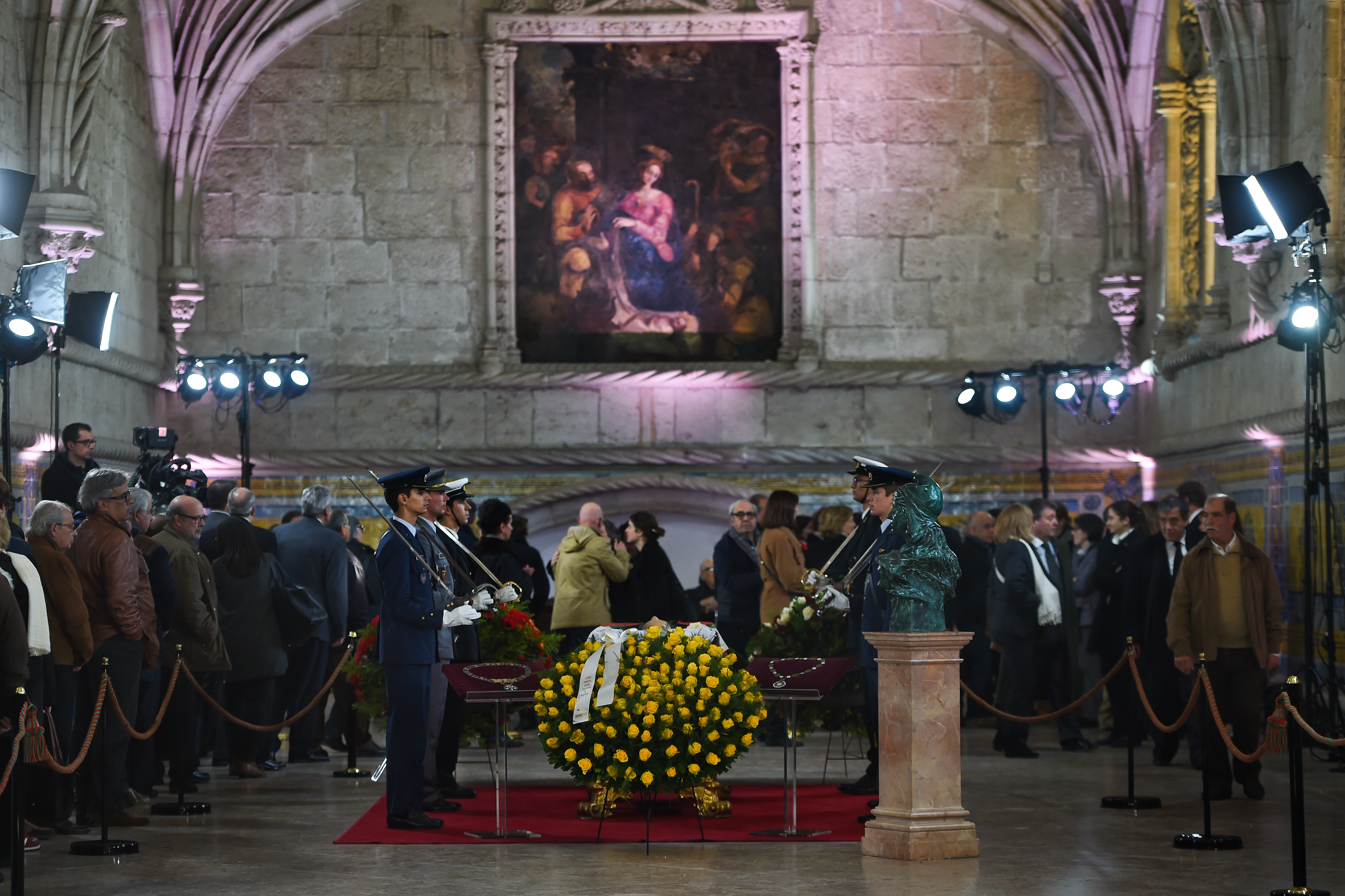
Lying in state of Mário Soares, in the Jerónimos Monastery.

On 9 January 2017, the body of Mário Soares arrived at his house, in Campo Grande, where a procession began to take the body to the Jerónimos Monastery. He then lied in state in the Azulejos Room of the monastery until his funeral.

On 10 January 2017, at 13:00, a solemn session started in the cloister of the Jerónimos Monastery. After a recording of Mário Soares' speech on the signing of the treaty of the Accession of Portugal to the European Community in 1985 was heard, his son, João Soares, delivered his eulogy. This was followed by a poem read by his late wife Maria Barroso, before their daughter Isabel Soares spoke. Prime Minister António Costa, who was on an international trip to India, delivered a message via videoconference, being followed by President of the Assembly of the Republic Eduardo Ferro Rodrigues and finally by President Marcelo Rebelo de Sousa.

At 14:11, the funeral procession began, with the casket going from the Jerónimos to the Belém Palace, the official residence of the President. From then, the procession passed next to the São Bento Palace, the Mário Soares Foundation, and then the Headquarters of the Socialist Party, in the Rato Square.

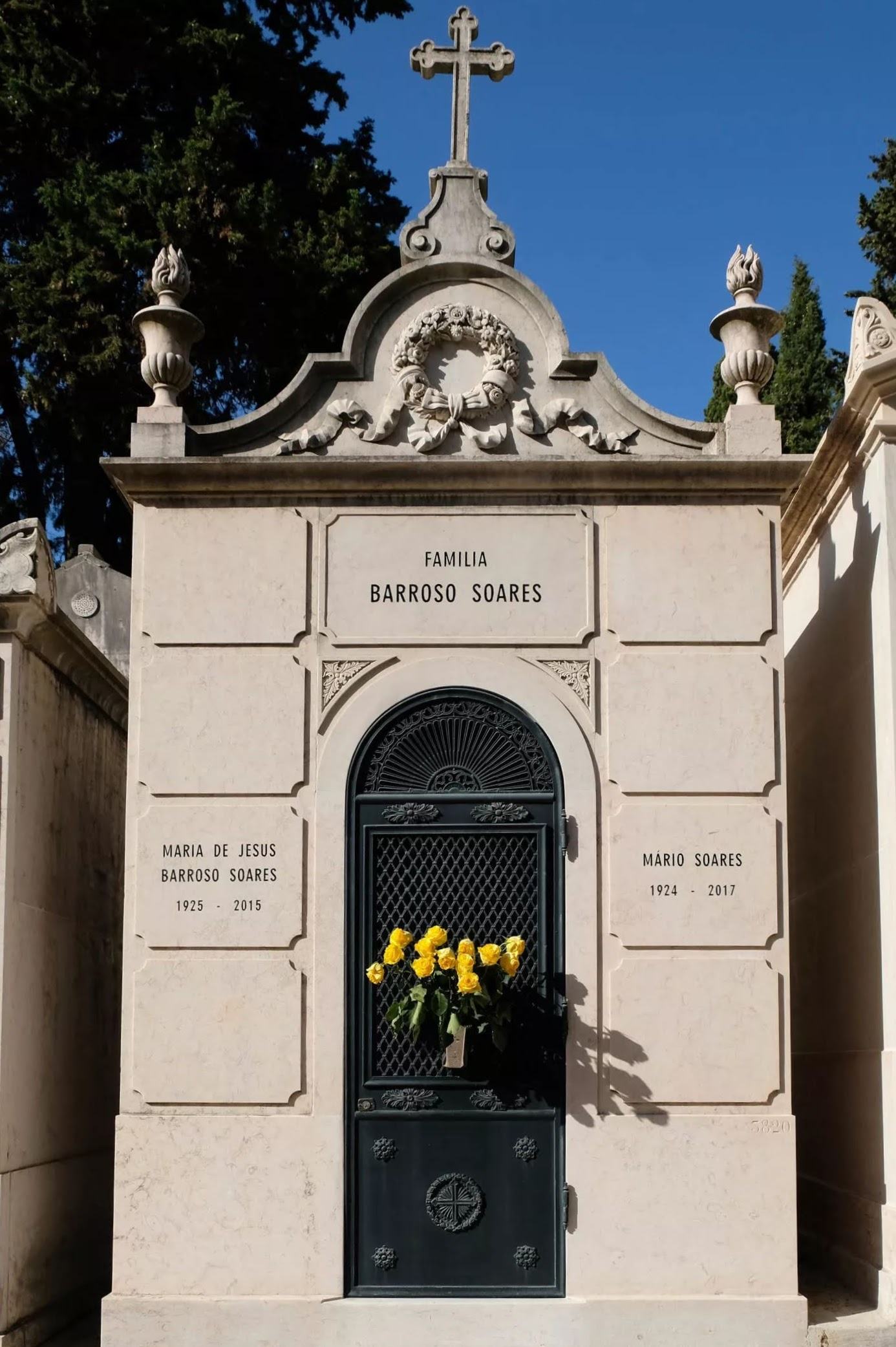
Mausoleum of the Barroso Soares family, where Soares was laid to rest.

At 15:50, the procession arrived at Prazeres Cemetery, where he was laid to rest in a family mausoleum, next to his wife Maria Barroso.

== Guests ==
This is a list of Portuguese and Foreign dignitaries that attended the state funeral.

=== Portugal ===
- Marcelo Rebelo de Sousa, President of the Republic
  - Aníbal Cavaco Silva and Maria Cavaco Silva, former president and First Lady
  - Jorge Sampaio and Maria José Ritta, former president and First Lady
  - António Ramalho Eanes and Manuela Eanes, former president and First Lady
- Eduardo Ferro Rodrigues, President of the Assembly of the Republic
  - Assunção Esteves, former President of the Assembly of the Republic
  - Jaime Gama, former President of the Assembly of the Republic
  - Francisco de Oliveira Dias, former President of the Assembly of the Republic
- José Sócrates, former Prime Minister
- Francisco Pinto Balsemão, former Prime Minister
- Augusto Santos Silva, Minister of Foreign Affairs (representing the Portuguese government in the absence of the Prime Minister)
  - Maria Manuel Leitão Marques, Minister of the Presidency and Administrative Modernization
  - Mário Centeno, Minister of Finance
  - Constança Urbano de Sousa, Minister of Home Affairs
  - Francisca Van Dunem, Minister of Justice
  - Tiago Brandão Rodrigues, Minister of Education
  - Adalberto Campos Fernandes, Minister of Health
  - Pedro Marques, Minister of Infrastructure
  - José António Vieira da Silva, Minister of Labour, Solidarity and Social Security
  - Eduardo Cabrita, Minister in the Cabinet of the Prime Minister
  - Ana Paula Vitorino, Minister of Sea
- Vasco Cordeiro, President of the Regional Government of the Azores
- Miguel Albuquerque, President of the Regional Government of Madeira
- Fernando Medina, Mayor of Lisbon
- Rui Moreira, Mayor of Porto
- Manuel da Costa Andrade, President of the Constitutional Court
- Carlos Moedas, European Commissioner for Research, Science and Innovation
- Vítor Constâncio, Vice President of the European Central Bank
- Carlos César, President of the Socialist Party
  - Jorge Lacão, Vice President of the Assembly of the Republic
  - Ana Catarina Mendes, Secretary-general Adjunct of the Socialist Party
- Pedro Passos Coelho, President of the Social Democratic Party and former Prime Minister
  - José Matos Correia, Vice President of the Assembly of the Republic
  - Luís Montenegro, Parliamentary leader
- Catarina Martins, Coordinator of the Left Bloc
  - José Manuel Pureza, Vice President of the Assembly of the Republic
  - Pedro Filipe Soares, Parliamentary leader
- Assunção Cristas, President of the CDS – People's Party
  - Teresa Caeiro, Vice President of the Assembly of the Republic
  - Nuno Magalhães, Parliamentary leader
- João Oliveira, Parliamentary leader of the Portuguese Communist Party
- Heloísa Apolónia, Parliamentary leader of the Ecologist Party "The Greens"
- André Silva, Spokesperson of People Animals Nature
- Manuel Clemente, Cardinal-Patriarch of Lisbon
- Duarte Pio, Duke of Braganza

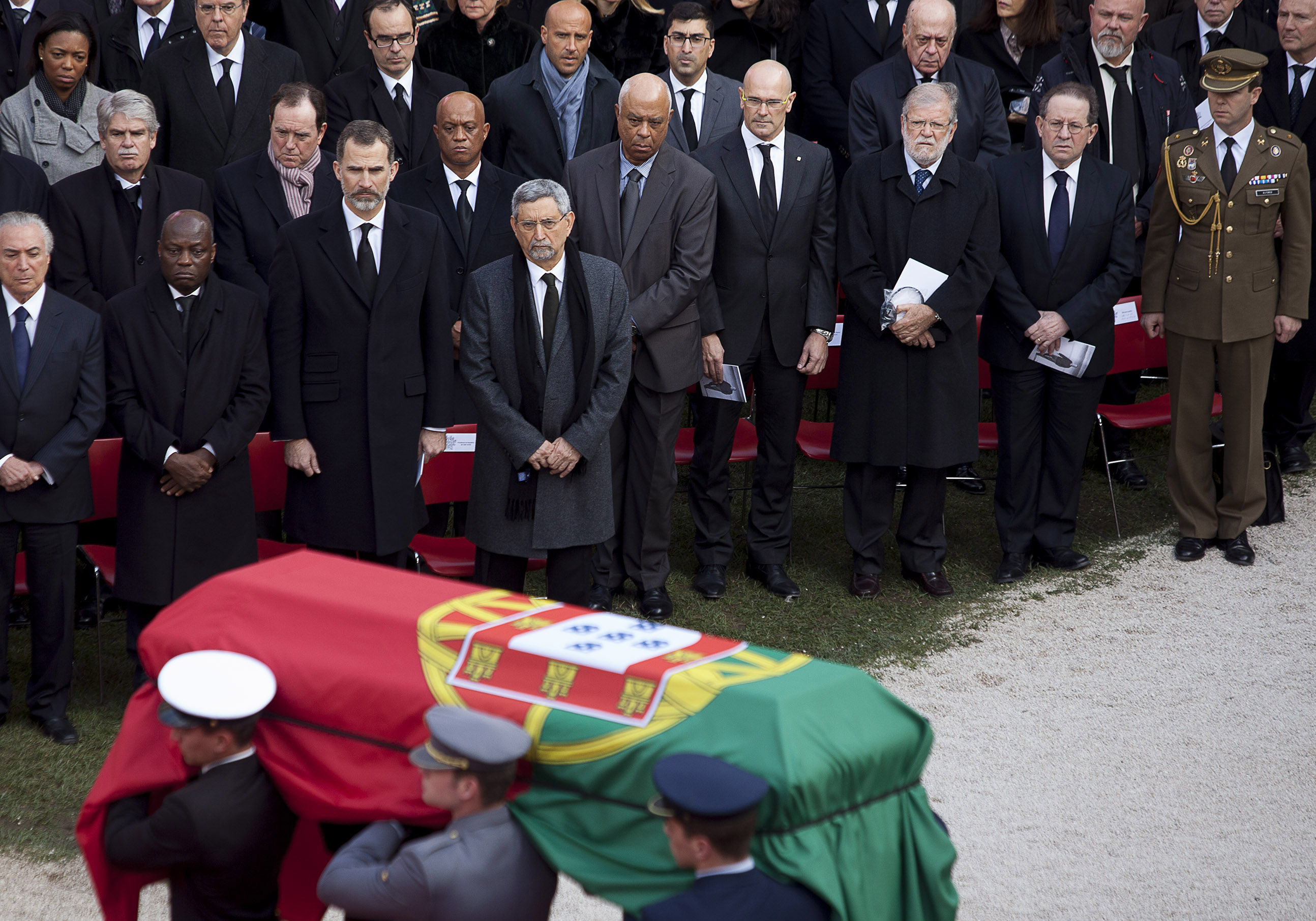
Foreign dignataries at Mário Soares' state funeral.

=== Foreign ===
- (European Union) Martin Schulz, President of the European Parliament
- (European Union) Jacques Santer, former President of the European Commission
- (European Union) Giacomo Filibeck, International Secretary of the Party of European Socialists
- Felipe VI, King of Spain
- Alfonso Dastis, Minister of Foreign Affairs of Spain
- Felipe González, former Prime Minister of Spain
- (Spain) Artur Mas, former President of the Government of Catalonia
- (Spain) Juan Carlos Rodriguez Ibarra, former President of the Regional Government of Extremadura
- (Spain) Ignacio Sánchez Amor, deputy of the Spanish Socialist Workers' Party (PSOE)
- (Spain) Ricardo Cortés, deputy and International Secretary of PSOE
- (Spain) Laura Balarrin, Secretary of International Politics and Cooperation of PSOE
- Michel Temer, President of Brazil
- José Sarney, former President of Brazil
- Fernando da Piedade Dias dos Santos, President of the National Assembly of Angola
- (Angola) Isaías Samakuva, President of UNITA
- Jorge Carlos Fonseca, President of Cape Verde
- Luís Filipe Tavares, Minister of Foreign Affairs of Cape Verde
- José Mário Vaz, President of Guinea-Bissau
- Lionel Jospin, former Prime Minister of France
- Moulay Rachid, Prince of Morocco
- Marcelino Medina González, Deputy Minister of Foreign Affairs of Cuba
- (Italy) Piero Fassino, former Mayor of Turin
- (Chile) Luis Ayala, Secretary-general of the Socialist International
