= Lucrécia de Arriaga =

First Lady of Portugal

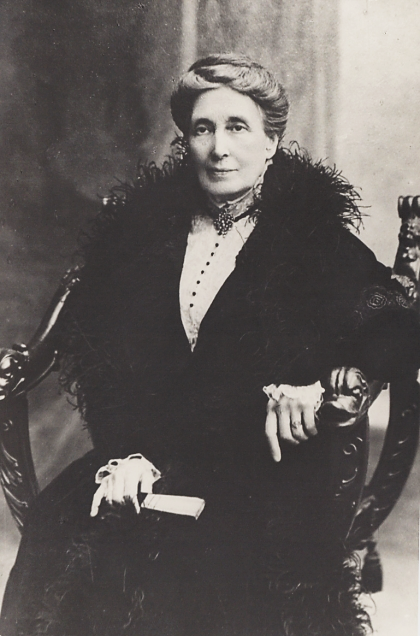

First Lady of Portugal
- In role 24 August 1911 – 29 May 1915
- Succeeded by: Elzira Dantas Machado

Personal details
- Born: November 13, 1844 Figueira da Foz, Coimbra District, Kingdom of Portugal
- Died: October 15, 1927 (aged 82) Parede, Cascais, Portugal
- Spouse: Manuel de Arriaga
- Children: Manuel, Maria Amélia, Maria Cristina, Roque Manuel, Maria Adelaide, Maria Máxima

Lucrécia Augusta de Brito de Berredo Furtado de Melo Arriaga (13 November 1844 – 15 October 1927) was the wife of Manuel de Arriaga, the first President of the Portuguese Republic and was, thus, the first First Lady of Portugal from 1911 to 1915, when her husband resigned from the post.

== Biography ==
Lucrécia was born in Figueira da Foz, the daughter of Roque Francisco Furtado de Melo and his wife Maria Máxima de Brito Leite de Berredo, descendants of Azorean aristocracy. She received a prime education, beffiting of her social status: she spoke English and French, and could play the piano.

She met her future husband, Manuel de Arriaga, in her hometown. They married in 1874, in a chapel near Valença do Minho, where her father was General and Governor. For a few years the couple lived in Coimbra, where Manuel de Arriaga flourished in his law practice. Six children were born, two boys and four girls: Maria Máxima de Melo Arriaga Brum da Silveira (born 20 February 1875), Manuel de Arriaga Brum da Silveira (born 24 March 1879), Maria Amélia de Melo Arriaga Brum da Silveira (born 8 February 1880), Maria Cristina de Arriaga (born 10 April 1882), Roque Manuel de Arriaga (born 18 March 1885), Maria Adelaide de Melo de Arriaga (born 11 April 1887). The family regularly spent their holidays in Buarcos.

On 24 August 1911, her husband became the first President elect of the Portuguese Republic and, by extension, Lucrécia was made the first First Lady of the country, aged sixty-six. In spite of her pro-monarchy convictions, Lucrécia supported her husband, and moved with the family to Belém Palace, where she was mostly dedicated to the home, per the "female habit" of the time. However, the First Lady avoided public exposure and the commemoration of the second anniversary of the Implantation of the Republic, in 1912, was one of the only occasions she took part in a public event. On 4 October 1913, she presided over an afternoon tea for the children of the National Press employees, having been received as the wife of the Head of State. The following day, on the third anniversary of the instauration of the Republican regime, she attended a play at Teatro Nacional de São Carlos, but was not offered a seat in the presidential tribune. In November of that same year, she attended the "garden party" thrown by Manuel de Arriaga to the Brazilian sailors visiting Lisbon on occasion of the 23rd anniversary of the Brazilian Republic.

After Manuel de Arriaga left the Presidency in 1915, Lucrécia was supportive of the Portuguese Women's Crusade, in 1916. She died on 15 October 1927, in Parede.

Honorary titles
New title	First Lady of Portugal; 1911–1915	Succeeded by Elzira Dantas Machado
