= List of universities in Bolivia =

This is a list of universities in Bolivia.

== Public and CEUB approved universities ==
- Escuela Militar de Ingeniería (La Paz)
- Universidad Andina Simón Bolívar (Sucre)
- Universidad Autónoma Gabriel René Moreno (Santa Cruz)
- Universidad Autónoma Juan Misael Saracho (Tarija)
- Universidad Autónoma Tomás Frías (Potosí)
- Universidad Católica Boliviana (Cochabamba)
- Universidad Católica Boliviana (La Paz)
- Universidad Católica Boliviana (Santa Cruz)
- Universidad Católica Boliviana (Tarija)
- Universidad Mayor de San Andres (La Paz)
- Universidad Mayor de San Simón (Cochabamba)
- Universidad Técnica de Oruro (Oruro)
- Universidad Mayor Real y Pontificia San Francisco Xavier (Sucre)

== Private universities ==
- Bolivian Private University (La Paz and Cochabamba)
- Nur University (Bolivia)
- TECH Technological University
- Universidad Adventista de Bolivia (Cochabamba)
- Universidad de Aquino Bolivia
- Universidad Loyola
- Universidad Nuestra Señora de La Paz
- Universidad Privada de Santa Cruz de la Sierra (Santa Cruz de la Sierra)

== See also ==
- List of colleges and universities
- List of colleges and universities by country
