= María del Valle =

María del Valle may refer to:

- María Álvarez del Valle (1928–2021), Spanish radio journalist
- María Eugenia del Valle (1928–1994), Chilean-Bolivian historian, researcher, and university professor
- María Remedios del Valle (c. 1768–1847), a pardo soldier who participated in the Argentine War of Independence
