= Marcelo Ostria Trigo =

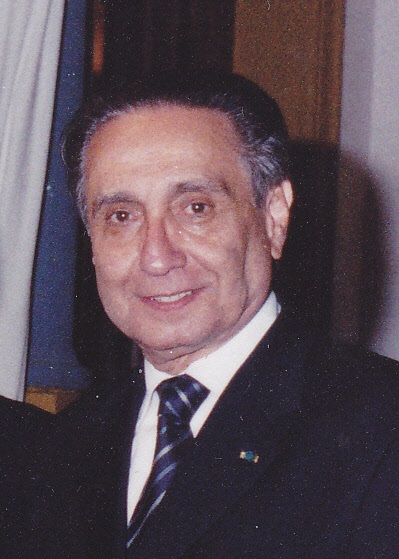

Foreign Affairs Minister of Bolivia ad interim
- In office 1975–1975

Ambassador – Permanent Representative of Bolivia to the Organization of American States (OAS)
- In office 1999–2002

Ambassador of Bolivia to Israel
- In office 1989–1993

Ambassador of Bolivia to Venezuela
- In office 1978–1978

Ambassador of Bolivia to Uruguay
- In office 1976–1977

Personal details
- Born: February 23, 1935 Tarija, Bolivia
- Died: August 30, 2021 (aged 86) Santa Cruz de la Sierra, Bolivia
- Occupation: Diplomat, author, columnist, university professor

Marcelo Ostria Trigo (February 23, 1935 – August 30, 2021) was a Bolivian attorney, government official, diplomat, university professor, columnist and author.

== Early life and education ==
Marcelo Ostria Trigo was born in Tarija, Bolivia, as the fourth child of a Bolivian pediatrician, Eduardo Ostria Gutiérrez (1898–1961) and of Matilde Trigo Pizarro (1902–1997). He studied law at the Universidad Autónoma Juan Misael Saracho and graduated as an attorney in 1960.

== Diplomacy ==
=== Domestic Service ===
He entered Bolivia's Foreign Service in 1966. Among his many positions, his most noteworthy domestic appointments included: Economic Adviser to the Ministry of Foreign Affairs (1969), Under Secretary of the Ministry of Foreign Affairs (1974–1976), Minister of Foreign Affairs ad interim (1975), Under-Secretary-General of the Ministry of Foreign Affairs (1978), Adviser-General to the Ministry of Foreign Affairs (1993) and Foreign Policy Adviser to the President of Bolivia (2005).

=== Under Secretary of the Ministry of Foreign Affairs ===
During his appointment as Under Secretary of the Ministry of Foreign Affairs, he participated as part of the Bolivian Delegation in the Bolivia-Chile presidential meeting of Charaña in 1975. He played a key role in the meeting of Charaña, which led to a historic agreement between Bolivia and Chile that reestablished diplomatic relations between both countries that had been suspended since 1962, and resulted in the agreed upon design of a proposal to restore sovereign sea access to landlocked Bolivia.

=== International Service ===
His international appointments began as Bolivia's Charge D'affaires in Hungary (1971–1973). He was later appointed as Ambassador of Bolivia to Uruguay (1976–1977), Venezuela (1978), and Israel (1990–1993). He was also appointed as Bolivia's Permanent Representative to the Organization of American States (OAS) (1999–2002).

==== Permanent Representative to the OAS ====
During his ambassadorship as Bolivia's Permanent Representative to the OAS, he held the positions of Chair of the Permanent Council (2000) and Chair of the Committee of Hemispheric Security of the Permanent Council (2000–2001) in which he led meetings discussing proposals to new security approaches for the Western Hemisphere.

== Presidency of the Republic of Bolivia ==
He served as the Secretary-General of Bolivia (1997–1999) of the Presidency of the Republic of Bolivia under former Bolivian President Hugo Banzer Suarez. He also served as the Foreign Policy Adviser (2005) to former ad interim President of Bolivia, Eduardo Rodríguez Veltzé.

== University Professor ==
He has taught courses in International Public Law, Critical History of Bolivia and Integration Law at the Universidad Privada Boliviana in La Paz, Bolivia. He has also taught Business Law courses at the Universidad Privada del Valle (Univalle) and at the Universidad Nuestra Señora de La Paz in La Paz. At the Universidad de Aquino (Udabol) in La Paz, he taught Introduction to Law and he also taught International Relations at the Bolivian Air Force Academy.

== Columnist ==
He is an active columnist for the newspapers El Deber of Santa Cruz (Bolivia), El País of Tarija, Bolivia, and La Patria of Oruro, Bolivia. He is also an active columnist for online newspapers and political magazines, such as y de Informe Uruguay of Uruguay, La Historia Paralela of Argentina and América Economía of Chile.

== Author ==
He has published the books "Las negociaciones con Chile de 1975" (Editorial Atenea, 1986) and "Temas de la mediterraneidad" (Editorial Fundemos, 2004). These books cover themes associated with diplomatic negotiations between Bolivia and Chile regarding territorial and sea access disputes after Chile gained a significant amount of land from Peru and Bolivia during the War of the Pacific (1879–1883), making Bolivia a landlocked country.

He is also a writer and poet and has authored a poetry book called "Baladas mínimas" (Editorial El País, 2010).

== Honours and awards ==
He has been honored with the Grand Cross of the Order of the Condor of the Andes, the highest state award for exceptional merit, either civil or military, shown by Bolivians or foreign nationals. He has also received comparable state honours from Argentina as a recipient of the Grand Cross of the Order of May and from Brazil as a recipient of the Commander Order of the Southern Cross and the Grand Cross of the Order Barão of Rio Branco.

In 1997, he was appointed as an honorary member Judge of the Permanent Court of Arbitration at the International Court of Justice.

== Death ==
Trigo died in Santa Cruz de la Sierra, on August 30, 2021, at the age of 86.
