= Order of the Condor of the Andes =

Highest state decoration of Bolivia

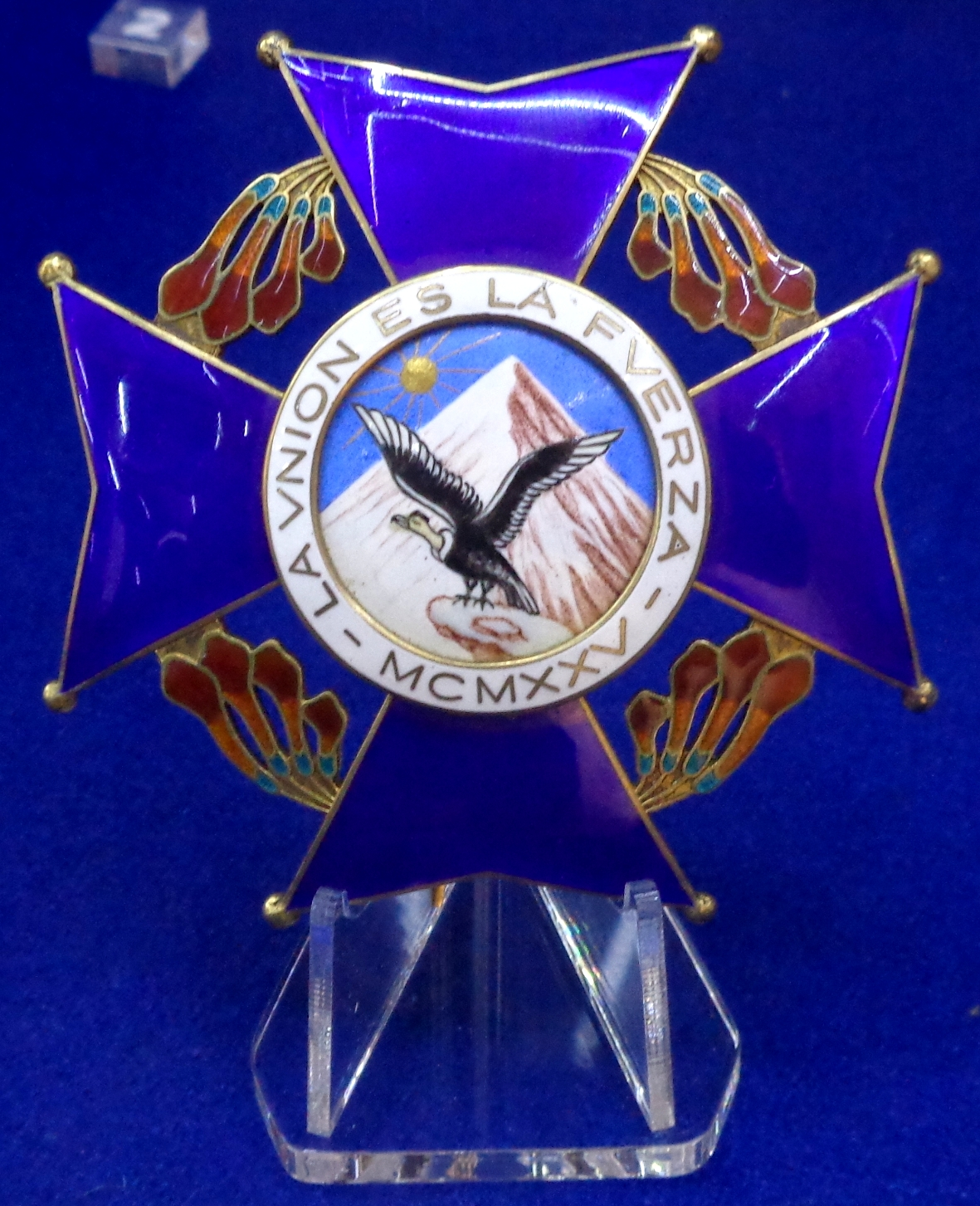
- Grand Cross of the Order of the Condor
- Type: Order of merit with six regular classes
- Established: 12 April 1925
- Country: Plurinational State of Bolivia
- Eligibility: Civilian and military personnel

The Order of the Condor of the Andes (Spanish: Orden del Cóndor de los Andes; OCA) is the highest state decoration of the Plurinational State of Bolivia. The award is bestowed by decision of the president of Bolivia for exceptional merit shown by Bolivian or foreign nationals, and can be conferred to both civilian and military personnel. It was established on 12 April 1925.

Ribbon bars
Grand Collar	Grand Cross	Grand Officer	Commander	Officer	Knight

== Recipients ==
Recipients of the Order include:

- (Germany) Konrad Adenauer, German chancellor.
- Xavier Albó Corrons, Jesuit priest, expert in the indigenous peoples of Bolivia.
- (Bolivia) Hernán Terrazas Céspedes, Bolivian general and Mayor of Cochabamba.
- (Socialist Federal Republic of Yugoslavia) Josip Broz Tito, Yugoslavian politician.
- Carlos Calvo Calvimontes, Foreign Secretary of Bolivia.
- Pedro Castillo, President of Peru.
- (Bolivia) Adolfo Costa du Rels, Bolivian author and diplomat.
- (United States) Wendell C. Bennett, American archaeologist.
- (United States) Jimmy Doolittle, USAF General, Doolittle Raid Leader.
- (United Kingdom) Prince Edward, Duke of Windsor.
- (Vatican City) Pope Francis
- (Mexico) Ernesto Galarza, Mexican-American activist.
- (United States) Clark Hewitt Galloway
- (France) Charles de Gaulle, French president.
- (Bolivia) Javier del Granado, Bolivian poet.
- Ram Nath Kovind, President of India.
- (Bolivia) Carlos Lampe, Bolivian football player.
- (Russia) Ileana Leonidoff, Russian dancer and choreographer, who founded the Ballet Oficial de Bolivia.
- (Bolivia) Marcelo Ostria Trigo, Bolivian author and diplomat.
- Eva Perón, first-lady of Argentina.
- (United Kingdom) Prince Philip, Duke of Edinburgh
- (Socialist Federal Republic of Yugoslavia) Koča Popović, Yugoslav politician and general.
- (Spain) Pedro Sánchez, Spanish prime minister.
- Haile Selassie I, Emperor of Ethiopia.
- (Paraguay) Alfredo Stroessner, Former Paraguayan dictator.
- (Japan) Sunao Sonoda, Japanese foreign minister.
- (Indonesia) Sukarno, Indonesian leader.
- Johannes Leimena, Deputy Prime Minister of Indonesia.
- (United States) Merle Tuve, American scientist.
- (Chile) María Eugenia del Valle, Chilean-Bolivian academic.
- (Iran) Mohammad Javad Zarif, Iranian diplomat and Minister of Foreign Affairs.

In 2002, the Order was awarded to the Pan American Health Organization.

== See also ==
Orders, decorations, and medals of Bolivia
