= Portuguese Women's Crusade =

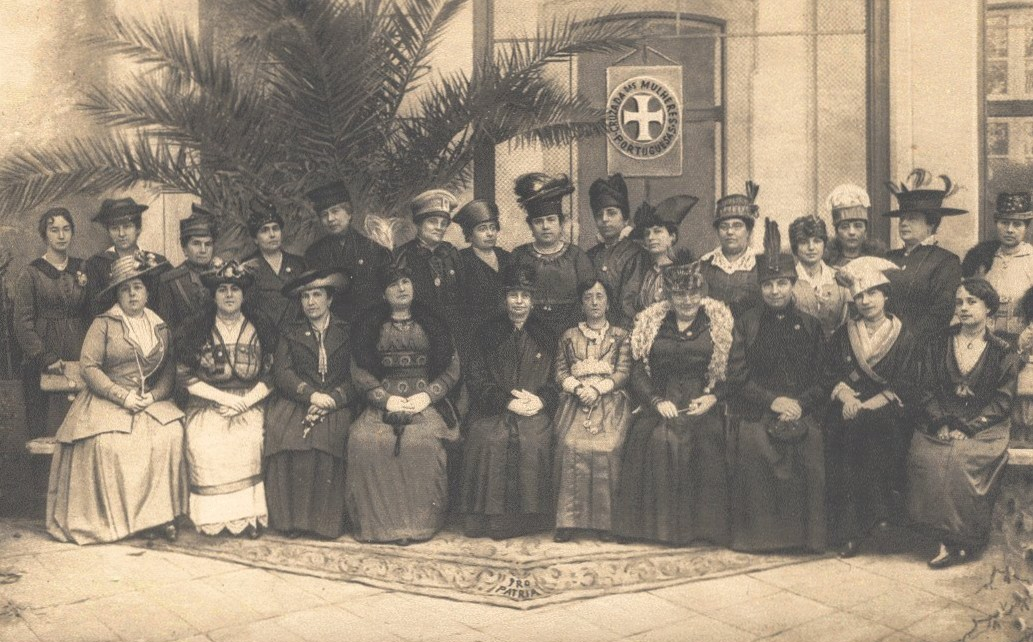
Group photograph of members of the Portuguese Women's Crusade

The Portuguese Women's Crusade GCTE (Portuguese: Cruzada das Mulheres Portuguesas [kɾuˈzaðɐ ðɐʒ muˈʎɛɾɨʃ puɾtuˈɣezɐʃ]) was a Portuguese feminist beneficence movement, founded in 1916 by a group of women led by First Lady Elzira Dantas Machado (an important advocate for women's activism, a founder of the Republican League of Portuguese Women and president of the Association of Feminist Propaganda), aiming to provide moral and material assistance to those in need in the context of the First World War and the enforcement of conscription. It disbanded in 1938. A staple of the so-called first-wave feminism in Portugal, it has been studied as a key feature of the history of feminism in the context of the Portuguese First Republic.

The Portuguese Women's Crusade was not meant to be perceived as a political organisation, rather, it called itself a "patriotic and humanitarian institution" in its statutes, and brought together women of different political and cultural backgrounds. Along the Women's Crusade several founding members were the wives and daughters of several important politicians and military officers, namely Alzira Costa (wife of the Democratic Party leader Afonso Costa), Ester Norton de Matos (wife of the War Minister José Norton de Matos), and Amélia Leote do Rego (wife of Jaime Daniel Leote do Rego, the commander of the Naval Division), as well as important feminists, such as Ana de Castro Osório. Also a member was Portugal's first female lawyer, Regina Quintanilha. Activities conducted included the training of new nurses who were not Catholic nuns. This was led by Sofia Quintino.

On 12 June 1919, President Canto e Castro made the Portuguese Women's Crusade a Grand Cross of the Order of the Tower and of the Sword, of Valour, Loyalty and Merit, and founder Elzira Dantas Machado a Grand Cross of the Order of Christ.
