= Orders, decorations, and medals of Bolivia =

The orders, decorations, and medals of Bolivia are awards made by the Bolivian government to reward societal, governmental, and military merit.

| Ribbon Bar | Name (English) | Name (Spanish) | Date of establishment |
Decoration worn only by the sitting President of Bolivia
| | President's Medal | Medalla Presidencial de Bolivia | 1825 |
Other Orders, Decorations, and Medals
| | National Order of the Condor of the Andes - Grand Collar | Orden Nacional del Cóndor de los Andes – Gran Collar | 1925/1966* |
| | National Order of the Condor of the Andes - Grand Cross | Orden Nacional del Cóndor de los Andes – Gran Cruz | 1925 |
| | National Order of the Condor of the Andes - Grand Officer | Orden Nacional del Cóndor de los Andes – Gran Oficial | 1925 |
| | National Order of the Condor of the Andes - Commander | Orden Nacional del Cóndor de los Andes – Comendador | 1925 |
| | National Order of the Condor of the Andes - Officer | Orden Nacional del Cóndor de los Andes – Oficial | 1925 |
| | National Order of the Condor of the Andes - Knight | Orden Nacional del Cóndor de los Andes – Caballero | 1925 |
| | Civil Merit Order of the Liberator Simón Bolivar – Grand Cross. | Orden al Mérito Civil del Libertador Simón Bolivar – Gran Cruz | 1986 |
| | Civil Merit Order of the Liberator Simón Bolivar – Commander | Orden al Mérito Civil del Libertador Simón Bolivar – Comendador | 1986 |
| | Civil Merit Order of the Liberator Simón Bolivar – Officer | Orden al Mérito Civil del Libertador Simón Bolivar – Oficial | 1986 |
| | Legion of Honour "Marshal Andrés de Santa Cruz y Calahumana” – Grand Cross. | Legión de Honor “Mariscal Andrés Santa Cruz y Calahumana” – Gran Cruz | 2004 |
| | Legion of Honour of "Marshal Andrés de Santa Cruz y Calahumana” – Grand Officer | Legión de Honor “Mariscal Andrés Santa Cruz y Calahumana” – Gran Oficial | 2004 |
| | Legion of Honour of "Marshal Andrés de Santa Cruz y Calahumana” – Commander | Legión de Honor “Mariscal Andrés Santa Cruz y Calahumana” – Comendador | 2004 |
| | Legion of Honour of "Marshal Andrés de Santa Cruz y Calahumana” – Officer | Legión de Honor “Mariscal Andrés Santa Cruz y Calahumana” – Oficial | 2004 |
| | Legion of Honour of "Marshal Andrés de Santa Cruz y Calahumana” – Knight | Legión de Honor “Mariscal Andrés Santa Cruz y Calahumana” – Caballero | 2004 |
| | Order of Military Merit. | Orden al “Mérito Militar” | 1927 |
| ribbon unknown | Order of Teaching Merit. | Orden del Mérito del Maestro | 1937 |
| | Grand Bolivian Order of Education – Grand Cross. | Gran Orden Boliviana de la Educación – Gran Cruz | 1951 |
| | Grand Bolivian Order of Education – Grand Officer | Gran Orden Boliviana de la Educación – Gran Oficial | 1951 |
| | Grand Bolivian Order of Education – Commander | Gran Orden Boliviana de la Educación – Comendador | 1951 |
| | Grand Bolivian Order of Education – Officer | Gran Orden Boliviana de la Educación – Oficial | 1951 |
| | Grand Bolivian Order of Education – Knight | Gran Orden Boliviana de la Educación – Caballero | 1951 |
| | Order of Naval Merit. | Orden al Mérito Naval | 1965 |
| | Order of Aeronautic Merit. | Orden al Mérito Aeronáutico | 1965 |
| | Order of Public Health. | Orden de la Salud Pública | 1965 |
| no ribbon | Order of Labour. | Orden del Trabajo | 1970 |
| ribbon unknown | Bolivian Order of Commercial Merit. | Orden Boliviana al Mérito Comercial | 1993 |
| ribbon unknown | Order of Merit of "Father Luis Espinal Camps”. | Orden al Mérito “Padre Luis Espinal Camps” | 2015 |
| ribbon unknown | Order of the Bolivian National Police. | Orden de la Policía Nacional de Bolivia | 1961 |
| ribbon unknown | Distinguished Service Cross of the Police. | La Cruz de Servicios Distinguidos | 1961 |
| ribbon unknown | Congressional Medal for the Police. | La Medalla del Congreso | 1961 |
| ribbon unknown | Medal Of Merit. | Medalla al Mérito | 1968 |
| ribbon unknown | Medal of Tourism Progress. | Medalla al Progreso por el Turismo | 1968 |
| | Medal of Sport Merit. | Medalla al Mérito Deportivo | 1968 |
| | Bronze Cross of the Chaco War. | Condecoracion "Cruz de Bronce" (por la Guerra del Chaco 1932–1935) | 1956 |
| ribbon unknown | Decoration of the "Grand Cross of Boquerón". | Condecoración de la “Gran Cruz de Boquerón” | 1964 |
| | Decoration of Military Merit "Hero of Liberation General of Division José Miguel Lanza”. | Condecoracion al Mérito Militar “Prócer de la Libertad General de División José Miguel Lanza” | 1965 |
| ribbon unknown | Decoration of the President of the Republic. | Condecoración “Presidente de la República” | 1968 |
| | Decoration of the "Golden Banner" of the Bolivian National Senate | Condecoración "Bandera de oro" del Senado Nacional de Bolivia | 2002 |
| ribbon unknown | Decoration "Hero or Heroine of the Defence of Natural Resources". | Condecoración “Heroína o Héroe de la Defensa de los Recursos Naturales” | 2016 |
| ribbon unknown | Decoration of Ernesto Guevara de la Serna "El Che”. | Condecoración Ernesto Guevara de la Serna “El Che” | 2017 |
Decorations from before WWII
| | Bolivian Legion Honour. | Legión de Honor Boliviana” | 1835 |
| ribbon unknown | Cross of Columbus | Cruz de Colón | 1892 |
| ribbon unknown | Military Merit Cross | Cruz “Al Mérito Militar” | 1932 |
| ribbon unknown | Military Merit Medal | Medalla “Al Mérito Militar” | 1932 |
| ribbon unknown | Badge for the war-wounded | Placa para Heridos en Acciones de Guerra | 1932 |
| ribbon unknown | Medal for the Chaco War | Medalla de Guerra en la Campaña del Chaco | 1935 |
| ribbon unknown | Medal for the victors of the campaigns of the Peru-Bolivian Confederation. | Medalla a los Vencedores en las Campañas de la Confederación Peruano-Boliviana | 1836–1839 |
| ribbon unknown | Medal for the victors of the Battle of Ingavi | Medalla a los Vencedores de Ingavi | 1841 |
| ribbon unknown | Medal Campaign of the Pacific | Medalla de la Campaña del Pacifico | 1884 |
| ribbon unknown | Medal of the Acre Campaign | Medalla de la Campaña del Acre | 1900 |

== Bibliography ==
Legal Acts (by date of decree)

- Decreto Lejislativo de 12 de Octubre 1892. Cruz de Colón
- Decreto Supremo de 18 de Abril de 1925. Créase la Condecoración nacional de la «Orden del Cóndor de los Andes»
- Ley de 5 de febrero de 1927. Créase la Orden que se denominará "Al Mérito Militar"
- Decreto Supremo de 16 de Noviembre de 1932. Condecoración al Mérito Militar
- Decreto Supremo del 17 de Septiembre de 1937. Institúyese la condecoración nacional de la "Orden del Mérito del Maestro"
- Decreto Ley N° 2783, 9 de octubre de 1951. Se instituye la Condecoración Nacional de la “Gran Orden Boliviana de la Educación”
- Decreto Supremo N° 3922, de 30 de Diciembre de 1954. Créase el Grado de "Gran Collar de la Orden Nacional del Cóndor de los Andes"
- Ley de 21 de diciembre de 1956. Declárase "Beneméritos de la Patria" a todos los ciudadanos bolivianos que, habiendo concurrido a la Campaña del Chaco (distinción "Cruz de Bronce")
- Ley Orgánica de la Policía, 18 de diciembre de 1961. Título X: De las Condecoraciones
- Decreto Supremo N° 6129, 08 de Junio de 1962. Las condecoraciones de la "Orden de la Policía Boliviana"
- Ley Orgánica de las Fuerzas Armadas, 20 de diciembre de 1963. Sección: Condecoraciones y Recompensas
- Ley N° 293, 11 de enero de 1964. Créase la Confederación de la “Gran Cruz de Boquerón”
- Decreto Ley 7403 de 26 de noviembre de 1965. Crea Condecoración Nacional de la Orden de la Salud Pública
- Decreto Ley N° 7698, de 15 de Julio de 1966. Complementa el Reglamento de la Orden Nacional Boliviana del Cóndor de los Andes
- Decreto Supremo N° 8411, 11 de julio de 1968. El Ministerio de Cultura, Información y Turismo, queda facultado para otorgar los siguientes premios nacionales (medallas)
- Decreto Supremo N° 7879, 4 de diciembre de 1968. Créase la Condecoración “Presidente de la República”
- Decreto Supremo N° 23466, 6 de abril de 1993. Créase la Condecoración de la Orden Boliviana al Mérito Comercial
- Ley N° 1762, 5 de marzo de 1997. La Condecoración Nacional de la Orden del Cóndor de los Andes, creada por Decreto Supremo del 18 de abril de 1925
- Decreto Supremo Nº 26676, 2 de julio de 2002. La medalla del Libertador Simón Bolívar será utilizada únicamente en el aniversario de la Independencia y transmisión de mando presidencial
- Decreto Supremo N° 27423, 26 de marzo de 2004. Se aprueba el Reglamento de la Legión de Honor "Mariscal Andrés Santa Cruz y Calahumana"
- Ley N° 714, 1 de julio de 2015. Se instituye la Condecoración de la Orden al Mérito “Padre Luis Espinal Camps”
- Decreto Supremo N° 2918, 27 de septiembre de 2016. Se crea la condecoración denominada “Heroína o Héroe de la Defensa de los Recursos Naturales”
- Ley N° 980, 5 de octubre de 2017. Se instituye la Condecoración Ernesto Guevara de la Serna “El Che”

Publications

- Ricardo Iván Álvarez Carrasco: Medallas, Premios y condecoraciones antes, durante y después de la Confederación Perú Boliviana. Prosecretario de la Academia Panamericana de Historia de la Medicina. „OMNI” N°15 – 12/2021, s. 278–299
- Reglamento de Condecoraciones y Distinciones Polica Boliviana. La Paz: 2010 (Spanish)
- Wiesław Bończa-Tomaszewski: Kodeks orderowy. Warszawa-Kraków: 1939, s. 300-301 (Polish)

Web Links

- Ilja Repetski: Orders and medals of Bolivia. wawards.org
- Antonio Prieto Barrio: Colección de Cintas (1) + (2). www.coleccionesmilitares.com (Spanish)
- Megan C. Robertson: Orders, Decorations and Medals of Bolivia: Text List. www.medals.org.uk
- Yuri Yashnev: За заслуги... Америка/America: Боливия/Bolivia. awards.netdialogue.com
