= Regina Quintanilha =

First female lawyer in Portugal

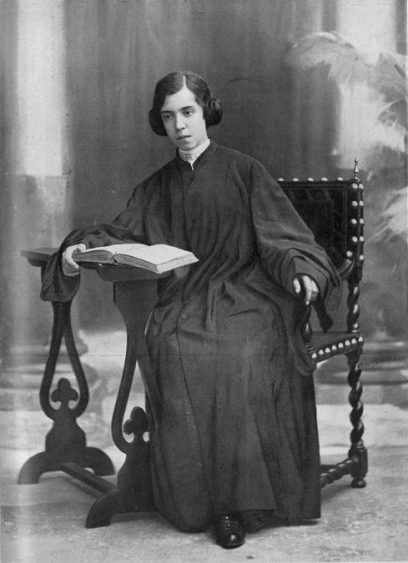
Regina Quintanilha

Regina Quintanilha (1893-1967) was the first Portuguese woman to obtain a law degree at the University of Coimbra. Despite the law prohibiting women to practise law, on 14 November 1913 she received authorization from the President of the Supreme Court of Justice to do so and became the first female lawyer in Portugal.

== Early life ==
Regina da Glória Pinto de Magalhães Quintanilha de Sousa e Vasconcelos was born on 9 May 1893 in Bragança. Coming from a wealthy family, Quintanilha received a privileged education. Her mother, Josefa Quintanilha, was a writer and poet, who attached considerable value to study. After school in Bragança and completing high school in Porto, Quintanilha joined the Faculty of Law of the University of Coimbra, in 1910. At this time in Portugal it was extremely rare for a woman to go to university and she was the first woman to study Law in Portugal. The University of Coimbra was generally regarded as the best university in Portugal at that time, attracting students with the best high school marks. Among Quintanilha's fellow students was António de Oliveira Salazar, future head of state as leader of Portugal's Estado Novo dictatorship.

== Career ==
In 1913 Quintanilha was granted authorization to practice Law, five years before a Decree was issued permitting women to do this. In the same year she made her debut in court in the Portuguese capital of Lisbon as the country's first female lawyer. This was favourably covered by several newspapers, such as Diário de Notícias, O Século and República. She also worked as a public notary and as a conservator (record keeper) of the Portuguese Land Registry. She was also the first woman to have these responsibilities. In 1917, she served as president of the General Assembly of the feminist-inspired Portuguese Women's Crusade, an organization set up to provide support to conscripts during World War I.

Quintanilha married Vicente de Vasconcelos, a judge, and they had two sons. She later moved to Brazil, where she collaborated in the reform of Brazilian law. She established an office in Rio de Janeiro and, later, one in New York. On her return to Portugal she worked as a lawyer for several French companies. Quintanilha died in Lisbon, on the 25 March 1967.
