= Order of Bernardo O'Higgins =

Chilean civilian award for non-citizens

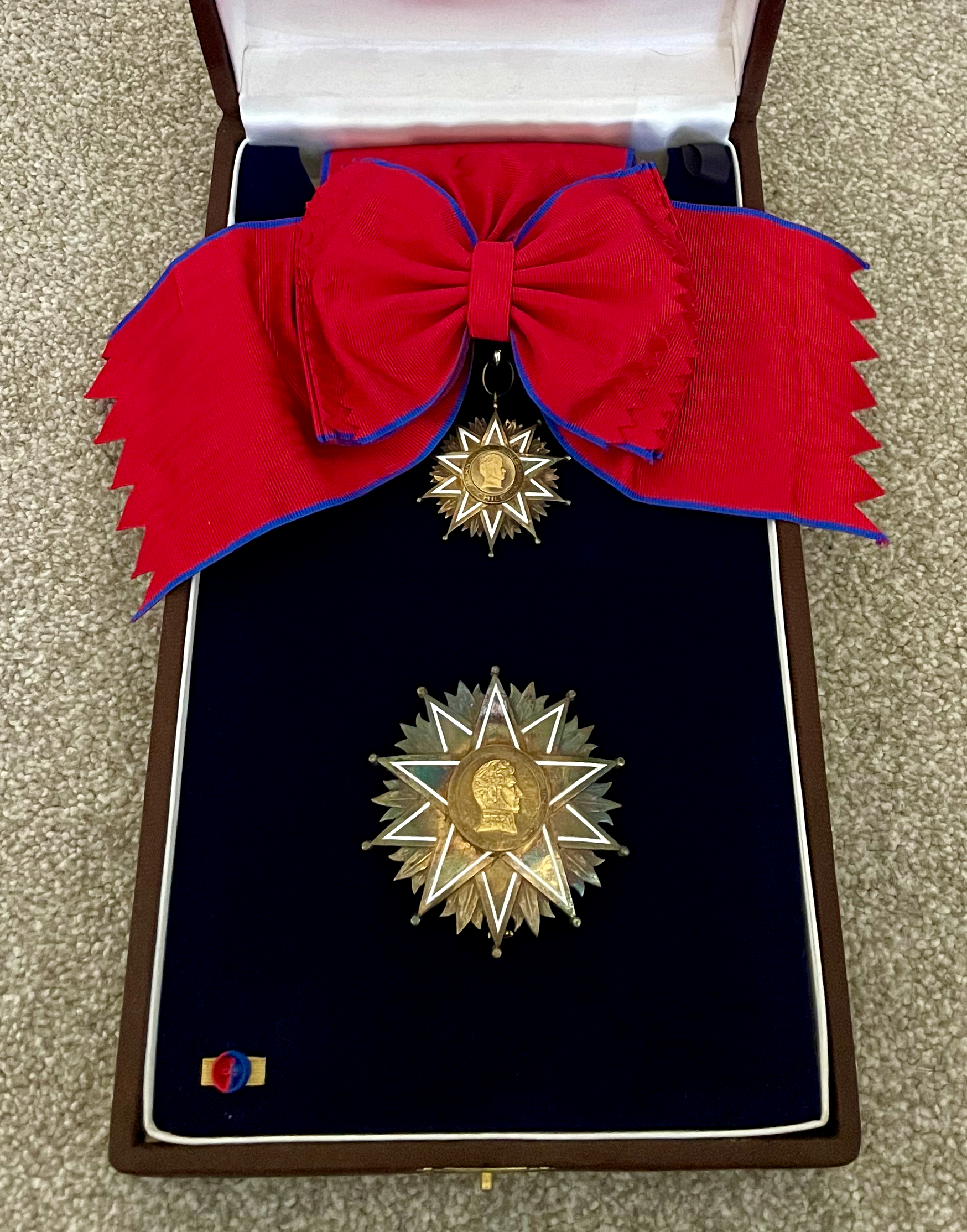
- Grand Cross set

Awarded by the President of Chile
- Type: Civil order
- Established: 28 April 1956
- Country: Chile
- Eligibility: Foreign citizens
- Awarded for: Achievements in the field of arts, sciences, education, industry, trade, humanitarian and social cooperation

Precedence
- Next (higher): Order of Merit
- Next (lower): Gabriela Mistral Order of Educational and Cultural Merit

The Order of Bernardo O'Higgins (Spanish: Orden de Bernardo O'Higgins) is an award issued by Chile. It is the highest civilian honor awarded to non-Chilean citizens. This award was established in 1965 and named after one of the founders of the Chilean state, the independentist general Bernardo O'Higgins, who was a leader of the struggle from 1810 to 1826 for independence of Spanish colonies which became Chile and Peru.

== Grades ==
The order is made up of the following grades:

- Knight
- Officer
- Commander
- Grand Officer
- Grand Cross
- Collar

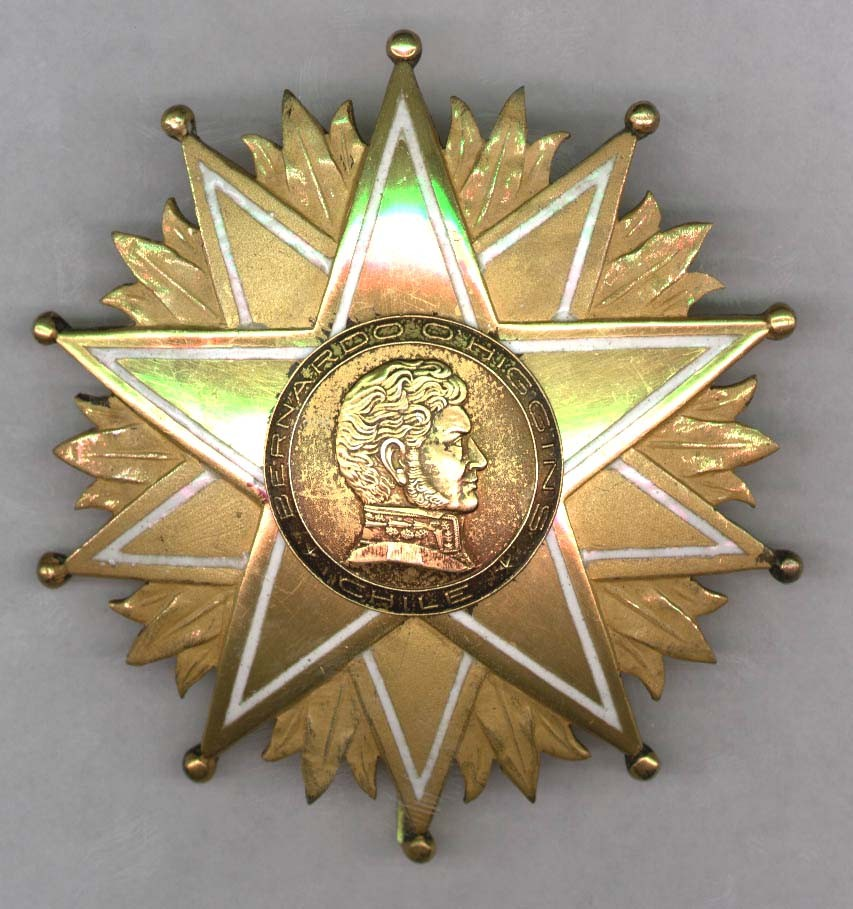
Grand Cross Star

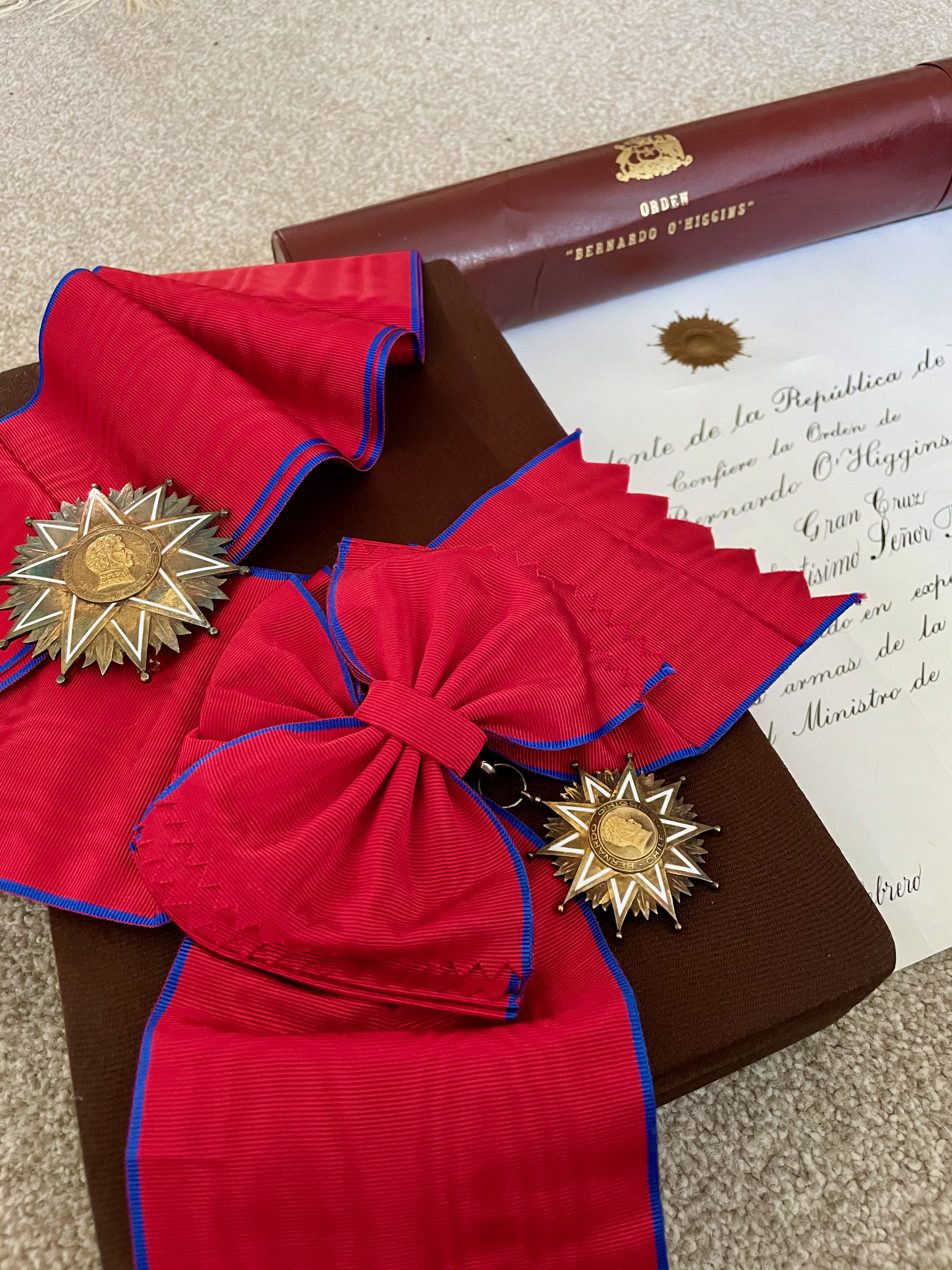
Order of Bernardo O'Higgins – Grand Cross with bestowal document

Knight	Officer	Commander	Grand Officer	Grand Cross	Collar

== Recipients ==
- Emilio Álvarez Montalván
- Margot Benacerraf
- Rafael Bielsa
- Maria Cavaco Silva
- Artur Chilingarov
- Jack Dutton
- Carlos Escudé
- Bob Fulton, John Keenan and Robert Somerville
- Rev. Charles Roy Harper Jr. (2010)
- Clark Hewett Galloway
- Stanisław Gebhardt
- Thomas Kerstiens
- Antonio López-Istúriz White
- Mike Medavoy
- Adam Michnik
- Alois Mock
- Robert Keating O'Neill
- Óscar Osorio
- Park Young-ju
- Ada Rogato
- Dorothy Olive Royce, (1951), for medical missionary service in Cholchol.
- William Rudolph
- Mercedes Sosa
- Héctor Valdez Albizu
- Stuart Van Dyke
- Oscar Von Kohorn
- Maxime Verhagen
- Max Westenhöfer

=== Grand Crosses ===
- Jan Peter Balkenende
- Xavier Barcons (2020)
- Maria Cavaco Silva
- Prince Daniel, Duke of Västergötland
- Piet de Jong
- Ridzwan Dzafir (1996)
- Tim Fischer
- Stephen Kim Sou-hwan (2002)
- Roberto Kozak (1992)
- Mohammed VI of Morocco
- Jan Pronk
- Christopher Reeve
- Queen Silvia of Sweden
- Tunku Abdullah (1995)
- Tunku Naquiyuddin
- Simon Wiesenthal

== See also ==
- Orders, decorations, and medals of Chile

== Sources ==
- Robert Werlich: Orders and Decorations of all Nations – Ancient and Modern – Civil and Military. Washington 1990.
