= Clark Hewett Galloway =

Colonel Clark Hewett Galloway

Colonel Clark Hewett Galloway (September 23, 1898 – January 1, 1961) was an American newspaper and magazine editor, Latin American affairs expert and colonel in the United States Army.

== Journalism career ==
Galloway worked on newspapers in Fort Morgan and Fort Collins, Colorado, Chicago, Illinois, Omaha, Nebraska, and Cedar Rapids and Council Bluffs, Iowa. In Council Bluffs, Galloway was the managing editor of the Council Bluffs Nonpareil. He joined the staff of the Washington bureau of the Associated Press in July 1938, and remained there until March 1941, when he was ordered to active military duty. Upon leaving active military service in November 1945, he joined the U.S. News Publishing Corp., where he served as editor of Latin American and Canadian news; first for United States News, then for World Report, and finally, for the combined magazine, U.S. News & World Report. During his career, Galloway interviewed and wrote about some of the most influential figures in Latin America, including Fidel Castro and Juan Peron.

He was a member of the National Press Club, the Overseas Writers Association, the Explorers Club of New York, Phi Beta Kappa, and Sigma Delta Chi.

== Military ==
Galloway was commissioned second lieutenant in World War I at the age of 19, and was active in the Organized Reserve Corps between World Wars. He was ordered to active duty as a member of the War Department General Staff in March 1941, where he served until November 1945. From 1943 to 1945, Galloway held the grade of colonel while serving in the Army Intelligence Corps.

=== Decorations and awards ===
- Legion of Merit, U.S. Army
- Military Order of Ayacucho, Peru
- National Order of the Condor of the Andes, Bolivia
- National Order of Merit (Chile), Order of Bernardo O'Higgins
