= Dorothy Olive Royce =

English Christian missionary (1898–1974)

Dorothy Olive Royce (25 January 1898 – 26 May 1974) was a British Christian medical missionary nurse and author who worked in Chile with the South American Missionary Society (SAMS) under the Araucanian Mission. She worked primarily among the Mapuche (Araucanian) people in Cholchol. She founded and managed the hospital in Cholchol, later renamed the Dorothy Royce Hospital. Royce was awarded one of Chile’s highest civilian honours for her service.

== Early life and family ==
Royce was born on 25 January 1989 in Ely, Cambridgeshire, England. She was the daughter of George William Royce (1871–1952), an assistant butcher, and Mary Ellen Royce (1873–1961). She had five siblings, including a sister who also worked as a medical missionary nurse in South America. In 1949, Royce's sister Yolande adopted a daughter, Priscilla Pettit, at one month of age. When Yolande died in 1957, Royce raised Priscilla.

== Education ==
Royce trained as a nurse at the Mildmay Mission Hospital in London from 1920 to 1923. She received her nursing registration on 24 April 1925.

== Career ==
Medical missionary work in Cholchol, Chile, began in 1895. Royce joined this mission when she arrived in Chile in 1926, serving as a medical missionary under the South American Missionary Society.

In 1933, Royce established a small hospital in Cholchol, initially with two beds. Over time, the facility expanded, eventually caring for approximately 18 patients. Royce managed and operated the hospital until 1955. The hospital was renamed the "Dorothy Royce Hospital" on her retirement and return to England. A song was also composed for her departure, A Dios Miss Royce.

Royce worked closely with the local population, particularly among the Mapuche (also known historically as Araucanian) people of the Cholchol region.

== Recognition and honors ==
On 15 December 1951, Royce was awarded the Order of Merit Bernardo O'Higgins by the Government of Chile for distinguished service to the country over twenty-five years. The ceremony took place in Cholchol and was attended by 1,500 people, including government officials, civic representations, missionaries, patients and members of the local Chilean and Mapuche communities. The decoration was presented by the Government of the Department of Nueva Imperial, Señor Aner Padilla Zapata, in the name of President Gabriel Gonzalez Videla. In the official address, Royce's efficiency, self-sacrifice and lifesaving medical work were highlighted.

== Publications ==
Royce was also an author of books for young readers.

- Flower of Gold (1958)
- Nurse Millaray: a sequel to Flower of Gold (1974) is set in Chile and reflects themes drawn from missionary nursing and cross-cultural service.

== Later life and death ==
After retiring from missionary work, Royce died on 26 May 1974.

In October 1969, with a shortage of missionary volunteers, and the Chilean national health system having built a larger hospital in Nueva Imperial, the Dorothy Royce Hospital closed. The Hospital facility continued as a health center run by Chilean nurses and staff.
