= Maria José Ritta =

First Lady of Portugal

Maria José Ritta GCIH
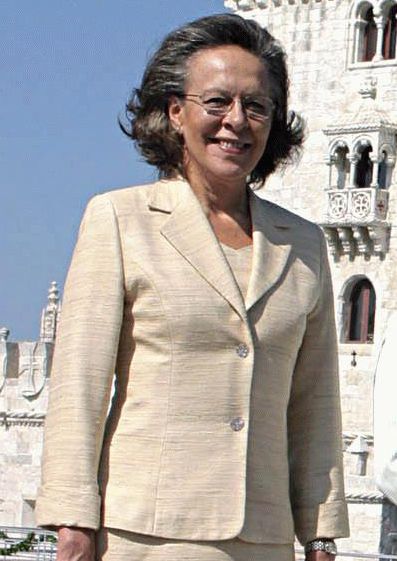
- Maria José Ritta at the Belém Tower in 2003.

First Lady of Portugal
- In office 9 March 1996 – 9 March 2006
- President: Jorge Sampaio
- Preceded by: Maria Barroso
- Succeeded by: Maria Cavaco Silva

Personal details
- Born: Maria José Rodrigues Ritta; 19 December 1941 (age 84) Lisbon, Portugal
- Spouse: Jorge Sampaio (m. 1974)
- Children: 2
- Education: Instituto Superior de Ciências Sociais e Políticas

Maria José Rodrigues Ritta (born 19 December 1941) is a Portuguese former TAP Air Portugal manager. She served as the First Lady of Portugal from 1996 until 2006 as the wife of the 18th President of the Portuguese Republic, Jorge Sampaio.

== Biography ==
Born in Lisbon in 1941, Ritta is the daughter of José António Ritta, a canning industrialist, and his wife, Maria José Rodrigues Xavier. Although she was born in Lisbon, Ritta spent her childhood and teenage years in the parish of Vila Real de Santo António in her parents' native Algarve region of southern Portugal. Ritta completed a secretariat certification at the Instituto Superior de Línguas e Administração and obtained her bachelor's degree in political and social sciences at the Instituto Superior de Ciências Sociais e Políticas (ISCSP), which is part of the University of Lisbon.

She married Jorge Sampaio in April 1974, becoming his second wife. The couple have two children, a daughter, Vera Ritta de Sampaio (born 1975) and a son, André Ritta de Sampaio (born 1980).

=== Career ===
Ritta initially worked as a model and administrative secretary until 1976, when she was hired by TAP Air Portugal, the country's flag carrier. She became the airline's supervisor of public administration in 1969 and was promoted to TAP Air Portugal's commercial division in the late 1970s. Her career at TAP continued for nearly thirty years. She retired from as TAP Air Portugal's general manager for the airline's Portuguese domestic market manager in 1996 upon her husband's election as president.

She then assumed to the role of First Lady of Portugal from 1996 to 2006. Ritta sought to transform the role of first lady into a position that highlights social causes and initiatives. Ritta used her position to advocate for the rights of children, the elderly, disabled, and other socially vulnerable groups in Portuguese society. She chaired the 2001 National Commission for the International Year of Volunteering (Comissão Nacional para o Ano Internacional do Voluntariado), which encoyraged volunteerism.

On 8 March 2017, Ritta and her successor, former First Lady Maria Cavaco Silva were awarded the Order of Prince Henry by Portuguese President Marcelo Rebelo de Sousa in a ceremony at the Belém Tower.

Her husband, former President Jorge Sampaio, died on 10 September 2021.

== Honors ==
=== National ===
- Portugal: Grand Cross of the Order of Prince Henry, 9 March 2017

=== Foreign ===
- Belgium: Grand Cordon of the Order of Leopold, 9 October 2000
- Estonia:
  - First Class of the Order of the Cross of Terra Mariana, 27 June 2003
  - First Class of the Order of the White Star, 29 March 2006
- Finland: Grand Cross of the Order of the White Rose of Finland, 6 February 2003
- Germany: Grand Cross First Class of the Order of Merit of the Federal Republic of Germany, 8 May 2003
- Greece: Grand Cross of the Order of Beneficence, 10 December 1999
- Japan: Grand Cordon (Paulownia) of the Order of the Precious Crown, 30 May 1998
- Lithuania: Grand Cross of the Order of the Lithuanian Grand Duke Gediminas, 27 June 2003
- Luxembourg: Grand Cross of the Order of Adolphe of Nassau, 15 September 2010
- Norway: Grand Cross of the Royal Norwegian Order of Merit, 22 June 2004
- Romania: Grand Cross of the Order of the Star of Romania, 15 March 2000
- Spain:
  - Dame Grand Cross of the Order of Charles III, 11 September 2000
  - Dame Grand Cross of the Order of Isabella the Catholic, 3 March 1998

Honorary titles
Preceded by Maria Barroso	First Lady of Portugal; 1996–2006	Succeeded by Maria Cavaco Silva
