= Xavier Albó =

Bolivian anthropologist (1934–2023)

Xavier Albó Corrons, S.J., (4 November 1934 – 20 January 2023) was a Spanish-Bolivian Jesuit priest, linguist, and anthropologist, with expertise in the indigenous peoples and rural populations of Bolivia.

== Biography ==
Albó was born in La Garriga, in Catalonia, Spain, and joined the Society of Jesus in 1951. In 1952, he moved to Bolivia and later became a naturalized citizen of the country. He was decorated with the Order of the Condor of the Andes, the highest civilian honor of the Bolivian state, on 6 April 2016.

Albó co-founded the Center for Research and Promotion of Farmers (Centro de Investigación y Promoción del Campesinado, CIPCA) in 1971. He served as its first director through 1976.
