= Margarida Maldonado Freitas =

First Lady of Portugal since 2026

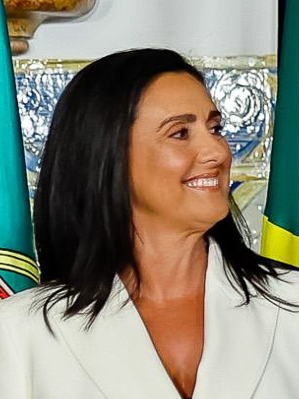
- Maldonado Freitas in 2026

First Lady of Portugal
- Assumed role 9 March 2026
- President: António José Seguro
- Preceded by: Maria Cavaco Silva (2016)

Personal details
- Born: Maria Margarida Nave Nunes Maldonado Freitas; 24 October 1970 (age 55) Caldas da Rainha, Portugal
- Spouse: António José Seguro (m. 2001)
- Children: 2

Margarida Maldonado Freitas (born 24 October 1970) is a Portuguese pharmacist who has been the First Lady of Portugal since 2026, as the wife of President António José Seguro.

== Biography ==
Freitas was born in 1970 in Caldas da Rainha into a deeply politicized family, with her father Custódio Maldonado Freitas having been a Member of the Assembly of the Republic from the Socialist Party.

Freitas met António José Seguro in the night he left the leadership of the Socialist Youth, and they both got married in Óbidos in September 2001. The couple had two children, Maria, born in 2002, and António, born in 2004.

After her husband was elected President in 2026, she defended that there was no official role of First Lady, deciding not to have an office and keeping her job as a pharmacist, only accompanying her husband when it is required.

Honorary titles
Vacant Title last held by Maria Cavaco Silva	First Lady of Portugal; 2026–present	Incumbent
