= Manuela Ramalho Eanes =

First Lady of Portugal

Manuela Ramalho Eanes GCIH GCCa
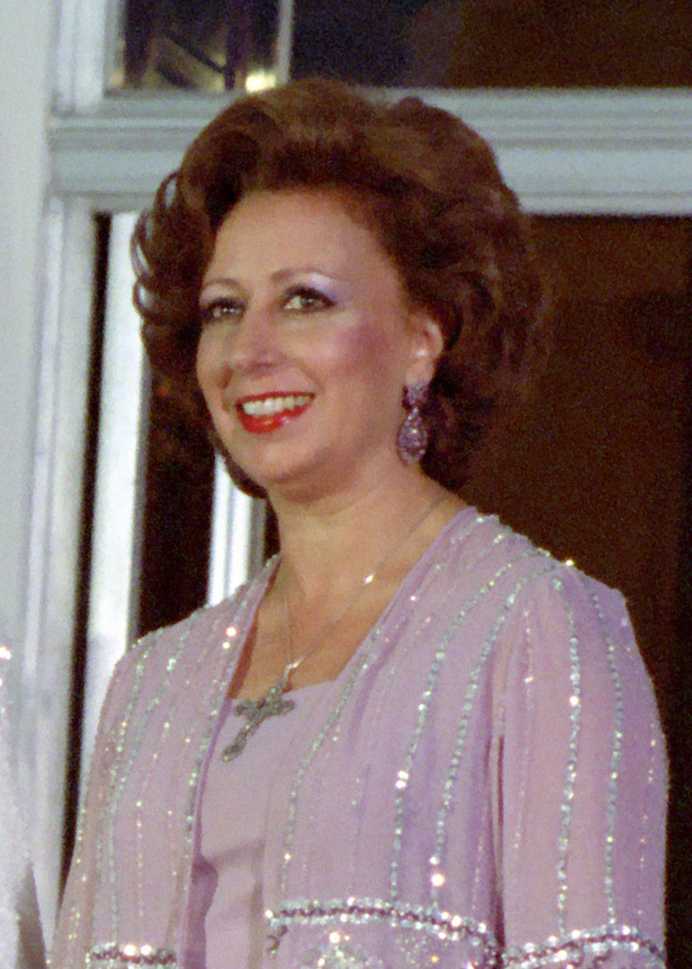
- Ramalho Eanes in 1983

First Lady of Portugal
- In office 14 July 1976 – 9 March 1986
- President: António Ramalho Eanes
- Preceded by: Estela Costa Gomes
- Succeeded by: Maria Barroso

Personal details
- Born: 29 December 1938 (age 87) Almada, Portugal
- Spouse: António Ramalho Eanes
- Children: 2

Maria Manuela Duarte Neto Portugal Ramalho Eanes (born 29 December 1938) was the First Lady of Portugal from 1976 to 1986, as the wife of the President of Portugal, António Ramalho Eanes.

She broke tradition for wives of Portugal's heads of state, by speaking out about taboo issues such as child sexual abuse. In 1983, she founded Instituto de Apoio à Criança (IAC; Institute of Support to the Child). As a law graduate, and at 37 the youngest in her position, she had a different profile to other First Ladies of the country.

In 1977, after the birth of her second son, she declared her position in favour of ending the complete ban on abortion in Portugal. She called abortion "humiliating for the dignity of women" and said that it should only be allowed in medical emergencies.

== Honours ==
=== National ===
- Grand Cross of the Order of Prince Henry (7 March 1997)
- Grand Cross of the Order of Camões (20 November 2023)

=== Foreign ===
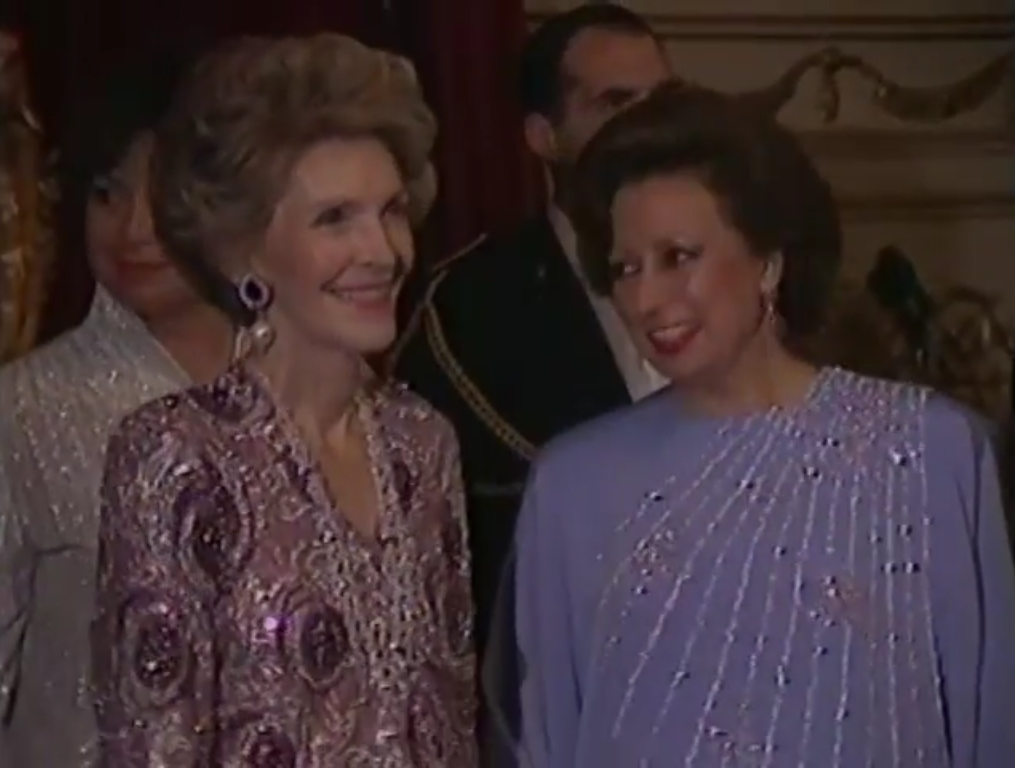
Ramalho Eanes (right) and First Lady of the United States, Nancy Reagan in 1985

- Belgium: Grand Cross of the Order of the Crown (17 June 1982)
- Brazil: Grand Cross of the Order of the Southern Cross (20 January 1982)
- Bulgaria: 1st Class of the Order of the Rose (15 July 1980)
- People's Republic of the Congo: Grand Cross of the Order of Devotion (16 May 1984)
- Egypt: First Class of the Order of the Virtues (23 March 1984)
- Germany: Grand Cross of the Order of Merit of the Federal Republic of Germany (15 July 1980)
- Holy See: Grand Cross of the Pro Ecclesia et Pontifice (15 July 1980)
- Luxembourg: Grand Cross of the Order of Adolphe of Nassau (2 January 1985)
- Spain: Dame Grand Cross of the Order of Isabella the Catholic (15 July 1980)
- Norway: Grand Cross of the Order of St. Olav (13 October 1980)
