= TECH Global University =

Online unaccredited university

- Motto: The world's largest online university
- Type: private
- Established: 2005; 21 years ago
- Founder: Manuel Sánchez-Cascado de Fuentes
- Affiliations: Canary Islands Agency for University Quality and Educational Evaluation (ACCUEE), European Higher Education Area
- Academic staff: 6,000
- Students: 500,000
- Location: 42°30′19″N 1°31′30″E
- Website: https://www.techtitute.com/us/

TECH Global University is a cluster of private universities with an international and digital character, which offers its own private and official online undergraduate, graduate and postgraduate degrees. It has more than 14,000 university programs offered in 11 different languages, including professional master's degrees, hybrid professional master's degrees, postgraduate diplomas, postgraduate certificates, executive development programs and certified language courses, among others. It operates as an online university in 150 countries in Europe, America, Africa, Asia and Oceania.

== History ==
TECH Global University was founded in 2005 by a team of professionals and academics from the field of university education in Europe. Its digital nature has oriented its educational proposal towards a completely online environment, using a methodology that moves away from traditional paradigms.

The institution is organized as an international cluster of private digital universities, focused on continuing and postgraduate education. This cluster is led by Tech Education Rights & Technologies SL, a Spanish-owned technology company.

TECH's parent company was recognized by Financial Times as one of the 200 fastest growing companies in Europe in 2017 and 2018.

In February 2019, the university entered into a strategic agreement with Harvard Business Publishing, becoming the first online university to incorporate Harvard Business School Cases into its academic offerings.

In February 2022, TECH signed a multi-year agreement with the National Basketball Association, becoming the official online university of the NBA.

In 2023, TECH was named Google Partner Premier, a distinction awarded to 3% of the world's companies.

TECH is currently an official university in Spain, Andorra, Mexico, Tanzania and Morocco.

== Faculties and Schools ==
TECH Global University offers its educational programs in twenty online faculties and two postgraduate schools. They offer doctoral degrees, advanced master's degrees, undergraduate degrees, continuing education master's degrees, hybrid master's degrees, official master's degrees, postgraduate certificates, internship programs, postgraduate diplomas, university courses, executive development programs, certified language courses, online individual language classes, online group language classes, language placement tests and language exams.

1. Faculty of Sports Science
2. Faculty of Law
3. Faculty of Design
4. Faculty of Education
5. Faculty of Nursing
6. School of Languages
7. School of Business
8. Faculty of Pharmacy
9. Faculty of Physiotherapy
10. Faculty of Humanities
11. Faculty of Information Technology
12. Faculty of Engineering
13. Faculty of Artificial Intelligence
14. Faculty of Medicine
15. Faculty of Nutrition
16. Faculty of Dentistry
17. Faculty of Journalism and Communication
18. Faculty of Psychology
19. Faculty of Veterinary Medicine
20. Faculty of Video Games Design

== Methodology ==
TECH Global University uses the Relearning system as a learning methodology, which is based on the directed reiteration of key concepts. It is a learning system repeated over time, self-managed by the student and directed by a professional teacher, with the objective of helping the student overcome the forgetting curve established by the German psychologist Hermann Ebbinghaus.

Relearning is combined with the Harvard Business School Cases after having reached an agreement with Harvard Business Publishing to incorporate this material, along with other teaching resources, including online simulations, technical notes and current business articles.
