= Elzira Dantas Machado =

Portuguese feminist and First Lady of Portugal

Elzira Dantas Machado GCC
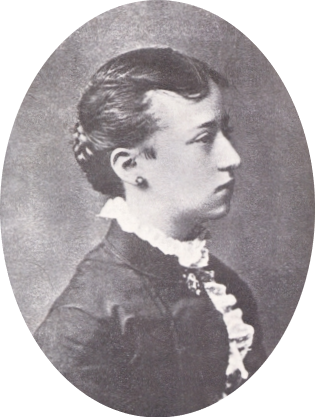

First Lady of Portugal
- In role 11 December 1925 – 31 May 1926
- Preceded by: Belmira das Neves
- Succeeded by: Maria das Dores Cabeçadas
- In role 5 October 1915 – 5 December 1917
- Preceded by: Position vacant
- Succeeded by: Maria dos Prazeres Pais

Personal details
- Born: Elzira Dantas Gonçalves Pereira; 15 December 1865 Rio de Janeiro, Brazil
- Died: 22 April 1942 (aged 76) Porto, Portugal
- Spouse: Bernardino Machado (m. 1882)
- Children: 19 children

Elzira Dantas Gonçalves Pereira Machado GCC (15 December 1865 – 22 April 1942) was a Portuguese feminist activist. From 1882 until her death in 1942, she was the wife of Bernardino Machado, two-time President of the Portuguese Republic and, as such, was the First Lady of Portugal from 1915 to 1917 and again from 1925 to 1926.

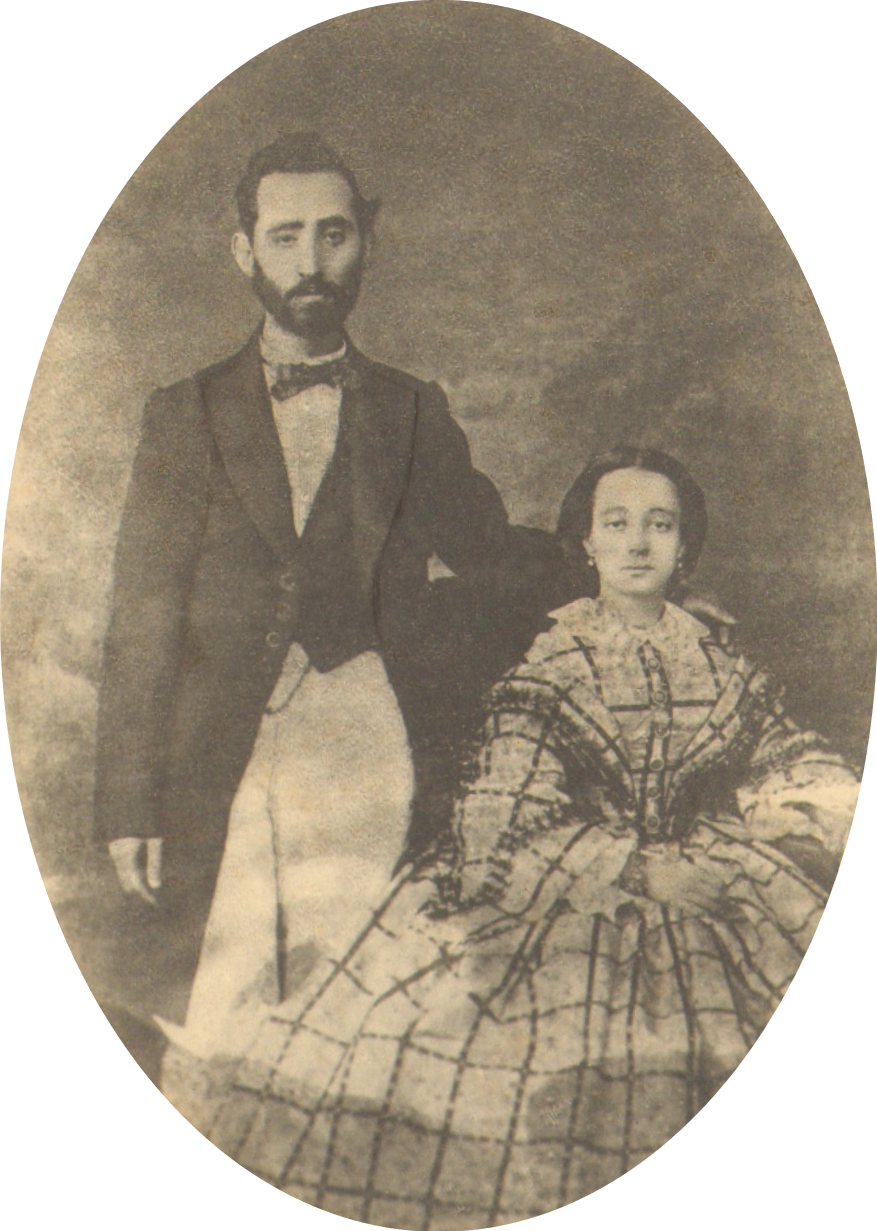
Miguel Dantas Gonçalves Pereira and Bernardina Maria da Silva, Elzira Dantas Machado's parents

== Biography ==
Her father, Miguel Dantas Gonçalves Pereira, from Formariz, Paredes de Coura, established himself in Rio de Janeiro, Empire of Brazil, as a partner in a commercial firm, in 1860. There, he married a Brazilian lady, Bernardina da Silva, and Elzira Dantas was their only daughter. Bernardina died soon after, and Miguel Dantas Gonçalves Pereira and his daughter returned to Portugal. Her father remarried in April 1876, with his cousin Maria de Assunção Gonçalves Pereira.

Raised in an affluent family, Elzira received a thorough education by foreign preceptresses. Her education, influenced by the Regeneration values of economic progress and social usefulness, no doubt prepared her to assume the role of wife and mother. She, however, was involved in the movement for women's emancipation from a young age.

At age 17, on 19 January 1882, she married Bernardino Machado, then a young professor at the University of Coimbra. In the years that followed, the couple would have a total of nineteen children. Her husband was then starting a political career with the Regenerator Party but, after serving as a member of Parliament and briefly as a government minister, grew disillusioned with the monarchical establishment and joined the Portuguese Republican Party. Through her husband, Elzira Dantas Machado corresponded with several prominent republican and feminist intellectuals, such as Alice Pestana, Ana de Castro Osório, Maria Veleda, Carmen de Burgos.

In 1909, she was one of the founders of the Republican League of Portuguese Women, which she then abandoned for the Association of Feminist Propaganda.

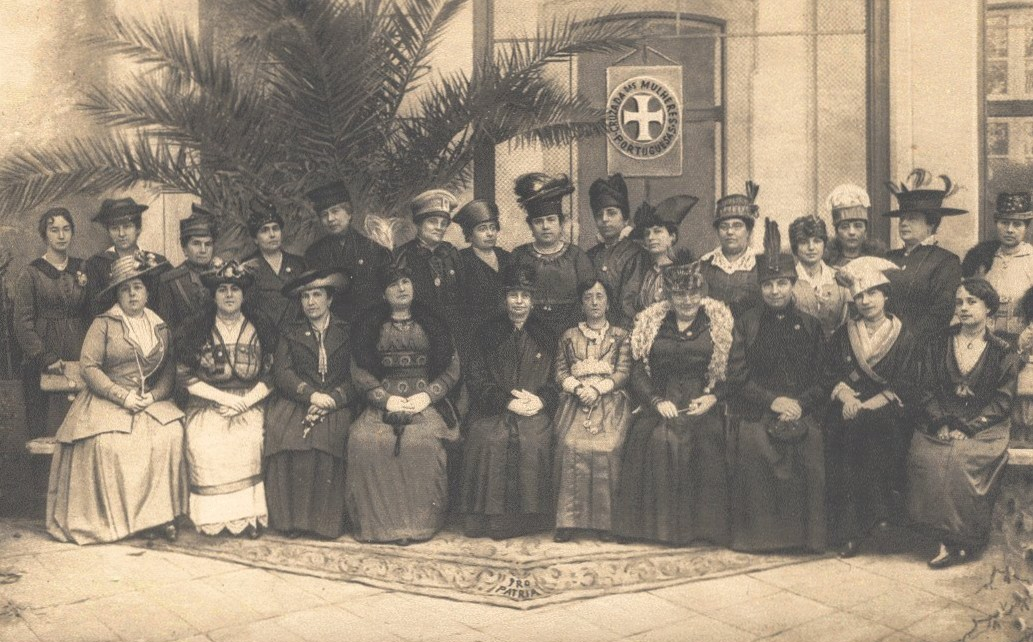
Members of the Portuguese Women's Crusade: Elzira Dantas Machado is the woman in the front row, fifth from right to left.

Following the overthrow of the monarchy in 1910, her husband occupied several important offices; government minister, ambassador and, briefly, in 1914, Prime Minister. In 1915, her husband was elected President of the Republic. With the start of the First World War and Portugal's participation in the conflict, Elzira Dantas Machado helped create the Portuguese Women's Crusade in 1916, with the purpose of aiding soldiers and their families. In December 1917, a revolutionary junta led by Sidónio Pais staged a coup d'état that overthrew the government led by Prime Minister Costa and President Machado. Elzira Dantas accompanied her husband into exhile in France.

They returned to Portugal in August 1919, following Pais's assassination. That year, on 12 June, President Canto e Castro made Elzira Dantas Machado a Grand Cross of the Order of Christ, on the same day the Portuguese Women's Crusade was made a Grand Cross of the Order of the Tower and of the Sword, of Valour, Loyalty and Merit.

Her husband was elected President a second time, in 1925. By then, the political decline of the First Portuguese Republic was accentuating and, in May 1926, a military coup initiated a dictatorial regime. Elzira Dantas Machado again accompanied her husband into exhile, in France and Spain. During the Second World War and the Fall of France, in 1940, Salazar's government allows the Machados to return to Portugal.

Elzira Dantas Machado died in 1942, in the Hospital of the Third Order of St. Francis, in Porto.

== Distinctions ==
=== National orders ===
- Grand Cross of the Order of Christ (12 June 1919).

Honorary titles
Preceded by Position vacant	First Lady of Portugal; 1915–1917	Succeeded by Maria dos Prazeres Pais
Preceded by Belmira das Neves	First Lady of Portugal; 1925–1926	Succeeded by Maria das Dores Cabeçadas
