= Maria Cavaco Silva =

First Lady of Portugal from 2006 to 2010

Maria Cavaco Silva GCIH
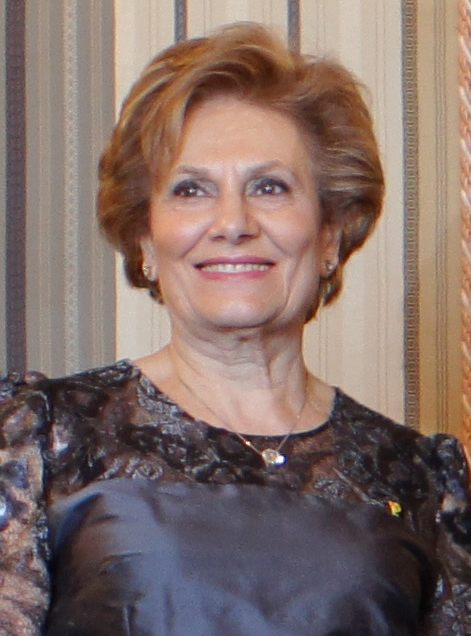
- Cavaco Silva in 2014

First Lady of Portugal
- In role 9 March 2006 – 9 March 2016
- President: Aníbal Cavaco Silva
- Preceded by: Maria José Ritta
- Succeeded by: Margarida Maldonado Freitas (2026)

Personal details
- Born: 19 March 1937 (age 89) São Bartolomeu de Messines, Silves, Algarve, Portugal
- Spouse: Aníbal Cavaco Silva (m. 1963)
- Children: 2
- Education: University of Lisbon

Maria Alves da Silva Cavaco Silva GCIH (born 19 March 1937) is the wife of Aníbal Cavaco Silva, the 19th President of the Portuguese Republic and, as such, was the First Lady of Portugal from 2006 until 2016.

A professor of Portuguese Language and Culture, she has been dedicating her attention to education and culture issues, but also to social solidarity and cohesion.

== Biography ==
Maria Cavaco Silva was born Maria Alves da Silva, to Francisco dos Santos Silva and Adelina de Jesus Pincho, on 19 March 1937 in São Bartolomeu de Messines, Silves (Algarve). Her mother died in her youth, and she ended up being raised by her uncle and aunt in Lisbon.

She Licentiated in Germanic Philology from the University of Lisbon in 1960. Her final thesis was about "Yearning (saudade) in Hölderlin's Poetry". She also has a degree in Pedagogical Sciences from that same university, and began working as a teacher in 1960, in the Colégio das Doroteias. She has also taught in the Liceu Passos Manuel, Liceu Rainha D. Leonor and Liceu D. João de Castro, all of them in Lisbon.

It was while holidaying in the Algarve that she met Aníbal Cavaco Silva, whom she married on 20 October 1963. Later that same year, her husband was summoned for military duty in the Colonial War, in the then-Portuguese Overseas Province of Mozambique, and Maria Cavaco Silva accompanied him. She lived in Lourenço Marques (modern-day Maputo), where she taught Portuguese language and foreign languages at Liceu Salazar and Liceu D. Ana da Costa Portugal. In 1971, they both moved to York, in England, while her husband studied economics in the University of York. Once there, Maria Cavaco Silva attended German and Italian courses at the Language Teaching Centre, and taught Portuguese privately to foreigners. Simultaneously, she enjoyed the opportunity to deepen her knowledge of English culture and language. The Cavaco Silvas returned to Portugal in 1974.

In 1977, Maria became a lecturer of Portuguese language of the Philosophy course at the Catholic University, in Lisbon. Starting in 1981, she taught the same subject in the Theology course, and the Portuguese Language and Culture subject of the Law course of the Faculty of Human Sciences of that University. Still in this Faculty, she headed, in July/August 1985, the Luso-American summer course about "The Portuguese Language in Contemporary Portuguese Novels". She then began teaching the Annual Portuguese Course for Foreigners, in the Socrates/Erasmus programme, which she led until 2006. Today, she is still connected to that University, and occasionally gives lectures on Literature and Portuguese Culture. She was teaching there during her husband's term as Prime Minister of Portugal (from 1985 to 1995)

On 22 January 2006, her husband was elected President of Portugal, with 50,6% of the votes. She became the First Lady of Portugal, succeeding Maria José Ritta, Jorge Sampaio's wife, in March of that year. Her activity agenda included the challenges that families and the youth face in today's world, or the new demands in social assistance. As it had already happened in the 1980s and the 1990s, when her husband was prime minister, attending official acts and institutional events, as well as contacting with organisations, associations and several entities of the civil society, is a large part of her daily routine. The couple currently has two children and five grandchildren.

== Honours ==
=== National ===
- Portugal:
  - Grand Cross of the Order of Prince Henry (9 March 2017)

=== Foreign ===
- Austria: Grand Decoration of Honour in Gold with Sash of the Decoration of Honour for Services to the Republic of Austria (31 August 2009)
- Brazil: Grand Cross of the Order of the Southern Cross (22 April 2008)
- Chile: Grand Cross of the Order of Bernardo O'Higgins (16 November 2010)
- Colombia: Grand Cross of the Order of Boyacá (14 November 2012)
- Germany: Grand Cross 1st Class of the Order of Merit of the Federal Republic of Germany (26 May 2009)
- Holy See: Dame Grand Cross of the Order of St. Gregory the Great (30 August 2010)
- Jordan:
  - Grand Cordon with Brilliants (Special Class) of the Supreme Order of the Renaissance (10 December 2009)
  - Grand Cordon of the Supreme Order of the Renaissance (28 May 2009)
- Lithuania: Grand Cross of the Order of Vytautas the Great (25 July 2007)
- Luxembourg: Grand Cross of the Order of Adolphe of Nassau (9 September 2010)
- Malta: Honorary Member of the Xirka Ġieħ ir-Repubblika (11 December 2008)
- Mexico: Sash of Special Category of the Order of the Aztec Eagle (2 June 2014)
- Norway: Grand Cross of the Royal Norwegian Order of Merit (5 November 2008)
- Panama: Grand Cross of the Order of Manuel Amador Guerrero (30 July 2013)
- Qatar: Collar of the Order of Merit (10 December 2009)
- Poland:
  - Grand Cross of the Order of Merit of the Republic of Poland (6 July 2012)
  - Grand Cross of the Order of Polonia Restituta (1 October 2008)
- Sovereign Military Order of Malta: Grand Cross of the Order pro Merito Melitensi (23 November 2010)
- Spain: Dame Grand Cross of the Order of Isabella the Catholic (24 September 2006)
- Sweden: Member Grand Cross of the Order of the Polar Star (9 May 2008)

Honorary titles
Preceded by Maria José Ritta	First Lady of Portugal; 2006–2016	Vacant Title next held by Margarida Maldonado Freitas
