= María Eugenia del Valle =

Chilean-Bolivian historian and university professor (1928–1994)

- Born: 1928; Santiago, Chile
- Died: 17 January 1994 (aged 65–66); La Paz, Bolivia
- Education: Central University of Madrid
- Occupations: Historian, researcher, professor
- Employers: University of Valparaíso; Higher University of San Andrés
- Spouse: Jorge Siles Salinas (m. 1957)
- Children: Juan Ignacio Siles del Valle
- Relatives: Jaime del Valle Alliende (brother)
- Awards: Order of the Condor of the Andes (1993)

María Eugenia del Valle de Siles (1928 – 17 January 1994) was a Chilean-Bolivian historian, researcher, and university professor.

== Biography ==
María Eugenia del Valle was born in Santiago in 1928. She earned a licentiate as a historian from the University of Chile. With the aid of a scholarship, she completed her doctoral studies at the Central University of Madrid. In 1957, she married the Bolivian essayist and diplomat Jorge Siles Salinas, whom she met in Madrid, and they moved to Bolivia in the mid-1960s. She taught History of America and Universal History at the University of Valparaíso, and in 1966 she became Professor of History of America and Modern Universal History at the Higher University of San Andrés in La Paz.

She was the sister of Chilean Foreign Minister Jaime del Valle Alliende, and the mother of Juan Ignacio Siles del Valle, Foreign Minister of Bolivia from 2003 to 2005.

María Eugenia del Valle died in La Paz, where she had established her residence, on 17 January 1994.

== Awards and recognitions ==
- 1991: Made a member of the Bolivian Academy of History
- 1993: Order of the Condor of the Andes from the government of Bolivia
- 1993: Culture Award from the Manuel Vicente Ballivián Foundation

== Work ==
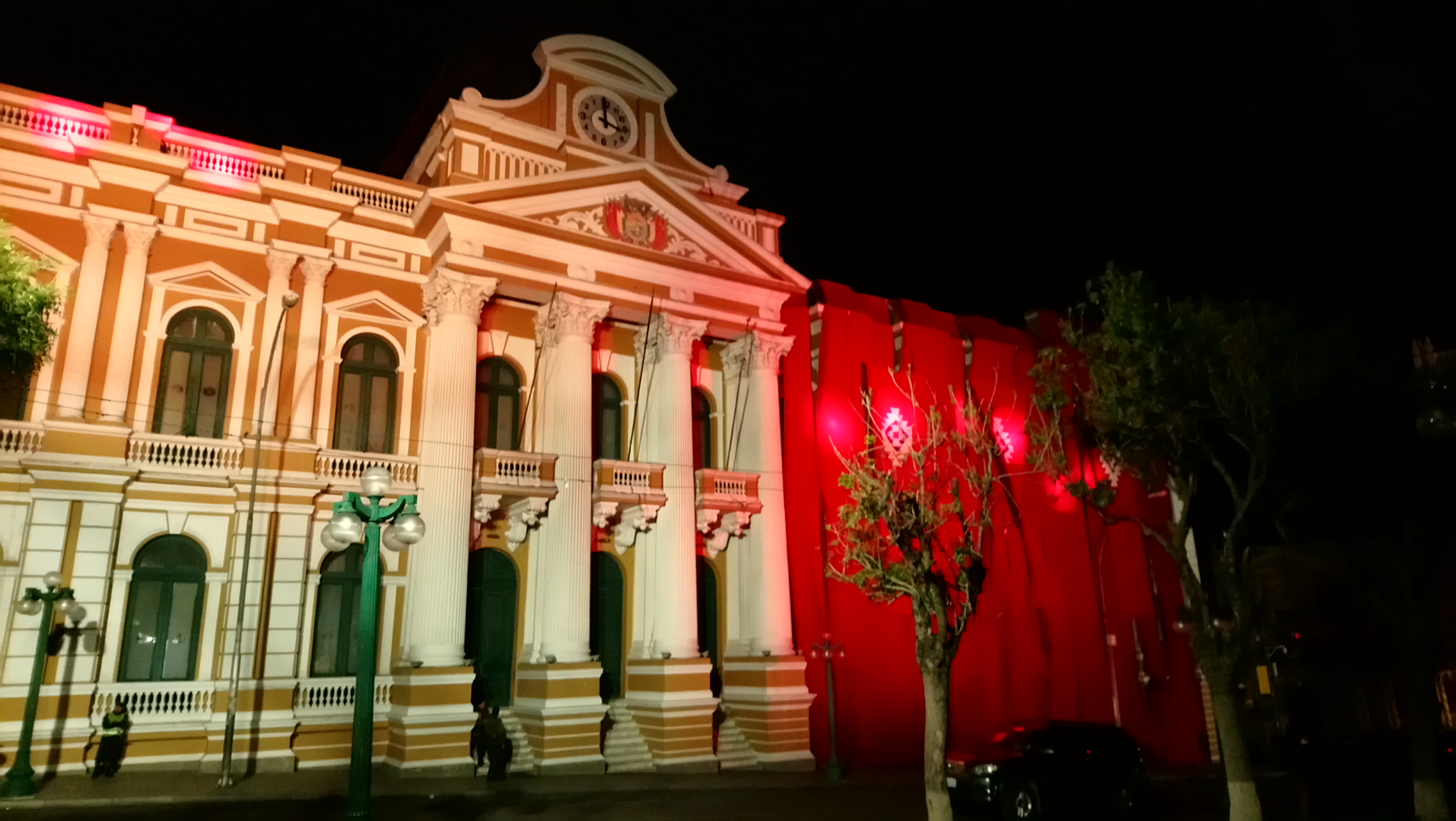
Legislative Palace of Bolivia during the civic event celebrating the reissue of the book Historia de la Rebelión de Tupaj Katari

Her work as a researcher and historian focused on the issue of the indigenous rebellions of the 18th century by consulting the archives of Bolivia, Buenos Aires, Madrid, and Seville. Her publications include:

- Testimonios del cerco de La Paz: El campo contra la ciudad, 1781 (1980)
- Diario del alzamiento de indios conjurados contra la ciudad de Nuestra Señora de La Paz, 1781 (1981)
- Bartolina Sisa, Gregoria Apaza. Dos heroínas indígenas (1981), Biblioteca Popular Boliviana de Ultima Hora
- Historia de la Rebelión de Tupaj Katari 1781–1782 (1990)

Her final work, Historia de la Rebelión de Tupaj Katari, was selected for the collection of the Bicentennial Library of Bolivia. It was presented on 29 November 2017 through a civic event that recreated the caravan of Túpac Katari and Bartolina Sisa.
