= Maria Barroso =

First Lady of Portugal from 1986 to 1996

Maria Barroso GCL
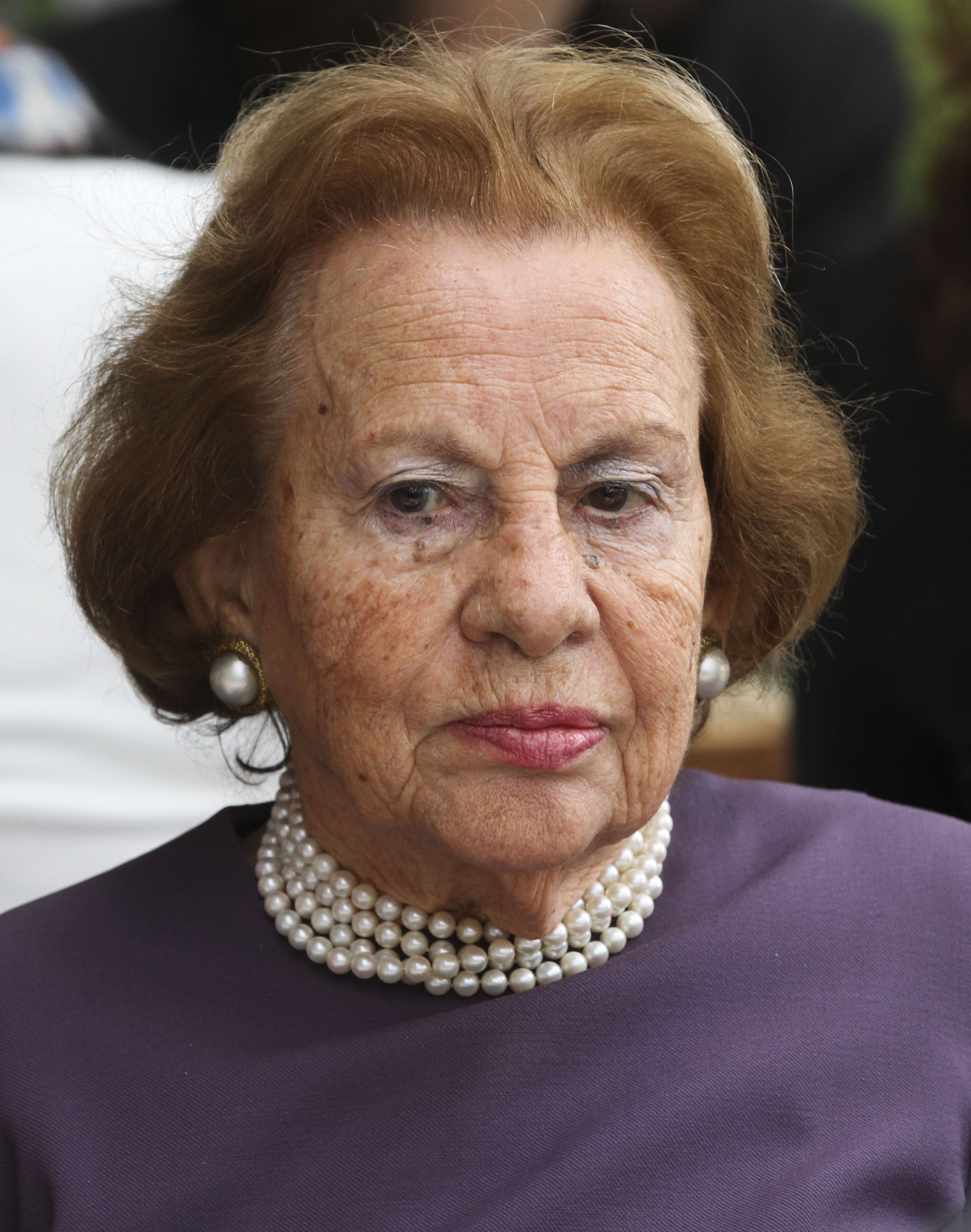
- Barroso in 2013

First Lady of Portugal
- In role 9 March 1986 – 9 March 1996
- President: Mário Soares
- Preceded by: Manuela Ramalho Eanes
- Succeeded by: Maria José Ritta

Member of the Assembly of the Republic Elections: 1976, 1979, 1980, 1983
- In office 3 June 1976 – 13 November 1980
- In office 31 May 1983 – 4 November 1985

Personal details
- Born: Maria de Jesus Simões Barroso; 2 May 1925 Fuseta, First Portuguese Republic
- Died: 7 July 2015 (aged 90) São Domingos de Benfica, Portugal
- Resting place: Prazeres Cemetery, Lisbon
- Party: Socialist Party
- Spouse: Mário Soares (1949–2015)
- Children: João Barroso Soares; Isabel Barroso Soares
- Education: University of Lisbon
- Occupation: Politician; Actress
- Profession: Teacher

Maria de Jesus Simões Barroso Soares (2 May 1925 – 7 July 2015) was a Portuguese actress, teacher and political and social activist, having been one of the founders of the Socialist Party (PS), in Germany, in 1973. As the wife of the 17th President of Portugal, Mário Soares, she was the first-lady of the country between 1986 and 1996.

== Family ==
Barroso was the daughter of military Alfredo José Barroso (Alvor, 15 April 1887 – Campo Grande, Lisbon, 14 January 1970) and Maria da Encarnação Simões, born in Coimbra, they married in Alvor in 1912. She's the paternal granddaughter of José Barroso de Sousa and his wife Maria de Jesus Barroso and the maternal granddaughter of Manuel dos Santos and his wife Maria da Rainha Santa.

She was the paternal aunt of Alfredo Barroso and the maternal aunt of Mário Barroso, Eduardo Barroso and Graça Barroso.

== Biography ==
She came from a big family - she was the fifth of seven siblings - Maria de Jesus Barroso was there for the family's move, from Fuseta to Setúbal and, then, from Setúbal to Lisbon. Her father, an opposer to the dictatorship, was arrested in the Lisbon Penitentiary and was deported to the Azores, where he was jailed in the Angra do Heroísmo Fort. After her primary education, that she did in Setúbal and Lisbon, she attended the secondary schools of D. Filipa de Lencastre and Pedro Nunes.

In her adolescence she gained an interest for theater and the art of spoken poetry, what led her to attend the Course of Dramatic Art in the National Conservatory Theater School. She ended her studies in 1943. She was a director and teacher of Art of Saying in the Colégio Moderno, replacing Manuel Lereno. Through the actor Assis Pacheco she enters the prestigious theater company Rey Colaço-Robles Monteiro, based in the D. Maria II National Theatre, replacing Maria Lalande. She debuted in 1944 in Aparências (Appearances), of Jacinto Benavente, directed by Palmira Bastos, and had prominent interpretation in Benilde ou a Virgem Mãe (Benilde or the Virgin Mother) of José Régio. Circa 1946, after acting in Coimbra A Casa da Bernarda Alba (The House of Bernarda Alba), of Federico García Lorca, she's prevented from remaining in that company by interference of PIDE.

While being an actress, Barroso continued her studies in the Faculty of Arts, Lisbon, where she would obtain a degree in Historical and Philosophical Sciences, in 1951. It was in college that she met Mário Soares, whom she would marry on 22 February 1949, by proxy (but registered at the 3rd Conservatory of the Civil Register of Lisbon). Soares was then jailed for political reasons. With Soares, Barroso had two children, politician João Soares, born 1949, and psychologist Isabel Barroso Soares, born 1951, who manages the Colégio Moderno in Lisbon.

After being stopped from working in theater, Barroso would also be forbidden by the government to be a teacher. She applied for an internship for admission to teach, not having been accepted in a public school, choosing to do an internship in Colégio Moderno, ran by her father-in-law João Soares. After two years, however, her license to teach in private schools would be revoked by the National Education Ministry. She would manage the family school and only after the Carnation Revolution would she, legally, act as its director.

She would return to acting, in Antígona (1965) in the Teatro Villaret, and in cinema, with the emergency of the Cinema Novo Português, acting in Paulo Soares da Rocha's movie, Mudar de Vida (To Change Life), debuting in 1966. In the 70s and 80s she acted in Manoel de Oliveira's movies (1985 - Le Soulier de Satin, 1979 - Amor de Perdição, 1975 - Benilde ou a Virgem Mãe).

In 1968, Barroso accompanies her husband when he is deported to São Tomé, where she is again prevented from teaching. Later, in the 70s, when the Marcello Caetano government allows Soares to exile in Paris, Barroso returns to Portugal, continuing to manage the family school.

In 1969, Barroso ran as a deputy for the CEUD (Electoral Commission of Democratic Unity), led by Mário Soares, and where Catholics and monarchists involved in the democratic opposition to the regime would insert themselves. In 1973, she participated in the III Congress of Democratic Oopposition, in Aveiro, being the only women to intervene in the opening session.

She was one of the seven people to vote against the transformation of the Portuguese Socialist Action into a political party, against the official stand of Mário Soares.

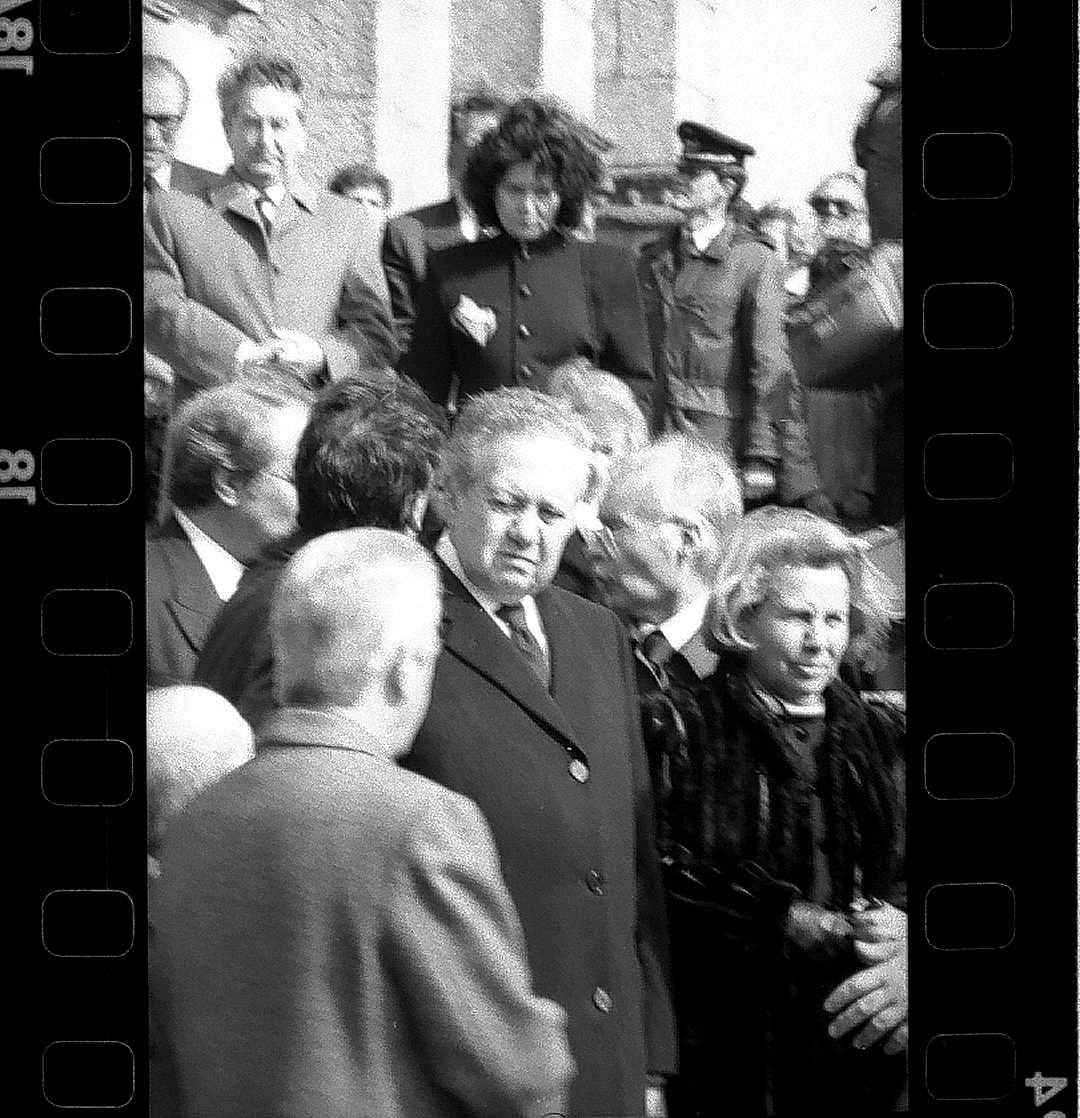
Mário Soares and Maria Barroso in Porto's Bishop's funeral, D. António Ferreira Gomes, in 1989

After the Carnation Revolution, Barroso was elected as a deputy of the Assembly of the Republic, successively, for Santarém, Porto, and Faro, in the legislatures started in 1976, 1979, 1980 and 1983.

Although not as politically involved as her husband, Maria Barroso was a founding member of the Socialist Party in Bad Münstereifel, Germany in 1973.

In 1986, Soares is elected President of the Republic and Barroso takes on the role of First Lady of Portugal (1986–1996). As the First Lady, her intervention was directed towards the defense of the family sense and fighting against social exclusion and all forms of violence, participating in numerous initiatives in Portugal and other Portuguese speaking countries. In 1990, she created the Mozambique Emergency movement, granting, in the following year, the scripture of the Association for the Study and Prevention of Violence. In 1995, she presided over the opening of the cycle of realizations for the International Year of Fighting against racism, xenophobia, antisemitism and social exclusion.

After leaving the Belém Palace, in 1997, she became the president of the Portuguese Red Cross, position she held until 2003. She was also a founding partner and president of the Administration Council of ONGD, since 1994 until her death, and also presided over the Aristides Sousa Mendes Foundation.

She was awarded a Honoris Causa doctorate by the Lesley University (23 May 1994), by the University of Aveiro (16 December 1996), by the University of Lisbon (3 November 1999) and by the Universidade Lusófona in 2012. She was an honorary professor of the Society of International Studies of Madrid. And also received a Grand Cross of the Order of Liberty on 7 March 1997.

She was a member of the Portuguese National Theater Company and one of the most famous theater and cinema actresses in Portugal. In April 2000 she read the poetry of Sophia de Mello Breyner Andresen at the United Nations in New York in homage to Aristides Sousa Mendes. She was involved in activities aimed at supporting the areas of culture, education and family, childhood, social solidarity, female dimension, health, the integration of the disabled and the prevention of violence.

== Illness and death ==
On 25 June 2015, Maria Barroso came under medical care at Lisbon’s Red Cross Hospital after falling at home. She was transported to the hospital by her nephew Eduardo Barroso, a well-known hepato-biliary surgeon, walking in by her own foot. An initial CT scan revealed nothing serious; however, her condition worsened during the subsequent hours, and new exams revealed an extensive intracranial hemorrhage. She entered a deep coma, and Eduardo Barroso classified the situation as "critical" and "most likely irreversible". She died in the morning of 7 July 2015.

== Honours and awards ==
=== Honours ===
==== National honours ====
- Portugal: Grand Cross of the Order of Liberty (7 March 1997)
- (Kingdom of Portugal) Portuguese Royal Family: Honorary Dame Grand Cross of the Royal Order of Saint Isabel (3 July 2002)

==== Foreign honours ====
- Brazil: Grand Cross of the Order of Rio Branco (25 July 1989)
- Bulgaria: 1st Class of the Order of the Rose (26 October 1994)
- Colombia: Grand Cross of the National Order of Merit (8 January 1991)
- Denmark: Grand Cross of the Order of the Dannebrog (3 August 1992)
- Finland: Grand Cross of the Order of the White Rose of Finland (8 March 1991)
- France: Grand Cross of the National Order of Merit (7 May 1990)
- Germany: Grand Cross 1st Class of the Order of Merit of the Federal Republic of Germany (9 January 1991)
- Greece: Grand Cross of the Order of the Phoenix (17 May 1983)
- Hungary: First Class of the Order of the Flag of the People's Republic of Hungary (25 November 1982)
- Luxembourg: Dame Grand Cross of the Order of Adolphe of Nassau (9 January 1990)
- Morocco: Grand Cordon of the Order of Ouissam Alaouite (20 February 1995)
- Spain: Dame Grand Cross of the Order of Charles III (30 March 1988)
- Sweden: Member Grand Cross of the Royal Order of the Polar Star (28 January 1987)
- Venezuela: Grand Cross of the Order of Francisco de Miranda (18 November 1987)
- Zaire: Grand Collar of the National Order of Zaire (4 December 1989)

=== Awards ===
- Doctor Honoris Causa by the University of Aveiro
- Doctor Honoris Causa by the University of Lisbon
- Doctor Honoris Causa by Lesley College, Boston
- Honorary Professor of the Society of International Studies, Madrid
- Award "Impegno Per La Pace" of the Association Insieme per la Pace, Rome
- Award "Beca" by the Colégio Mayor Zurbaran, Madrid
- Gold Medal for Distinct Service from the League of Portuguese Firemen
- Medal of Solidarity from CNAF
- Recipient of the Red Cross Medal of Portugal
- Silver Medal of the Alcuin Award
- Gold Medal from FERLAP
- Gold Medal from the City of Ovar
- Gold Medal from the City of Olhão
- Gold Medal from the City of Faro
- Algarvia (lady from the Algarve region) of the Year 1997 by the Association of the Algarve’s Regional Press
- Personality of the Year 1998 in the area of solidarity by the Magazine Revista Gente e Viagem
- Most Elegant Woman of the Year 1998 – Magazine VIP
- Neckband of the International Academy of Portuguese Culture
- "One in ten women of the year 1999" Prize – Brazil
- D. Antónia Ferreira Prize
- Prestige Prize
- "Manus Cais" Trophy
- "Lonely Life" Prize – Radio Central FM, Leiria
