= Instituto Superior de Ciências Sociais e Políticas =

The Instituto Superior de Ciências Sociais e Políticas (ISCSP) (Institute of Social and Political Sciences) is part of the University of Lisbon (ULisboa). It was known in the early 20th century as the Colonial School, when it was run by the Geographical Society of Lisbon. In 2016, ISCSP celebrated 110 years of continuous operation. As a higher education institution, ISCSP aims to equip students with skills in the cultural, scientific and technical fields; conduct fundamental and applied research; provide community service; and promote exchanges in the social and political sciences.

== History of Escola Colonial (Colonial School) ==
The Colonial School was established by a decree of 18 January 1906 of the Portuguese Navy and Overseas Affairs Ministry. The decree created the School within the Geography Society of Lisbon, entrusting it to the same Society, under the overall inspection of the Government. The School had the special purpose of instructing those who were to participate in the operation of the Portuguese overseas possessions. On 4 October 1906, a decree approving the provisional regulation of the Colonial School was published, and on 13 November of the same year, the ordinance approving its provisional programmes was passed.

== Functions of Colonial School ==
At the Colonial School, young men were recruited at an early stage to join the colonial administration. They manned the system and occupied positions in lower levels of the colonial machine. The graduates of the school moved up gradually to assume administrative and technical responsibilities in the different services that were created over the years in the process of development and transformation of the political and administrative organization of the so-called Overseas Territories.

== Early Evolution ==
In the context of the Portuguese Empire, ever since its creation, the School was subject constantly to changing ideas about Portugal's overseas policies, which was reflected in the School's various designations and instruction syllabuses. The "Colonial Course" had its initial study plan altered in 1919. The new name "General Colonial Course" was adopted. The course was expressly defined as higher education.

In 1927, the School changed its name to Escola Superior Colonial (ESC). The Colonial Course was replaced in 1946 by courses in "Colonial Administration" and "Higher Colonial Studies". In 1954, the ESC was given a new name, Instituto Superior de Estudos Ultramarinos (ISEU) or Higher Institute of Overseas Studies.

== Integration with Technical University of Lisbon ==
In 1961, the ISEU joined the Universidade Técnica de Lisboa (Technical University of Lisbon). Its overall mission remained largely the same: to deliver higher education in the "Overseas Sciences"; prepare staff for overseas administration in Portuguese Angola, Portuguese Guinea, Portuguese Mozambique, Portuguese São Tomé and Príncipe and Portuguese Timor; and promote scientific studies of Portugal's Overseas Territories, the people and their languages.

In 1961, the list of subjects was revised and the taught courses came to be called the "Overseas Administration Course" and "Complementary Course of Overseas Studies".

In 1962, the ISEU was renamed the Instituto Superior de Ciências Sociais e Política Ultramarina (ISCSPU) or School of Social Sciences and Overseas Policy. Along this decade, the educational curricula expanded. New courses in Sociology and Anthropology were added, which made ISCSPU the first institution in Portugal to teach these academic subjects.

In 1972 undergraduate degrees in Economics, "Labour Sciences" and Social Sciences were added.

== Post-April 25 Revolution Era ==
With drastic political regime change, after 25 April 1974, the institution, along with other universities and higher education institutes, went through a difficult period.

In December 1976 the restructuring ended. The institution has since been called Instituto Superior de Ciências Sociais e Políticas (ISCSP), which in direct translation means Institute of Social and Political Sciences.

In the academic year 1977-1978, ISCSP resumed with a degree course in Political and Social Sciences which provisionally replaced the old syllabus.

In 1980, by a decree dated 17 May, degree courses in Management and Public Administration, Social Communication, Anthropology and Social Work — later renamed Social Policy — were created.

In the 1980s, ISCSP started to offer undergraduate courses in International Relations and Sociology of Work. By the end of the 1990s, an undergraduate programme in Political Science was added.

== Integration with University of Lisbon ==
In 2013, ISCSP was integrated into the new University of Lisbon, as a result of the merger of the University of Lisbon (1911-2013) with the Technical University of Lisbon.

== Courses ==
=== Compliance with Bologna Process ===
The institution underwent changes to comply with the requirements of the Bologna Process. Currently, ISCSP offers nine undergraduate courses, fourteen master's courses and twelve doctoral courses, in full compliance with the Bologna Agreement. They are the 1st, 2nd and 3rd study cycles, respectively.

=== Undergraduate Degrees ===
- Public Administration;
- Public Policy and Territorial Administration (after-work);
- Anthropology (daytime);
- Political Science (daytime);
- Communication Sciences (daytime);
- Human Resources Management (after-work);
- International Relations;
- Social Work;
- Sociology

=== Master's ===
- Anthropology;
- Social Communication;
- Political Science;
- Strategy;
- African Studies;
- Family and Gender;
- Management and Public Policy;
- MPA - Public Administration;
- Social Policy;
- Development Policies of Human Resources;
- International Relations;
- Society, Risk and Health;
- Sociology;
- Sociology of Organizations and Labour;

In 2009, the MPA (Master in Public Administration) was created, the academic year beginning in 2009/2010.

=== Doctorates ===
- Public Administration;
- Anthropology;
- Political Science;
- Strategic Studies;
- Social policy;
- International Relations;
- Sociology

== Buildings and Facilities ==
ISCSP is currently housed in its own building on the University Campus at Alto da Ajuda. ISCSP has a total of 40 classrooms, of which 5 are amphitheatres, spread over 4 floors. All rooms are equipped with overhead projectors, multimedia and computers. ISCSP has a general library covering an area of 2,029 m^{2}, with capacity for 194 users, and four multi-purpose rooms and three study rooms of varying capacities, open from 8:00 to 21:00. It also has a stationery shop, photocopying centre, a canteen-bar, two ATM machines and a bank counter. The entire building is disability-friendly.
