= Universidad Nuestra Señora de La Paz =

Our Lady of La Paz University
- Universidad Nuestra Señora de La Paz
- Established: April 24, 1992; 33 years ago
- President: Jorge Paz Navajas
- Location: La Paz, Bolivia; 16.51206046662°S 68.12863226803636°W
- Campus: La Paz
- Website: www.unslp.edu.bo

Universidad Nuestra Señora de La Paz (UNSLP) (English: Our Lady of La Paz University), founded on April 24, 1992, is a private nonprofit university located in La Paz, Bolivia. It is one of the oldest private universities in Bolivia. It is composed of six academic faculties:

- Architecture and construction
- Administrative and economic sciences
- Political and social sciences
- Engineering
- Medicine
- Dentistry

It also has master's programs in business administration and journalism. As of July 30, 2023, there are more than 3,200 students enrolled in classes, with more than 230 teachers and professors as well as at least 50 additional administrative staff.
