= First Lady of Portugal =

Unofficial title of the wife of the president of Portugal

- Primeira-dama de Portugal
- Coat of Arms of the Portuguese Republic

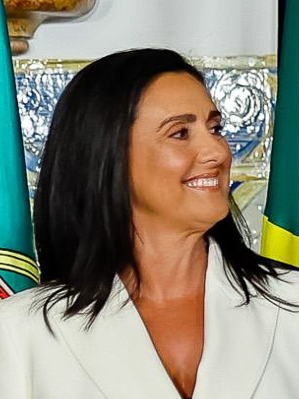
- Incumbent; Margarida Maldonado Freitas since 9 March 2026
- Residence: Belém Palace
- Term length: 5 years (10 years if the President wins re-election)
- Inaugural holder: Lucrécia de Arriaga
- Formation: 24 August 1911; 115 years ago
- Website: Presidency of the Portuguese Republic - First Lady (defunct)

First Lady of Portugal (Portuguese: primeira-dama) is the unofficial title attributed to the wife or Partner of the president of Portugal. To date, there has been no first gentleman of Portugal. The position is occupied by Margarida Maldonado Freitas since the presidential inauguration of António José Seguro in 2026.

== History ==
The inaugural first lady of Portugal was Lucrécia de Arriaga (1911–1915), wife of the first president of the First Portuguese Republic, Manuel de Arriaga.

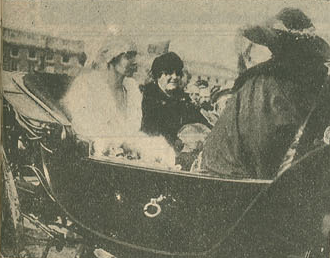
Maria Joana Queiroga de Almeida sitting with Elisabeth, Queen of the Belgians in 1920

Maria Joana Queiroga de Almeida, Portugal's first lady from 1919 to 1923 and the wife of President António José de Almeida, was one of the country's first first ladies to take on public, ceremonial roles. She took on a very public role in 1920 as the hostess during the official state visit of Leopold III of Belgium, the then-heir to the Belgian throne, in 1920. By contrast, Almeida's successor, Belmira das Neves, first lady from 1923 to 1925, largely avoided the public spotlight, but played a supporting role to her husband, Manuel Teixeira Gomes, behind the scenes.

== Role and duties ==
The role of the Portuguese president's spouse, be it "First Lady" or "First Gentleman", is not an official office and, as such, they are not given a salary or official duties. The first ladies have played a mere protocol role during official ceremonies and state visits. However, since 1996, under the presidency of Jorge Sampaio, the president's spouse has the right to a workplace and a three-people staff incorporated in the President's Office. In addition, according to the Portuguese State Protocol's order of precedence, the spouse of any high-ranking office holder is given the same rank as theirs, as long as the spouse is also invited to the ceremony.

With current president's spouse refusing to use the president's spouse workplace, the only two first ladies to have used it were Jorge Sampaio and Aníbal Cavaco Silva's wives: Maria José Ritta and Maria Cavaco Silva.

== List of first ladies of Portugal ==
=== First Portuguese Republic (1910–1926) ===
#	Portrait	Name (Lifespan)	Term of office		President
#	Portrait	Name (Lifespan)	Start	End	President
1		Lucrécia de Arriaga (1844–1927)	24 August 1911	26 May 1915	Manuel de Arriaga
–	Vacant		26 May 1915	5 October 1915	Teófilo Braga
2		Elzira Dantas Machado (1865–1942)	5 October 1915	5 December 1917	Bernardino Machado
3		Maria dos Prazeres Bessa Pais (1867–1945)	9 May 1918	14 December 1918	Sidónio Pais
4		Mariana do Canto e Castro (1866–1946)	16 December 1918	5 October 1919	João do Canto e Castro
5		Maria Joana Queiroga (1885–1965)	5 October 1919	5 October 1923	António José de Almeida
6		Belmira das Neves (1885–1967)	5 October 1923	11 December 1925	Manuel Teixeira Gomes
7		Elzira Dantas Machado (1865–1942)	11 December 1925	31 May 1926	Bernardino Machado

=== National Dictatorship / New State (1926–1974) ===
#	Portrait	Name (Lifespan)	Term of office		President
#	Portrait	Name (Lifespan)	Start	End	President
8		Maria das Dores Cabeçadas (1878–1949)	31 May 1926	17 June 1926	José Mendes Cabeçadas
9		Henriqueta Gomes da Costa (1863–1936)	29 June 1926	9 July 1926	Manuel Gomes da Costa
10		Maria do Carmo Carmona (1878–1956)	16 November 1926	18 April 1951	António Óscar Carmona
–	Vacant		18 April 1951	21 July 1951	António de Oliveira Salazar (interim)
11		Berta Craveiro Lopes (1899–1958)	21 July 1951	5 July 1958	Francisco Craveiro Lopes
–	Vacant		5 July 1958	9 August 1958	Francisco Craveiro Lopes
12		Gertrudes Rodrigues (1894–1991)	9 August 1958	25 April 1974	Américo Tomás

=== Third Portuguese Republic (1974–Present) ===
#	Portrait	Name (Lifespan)	Term of office		President
#	Portrait	Name (Lifespan)	Start	End	President
13		Maria Helena Spínola (1913–2002)	15 May 1974	30 September 1974	António de Spínola
14		Estela Costa Gomes (1927–2013)	30 September 1974	14 July 1976	Francisco da Costa Gomes
15		Manuela Ramalho Eanes (born 1938)	14 July 1976	9 March 1986	António Ramalho Eanes
16		Maria Barroso (1925–2015)	9 March 1986	9 March 1996	Mário Soares
17		Maria José Ritta (born 1941)	9 March 1996	9 March 2006	Jorge Sampaio
18		Maria Cavaco Silva (born 1937)	9 March 2006	9 March 2016	Aníbal Cavaco Silva
–	Vacant		9 March 2016	9 March 2026	Marcelo Rebelo de Sousa
19		Margarida Maldonado Freitas (born 1970)	9 March 2026	Incumbent	António José Seguro

== In popular culture ==
In 2005, an exhibit on the history of Portugal's first ladies, called Primeiras-Damas da Republica Portuguesa 1910-2005 (Portuguese First Ladies Exhibition 1910-2005), opened at the IADE Cultural Centre in Lisbon. The exhibition, which encompassed two entire floors of the IADE's cultural centre, included documents, clothing, gowns, jewelry, and letters once owned by Portugal's first ladies.

Items on display included former first lady Maria Helena de Barros Spinola's black evening gown and 1920s-era clothing, fans and furs worn by Maria das Dores Cabeçadas, the first lady in 1926. Pieces from Maria José Ritta, who was the first lady at the time of the 2005 exhibition, included a lemon yellow Dior-style suit worn during her employment at TAP Portugal during the 1970s, as well as clothing and dresses worn during state visits to Brazil and other nations.

In 2011, journalist Alberta Marques Fernandes published her book As Primeiras-Damas ("The First Ladies") about the wives of the presidents of the Third Portuguese Republic.

== See also ==
- President of Portugal
