= List of newspapers in Portugal =

Below is a list of newspapers published in Portugal.

== List ==
The number of national daily newspapers in Portugal was 32 in 1950, whereas it was 27 in 1965. (Note: Not all newspapers report their circulation numbers.)

Portuguese newspapers
Newspaper	Frequency	Est.	Headquarters	Circulation (Note: Digital+Printed.)	Owner	Website
National newspapers
A Bola	sports, daily	1945	Lisbon	—N/a	Ringier	abola.pt
Correio da Manhã	daily	1979	Lisbon	31,358	Medialivre	cmjornal.pt
Destak	daily, free	2001	Lisbon and Porto	—N/a	Medialivre	destak.pt
Diário de Notícias	daily	1864	Lisbon	—N/a	Global Media Group	dn.pt
Expresso	weekly	1973	Lisbon	82,196	Impresa (Sojornal)	expresso.pt
Jornal de Letras	cultural, biweekly	1981	Lisbon	—N/a	Impresa	jornaldeletras.pt
Jornal de Negócios	economics, daily	1998	Lisbon	9,308	Medialivre	jornaldenegocios.pt
Jornal de Notícias	daily	1888	Porto	16,602	Global Media Group	jn.pt
O Diabo	weekly	1977	Lisbon	—N/a	Pixeldecimal Unipessoal Lda.	jornaldiabo.com
O Jogo	sports, daily	1985	Porto	6,798	Global Media Group	ojogo.pt
O Jornal Económico	economics, weekly	2006	Lisbon	2,672	Luís Figueiredo	jornaleconomico.pt
Público	daily	1990	Lisbon and Porto	63,294	Sonae	publico.pt
Record	sports, daily	1948	Lisbon	20,406	Medialivre	record.pt
Sol	weekly	2006	Lisbon	—N/a	Media Capital	sol.pt
Tal & Qual	weekly	2021 (Note: Tabloid newspaper published between 1980 and 2007, but that returned in 2021.)	Lisbon	—N/a	Parem as Máquinas – Edições e Jornalismo	talequal.pt
The Portugal News	weekly	1977	Lagoa	244	Anglopress Edicões e Publicidade Lda.	theportugalnews.com
Vida Económica	economics, weekly	1933	Porto	1,941	Grupo Vida Económica	vidaeconomica.pt
Online newspapers
24Horas		2025	Lisbon	—N/a	José Paulo Fafe	24horas.pt
Eco	economics	2016	Lisbon	—N/a	Swipe News, SA.	eco.pt
Jornal do Centro		2016	Viseu	—N/a	Legenda Transparente, Lda.	jornaldocentro.pt
Notícias ao Minuto		2012	Lisbon	—N/a	New adVentures, Lda.	noticiasaominuto.com
Observador		2014	Lisbon	—N/a	Luís Amaral	observador.pt
O Minho		2015	Braga	—N/a	PDG5 Media, Lda.	ominho.pt
PT Jornal		2012	Porto	—N/a	Pedro Gonçalves	ptjornal.com
Lisbon Post		2026	Lisbon	—N/a	PRAGENCIA	lxpost.pt
The Portugal Post		2010	Malta	—N/a	PostMedia	theportugalpost.com
Regional newspapers
A Voz de Trás-os-Montes	weekly	1947	Vila Real	—N/a	Letras Dinâmicas, Lda.	avozdetrasosmontes.pt
Jornal do Algarve	weekly	1957	Vila Real de Santo António	—N/a	Viprensa Soc. Editora do Algarve Lda	jornaldoalgarve.pt
Açoriano Oriental	daily	1835	Ponta Delgada	—N/a	Açormédia, S.A.	acorianooriental.pt
Barlavento	weekly	1975	Portimão	—N/a	PORLAGMEDIA	barlavento.pt
Correio Alentejo	biweekly	2006	Castro Verde	—N/a		correioalentejo.com
Correio do Minho	daily	1926	Braga	—N/a	Arcada Nova	correiodominho.pt
Defesa de Espinho	weekly	1932	Espinho	—N/a	EMPES	defesadeespinho.pt
Diário As Beiras	daily	1986	Coimbra	—N/a	Sojormedia Beiras, SA	asbeiras.pt
Diário da Região	daily	2011	Setúbal	—N/a	Losango Mágico	diariodaregiao.pt
Diário de Aveiro	daily	1985	Aveiro	3,752	Diário de Aveiro, Lda.	diarioaveiro.pt
Diário de Coimbra	daily	1930	Coimbra	5,919	Diário de Aveiro, Lda.	diariocoimbra.pt
Diário de Leiria	daily	1988	Leiria	—N/a	Diário de Aveiro, Lda.	diarioleiria.pt
Diário de Notícias da Madeira	daily	1876	Funchal	6,292	Global Media Group	dnoticias.pt
Diário de Viseu	daily	1998	Viseu	—N/a	Diário de Aveiro, Lda.	diarioviseu.pt
Diário do Alentejo	weekly	1932	Beja	—N/a		diariodoalentejo.pt
Correio do Ribatejo	weekly	1892	Santarém	—N/a	Verdade das Palavras, Comunicação Social, Lda	correiodoribatejo.com
Diário do Minho	daily	1920	Braga	—N/a	Diário do Minho, Lda	diariodominho.pt
Diário do Sul	daily	1969	Évora	—N/a		diariodosul.com.pt
Diário dos Açores	daily	1870	Ponta Delgada	—N/a	Diário dos Açores, Lda.	diariodosacores.pt
Diário Insular	daily	1946	Angra do Heroísmo	—N/a	Sociedade Terceirense de Publicidade, Lda.	diarioinsular.pt
Jornal da Bairrada	weekly	1945	Oliveira do Bairro	—N/a	Jornal da Bairrada, Lda	jb.pt
Jornal da Madeira	daily	1932	Funchal	—N/a	Jornal da Madeira	jm-madeira.pt
Jornal de Leiria	weekly	1984	Leiria	—N/a	Jorlis-Edições e Publicações, Lda.	jornaldeleiria.pt
Jornal do Fundão	weekly	1946	Fundão	—N/a	Jornal do Fundão Editora, Lda.	jornaldofundao.pt
Linhas de Elvas	weekly	1950	Elvas	4,000	C.T.C.S., Lda.	nortealentejo.pt
Mais Guimarães	weekly	2013	Guimarães	—N/a	Grupo Mais Guimarães	maisguimaraes.pt
Mais/Semanário	weekly	2015	Póvoa de Varzim and Vila do Conde	—N/a		maissemanario.pt
O Comércio de Guimarães	weekly	1884	Guimarães	—N/a	Grupo Santiago	guimaraesdigital.com
O Mirante	weekly	1987	Santarém	—N/a	Impresa (Sojornal)	omirante.pt
O Ribatejo	weekly	1985	Santarém	—N/a		oribatejo.pt
O Setubalense	three times a week	1855	Setúbal	—N/a	Outra Margem - Publicações e Publicidade, Lda.	osetubalense.com
Reconquista	weekly	1945	Castelo Branco	—N/a	Fábrica da Igreja da Paróquia de São Miguel da Sé de Castelo Branco	reconquista.pt
Região de Leiria	weekly	1935	Leiria	—N/a	Região de Leiria. Lda.	regiaodeleiria.pt
Região Sul	weekly	1993	Loulé	—N/a	Navega Aqui - Publicações, Lda.	regiao-sul.pt
Opinião Pública	weekly	1991	Vila Nova de Famalicão	15,000	Editave Multimedia, Lda.	opiniao-publica.pt

=== Political newspapers ===
- Avante!, published by the Portuguese Communist Party
- Esquerda Socialista
- Liberdade
- Portugal Socialista, published by the Socialist Party
- Povo Livre, published by the Social Democratic Party

== Defunct newspapers ==
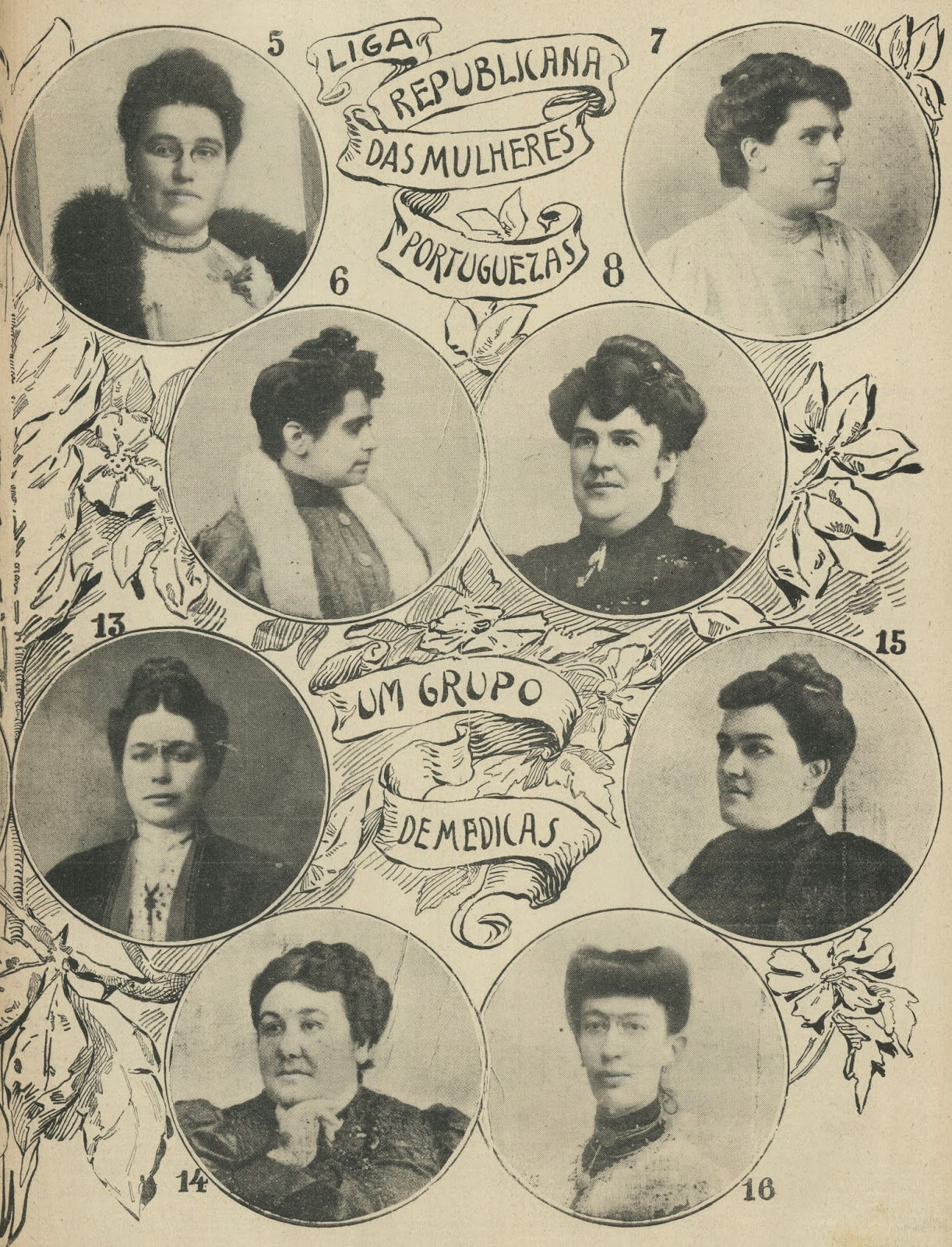
Supplement to the newspaper O Século about the suffragettes of the Liga Republicana das Mulheres Portuguesas, published on May 12, 1910: 5 - Ana de Castro Osório; 6 - Maria Veleda; 7 - Beatriz Pinheiro; 8 - Maria Clara Correia Alve; 13 - Sofia Quintino; 14 - Adelaide Cabete; 15 - Carolina Beatriz Ângelo; 16 - Maria do Carmo Joaquina Lopes.

- 24 Horas, Lisbon (tabloid)
- A Capital, Lisbon (1968–2005)
- Anglo-Portuguese News, Lisbon (1937–2004)
- Combate, (1974–1978)
- Comércio do Porto, Porto (1854–2005)
- Diário Digital, Lisbon (1999–2017)
- Diário Económico (1989-2016)
- Diário da Manhã, Lisbon (1931–1971)
- Diário Popular, Lisbon (1943–1991)
- Global Notícias (daily, free) (2007-2010)
- Metro, (2004-2016)
- Notícias de Évora, Évora (1900-1992)
- Notícias de Tarde, (1981-1984)
- O Independente, Lisbon (1988–2006)
- O Século, Lisbon (1880–1978)
- Semanário Económico, Lisbon (folded 2009)
- Novo Lisbon and Porto (2021–2024)
- i Lisbon (2009–2025)

== See also ==
- List of digitized titles in the Lisbon Hemeroteca Municipal
- Mass media in Portugal
- List of magazines in Portugal
- List of radio stations in Portugal
- Television in Portugal

== Bibliography ==
in English

- Joaquim Antonio de Macedo (1874), "The Press", Guide to Lisbon and its Environs, London: Simpkin, Marshall & Co.
- British Museum (1885), "Lisbon", Periodical Publications, Catalogue of Printed Books, London
- "Portugal: Directory: the Press". Europa World Year Book 2004. Europa Publications. 2004. ISBN 1857432533.
- Manuel Pinto; Helena Sousa (2004). "Portugal". In Euromedia Research Group; Mary Kelly; et al. (eds.). Media in Europe (3rd ed.). SAGE Publications. pp. 180–190. ISBN 978-0-7619-4132-3.
- Douglas L. Wheeler; Walter C. Opello Jr. (2010). "Media". Historical Dictionary of Portugal (3rd ed.). Scarecrow Press. ISBN 978-0-8108-7075-8.
- "Portugal", Freedom of the Press, US: Freedom House, 2015, OCLC 57509361

in Portuguese

- Carlos Augusto da Silva Campos, ed. (1886), "Jornaes de Lisboa, Provincias e Ilhas", Almanach Commercial de Lisboa (in Portuguese), pp. 437–441
- Augusto Xavier da Silva Pereira (1895). O jornalismo portuguez (in Portuguese). Typographia Soares.
- Warren Agee and Nelson Traquina (1983). O Quarto Poder Frustrado [Mass Media in the Post-Revolutionary Portugal] (in Portuguese). Lisbon: Vega.
- Gina Guedes Rafael; Manuela Santos, eds. (2001). Jornais e Revistas Portugueses do Século XIX (in Portuguese). Biblioteca Nacional. ISBN 972-565-229-0.
