= Angélica Viana Porto =

Portuguese feminist and pacifist (1881–1938)

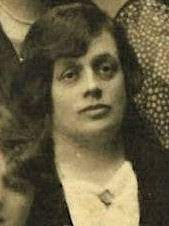
- Born: Angélica Cristina Irene Lopes Viana; 10 November 1881; Paço de Arcos, Lisbon District, Portugal
- Died: 21 May 1938 (aged 56); Lisbon, Portugal
- Occupation: Activist
- Known for: Feminist; Opponent of authoritarian Estado Novo Government; Pacifist

Angélica Viana Porto (1881 – 1938) was a Portuguese feminist, republican, pacifist and anti-dictatorship activist, recognized for her role during the first wave of the feminist movement in Portugal. She was active initially in the Liga das Mulheres Republicanas (Republican Women's League) and then in the Conselho Nacional das Mulheres Portuguesas (National Council of Portuguese Women), where she served as vice-president and honorary president.

== Early life ==
Born on November 10, 1881, in Paço de Arcos, in the municipality of Oeiras to the west of the Portuguese capital, Lisbon, Angélica Cristina Irene Lopes Viana was the daughter of Augusto Gomes Viana, a customs officer, and Emília das Dores Lopes Viana, both from Lisbon. She was baptised on 25 February 1882 in Oeiras. She married Agostinho Santos Porto, a native of the city of Porto, who died in 1913.

== Activism ==
In 1907, Viana Porto led a committee, alongside Ilda Jorge, Maria Veleda and Ana de Castro Osório, which sought to develop a nursery school in Lisbon for poor children between three and six years of age. A year later, as a member of the Republican Women's League (LRMP), she actively participated in protest actions, petitions, and conferences of the republican women's and feminist movements, demanding the right to vote for women, improvements to the divorce law, access to education and to professions prohibited to women, equal pay for men and women, and legal equality within couples. Later, between 1914 and 1918, during the First Portuguese Republic, she campaigned to attract new members and donations, and held various leadership positions in the LRMP, signing the petition addressed to the government of Sidónio Pais, which appealed once again for the right to vote for women. In 1917 she became the director of the LRMP journal, A Madrugada, alongside Filipa de Oliveira and Luísa de Almeida.

In 1919, joining the National Council of Portuguese Women (CNMP), which had been founded in 1914 by Adelaide Cabete, Viana Porto collaborated in production of the magazine Alma feminina, the movement's official press organ, then directed by Maria Clara Correia Alves and later by Cabete and Elina Guimarães. Within the CNMP, she would also hold the positions of secretary of the interior (1920), vice-president of the Board (1929, 1931–1934, 1936), honorary president (1937) and president of the moral committee (1922 -1929, 1931–1934, 1936). As a speaker, she participated in the First and Second Feminist and Education Congresses, organized by the CNMP in Lisbon, where she presented papers on "Assisting delinquents" (1924), "Report of the Moral Section of the National Council of Portuguese Women" (1926), "The moral action of work" (1928) and "Increasing the value of female work" (1929).

Viana Porto also supported other initiatives that had pacifist ideals, speaking at a meeting promoted in 1927 by the CNMP's Peace Section. She also wrote a thesis to be presented at the First National Abolitionist Congress (1926) and spoke at the Second National Abolitionist Congress (1929), both organized by the Portuguese Abolitionist League, which opposed prostitution and aimed, in particular, to repeal legislation that required prostitutes to register and have regular medicals. During that same period, she campaigned for donations for various charitable actions and for the acquisition of an airplane for Maria de Lourdes Sá Teixeira, who was Portugal's first woman pilot but could not afford to buy her own plane.

In 1927, Viana Porto was honoured in Alma Feminina with articles about her by Cabete, Arnaldo Brazão, a leading abolitionist, Beatriz Texeira de Magalhães, Fábia Ochôa Arez, Maria O'Neill and Bárbara Rosa de Carvalho Pereira. In 1928, she joined the campaign of O Rebate, the organ of the Portuguese Republican Party, which criticized the actions of the Estado Novo dictatorship, calling for an end to the recently created wave of repression and political persecution. She also wrote for other publications, such as O Mundo, Civilização, Educação (organ of the Portuguese Educational Union), and Educação Social.

== Death ==
Viana Porto died on 21 May 1938 in Lisbon, a victim of epilepsy. She was buried in the Alto de São João Cemetery in Lisbon.
