= Conselho Nacional das Mulheres Portuguesas =

Portuguese feminist organization

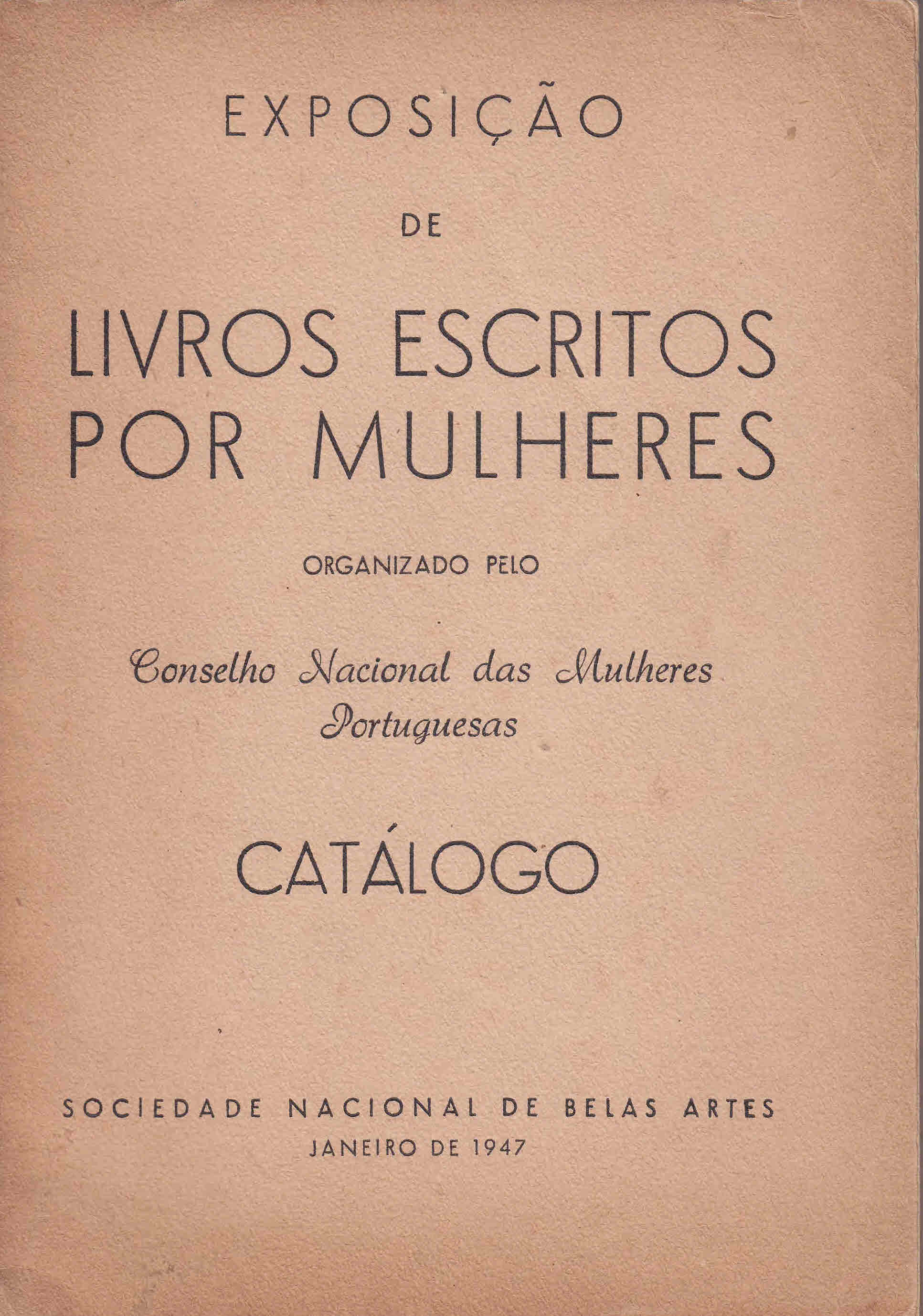
Catalogue of the Exhibition of Books Written by Women, held in 1947

The Conselho Nacional das Mulheres Portuguesas (National Council of Portuguese Women) was a feminist organization founded in 1914.

== Early developments ==
The first attempt to found a Women’s Council in Portugal was at the beginning of the 20th century, when Carolina Michaëlis de Vasconcelos endeavoured to "bring together some ladies who speak English - and who wish to collaborate in the feminist movement" in order to meet a visiting Canadian feminist, Sophia Sanford. The idea was to try to form a National Council of Portuguese women, but the meeting was unsuccessful. Subsequently, the Conselho Nacional das Mulheres Portuguesas (CNMP) was founded on 30 May 1914, at the initiative of the politician and writer, Magalhães Lima, and the activist and gynecologist Adelaide Cabete, who was appointed president. Carolina Michaëlis de Vasconcelos was invited to be honorary president.

== Aims of the Council ==
The official bulletin of the Council, published in November 1914, stated that it aimed "to bring together, in a large association, all the associations and female groups that are spread throughout the country", putting an end to "alienation from the international feminist world". Its main objectives were the improvement of the legal situation of women in the family and in the State; the right to votes for women; the end of trafficking and exploitation of women; the improvement of public health; the defence of the rights of pregnant women and women who had recently given birth; and the protection of disadvantaged and abused women and children. Despite the Council’s apolitical approach, the fact that several prominent members of the Republican League of Portuguese Women, which advocated the overthrow of the monarchy, were part of the CNMP prevented the participation of more conservative, and, in general, more affluent women. As a consequence, the organization was short of funds and its headquarters, for most of its existence, were in the doctor’s office of Adelaide Cabete and her sister, Maria Brazão in Lisbon. However, in 1914 and 1915, there were fifteen affiliated associations.

== Activities ==
To celebrate the tenth anniversary of its foundation, the Council organized the First Feminist and Education Congress in Lisbon in May 1924, which was inaugurated by the President of the Republic, Manuel Teixeira Gomes. Twenty-five papers were presented, 17 by women. The proposals made in the presentations were very advanced for the time, such as that the working woman should be entitled to a month of maternity leave; sex education should be given in schools; equal pay should be given for equal positions; women should have the vote; and that married women and men should have the same legal status. In the following year representatives of the Council spoke at several international conferences. The successful first Lisbon congress led to the decision to hold another in 1928, which discussed issues such as coeducation in primary schools, votes for women, and the need to ensure that a woman who became pregnant would not be sacked.

Throughout its life the Council communicated with its members through a bulletin. Initially known simply as the Bulletin of the Portuguese Women’s National Council, its name was changed to Alma feminina (The Feminine Soul) in 1917. It was changed again to A Mulher (The Woman) in 1946. The magazine was mainly concerned with publicizing the association's activities and initiatives promoted by international feminist and female organizations, as well as informing readers about the situation of women and the state of feminism in other countries.

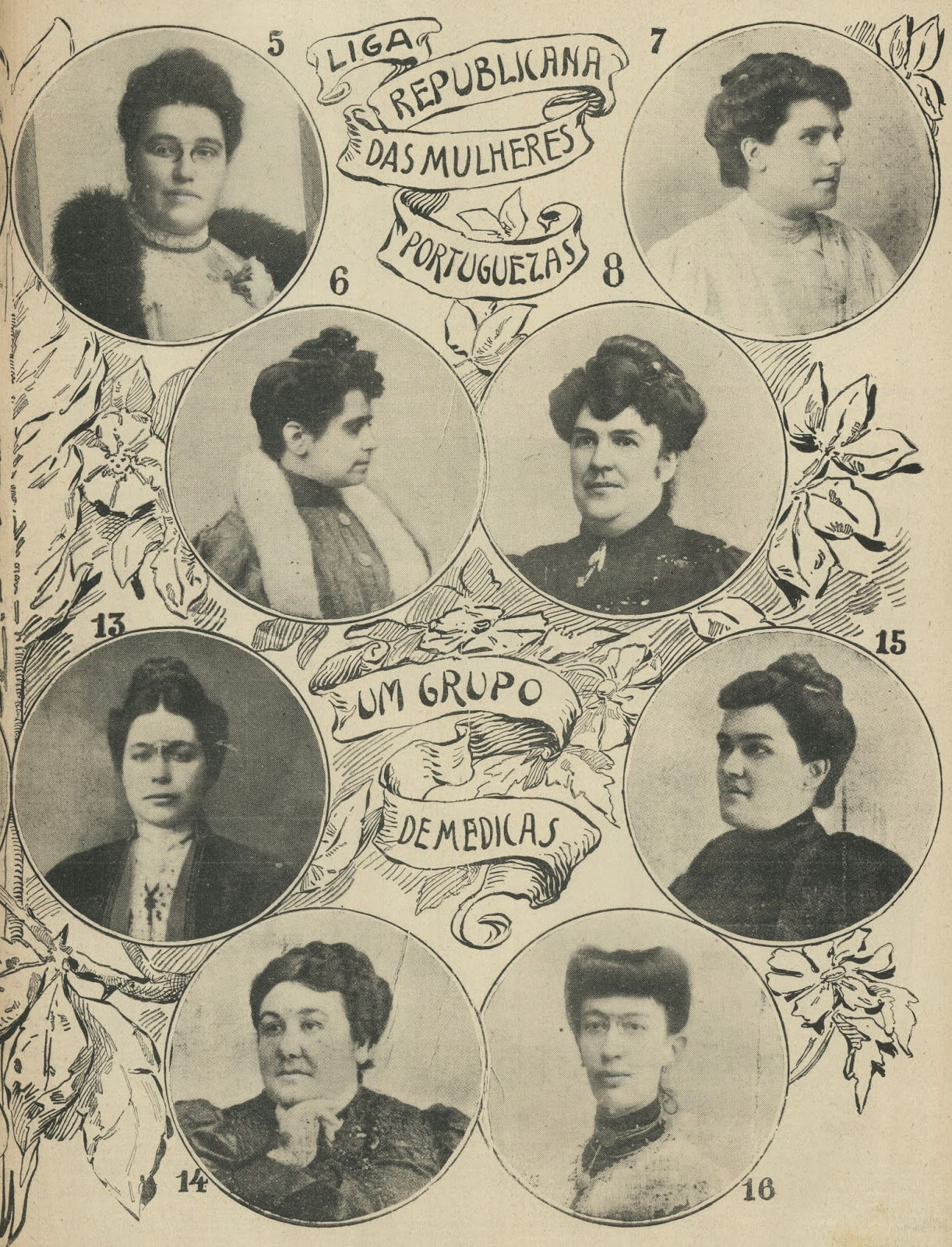
Supplement to the newspaper O Século about the suffragettes of the Liga das Mulheres Republicanas, published on May 12, 1910: 5 - Ana de Castro Osório; 6 - Maria Veleda; 7 - Beatriz Pinheiro; 8 - Maria Clara Correia Alves; 13 - Sofia Quintino; 14 - Adelaide Cabete; 15 - Carolina Beatriz Ângelo; 16 - Maria do Carmo Joaquina Lopes.

In 1930, on the initiative of journalist Maria Lamas, the council organised an "Exhibition of Female Work, ancient and modern, of a literary, artistic and scientific nature", with the support of the newspaper O Século. The purpose of the exhibition was to give visibility to the work of women from all over the country. Its success raised the profile of the CNMP. However, during the 1930s and 1940s, with the emergence of women's associations associated with the authoritarian Estado Novo government, the Council faced challenges as the State wanted women’s organizations that it could control.

== Closure ==
Although Adelaide Cabete lived in Portuguese Angola from 1929 to 1934, she continued to serve as president. On Cabete’s death in 1935 Sara Beirão was elected president. She was followed by Isabel Cohen von Bonhorst in 1942, and Maria Lamas in 1945. In 1947, after holding the successful "Exhibition of Books Written by Women" at the National Society of Fine Arts (Sociedade Nacional de Belas Artes - SNBA) in Lisbon, the Conselho Nacional das Mulheres Portuguesas was banned by the Estado Novo and had to immediately cease its operations. Nevertheless, many of the Council's members continued to work to promote the rights of and better living conditions for Portuguese women, joining other associations that had not been banned.

== List of Prominent Members ==
- Abigail de Paiva Cruz - painter, sculptor and lace artist, president of the Art Commission in 1938;
- Adelaide Cabete - obstetrician, gynecologist and teacher, chair of the CNMP board (1914-1935), chair of the Journalistic Commission (1920-1921), Press (1922-1929; 1931; 1933-1934), Peace (1927) and Hygiene (1924) Commissions. Speaker at the First and Second Feminist and Education Congress, author of the theses "The anti-alcoholic struggle in schools", "Protection of pregnant women and children", "Role that the study of childcare, feminine hygiene, the teaching of primary care in the event of accidents and maternal pedagogy must play in home education"(1924), and "The teaching of childcare in children's schools"(1928);
- Albertina Gamboa - professor, president of the Fiscal Council (1920, 1928-1929), and of the Propaganda Commission (1922-1923, 1925) and Education (1920), speaker at the First Women and Education Congress, author of the theses "The woman as an educator"(1924) and "Pornography"(1926);
- Angélica Viana Porto - vice president of the CNMP board (1929; 1931-1936), honorary president (1937), president of the Moral Commission (1922-1929; 1931-1934; 1936), speaker at the First and Second Congresses on Women and Education, and author of the theses "Assistance to delinquents" (1924), "Memory of the Moral Section of the National Council of Portuguese Women" (1926), "The moral action of work" (1928) and "The value of women's work"(1929);
- Aurora Teixeira de Castro - lawyer, notary and publicist, vice president of the CNMP board (1926-1927), president of the Emigration Commission (1922), Legislation (1922,1924-1925) and Suffrage (1927). Speaker in the First and Second Women and Education Congress and author of the theses "Political claims of Portuguese women", "Situation of married women in the matrimonial relations of the couple's assets" (1924), "Legal ages of women" (1926) and "Feminist claims" (1928);
- Bárbara Rosa de Carvalho Pereira, secretary of the interior - archive section (1923), assistant treasurer of the board (1927) and treasurer of the provinces (1928, 1929, 1931-1934, 1936-1945), president of the Charity Commission (1925, 1926) and the Finance Section (1931-1934);
- Beatriz Arnut, writer and poet, president of the Peace Commission (1937) and Moral Commission (1938);
- Beatriz Teixeira de Magalhães - primary school teacher, secretary of the minutes (1927-1929, 1931-1934), president of the Education Commission (1933-1934), speaker at the Second Feminist and Education Congress, author of the thesis "Children's Readings and Libraries" (1928);
- Berta Santos Garção, vice-president (1928), chair of the board of the General Assembly (1926-1927);
- Branca de Gonta Colaço - writer and poet, president of the Art Commission (1936-1937) and Peace Commission (1928-1929, 1931-1934);
- Carmen Marques - lawyer and writer, author of the theses "Manual work and intellectual work", "The Church and civil marriage", "Crisis of common sense, crisis of the legal spirit" and "Democracy and Feminism" (1930);
- Carolina Michaëlis de Vasconcelos - writer and teacher, honorary president (1914);
- Deolinda Lopes Vieira - professor, president of the Education Commission (1922-1926) and Early Childhood Education (1927-1929), speaker at the First Women and Education Congress and author of the theses "The education of abnormals" (1924) and "Unique school" (1928);
- Domingas Lazary Amaral - professor, speaker at the First Women and Education Congress and author of the thesis “Education of indigenous people in the colonies and their advantages” (1924);
- Eduarda Lapa, painter, president of the Art Commission (1939);
- Elina Guimarães - lawyer, vice president of the CNMP board (1928-1929, 1931), chair of the Legal Commission (1938-1944; 1946-1947), Suffrage (1928-1929, 1931), Propaganda (1943-1944) and Legislation (1926-1928; 1932-1934). Director of the magazine Alma Feminina (1929-1930), speaker at the Second Women and Education Congress, author of the theses "Protection of working women" and "The situation of professional women in marriage"(1928);
- Fábia Ochôa Arez - professor, member of the board (1921, 1928, 1929), president of the Suffrage Commission (1922-1924) and Paz (1925);
- Isabel Cohen von Bonhorst, vice-chair of the CNMP board (1937-1941), chair of the board (1942–44) 1938), chair of the board of the General Assembly (1946) and chair of the Peace Commission (1936, 1938);
- Júlia Antunes Franco - professor, speaker at the Second Women and Education Congress and author of the thesis “Women as a social value” (1928);
- Julieta Ribeiro de Carvalho, speaker at the First Women and Education Congress and author of the thesis "A naturist woman" (1924);
- Laura de Castro Corte-Real, lawyer, president of the Emigration Commission (1927) and Legislation (1923), secretary of the interior - correspondence section (1923), speaker at the First Women and Education Congress;
- Leontina de Cabral Hogan - medium and spiritualist, president of the Literature Commission (1942);
- Manuela Cesarina Sena Porto - translator, writer, journalist and actress, vice president of the CNMP board (1946);
- Maria Amélia Teixeira - poet and director of the magazine Portugal Feminino, president of the Art Commission (1932);
- Maria Clara Correia Alves, secretary-general (1914, 1919), vice-president (1921), director of the Official Bulletin of the National Council of Portuguese Women (1914-1916) and of the magazine Alma Feminina (1917-1919), president of the Journalistic Commission (1917-1919);
- Maria da Luz Albuquerque - journalist, president of the Propaganda Commission (1940-1942) and Education (1943-1945), organizer of the Santa Maria da Feira nucleus;
- Maria da Luz Pereira e Silva, vice-president (1921-1923, 1925);
- Maria Emília Baptista Ferreira, vice-president (1917, 1922-1923) and chair of the Board of the General Assembly (1920);
- Maria Ermelinda de Stuart Gomes - writer and teacher, president of the Education Commission (1936);
- Maria Lúcia Vassalo Namorado - writer, president of the Propaganda Commission (1945);
- Maria Lamas, chair of the CNMP board (1945-1947), chair of the Education Commission (1937), Art (1943-1944) and Literature (1939-1941; 1943);
- Maria O'Neill - writer, chair of the Social Assistance Commission (1922-1923; 1925-1929; 1931-1932), Labour (1924) and the Leagues of Kindness (1924), speaker at the First and Second Women and Education Congress, and author of the theses "Assistance and work", "The leagues of goodness" (1924) and "The vote for women" (1928);
- Mariana da Assunção da Silva - professor, member of the board (1925-1926, 1928-1929), president of the Charity Commission (1927), and General Treasurer (1931-1945);
- Regina Quintanilha - first lawyer to practice in Portugal and speaker at the First Women and Education Congress (1924);
- Sara Beirão, chair of the board of the General Assembly (1929-1930), vice-chair of the CNMP board (1931-1934, 1943-1945), chair of the CNMP board (1935-1942), honorary chair (1942), president of the Suffrage Commission (1926, 1932-1934), speaker at the Second Female and Education Congress and author of the thesis "The Portuguese woman in commerce" (1928);
- Sara Benoliel - doctor and first pediatrician to practice in Portugal;
- Vitória Pais Freire de Andrade - professor, chair of the board of the General Assembly (1923, 1925), chair of the Propaganda Committee (1926), Peace (1922), Suffrage (1925), speaker at the First Women and Education Congress and author of the thesis "The influence of public performances on education" (1924).

== See also ==
- Liga Portuguesa Abolicionista
