= Mariana Osório de Castro =

Portuguese feminist

- Born: Mariana Adelaide Osório Cabral de Alburquerque Moor Quintins; 15 June 1842; Lisbon, Portugal
- Died: 17 November 1917 (aged 75); Lisbon
- Known for: Feminist and republican activist; mother of Ana de Castro Osório

Mariana Adelaide Osório de Castro Cabral de Alburquerque Moor Quintins (1842 – 1917) was a Portuguese feminist. She was the mother of Ana de Castro Osório who became one of the leading figures in the first wave of feminism in Portugal.

== Early life ==
Mariana Osório de Castro was born in São Jorge de Arroios, Lisbon on 15 June 1842. She was the daughter of José Osório Cabral de Alburquerque, lieutenant-general and governor of the Portuguese colony of Macau, and of Ana Doroteia Rosa Moor Kintins, a Dutch national. She married João Baptista de Castro, a renowned bibliophile, notary and magistrate, in Fundão, Portugal in 1866, with whom she had four children: the writer and suffragist Ana de Castro Osório (1872 – 1925), the judge and poet Alberto Osório de Castro (1868 – 1946), the judge and writer João Osório de Castro (1869 – 1939), and the commander and president of the League of Combatants of the Great War, Jerónimo Osório de Castro (1871 – 1935).

== Later life ==
After getting married, Mariana Osório de Castro lived for 22 years in Mangualde in Portugal's Viseu District, where her husband was then a property registry officer. The family then moved to Setúbal. In 1911 they moved to the capital, Lisbon as her husband had been appointed as a judge there. In that year he approved the right to vote of Carolina Beatriz Ângelo, the first Portuguese woman to vote, on the grounds that the law only required voters to be “head of the household”. After that, the law was speedily changed to specify that they had to be a “male” head of household. In Lisbon, Osório de Castro's residence became known as a centre of political and social activities because of the activities of her daughter, who had become one of the most respected and influential figures of the First Portuguese Republic and the first wave of feminism in Portugal.

Supporting her daughter's initiatives, Mariana Osório de Castro became a member of the Liga das Mulheres Republicanas (Republican Women's League), which was formed by her daughter and Adelaide Cabete in 1908, and in 1911 of the Associação de Propaganda Feminista (APF), founded by her daughter after she split from the League because of policy differences. Osório de Castro played a prominent role in the management of the Association and contributed to the promotion of its ideas, particularly after the death of Carolina Beatriz Ângelo and during the period in which her daughter and Elzira Dantas Machado travelled to Brazil. She was elected president of the APF in 1912, chosen from among the founding members.

In 1915, she became a shareholder in the Feminist Propaganda and Women's Rights Defence Company, which published the newspaper, A Semeadora (1915–1918). In the same year, she joined the Women's Commission "For the Fatherland", and worked to collect clothing and supplies for Portuguese soldiers deployed during the First World War. In 1916, she was elected a member of the supervisory board. During the same period, she joined the Maternal Work initiative, managed by Inês da Conceição Conde and Maria Veleda, which aimed to rescue children from the streets. She also became a member of the Portuguese Women's Crusade, which provided moral and material assistance to those suffering as a result of enforced conscription during the War.

== Death ==
Mariana Osório de Castro died on 17 November 1917, at the age of 75. At her funeral, the eulogy was given by Maria Benedita Mouzinho de Albuquerque de Faria Pinho, with whom she had collaborated on the steering committee of the magazine A Mulher e a Criança, between in 1909 and 1910.
