= Adelina da Glória Berger =

Portuguese feminist activist (1865–1922)

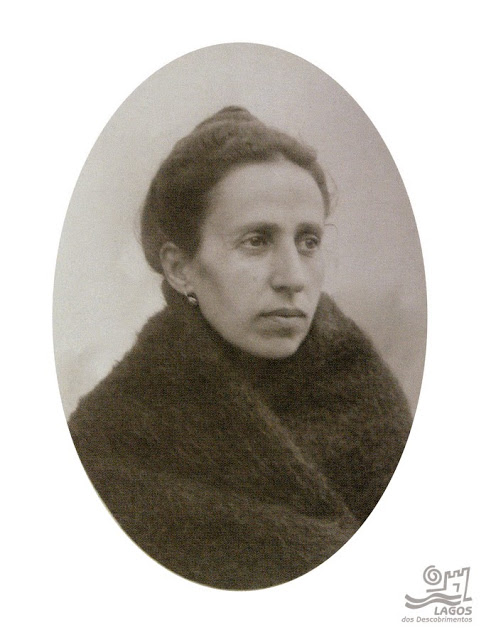
- Born: 28 March 1865; Lagos, Algarve, Portugal
- Died: 29 July 1922 (aged 57); Lisbon, Portugal
- Occupation: Activist

Adelina da Glória Berger (28 March 1865 – 29 July 1922) was a prominent Portuguese feminist and republican activist. She is best known for her pioneering role in advancing women's rights in Portugal during the early 20th century, particularly through her leadership in feminist organizations and advocacy for gender equality.

== Early life ==
Adelina da Glória Paletti Berger was born on March 28, 1865, in São Sebastião, Lagos, Portugal. She was the daughter of Belchior da Costa Paletti, a scribe, and Ana Vitória Marim Paletti. Her family had modest yet respected roots in the Algarve region. Her paternal grandfather, Giovanni Francesco da Costa Paletti, was an Italian orchestra conductor from Mantua, Lombardy.

== Activism and feminism ==
Adelina's feminist activism began in earnest in 1909 when she organized the inaugural meeting of the Liga das Mulheres Republicanas (Republican Women's League) in Lagos. This organization aimed to empower women and advocate for their social and political rights. Adelina was elected president of the league after its founding.

Her activism extended to humanitarian efforts such as organizing donations for victims of the 1909 Benavente earthquake. She also protested the execution of Spanish educator Francisco Ferrer and supported progressive political figures like Afonso Costa and Miguel Bombarda.

After the establishment of the Portuguese Republic in 1910, Adelina moved to Lisbon to intensify her activism. She worked closely with Ana de Castro Osório in feminist associations and aligned herself with radical feminists like Maria Veleda. Adelina championed causes such as universal suffrage, equal pay for women, access to education, and anti-clericalism.

== Legacy ==
Adelina's contributions to feminism were formally recognized posthumously. In 1995, the municipality of Lagos named a street after her in the São Sebastião da Pedreira parish. The street plaque was unveiled during a ceremony on International Women's Day in 1996.
