= Virgínia da Fonseca =

Portuguese activist (1875–1962)

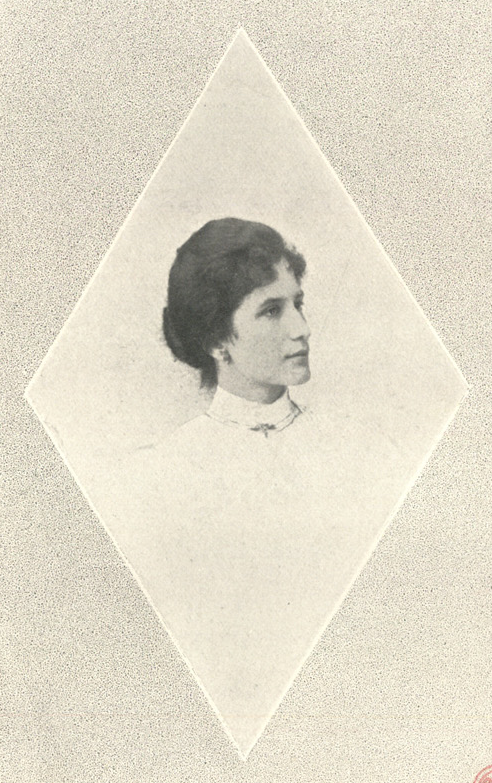
- Born: Maria Virgínia Teixeira de Sousa Adão da Fonseca; 14 October 1875; Angra do Heroísmo, Açores, Portugal
- Died: 21 March 1962 (aged 86); Lisbon, Portugal
- Occupations: Activist, writer, translator, painter

Maria Virgínia Teixeira de Sousa Adão da Fonseca (14 October 1875 – 21 March 1962) was a Portuguese activist, writer, translator, illustrator, painter. She was an active member of the Portuguese Republican Party.

== Career ==
She became involved in prestigious artistic circles, participating in exhibitions alongside renowned Portuguese painters and sculptors such as José Malhoa, Alfredo Roque Gameiro, António Teixeira Lopes, José Joaquim Teixeira Lopes, Fanny Munró, José Veloso Salgado, Maria Augusta e Columbano Bordalo Pinheiro. She continued to exhibit her work and contributed illustrations to various publications, notably creating covers for the literary works of her husband Faustino da Fonseca.

In literature, she translated works by notable authors and worked as an art critic. She founded and directed the magazine Moda Ilustrada (Illustrated Fashion), one of the first feminist publications in Portugal.

== Activism and feminism ==
Da Fonseca was active in the Portuguese Republican movement in the early 1900s, a period that saw the transition from monarchy to republic in Portugal. Her involvement in the Republican cause is evidenced by her inclusion in the Album Republicano (Republican Album), a publication from 1908 that featured prominent figures of the Republican movement.

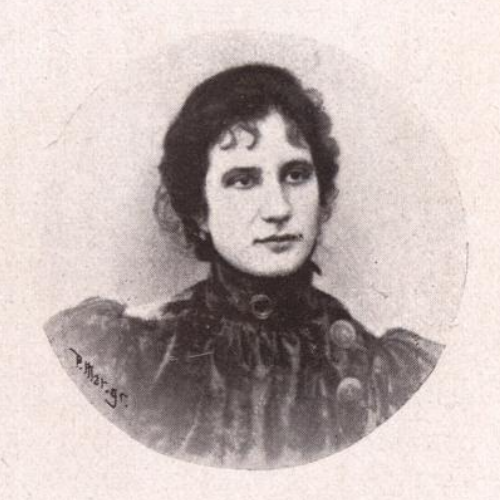
Virgínia da Fonseca in the Álbum Açoriano (Album of Azores).

As a Republican and feminist, da Fonseca joined the Republican League of Portuguese Women (LRMP) and actively campaigned for women's rights. She was part of a group that advocated for women's suffrage and participated in various feminist actions and petitions. She co-signed a message to José Relvas, commending him for allowing women to hold state jobs. In 1911, alongside notable feminists like Carolina Beatriz Ângelo and Ana de Castro Osório, she presented demands to the president Teófilo Braga, urging the inclusion of voting rights for economically independent women in the new Portuguese Constitution being drafted at the time.
