= Maria de Lourdes Sá Teixeira =

First Portuguese woman to hold a pilot's licence

- Born: 19 October 1907
- Died: 19 July 1984 (aged 76)
- Known for: First woman to hold a Portuguese pilot’s licence

Maria de Lourdes Braga de Sá Teixeira (19 October 1907 - 19 July 1984) was a Portuguese aviator, being the first woman to obtain a pilot’s licence in Portugal, at the age of twenty-one.

== Early life and education ==
Born into an upper-middle-class family, and known by family and friends as “Milú”, Sá Teixeira was the daughter of Afonso Henriques Botelho de Sá Teixeira, a medical colonel. He was vehemently opposed to his daughter’s wish to fly a plane. Faced with the weakening of his daughter's health due to his opposition, he changed his mind and allowed her to continue with her plans and from that moment he gave her full support. Her instructor was Francisco Craveiro Lopes who went on to become the 12th President of the Portuguese Republic between 1951 and 1958. It is said that, impressed by the determination of Sá Teixeira to succeed, instructor Lopes made every effort to ensure that she became qualified.

== Flying career ==
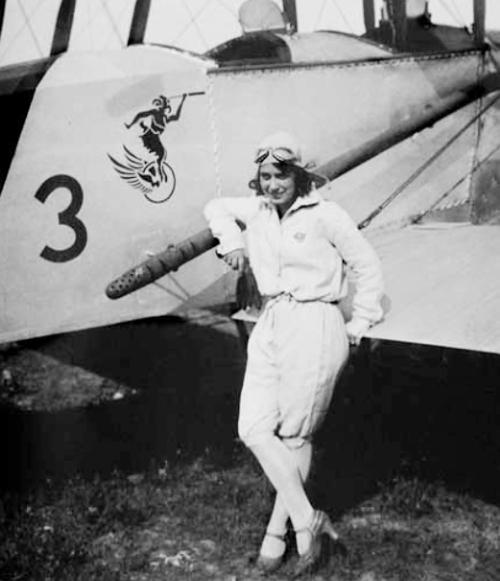
Sá Texeira next to an Avro 548

On completion of her training, she obtained her pilot's license on 6 December 1928, flying a single-engined Caudron G.3 biplane, at the Escola Militar de Aeronáutica situated near Sintra. For the final exams she flew in the presence of her father and of Carlos Bleck who, three years earlier, had been the first non-military pilot to be awarded a licence in Portugal. Bleck was representing the Aero-Club de Portugal, which had been founded in 1909. The Civil Governor of Lisbon and several Air Force officers were also present on the occasion.

Sá Teixeira was formally awarded her wings at the Ninth Annual Meeting of the Aero-Club de Portugal. Her determination to achieve her goal drew her to the attention of the National Council of Portuguese Women (CNMP), which advocated for equal rights for women. Recognising that Sá Teixeira, although from a fairly wealthy family, did not have the resources to purchase her own plane, the founder and Chairperson of the CNMP, Adelaide Cabete, formed a committee to organise a fundraising campaign to purchase a de Havilland plane for Sá Teixeira’s use. Members of the committee included the writer and feminist, Maria O'Neill. Considerable publicity for the venture was achieved, both inside and outside Portugal, and Sá Teixeira became a focal point for the women’s movement, but the donations proved insufficient for purchase of a plane. Public reaction to her achievement is said to have resulted in a positive step forward in the promotion of equality between men and women in Portugal.

For almost two decades, Sá Teixeira was the only woman in Portugal authorized to fly a plane. It took another 19 years for Maria Ghira to officially obtain the wings of a civilian pilot. Only in 1994 did Paula Costa become the first woman to fly for the Portuguese Air Force.

== Later life ==
Maria de Lourdes Braga de Sá Teixeira flew relatively little after qualifying. She died at the age of 76, on 19 July 1984. To celebrate the 85th anniversary of her qualification the Lisbon City Council named a garden after her in the parish of Olivais (Jardim Maria de Lourdes Sá Teixeira) just to the east of Lisbon’s airport.
