= Abigail de Paiva Cruz =

Portuguese sculptor, feminist (1883–1944)

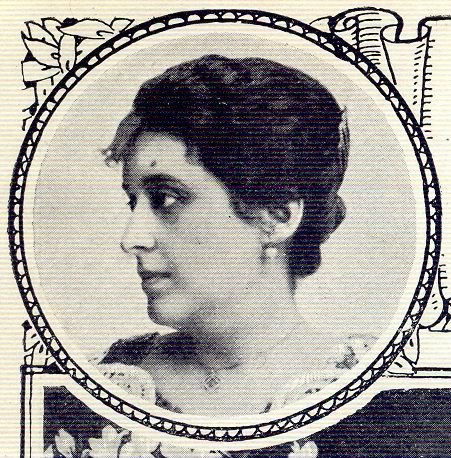
- Born: 28 April 1883; Porto, Portugal
- Died: 8 October 1944 (aged 61); Lisbon, Portugal
- Occupation: Artist
- Known for: Support to artistic education of women

Abigail de Paiva Cruz (1883 - 1944) was a Portuguese naturalist painter, sculptor, lace maker and feminist activist.

== Early life ==
Abigail de Paiva Cruz was born in the parish of Cedofeita in the Portuguese city of Porto, on 28 April 1883. She was the daughter of Albino José da Cruz and Teresa de Castro e Paiva Cruz, who were both from progressive, affluent families. Her father died when she was just 4 years old but her mother was able to provide her with an education at a time when the teaching of women was not encouraged. She had two brothers, one of whom died at the age of two months.

== Studies ==
Paiva Cruz joined the Porto Academy of Fine Arts, becoming a student of the painter João Marques de Oliveira and sculptor António Teixeira Lopes. She then studied in Paris, meeting, among others, the writer and poet Alphonse Métérié, with whom he maintained a long friendship by correspondence. In 1910 she began to expand her portfolio and experiment with new media, including through the art of embroidery and lace, which stood out because of her use of Portuguese motifs.

== Exhibitions ==
With the threat of World War I in France, Paiva Cruz returned to Portugal. In March 1914 she held her first solo exhibition at the Crystal Palace in Porto, presenting 44 paintings. In the following years, he held several exhibitions in Lisbon, including at Salão Bobone where the proceeds from the sales of her works were given to the Portuguese Women's Crusade, a feminist charity that supported those suffering from the consequences of the war. The exhibition was widely reported.

== Feminism ==
Taking advantage of her success, in 1931, Paiva Cruz opened a lace school in Lisbon, with the aim of supporting not only the more traditional arts, but also providing women with instruction in crafts to create an opportunity for them to earn a livelihood and financial independence. As a result of this initiative, she was invited by Portugal Feminino magazine to create on its pages a course on different types of lace work. That same year, together with the painter, Emília dos Santos Braga, she joined the Conselho Nacional das Mulheres Portuguesas (National Council of Portuguese Women - CNMP), at the invitation of the vice president, Sara Beirão. The CNMP was a feminist organization, led by doctor and suffragist Adelaide Cabete, with the aim of fighting and defending the social and political rights of women. Paiva Cruz was the president of the CNMP's Art Commission in 1938.

== Death ==
Abigail de Paiva Cruz died in the Portuguese capital of Lisbon on 8 October 1944, of enteritis. She did not marry and had no children. She was buried in the Agramonte Cemetery in Porto, where there was a family tomb.
