= Portugal Resident =

English-language newspaper in Portugal

- Type: Weekly newspaper
- Format: Tabloid
- Owner: Open Media Group
- Founded: 1989
- Language: English
- Headquarters: Algarve, Portugal
- Website: www.portugalresident.com

Portugal Resident, formerly The Algarve Resident, is an English-language weekly newspaper published in Portugal. Established in 1989, the tabloid newspaper primarily serves an English-speaking readership in the Algarve.

The newspaper was acquired by Open Media Group in 2012.

== History ==
The Algarve Resident was established in 1989. A 1997 academic paper published by the University of the Algarve examined coverage in The Algarve Resident alongside Portuguese news magazine Visão, comparing how the two publications reported the same story.

In March 2012, Portuguese media industry publication Meios & Publicidade reported that Open Media had acquired Algarve Resident from MMS Publishing. The publication described it at the time as a weekly Algarve newspaper aimed at the foreign resident population of the region.

In 2014, following Open Media's acquisition of Portuguese-language regional newspaper Barlavento, the group said journalists from Algarve Resident and Barlavento were working together.

== Publication ==
The newspaper primarily serves readers in the Algarve. It is also distributed through newsagents elsewhere in Portugal.

A 2020 study of foreign-language media in the Algarve identified The Algarve Resident and The Portugal News as the two most widely known and read English-language weekly newspapers among the foreign-language media operating in the region.

== See also ==
- List of newspapers in Portugal
