= O Século =

Portuguese daily newspaper

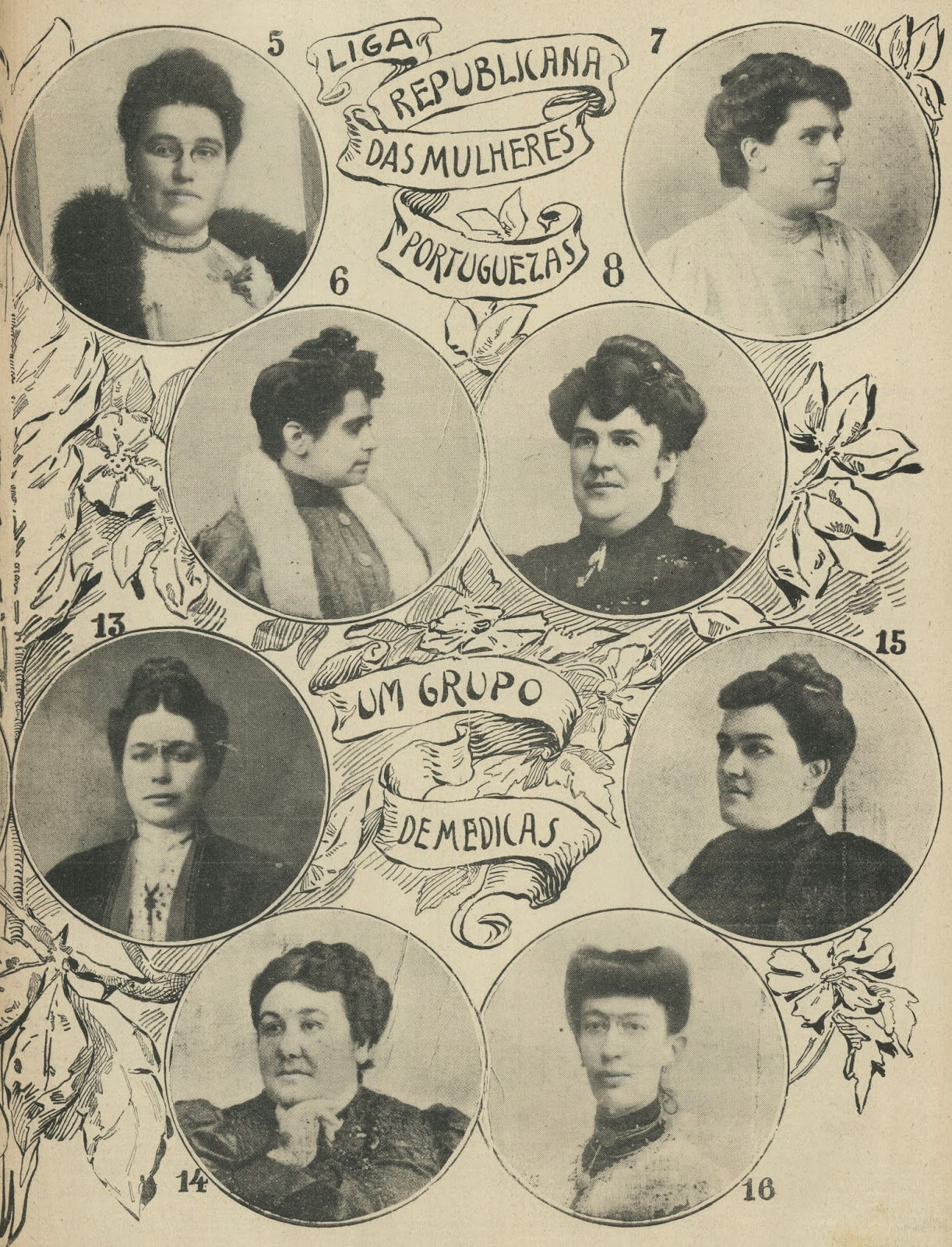
Supplement to the newspaper O Século about the suffragettes of the Liga Republicana das Mulheres Portuguesas, published on May 12, 1910: 5 - Ana de Castro Osório; 6 - Maria Veleda; 7 - Beatriz Paes Pinheiro de Lemos; 8 - Maria Clara Correia Alves; 13 - Sofia Quintino; 14 - Adelaide Cabete; 15 - Carolina Beatriz Ângelo; 16 - Maria do Carmo Joaquina Lopes.

O Século (meaning The Century in English) was a Portuguese daily newspaper published in Lisbon, Portugal, from 1881 to 1977.

== History and profile ==
O Século was first published on 4 January 1881. The founder was Sebastião de Magalhães Lima, who had studied law at the University of Coimbra. It was a newspaper of record, and a great rival of the Diário de Notícias.

O Século was owned by the Sociedade Nacional de Tipografia before the Carnation Revolution in 1974. The paper ceased publication on 3 February 1977.

== See also ==
- List of newspapers in Portugal
