= Lutegarda Guimarães de Caires =

Portuguese women's rights activist

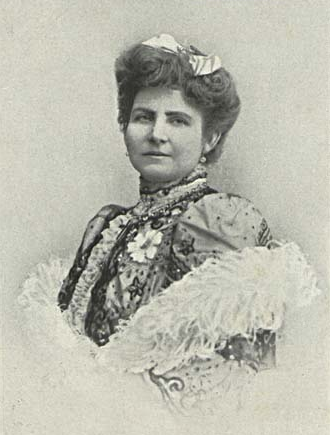
Lutegarda Guimarães de Caires

Lutegarda Guimarães de Caires, also Lutgarda and Luthegarda, (1858–1935) was a Portuguese women's rights activist and poet. She is remembered for starting the Portuguese tradition of bringing gifts of clothes, toys and sweets to children in hospital at Christmas. She fought successfully to have conditions for female prisoners significantly improved. In addition to her award-winning poetry, Lutgarda de Caires published articles in the press calling for equal opportunities for women and improvements to their property rights.

== Biography ==
Born in Vila Real de Santo António in 1858, Lutgarda Guimarães was the daughter of María Teresa de Barros y José Rodrigues Guimarães. After her mother died when she was still a small child, she and her brother were lovingly cared for by her father who introduced them to the harp, violin and sitar.

While still young, Guimarães left the Algarve and moved to Lisbon where she met and later married João de Caires, a lawyer from Madeira. He founded the Sociedade de Propaganda de Portugal which met regularly in their home, bringing together guests interested in discussing literature. Guimarães also took part in the meetings but was initially saddened by the death of her infant daughter. It was her daughter's death that encouraged her to take clothes, toys and sweets to the children in the Hospital da Estefânia.

From 1905, she began to contribute articles on social issues to newspapers and journals. As for her poetry, her first work was Glicínias (1910). Other popular works were Papoilas (1912) and A Dança do Destino, contos e narrativas (1913). In 1923, her sonnet Florinha da Rua won the first prize in the Hispano-Portuguese Floral Games in Ceuta.

In 1911, the Ministry of Justice invited her to undertake a study of the conditions in which prisoners lived, especially women. As a result of her criticisms, improvements followed.

In June 1913, she, Ana Augusta de Castilho, Beatriz Pinheiro, Joana de Almeida Nogueira and Maria Veleda were part of the Portuguese delegation at the Seventh Conference of the International Woman Suffrage Alliance in Budapest.

Lutgarda Guimarães de Caires died in Lisbon in 1935.

Lutegarda Guimarães died at the age of 76, at her residence, the second floor right of number 53 of Avenida da Liberdade, parish of São José, in Lisbon, her age being erroneously stated as 63 in the death register. The cause of death is given as breast cancer and cardiac syncope. She is buried in a family plot in the Prazeres Cemetery in Lisbon.
