= Alma feminina =

Bulletin of the Portuguese Women's National Council (1917–1946)

Alma feminina was the official bulletin of Portugal's Conselho Nacional das Mulheres Portuguesas (CNMP) (Portuguese Women’s National Council) from January 1917 to 1946.

Cover from May 1946

The Portuguese Women's National Council was formed in 1914. Its bulletin was first known simply as the Bulletin of the Portuguese Women’s National Council but its name was changed to Alma feminina (The Feminine Soul) in 1917. It was changed again to A Mulher (The Woman) in 1946 shortly before the Council was disbanded by the right-wing Estado Novo government in 1947. The name Alma feminina had in fact been used for an earlier feminist magazine edited by Virgínia Quaresma.

The Council's main means of action was the publication of the bulletin. This was distributed throughout the life of the Council for thirty-two years, between November 1914 and May 1947, in a total of 157 issues. Distributed free of charge to members, the newsletter was sent by mail. For a time, it could also be purchased from some shops in Lisbon. Being a feminist publication, aimed mainly at members, it was concerned with publicizing the association's activities and initiatives promoted by international feminist and female organizations, as well as informing readers about the situation of women and the state of feminism in other countries. In 1920, as part of a recruitment drive for the Council, copies of the bulletin were sent out to non-members considered as potential supporters. If the recipients did not return the copies they were considered to have become new members. Free issues were also sent out in 1929 and 1930, together with a membership application form, with limited success.

The first editor, known as the managing director, Maria Clara Correia Alves, stressed that the main objective of the bulletin was "… so that the Portuguese woman can get out of apathetic indifference in which she has remained for centuries and which has contributed so much to stifle its most just aspirations and to delay its emancipation". In 1921, the association's members considered it "the only voice for Portuguese women because it is the only magazine that defends the feminist cause". Although the emphasis was, therefore, on feminism, it was decided to use "feminine" rather than "feminist" in the bulletin's title because the Council's leaders were aware that "feminist" was still a pejorative word. The later change of title in 1946 was considered to "better match the nature of the publication and the purposes that we propose".

In 1920 editorial responsibility was taken over by the Council’s founder and president, Adelaide Cabete, who held the position from 1920 until August 1929. Cabete then went to Angola, and Elina Guimarães took over for a year, followed by Noémia Neto Ferreira. From May 1934 until the end of 1946 the director and editor was Sara Beirão. Publication was always irregular due to the financial problems of the association. At one extreme it would appear monthly in some years, at the other, half-yearly. In 1937, the bulletin was not published at all. This was likely due to the disruption to the Council caused by the death of its driving force, Adelaide Cabete and the absence of Sara Beirão in Brazil for eight months. However, there were also political divisions within the association, with some members supporting the Estado Novo.

Many of its articles were dedicated to Portuguese feminists such as Adelaide Cabete, Ana de Castro Osório, and Elina Guimarães as well as those from outside Portugal, such as Avril de Sainte-Croix, Jane Addams, and Simone de Beauvoir. As well as offering a medium for the promotion and development of feminist discourse, Alma Feminina also provided an outlet for creative writing by women. Two editions included a list of female-authored works, entitled Biblioteca Feminina (1923) and Biblioteca Feminista (1925). The emphasis on creative writing would have reflected the interests of several of the Council's members. Sara Beirão was a well-known writer, as was Branca de Gonta Colaço, while Maria Lamas, the president from 1945–47, was a poet and writer who in 1947 organised an exhibition of books written by women, which brought together three thousand books by 1400 women authors from thirty countries. Another contributing author was the Portuguese author of Irish descent, Maria O'Neill.
