= Beatriz Arnut =

Portuguese feminist author (1892–1958)

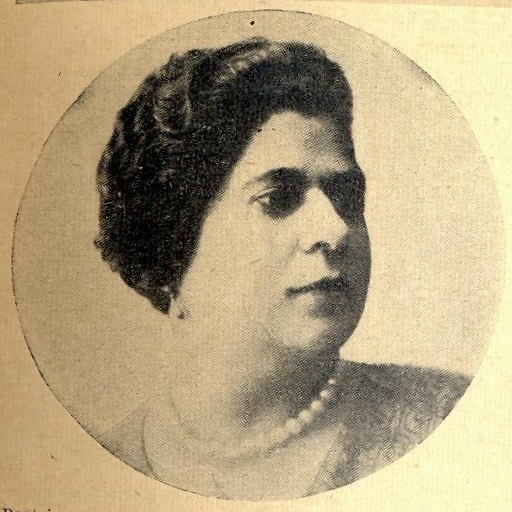
- Born: Beatriz de Jesus Arnut Baptista; 10 January 1892; Macedo de Cavaleiros, Portugal
- Died: 7 February 1958 (aged 66); Lisbon, Portugal
- Occupation: Writer

Beatriz Arnut (1892 – 1958), was a Portuguese writer, poet, civil servant and defender of women's rights.

== Early life ==
Beatriz de Jesus Arnut Baptista was born on 10 January 1892, in the municipality of Macedo de Cavaleiros in the Bragança District of northeastern Portugal. She was the daughter of Cândida Amália Arnut, a descendant of José Maria Arnaud, originally Giuseppe Maria Arnaud, an Italian industrialist involved with the production and sale of silk, who in the 18th century left Piedmont in Italy with his family to settle in Portugal to manage the Real Filatório de Chacim (Royal silk weaving factory of Chacim). Beatriz Arnut was fluent in Italian. Moving to Lisbon as an adult, she became an official at the Archives of the Ministry of Agriculture, later moving to the National Library. Later, she became president of the women's committee of the Cruzada Nun'Álvares, a conservative Portuguese political movement that aimed to find a solution to the problems of political instability that plagued the First Portuguese Republic.

== Feminism ==
Disillusioned by the establishment of the authoritarian Estado Novo government in 1933, Arnut joined the feminist Conselho Nacional das Mulheres Portuguesas (National Council of Portuguese Women - CNMP) at the invitation of writer and journalist Sara Beirão. The CNMP, whose members were primarily upper class and well-educated, advocated gender equality in all areas that shaped the role of women in Portuguese society, campaigning through petitions, newspaper and magazine articles, conferences, and other means, for the right to vote, the right to own property, the right to parental custody, and the right to education and to enter all professions. Remaining in the organization until its forced closure by the Estado Novo in 1947, Arnut held several positions, including Secretary of the council (1933-1934, 1938–1942), Secretary of the Art Section, President of the Peace Section (1937) and President of the Morality Section (1938).

Determined to support young Portuguese women who wanted to do advanced studies, Arnut instituted the Trás-os-Montes Prize, which gave scholarships to university students from the region from which she came.

== Writing ==
Arnut wrote for several Portuguese newspapers and magazines, including Diário de Notícias, Diário de Lisboa, Correio da Noite and Lisbon's Municipal Magazine, as well as the Brazilian Revista Feminina. Her published work included:

- Máguas da Mocidade (Waters of Youth: verses, 1918)
- Saudade (Nostalgia: 1924)
- Sorrisos Cor de Rosa (Pink Smiles: children's verses, 1925)
- Orações à Virgem e a Nun'Alvares (Prayers to the Virgin and to Nun'Alvares:1929)
- Altar da Luz (Altar of Light: sonnets, 1929)
- Chorando (Crying: 1930)

== Death ==
Beatriz Arnut died on 7 February 1958, at the age of 66. She had never married and had no children. She is buried in the Alto de São João Cemetery in Lisbon.
