= Liga das Mulheres Republicanas =

Feminist organization in Portugal

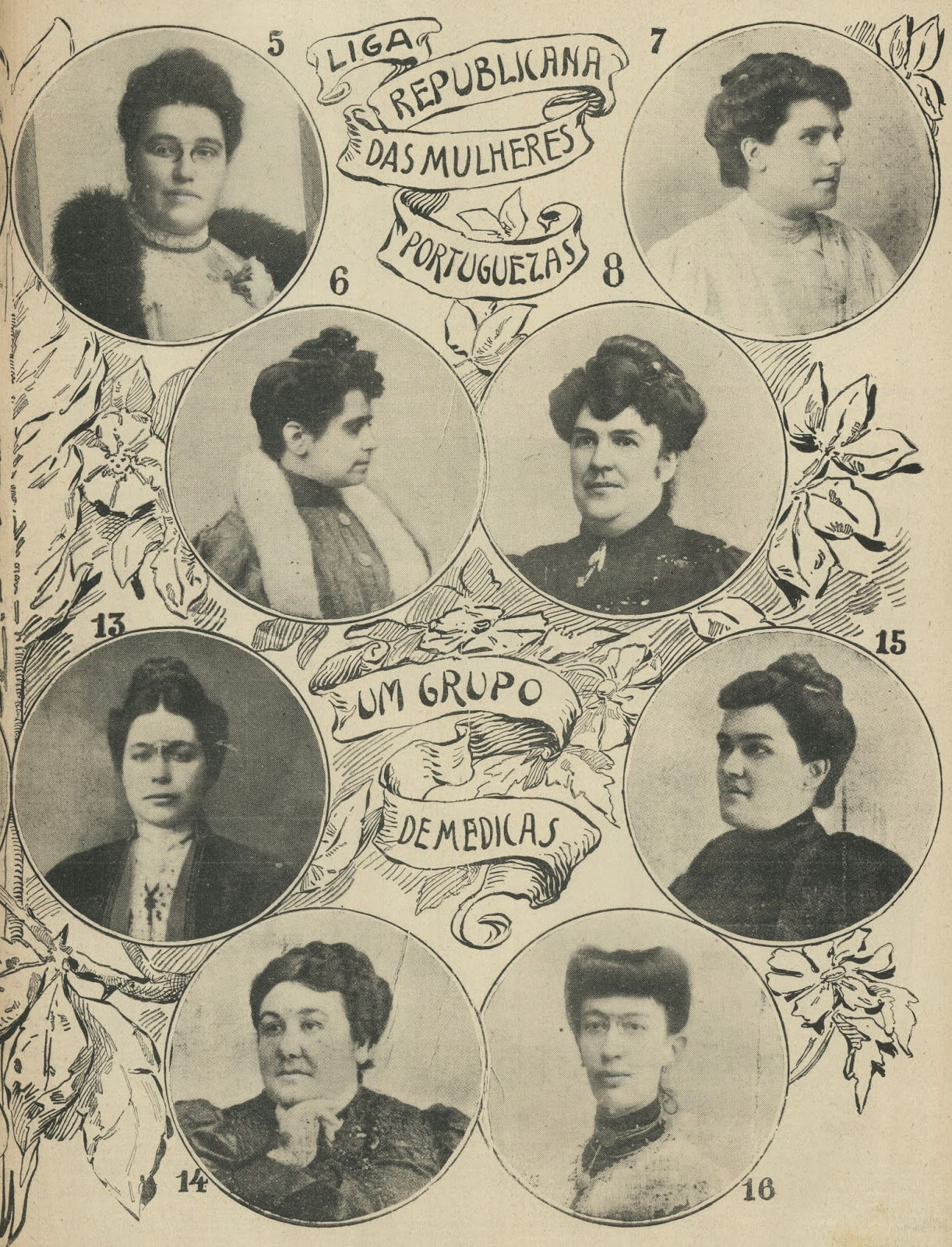
Supplement to the newspaper O Século about the suffragettes of the Liga das Mulheres Republicanas, published on May 12, 1910: 5 - Ana de Castro Osório; 6 - Maria Veleda; 7 - Beatriz Paes Pinheiro de Lemos; 8 - Maria Clara Correia Alves; 13 - Sofia Quintino; 14 - Adelaide Cabete; 15 - Carolina Beatriz Ângelo; 16 - Maria do Carmo Joaquina Lopes.

The Liga das Mulheres Republicanas (English: Republican Women's League) was a Portuguese feminist organisation founded in 1909 by Ana de Castro Osório and Adelaide Cabete. It split in 1912 after the refusal of the government to pass a law enabling women to vote. Cabete subsequently started the Conselho Nacional das Mulheres Portuguesas.

== Prominent members ==
- Adelaide Cabete, founding member;
- Adelaide Cunha Barradas;
- Adelina da Glória Paletti Berger, president of the Lagos nucleus;
- Alice Moderno;
- Antónia de Jesus da Silva;
- Alzira Augusta de Lourdes Pinto Vieira;
- Amélia França Borges;
- Ana Augusta de Castilho;
- Ana de Castro Osório, founding member and first president of LRMP (1908-1911);
- Ana Maria Gonçalves Dias;
- Angélica Lopes Viana Porto;
- Bárbara Rosa de Carvalho Pereira;
- Beatriz Pinheiro de Lemos;
- Camila Sousa Lopes;
- Carolina Beatriz Ângelo, founding member and first woman to vote in Portugal;
- Domitila de Carvalho;
- Ernestina Pereira Santos;
- Elzira Dantas Machado, first lady of the Portuguese Republic;
- Fausta Pinto da Gama;
- Filipa de Oliveira;
- Filomena Honorina da Costa;
- Joana de Almeida Nogueira;
- Judite Pontes Rodrigues;
- Lénia Loyo Pequito;
- Lídia de Oliveira;
- Luísa de Almeida;
- Manuela Porto;
- Maria Benedita Mouzinho de Albuquerque Pinho;
- Maria Clara Correia Alves;
- Maria Evelina de Sousa;
- Maria Veleda, second president of LRMP (1911-1919);
- Mariana da Assunção da Silva;
- Rita Dantas Machado, daughter of Bernardino Machado, third and eight president of the Portuguese Republic, and of Elzira Dantas Machado;
- Sofia Quintino;
- Virgínia da Fonseca;
- Virgínia Quaresma.
