= Combate (newspaper) =

Newspaper in Portugal (1974–1978)

Combate or O Jornal Combate was a Portuguese newspaper published in Lisbon, Portugal. It existed between June 1974 to February 1978.

== History and profile ==
The first edition of Combate appeared on 21 June 1974. The paper had a Marxist stance. Phil Mailer served as the editor of the paper. The first ten issues were published weekly. The remaining issues appeared fortnightly with interruptions until February 1978 when the paper ceased publication.
