= O Mirante =

Portugal weekly regional newspaper

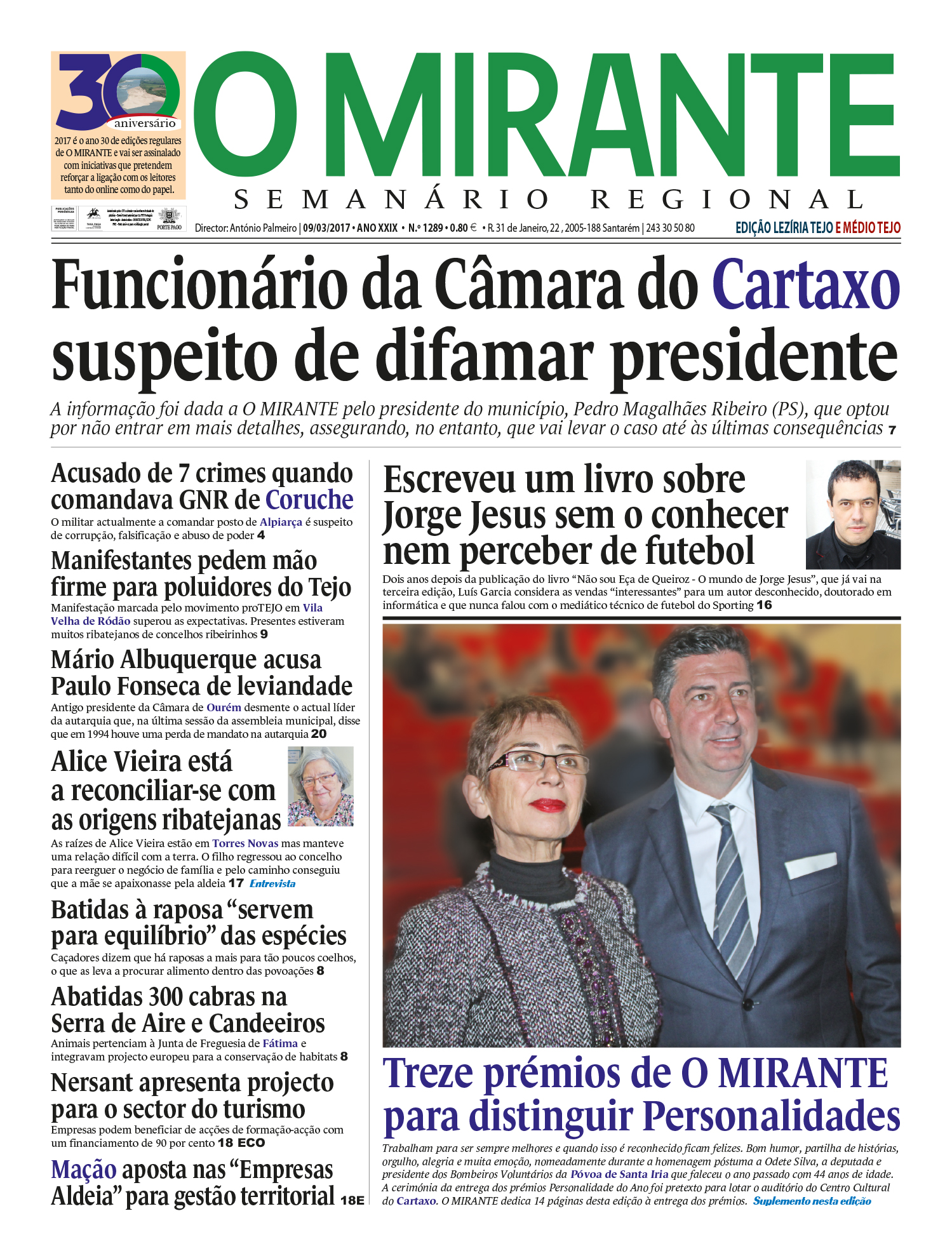

O Mirante (The Observatory) is a weekly regional newspaper published in Portugal, with three editions covering three regions of the Tagus valley. It covers sports, health, culture, leisure and general local information.

O Mirante was first published on 16 November 1987 in Chamusca, as a 16-page monthly magazine with a circulation of 2000 copies. In April 1991, it became a biweekly publication with 24 pages. In March 1994, it began being printed in Lisbon, and in September 1995 it became a weekly newspaper. In April 2000 the company bought El Jornal of the Tagus Valley, expanding its regional coverage; and in September 2003 it merged with the Belvedere, increasing total circulation to 35,000.

The newspaper went online in November 2002, and in October 2004 began providing daily updates to the online edition. The newspaper is privately owned by the Emídio family.
