= Sofia Quintino =

Portuguese physician, feminist, and nursing organizer

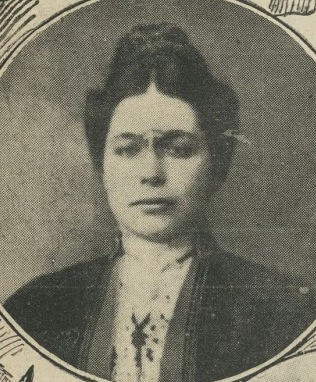
- Sofia Quintino in 1910
- Born: Sofia da Conceição Quintino; 1879; Cadaval, Portugal
- Died: 1964 (aged 84–85); Carnaxide e Queijas, Portugal
- Occupation: Physician
- Known for: Development of secular nursing in Portugal

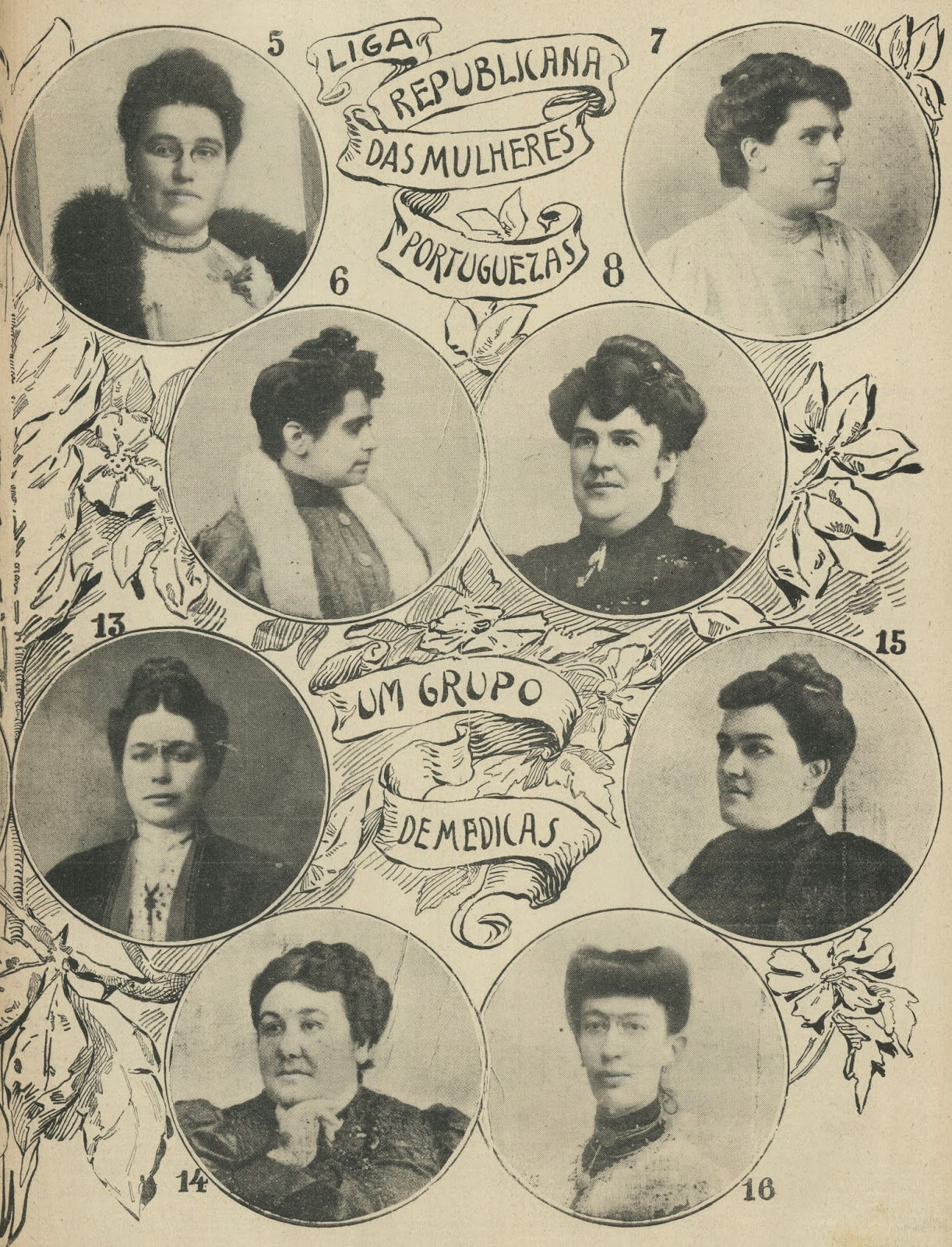
Supplement to the newspaper O Século about the suffragettes of the Liga das Mulheres Republicanas, published on May 12, 1910: 5 - Ana de Castro Osório; 6 - Maria Veleda; 7 - Beatriz Pinheiro; 8 - Maria Clara Correia Alves; 13 - Sofia Quintino; 14 - Adelaide Cabete; 15 - Carolina Beatriz Ângelo; 16 - Maria do Carmo Joaquina Lopes.

Sofia Quintino (1879-1964) was one of the first female physicians to graduate in Portugal. An active feminist, who opposed the Portuguese monarchy and feudalism, she played a particularly important role in developing a secular nursing service, in a country where nursing had previously been the preserve of nuns.

== Background and career ==
Sofia da Conceição Quintino was born in 1879 in the village of Lamas, in the municipality of Cadaval, in Portugal. She attended the Escola Médico-Cirúrgica de Lisboa (Medical-Surgical School of Lisbon), the institution that would eventually become the Faculty of Medicine at the University of Lisbon. After graduation, with a thesis entitled Some Words Regarding the Sensitization of Bacteria, she worked as an assistant at the clinical analysis laboratory that served Lisbon's public hospitals. Between 1918 and 1948 she was head of the Physiotherapy Services in public hospitals in Lisbon, also working as a general doctor and a high-school teacher. Midway through her career she returned to university and in 1931 graduated from the Faculty of Medicine of the University of Paris.

== Feminism ==
As a feminist and pacifist, she was involved with Portuguese and international pacifist groups, in addition to being a co-founder of the Portuguese Group of Feminist Studies (Grupo Português de Estudos Feministas), which was formed in 1907, led by Ana de Castro Osório, Adelaide Cabete, also a doctor with whom Quintino had studied in Lisbon, and Maria Veleda. This organization, which closed in 1908, had the aim of spreading the ideals of female emancipation. Despite its short life it formed the basis for the future development of other, longer-lasting women's movements. Quintino wrote feminist articles in a journal aimed at women, Jornal das Senhoras, and wrote training material for women, with special attention to children's health. Like most of those who shared her beliefs, she was also a Republican in favour of the overthrow of the monarchy, which took place on 5 October 1910. After the establishment of the First Portuguese Republic, and as a member of the Republican League of Portuguese Women, she argued strongly to change the law to permit divorce.

== Nursing ==
The outbreak of World War I (1914–18) led to the creation of several women's movements in support of soldiers and the war wounded, as well as their families. "Assistance of the Portuguese to the Victims of War" was formed by the Catholic Church but, arguing that such care should not be associated with religion, Sofia Quintino was one of the major drivers of Pela Pátria, a secular organization created in 1914, that conducted the first nursing courses in Portugal that were not held just for nuns. After Germany declared war on Portugal in March 1916, Quintino was head of nursing training of the Portuguese Women's Crusade, which provided assistance to the mobilized soldiers and was one of the first institutions in Portugal to organize women for the war effort, carrying out activities such as making warm clothes that were sent to the front.
