= Maria Clara Correia Alves =

Portuguese feminist and feminist writer

- Born: 1869; Montemor-o-Novo, Portugal
- Died: 1948 (aged 78–79); Portugal
- Known for: Feminist. Editor of the newsletter of the National Council of Portuguese Women from 1914 to 1920

Maria Clara Correia Alves (1869 – 1948) was a Portuguese feminist. She was one of the founders of the National Council of Portuguese Women in 1914 and both the Secretary-General of the Council and the editor of its newsletter from 1914 to 1920.

== Early life and activism ==
Maria Clara Correia Alves was born in Montemor-o-Novo in the Evora District of Portugal in 1869. She became a feminist, a Freethinker, and a Freemason. Combining feminism and freethinking, she made a presentation at the 17th International Free Thought Congress on the subject of La Libre Pensée et L´Emancipacion de la Femme (Free thought and the Emancipation of Women). Anti-clerical, with a strong interest in education, she was an early proponent of the secularisation of education in Portugal. She also campaigned in favour of divorce.

== National Council of Portuguese Women ==
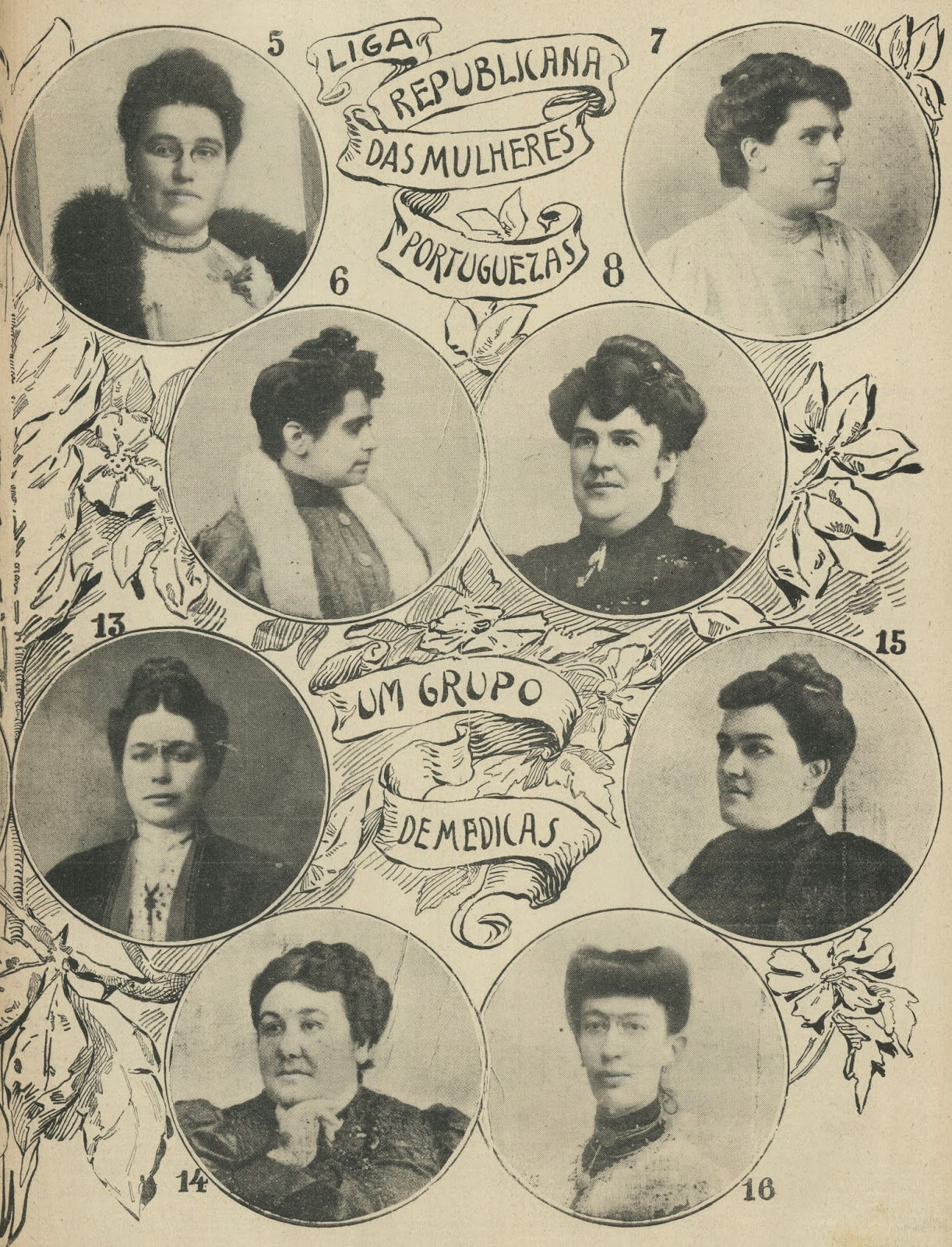
Supplement to the newspaper O Século about the suffragettes of the Liga das Mulheres Republicanas, published on May 12, 1910: 5 - Ana de Castro Osório; 6 - Maria Veleda; 7 - Beatriz Pinheiro; 8 - Maria Clara Correia Alves; 13 - Sofia Quintino; 14 - Adelaide Cabete; 15 - Carolina Beatriz Ângelo; 16 - Maria do Carmo Joaquina Lopes.

Alves joined the Republican League of Portuguese Women, which both sought the end of the Portuguese monarchy and advocated for women's suffrage. She was a founding member of the feminist Conselho Nacional das Mulheres Portuguesas (National Council of Portuguese Women - CNMP) in 1914, and was largely responsible for establishing linkages with prominent figures of the international feminist movement. In 1914 there was intense correspondence between Alves and the National Council of French Women (CNFF) and the International Council of Women (ICW) general secretaries, Avril de Sainte-Croix and Alice Salomon, as well as with other feminists such as Lady Aberdeen and Carrie Chapman Catt.

Alves became the Council's first Secretary-General from 1914 to 1919 and then proposed that the task should be split into two in subsequent years. She then served one year as Secretary-General (Exterior). Alves was the first managing editor of the Council's monthly Official Bulletin, from 1914 to 1916, and of the newsletter or magazine Alma feminina (Feminine soul) which superseded it in 1917, which she edited until 1920. The use of the word feminine rather than feminism in the title of the newsletter was because the leaders of the association were aware that for many people in Portugal "feminism" was pejorative. They wanted to show that the feminism they advocated was moderate.

In 1917, she stated that the main objective of the bulletin was so that "the Portuguese woman can get out of apathetic indifference that she has remained in for centuries, which has contributed so much to stifle her most just aspirations and to delay her emancipation". In 1921, the Council's activists considered it "the only spokesperson for Portuguese women because it is the only magazine that defends the feminist cause". However, publication of Alma feminina caused financial problems for the Council and both Alves and the President of the Board, Adelaide Cabete, offered to cover the shortfall in 1919, so that the newsletter could continue to be published. Alves resigned as editor in mid-1920, but served as vice-president of the CNMP in 1921.

== Later life ==
In the 1930s, Alves collaborated with Pensamento magazine, writing several articles on feminism. She also served as the Director of a Municipal Library in Lisbon.

Maria Clara Correia Alves died in 1948.
