= Ana Augusta de Castilho =

Portuguese feminist

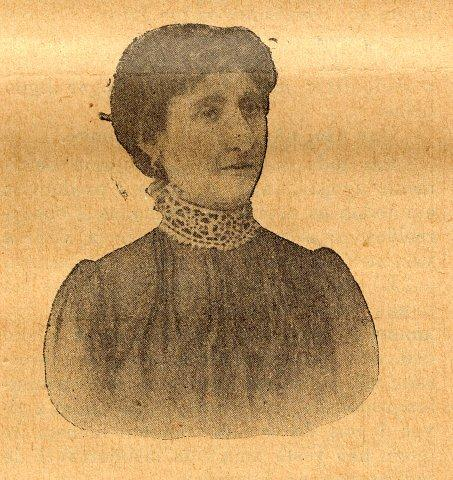
- Born: 16 March 1860; Angra do Heroísmo, Terceira Island, Azores, Portugal
- Died: 1 December 1916 (Aged 56); Lisbon
- Resting place: Alto de São João Cemetery, Lisbon
- Known for: Activities related to women's rights
- Spouse: João Maria de Castilho
- Children: None

Ana Augusta de Castilho (1860 – 1916) was a Portuguese feminist, teacher, propagandist, freemason, and republican activist opposed to the Portuguese monarchy.

== Early life ==
Ana Augusta de Castilho was born on 16 March 1860 (some sources say 1866) in the parish of Sé in the town of Angra do Heroísmo, on Terceira Island in the Azores. Little is known about her early life, except that she had a sister. She seems to have married in 1902 in the city of Porto to João Maria de Castilho, a widowed music teacher, who was much older than she.

== Activism ==
After the 5 October 1910 revolution, which overthrew the Portuguese monarchy, Castilho moved to the Portuguese capital of Lisbon, where she began to work as a teacher. She joined the Liga das Mulheres Republicanas (Republican League of Portuguese Women), and was part of a team of nurses organised by the League in 1912. She was a member of its board, being deputy president in 1912, and treasurer in 1913 and 1914. She spoke at a rally organized to celebrate the defeat in Chaves in October 1911 of troops loyal to the King, who were under the leadership of Henrique Mitchell de Paiva Couceiro.

Castilho was a pioneer in the claim for women's rights. In addition to the Republican League of Portuguese Women, she was a member of the Associação de Propaganda Feminista (Portuguese Feminist Propaganda Association). Together with Ana de Castro Osório, Antónia Bermudes and Maria Benedita Mouzinho de Albuquerque de Faria Pinho, she was also one of the founders of Pela Pátria, which had the aim of collecting donations and warm clothing for Portuguese soldiers, in case the country joined the First World War. This was subsequently merged into the Portuguese Women's Crusade (Cruzada das Mulheres Portuguesas), after Germany's declaration of war on Portugal on 9 March 1916. The Crusade had similar aims of collecting donations to send to Portuguese soldiers and also to help war orphans. Castilho was a member of the Group of Thirteen (Grupo das Treze), symbolically constituted by thirteen women who wished to combat ignorance and superstitions, religious dogmatism and conservatism that affected the Portuguese society and prevented the emancipation of women and human progress. Among the 13 was Maria Veleda, founder of the Propaganda Association.

Although the life of the Republican League was fairly short, it produced a newspaper, A Madrugada, with which Castilho was actively involved. She also worked on the publication produced by the Feminist Propaganda Association, called A Semeadora. In 1913 she was one of the participants from Portugal in the Seventh Conference of the International Woman Suffrage Alliance, which met in Budapest, Hungary. She also worked with Obra Maternal, an institution dedicated to the protection of abandoned children, orphans and beggars, or those who were at risk of falling into the world of crime and prostitution. She was its president in 1914 and 1915. In 1913, she collaborated in a campaign in support of a decision by Parliament not to allow bail for alleged violators of minors. She attempted to found an organization called Solidariedade Feminina, with the intention of offering daytime and evening classes for women and for girls over twelve years. However, due to the lack of a sufficient number of registrations, despite intense publicity, it ended up not being implemented.

== Freemasonry ==
Like many other activists, she belonged to the Grande Oriente Lusitano Unido (GOLU) masonic lodge, taking for herself the symbolic name of Brites de Almeida, a Portuguese heroine associated with the victory of the Portuguese, against Castilian forces.

== Death ==
Ana Augusta de Castilho died in Lisbon on 1 December 1916, a victim of lung congestion. She had no children. Her death was widely reported, both in Portugal and in Spain. She is buried in a family tomb in the Alto de São João Cemetery in Lisbon. The funeral was attended by most of the leading members of Portugal's women's organizations.
