= Carolina Beatriz Ângelo =

Portuguese feminist and suffragist

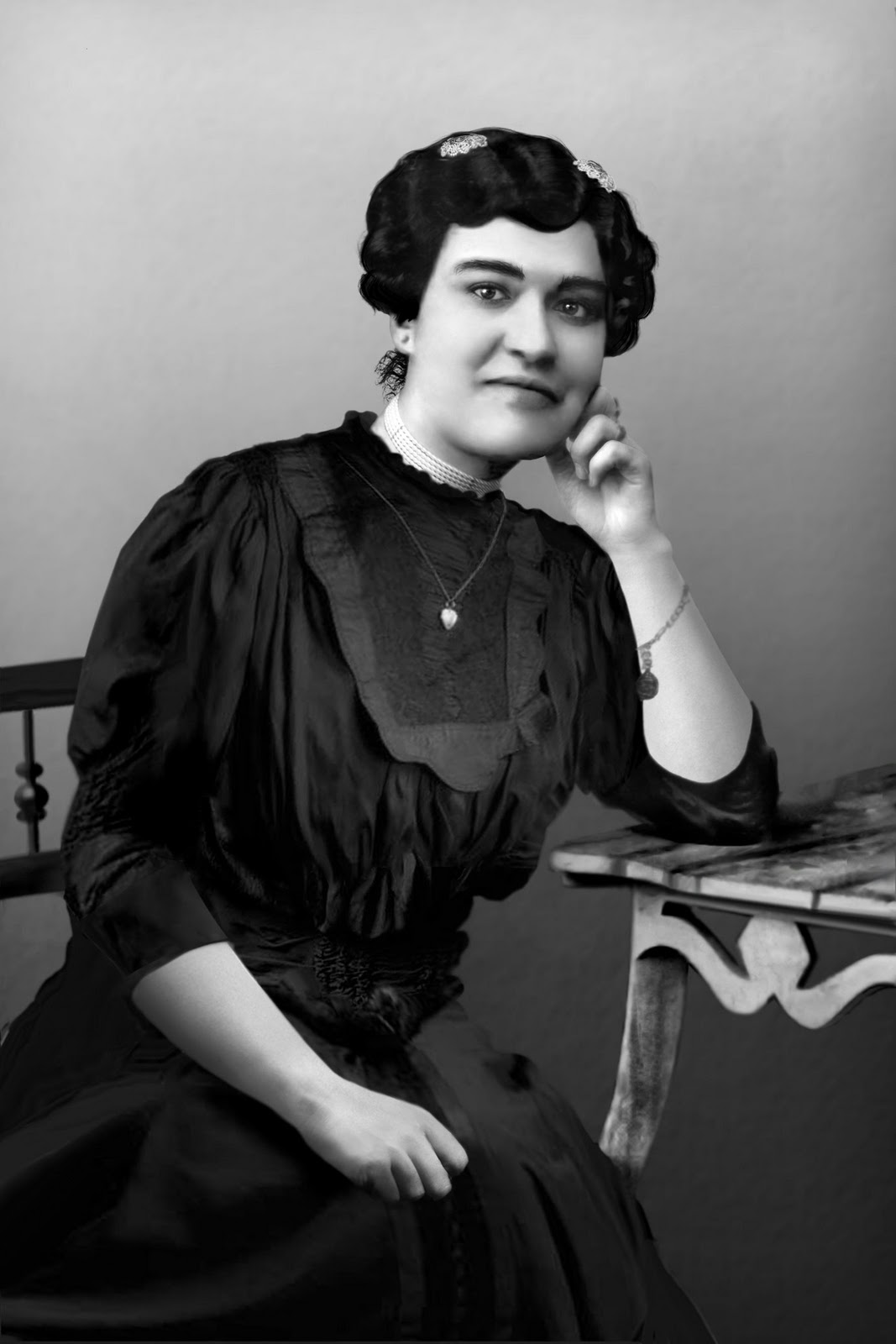
- Carolina Beatriz Ângelo
- Born: 6 April 1878; Guarda, Portugal
- Died: 3 October 1911 (aged 33); Lisbon, Portugal
- Education: Medical School Lisbon
- Occupation: Physician
- Known for: Voting in 1911, the first woman in Portugal to do so
- Spouse: Januario Barreto (1902-1910)
- Children: Maria Emília
- Parent(s): Emília Clementina de Castro Barreto; Viriato António Ângelo

Carolina Beatriz Ângelo (16 April 1878 – 3 October 1911) was a Portuguese surgeon and the first woman to vote in Portugal.

== Life ==
Carolina Beatriz Ângelo was a medical doctor practising in Lisbon. She was a feminist and suffragette who participated in multiple women's associations. She was a leader of the League of Republican Women and, in 1911, she and Adelaide Cabete founded the Portuguese Association of Feminist Propaganda (Associação de Propaganda Feminista) of which Ana de Castro Osório became the head.

== Vote ==
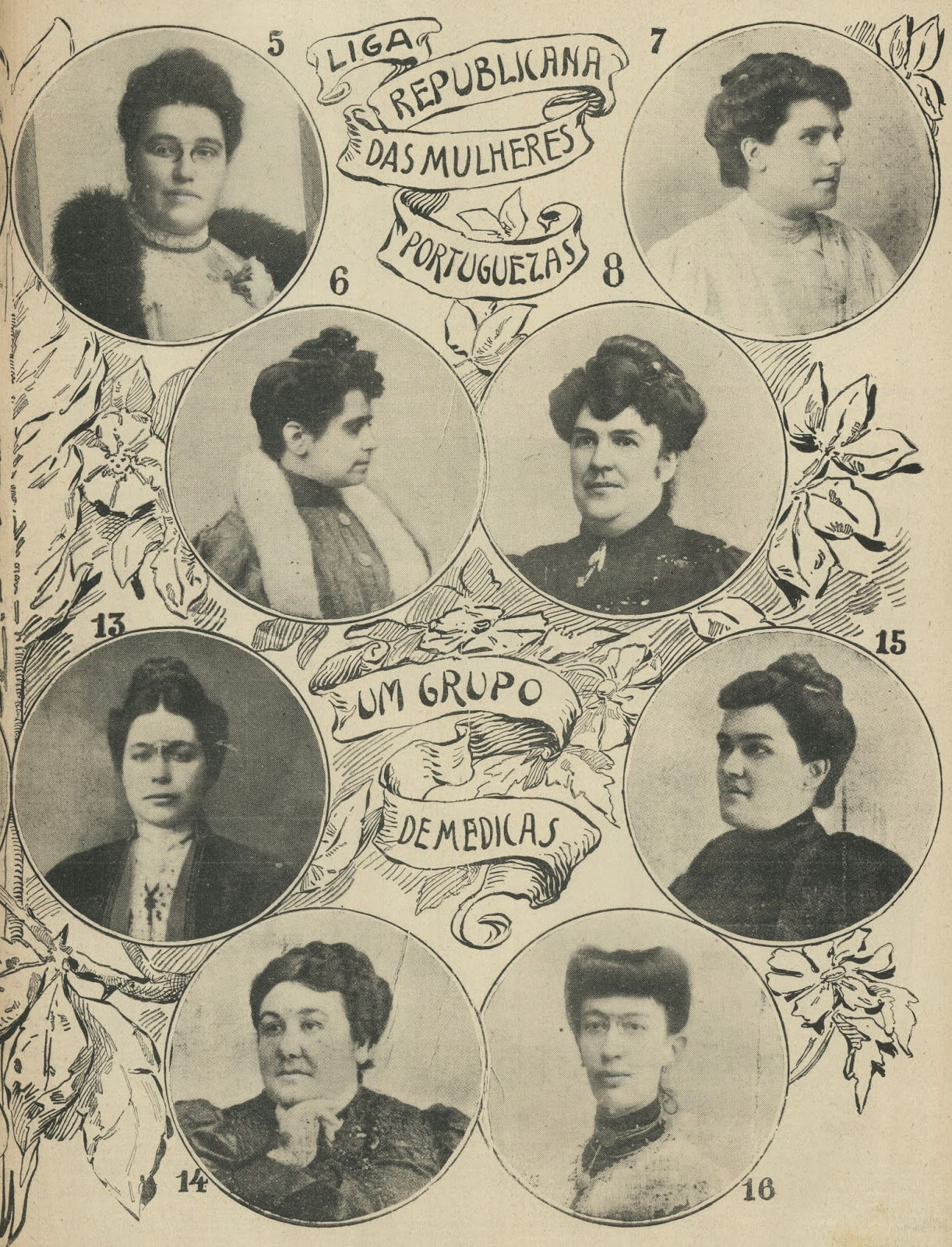
Supplement to the newspaper O Século about the suffragettes of the Liga das Mulheres Republicanas, published on May 12, 1910: 5 - Ana de Castro Osório; 6 - Maria Veleda; 7 - Beatriz Pinheiro; 8 - Maria Clara Correia Alves; 13 - Sofia Quintino; 14 - Adelaide Cabete; 15 - Carolina Beatriz Ângelo; 16 - Maria do Carmo Joaquina Lopes.

On May 28, 1911 Ângelo cast her vote to elect representatives to the Constituent National Assembly in 1911 in the first elections after the overthrown of the monarchy in the Republican Revolution on 5 October 1910. She used the ambiguity of the law, which granted the right to vote to literate head-of-households over 21, to cast her vote. As a widow and the mother of a daughter, she was a head-of-household. Shortly thereafter, on July 3, 1913, a law was passed to specify the right to vote was only for male citizens, literate and over 21. Her act was widely reported on throughout Portugal and among feminist associations in other countries.

== Tribute ==
On May 28, 2021, Google celebrated her with a Google Doodle.
