= Maria O'Neill =

Portuguese writer, poet, journalist and feminist (1873–1932)

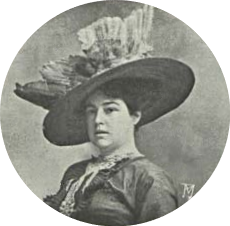
- O'Neill in 1912
- Born: Maria da Conceição Infante de Lacerda Pereira de Eça Custance O'Neill; 19 November 1873; Lisbon, Portugal
- Died: 23 March 1932 (aged 58); Atlantic Ocean, aboard General Osório
- Occupations: Writer; poet; journalist
- Spouse: António de Bulhões (m. 1890)
- Children: 4
- Relatives: Alexandre O'Neill (grandson)
- Writing career
- Language: Portuguese
- Genres: Poetry; fiction; children's literature; journalism
- Movements: Feminism; spiritualism

Maria da Conceição Infante de Lacerda Pereira de Eça Custance O'Neill (19 November 1873 – 23 March 1932) was a Portuguese writer, poet, journalist and feminist. A prolific contributor to Portuguese periodicals, she wrote fiction and poetry for adults and children and was active in the National Council of Portuguese Women.

== Early life and family ==
O'Neill was born in Lisbon on 19 November 1873. She was the daughter of Carlos Tomás O'Neill and Maria Carlota Pereira de Eça Infante de Lacerda. Through her father she descended from the Portuguese branch of the Irish O'Neill dynasty.

== Writing career ==
O'Neill wrote poetry, novels, short stories, children's literature and journalism. Her detective-story collection Um Imitador de Sherlock Holmes appeared in the magazine Serões in 1909. Literary scholar Maria João Brito describes it as the earliest known collection of detective stories written by a Portuguese woman and notes the influence of Arthur Conan Doyle on its protagonist and methods of deduction.

She contributed regularly to periodicals in Portugal and Brazil. Her work for the Lisbon magazine A Sátira used irony and caricature to address women's social position, changing family structures and women's entry into paid work.

O'Neill was a member of the Lisbon Academy of Sciences and the National Council of Portuguese Women. At the Council's First Feminist and Education Congress in 1924 she presented papers titled Assistência e Trabalho (Assistance and Work) and As Ligas de Bondade (The Leagues of Kindness). At its second congress in 1928 she presented O Voto às Mulheres (The Vote for Women).

She was also involved in Portuguese spiritualism. O'Neill was among the women on the editorial staff of the Revista de Espiritismo, the journal of the Federação Espírita Portuguesa.

== Selected works ==
O'Neill's publications included:

- Um Imitador de Sherlock Holmes (1909), detective stories
- Tudo perdido (1910), dramatic poem
- Luta de sentimentos (1912), novel
- Horas de folga (1913), children's literature
- Para lêr nas férias (1913), children's literature
- Para divertir (1915), children's literature
- A fada loira (1917), children's literature
- As ideias de Mimi (1923), children's literature
- O animatografo (1924), children's literature
- Histórias famosas (1925), children's literature

== Personal life and death ==
O'Neill married the civil servant António de Bulhões in Lisbon in 1890; they had four children. She was the paternal grandmother of the poet Alexandre O'Neill.

O'Neill died on 23 March 1932 aboard the General Osório in the Atlantic Ocean while returning to Portugal from Brazil, where she had travelled to give lectures on spiritualism.
