= Adelaide Cabete =

Portuguese feminist

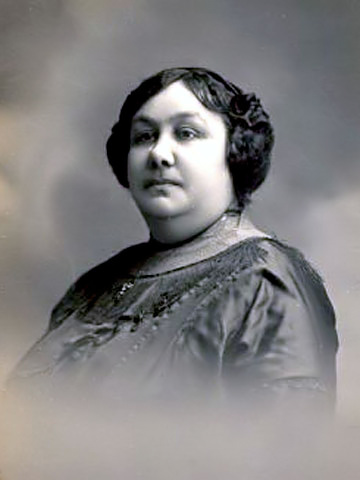
Adelaide Cabete

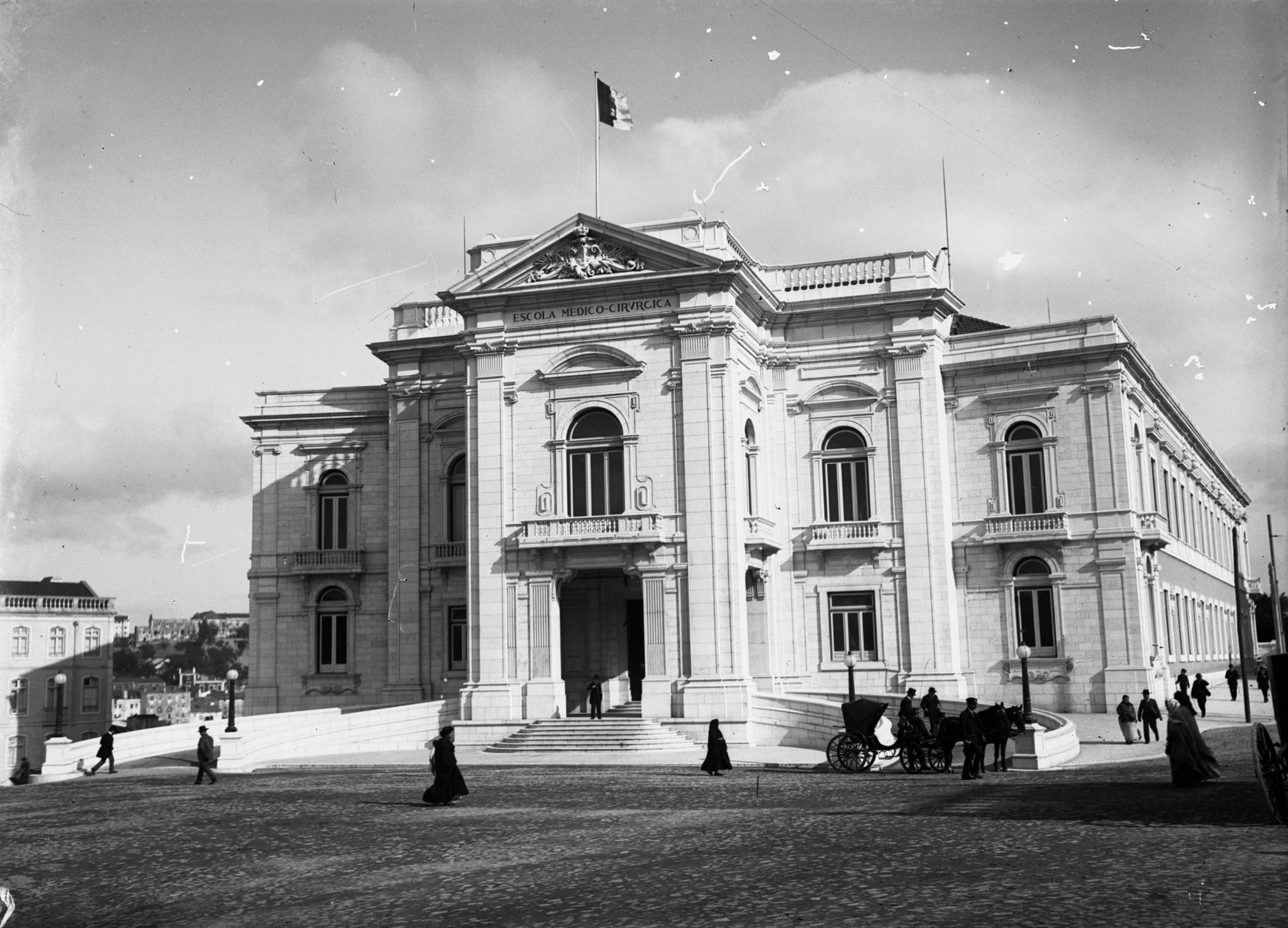
The Medical-Surgical School of Lisbon, 1900

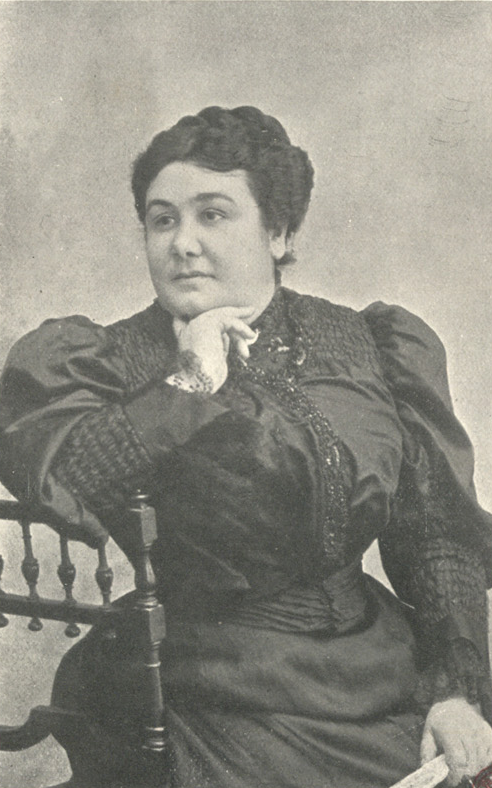
Photograph of Portuguese Republican activist Adelaide Cabete, included in the Album Republicano, published in 1908.

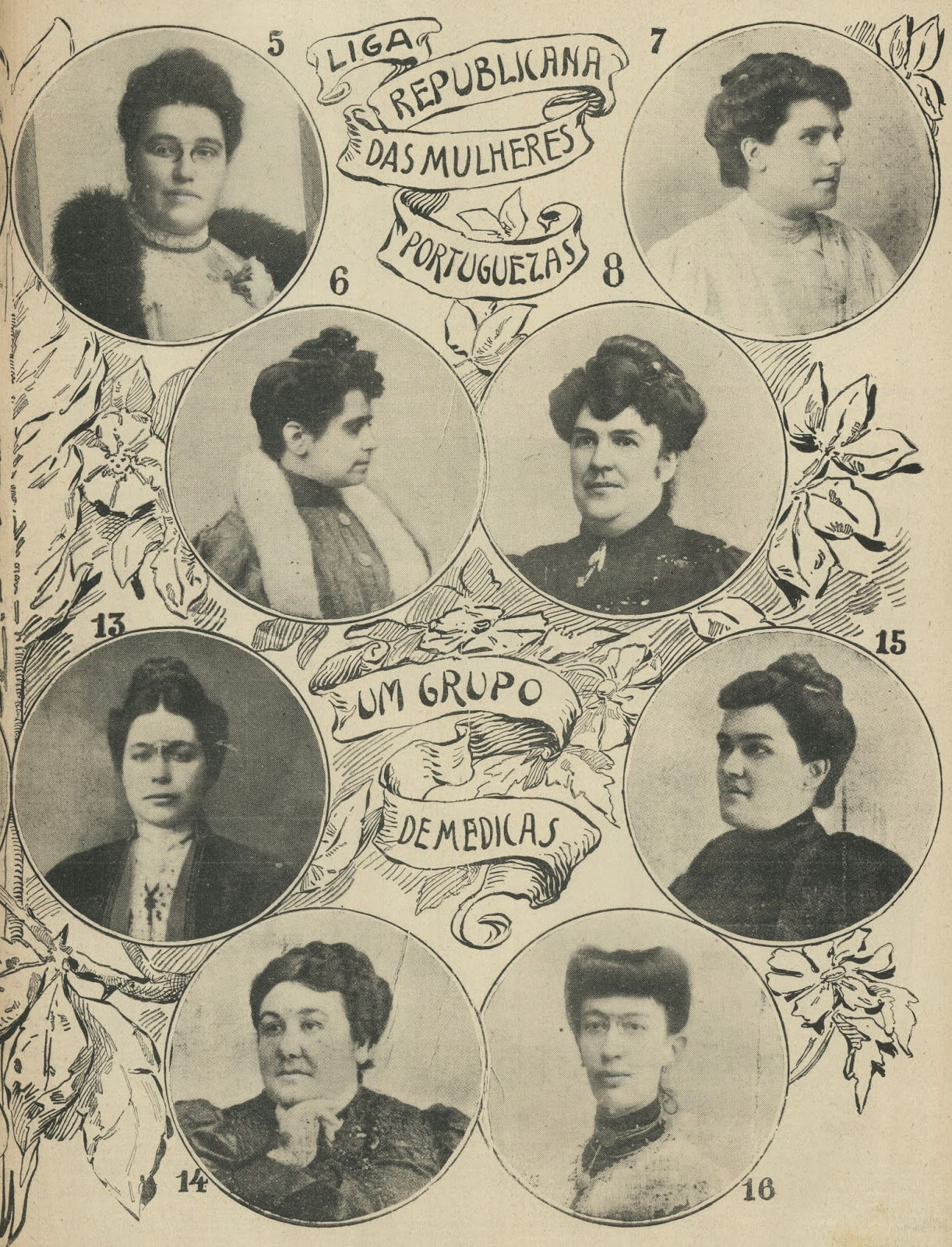
Supplement to the newspaper O Século about the suffragettes of the Liga das Mulheres Republicanas, published on May 12, 1910: 5 – Ana de Castro Osório; 6 – Maria Veleda; 7 – Beatriz Paes Pinheiro de Lemos; 8 – Maria Clara Correia Alves; 13 – Sofia Quintino; 14 – Adelaide Cabete; 15 – Carolina Beatriz Ângelo; 16 – Maria do Carmo Joaquina Lopes.

Adelaide Cabete (25 January 1867, Elvas – 14 September 1935), was one of the main Portuguese feminists of the 20th century. A staunch Republican, she was an obstetrician, gynecologist, teacher, Freemason, author, philanthropist, pacifist, abolitionist, animal rights defender and humanist.

In 1909, with Ana de Castro Osorio she created the League of Republican Women. She was the founder of the Portuguese women's organization, Conselho Nacional das Mulheres Portuguesas (CNMP), and served as its president from 1914 to 1935. Both of which supported disadvantaged women and children and promoted women's emancipation. In addition to being the lead editor of the CNMP's bulletin, Alma feminina, she wrote articles about social and medical equality for women. In 1924 and 1928, she was instrumental in organizing the first two feminist congresses in Portugal, which promoted women's political, civil, educational, and economic rights.

== Early life ==
Adelaide de Jesus Damas Brazão Cabete was born on 25 January 1867 in Alcáçova near Elvas in the Alentejo region of Portugal, the daughter of rural workers. Her father died when she was young and, to help her mother, she did not go to primary school and worked as a housemaid as a child to support her family. Despite these difficulties, she learned to read and write. At the age of 18, she married Manuel Ramos Fernandes Cabete, who encouraged her to study. At the age of twenty-two, Cabete took the primary education exam, and in 1894 she completed her high school diploma with distinction. In 1895, the couple moved to Lisbon. The following year, Adelaide Cabete enrolled at the Escola Médico-Cirúrgica de Lisboa (Medical-Surgical School of Lisbon), concluding her course in 1900 with the thesis "Protection of poor pregnant women as a means of promoting the physical development of new generations", in which she proposed the introduction of maternity leave. She was only the third woman to receive a medical degree in Portugal and went on to open her own gynaecology practice in Lisbon. She became a prominent voice in the support of maternity hospitals in Portugal, finally succeeding in 1932 when Portugal's first maternity hospital was opened.

== Activism ==
In 1907 Cabete became a freemason, joining the Grand Orient of Portugal Lodge. In 1909, together with Ana de Castro Osório, Carolina Beatriz Ângelo and other feminists who supported the abolition of monarchy, she became one of the founders of the League of Republican Women, which both sought the end of the Portuguese monarchy and advocated for women's emancipation and suffrage. As a militant republican, like her husband, she actively participated in the campaigns that preceded the revolution to the proclamation of the Portuguese Republic on 5 October 1910.

After the regime change, she worked to set up several women's organizations, most notably the Conselho Nacional das Mulheres Portuguesas (National Council of Portuguese Women), of which she would be president from 1914 to her death in 1935. From 1920 to 1929 she also edited the Council's bulletin, Alma feminina. She helped organise the first two feminist congresses held in Portugal, in 1924 and 1928. She wrote many articles, primarily of a medical nature, but also in line with her social concerns. These included: "Role that the Study of Childcare, Feminine Hygiene, etc. must play in Domestic Education" (1913), and "Protection of Pregnant Women" (1924). She also wrote feminist articles in Alma feminina and elsewhere. She advocated sex education for children in schools, and spoke out against bullfighting and against the use of war toys. At the first feminist congress in 1924 she presented a paper on "The situation of married women regarding the couple’s property". For the time, her ideas were very progressive.

In 1929, disillusioned with the authoritarian Estado Novo government, accompanied by her nephew, Cabete went to Portuguese Angola, where she worked to defend the rights of indigenous people and to provide medical treatment. In 1934 she was injured in a firearm accident and decided to return to Lisbon. There, with her health still poor, she suffered a fall and broke a leg. She died in Lisbon on 14 September 1935.
