= Ana de Castro Osório =

Portuguese feminist

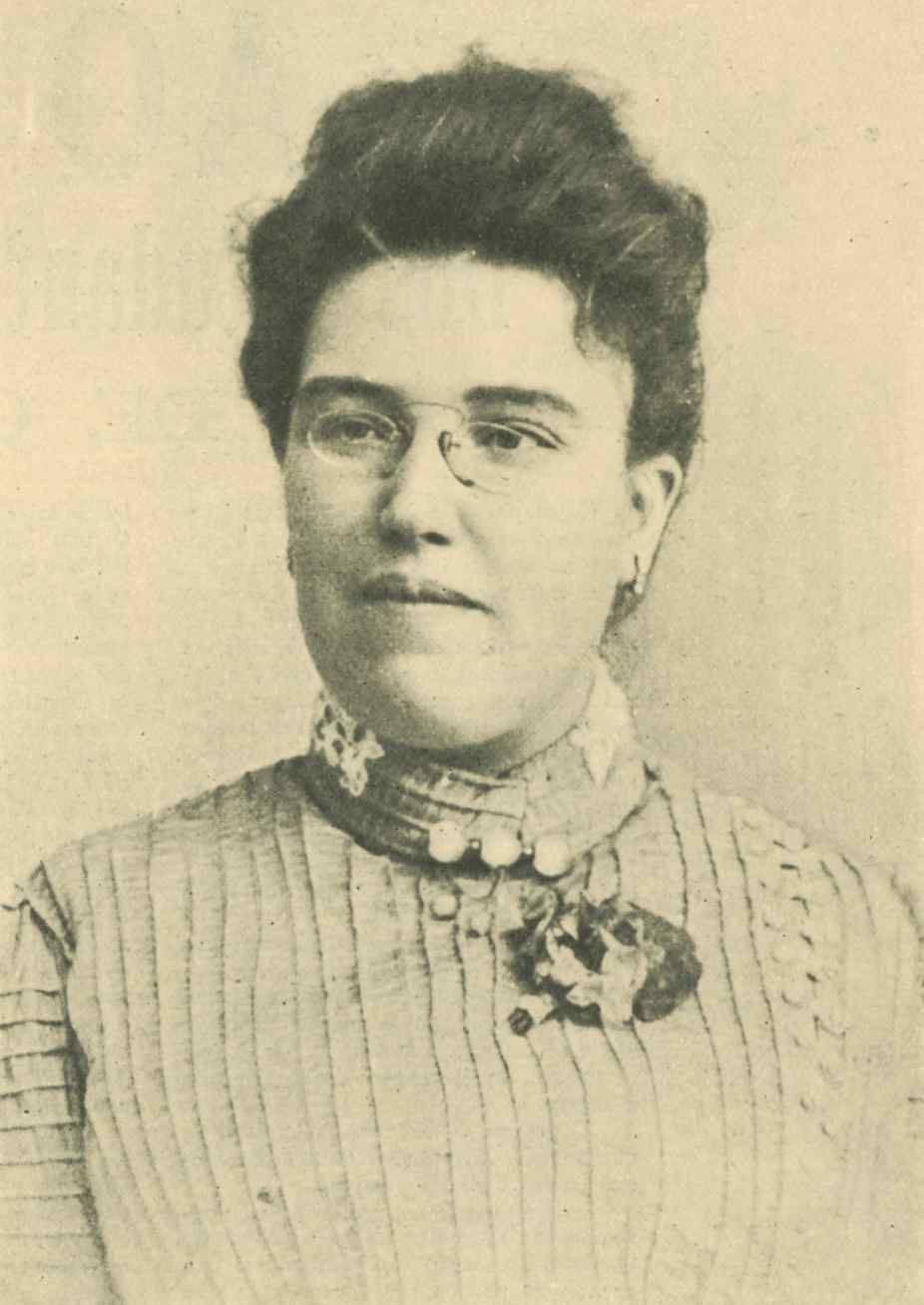
- Born: 18 June 1872; Mangualde, Portugal
- Died: 23 March 1935 (aged 62); Setúbal, Portugal
- Occupation: Writer
- Known for: Feminist and republican activist

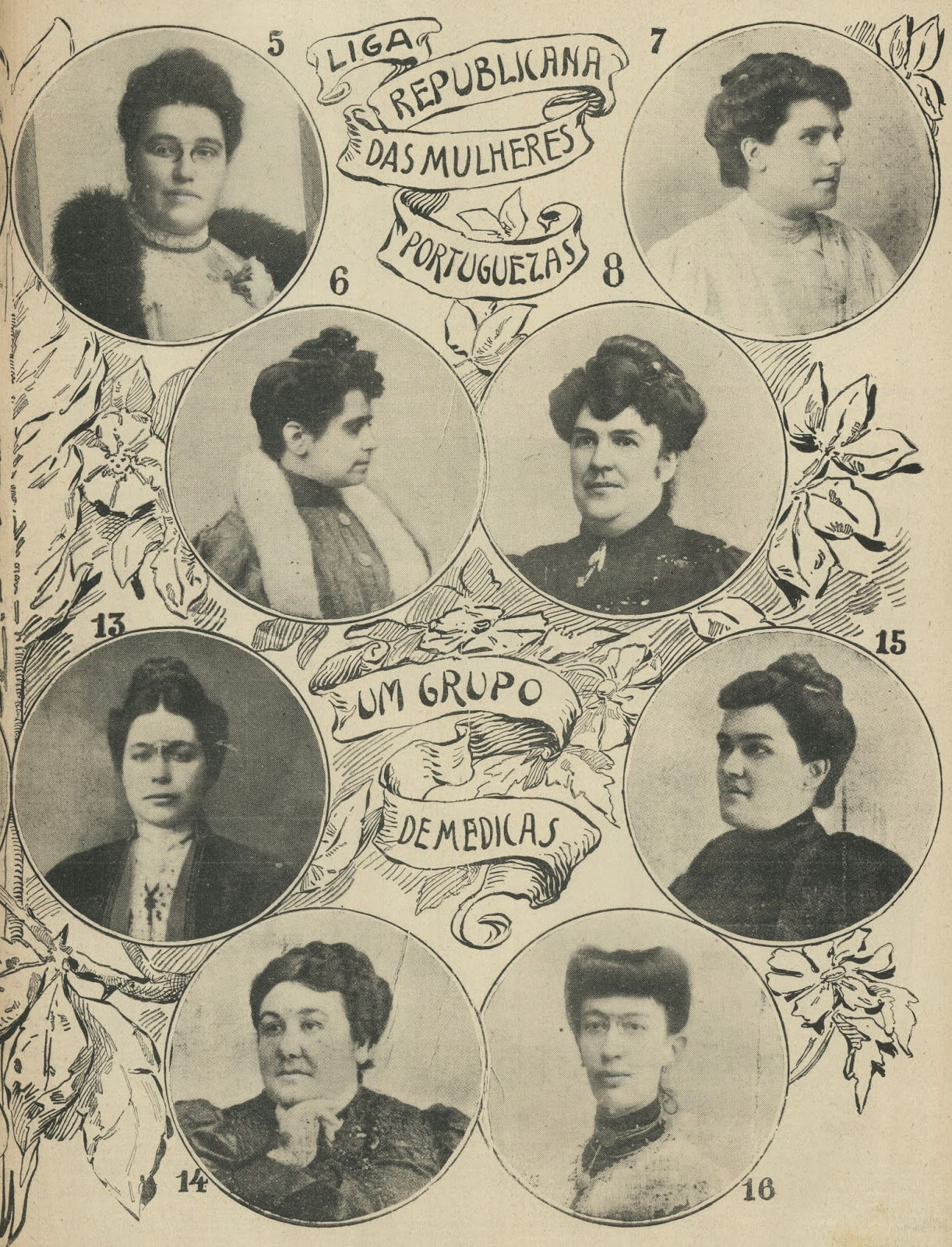
Supplement to the newspaper O Século about the suffragettes of the Liga das Mulheres Republicanas, published on May 12, 1910: 5 - Ana de Castro Osório; 6 - Maria Veleda; 7 - Beatriz Pinheiro; 8 - Maria Clara Correia Alves; 13 - Sofia Quintino; 14 - Adelaide Cabete; 15 - Carolina Beatriz Ângelo; 16 - Maria do Carmo Joaquina Lopes.

Ana de Castro Osório (18 June 1872 – 23 March 1935) was a Portuguese feminist, active in the field of children's literature and political Republicanism.

== Early life ==
Osório was born into a well-off family on 18 June 1872, her mother being Mariana Osório de Castro Cabral e Albuquerque and her father Judge João Baptista de Castro. She was influenced by her parents immense library and became a writer by age 23. In 1889, Osório married republican poet Paulino de Oliveira, with whom she had two children.

== Public life ==
In 1905, she wrote the feminist manifesto Às Mulheres Portuguesas (To Portuguese Women). This work was reflected on educated women's increasingly strong political consciousness and the involvement of women's organizations and feminism in Republicanism.

She was the founder of several women's organisations including the first feminist association, the Grupo Português de Estudos Feministas (Portuguese Group of Feminist Studies) in 1907. Together with Adelaide Cabete and Fausta Pinto de Gama, they founded the Liga Republicana das Mulheres Portuguesas (Portuguese Women's Republican League) in 1908. The group called for the overthrow of the monarchy and contributed to the proclamation of the Portuguese Republic in 1910. In 1911, Osório headed the Associação de Propaganda Feminista (Portuguese Feminist Propaganda Association) which was founded by Adelaide Cabete and Carolina Beatriz Ângelo.

In June 1913, she, Ana Augusta de Castilho, Beatriz Pinheiro, Luthgarda de Caires, Joana de Almeida Nogueira and Maria Veleda were part of the Portuguese delegation at the Seventh Conference of the International Woman Suffrage Alliance in Budapest.

In 1917, Osório was one of the founders of the Crusade of Portuguese Women which encouraged women to be active in the war effort.
