= Maria Veleda =

Portuguese educator, journalist and activist

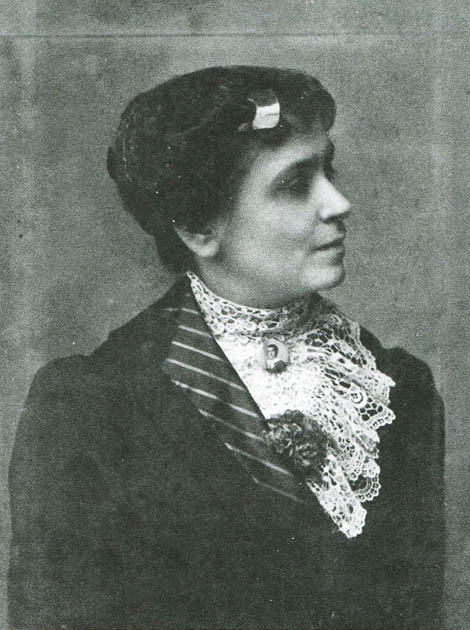
- Velda in 1912
- Born: Maria Carolina Frederico Crispin; 26 February 1871; Faro, Portugal
- Died: 8 April 1955 (aged 84); Lisbon, Portugal
- Occupations: educator, journalist and activist
- Organization(s): Republican League of Portuguese Women, Women's Democratic Propaganda Association, Light and Love
- Notable work: Emancipação Feminina

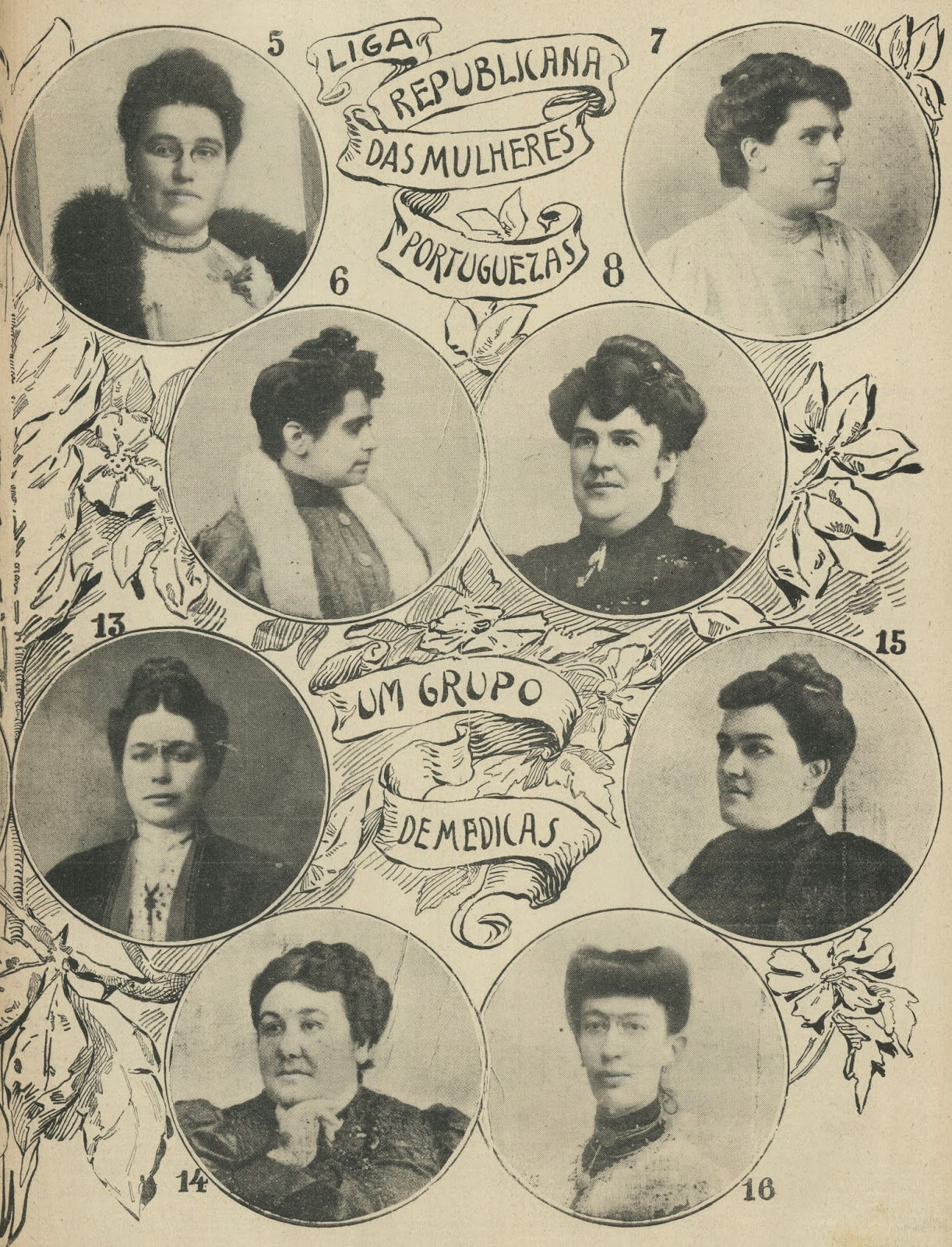
Supplement to the newspaper O Século about the suffragettes of the Liga das Mulheres Republicanas, published on May 12, 1910: 5 - Ana de Castro Osório; 6 - Maria Veleda; 7 - Beatriz Pinheiro; 8 - Maria Clara Correia Alves; 13 - Sofia Quintino; 14 - Adelaide Cabete; 15 - Carolina Beatriz Ângelo; 16 - Maria do Carmo Joaquina Lopes.

Maria Veleda, the pseudonym widely used by Maria Carolina Frederico Crispin (26 February 1871 – 8 April 1955), was a Portuguese educator, journalist and activist. One of the most effective early feminists in Portugal, she fought for the rights of women factory workers and encouraged the education of women, launching the Portuguese Group of Feminist Studies in 1907. She was a co-founder of the Republican League of Portuguese Women in 1908, later becoming President of the Board, while in 1915 she promoted the involvement of women in politics, founding the Female Association of Democratic Propaganda.

== Biography ==
Born on 26 February 1871 in Faro, Maria Carolina Frederico Crispin was the daughter of João Diogo Frederico Crispim, a proprietor, and Carlota Perpétua da Cruz Crispim.

In the early 1900s, she was active as a journalist in the south of Portugal, publishing poetry, children's stories and a booklet titled Emancipação Feminina (Women's Emancipation). In 1908, while working as a teacher at the Afonso Costa School Centre in Lisbon, she created evening courses and gave educational lectures encouraging women to enter professional life or engage in politics. In particular, she called for votes for women, training and education for women, reduced working hours and access for women to all professions. She became a member of the Republican League of Portuguese Women (RLPW). The following year, on her initiative, the RLPW founded Obra Maternal, an initiative in support of the care and education of needy or abandoned children. In 1912, she was appointed to serve as a delegate for Lisbon's Childhood Surveillance Centre, a position she maintained until 1941.

In June 1913, she, Ana Augusta de Castilho, Beatriz Pinheiro, Luthgarda de Caires and Joana de Almeida Nogueira were part of the Portuguese delegation at the Seventh Conference of the International Woman Suffrage Alliance in Budapest, Hungary.

In 1915, Veleda founded the Women's Democratic Propaganda Association (Associação Feminina de Propaganda Democrática), designed to encourage women to become free thinkers and fight inequality and militarism.

Upset by the violence of the newly founded republican regime, she abandoned politics in 1921. Instead, she turned to spiritualism, founded the Spiritualist Group Light and Love (Grupo Espiritualista Luz e Amor), organized the Portuguese Spiritual Congress (1925), and contributed articles to the spiritualist press.

Maria Veleda died in Lisbon on 8 April 1955.
