= Beatriz Pinheiro =

Portuguese writer (1872–1922)

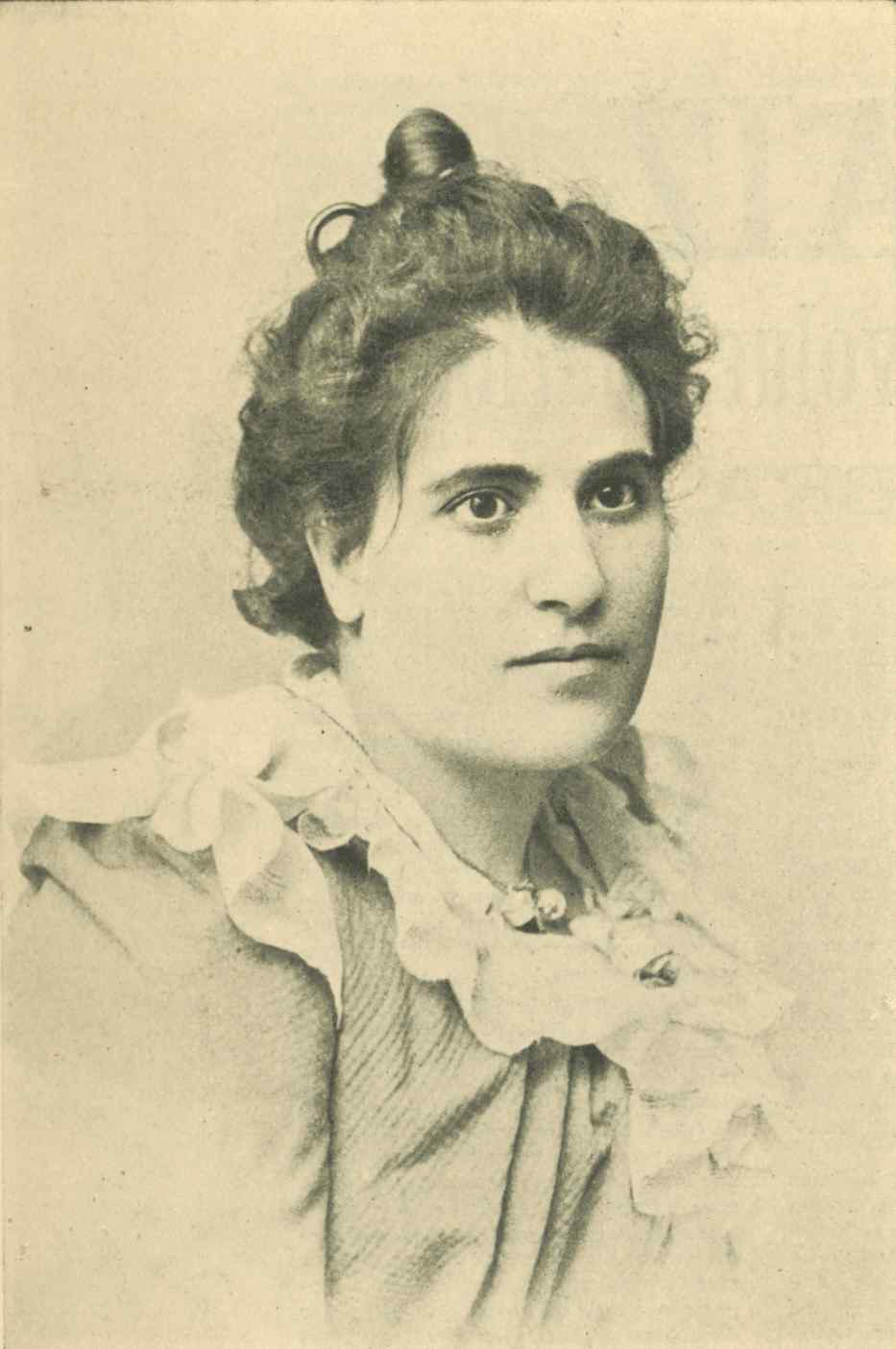
- Born: 29 October 1871; Viseu, Portugal
- Died: 14 October 1922 (aged 50); Lisbon, Portugal
- Occupations: writer and editor
- Writing career
- Pen name: Cil
- Notable work: A Mulher Portuguêsa e a Guerra Europeia

Beatriz Pinheiro or Beatriz Paes Pinheiro de Lemos (1871 – 1922) was a Portuguese writer concerned with improving the rights of women. She was a pacifist who became convinced that Portugal should fight in the First World War.

== Life ==
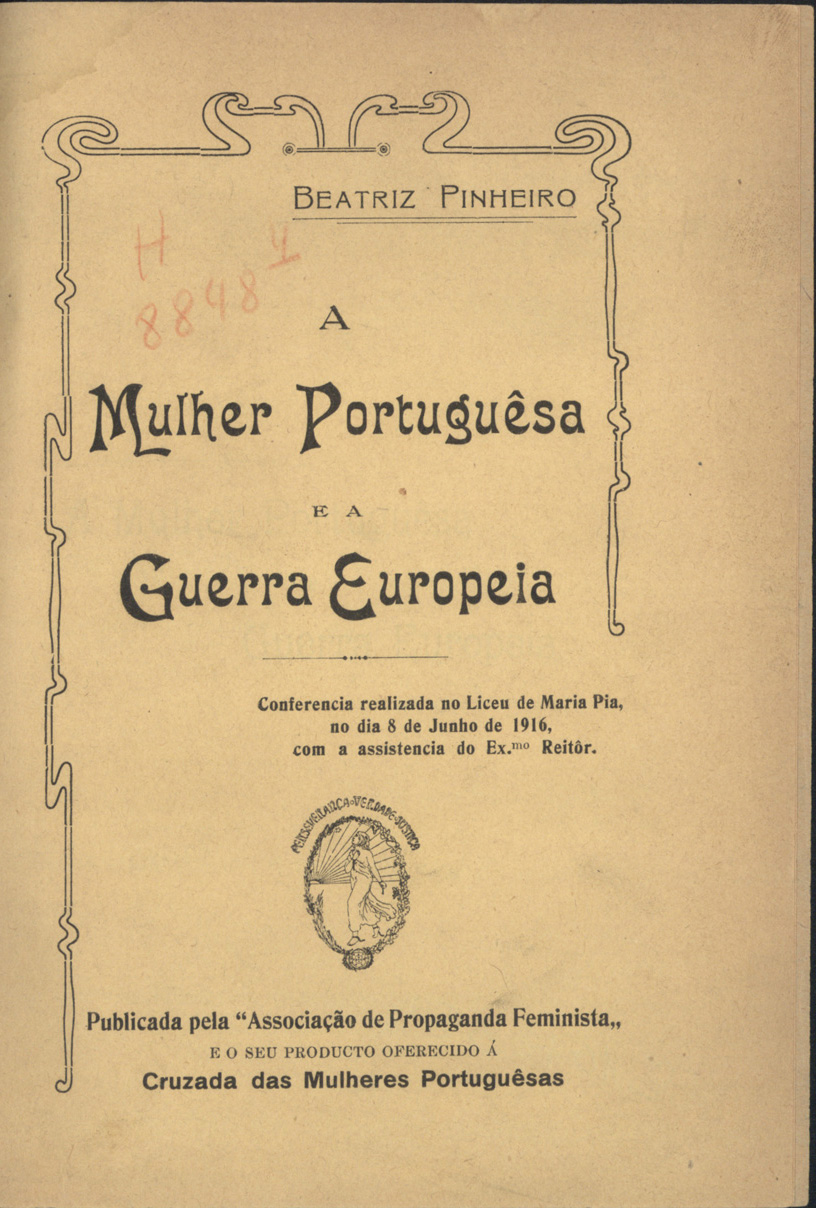
Portuguese Women and the European War - 1916

Pinheiro was born in Viseu in central Portugal in 1871.

She and the poet Carlos de Lemos published an arts magazine in Viseu named Ave Azul ("Bluebird") which ran for twelve issues in 1899 and 1900. In the magazine they published revolutionary ideas about the rights of women. They thought that a woman should be able to create a dignified life for herself without the need of a man. She called on readers to champion the rights of women to compete in education on an equal footing with men and to gain their right to equal civil and political equality. She lauded Alice Pestana's Portuguese League for Peace founded in 1899. Pinheiro believed that educated women could contribute to creating world peace. These were revolutionary ideas. Pestana was also publishing her ideas but under a nom de plume of Cil in the newspaper Vanguardia.

She became the representative of the Portuguese League for Peace and she used her writing to further its republican ideals in Viseu. She wrote for A Beira, Almanaque de Senhoras, Alma feminina or A Crónica. In time she and Carlos found it better to move to Lisbon. When the Republic was formed, on October 5, 1910, Beatriz Pinheiro was in Lisbon, participating in the campaign to approve the Divorce Law. In June 1913, she, Ana Augusta de Castilho, Ana de Castro Osório, Luthgarda de Caires, Joana de Almeida Nogueira and Maria Veleda were part of the Portuguese delegation at the Seventh Conference of the International Woman Suffrage Alliance in Budapest.

During the First World War on 8 June 1916 she held a conference at Liceu Maria Pia where she was teaching. As a result she published A Mulher Portuguêsa e a Guerra Europeia (Portuguese Women and the European War). This was a defining moment as Pinheiro who was a known pacifist and radical, defended Portugal's participation in World War I.

Pinheiro died in Lisbon in 1922.

== Works ==
- Duas Almas (1912)
- A Mulher Portuguêsa e a Guerra Europeia (1916)
