= Women in Portugal =

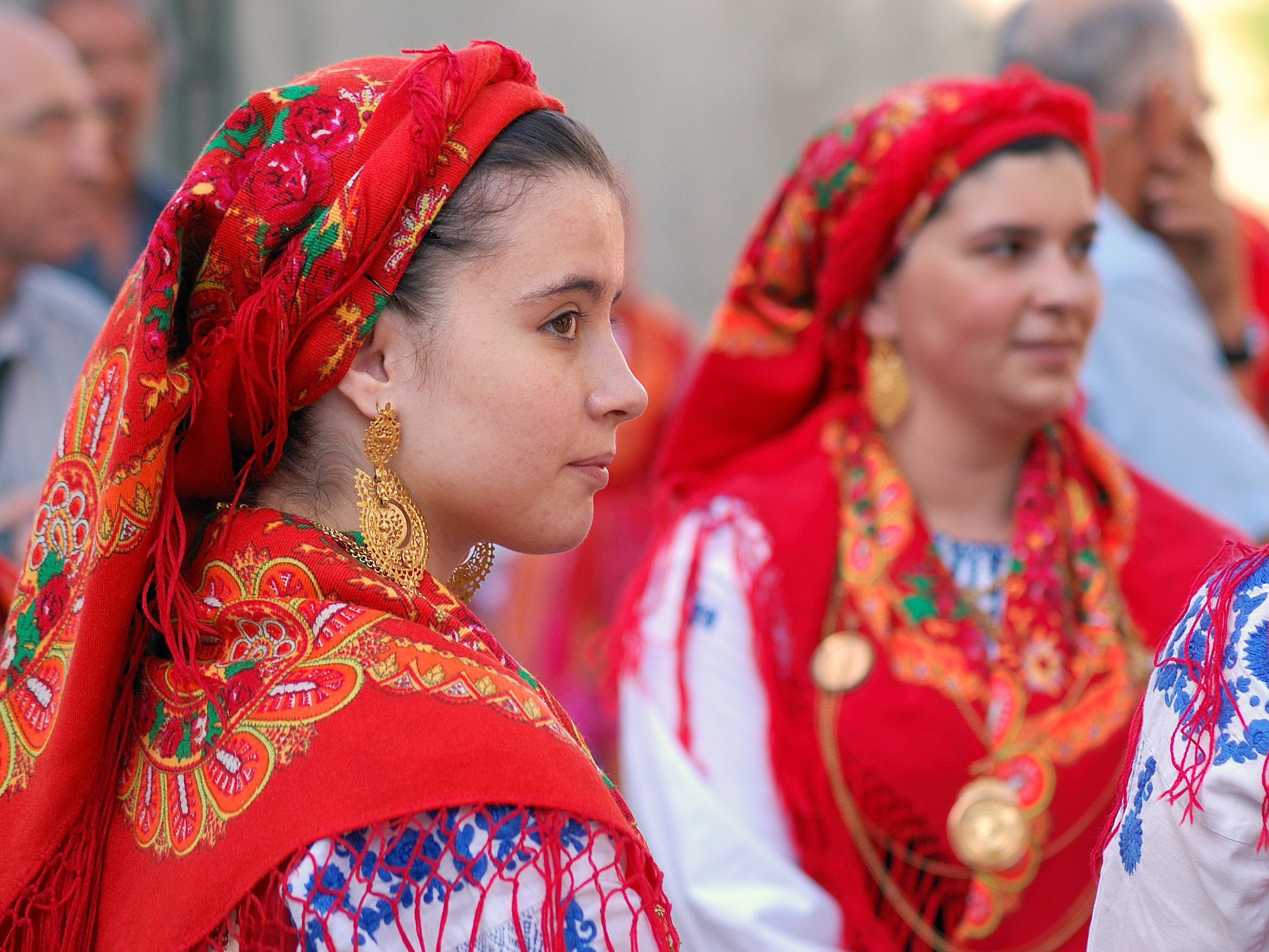
- Two women from Portugal in traditional garb, 2010

General statistics
- Maternal mortality (per 100,000): 8 (2010)
- Women in parliament: 28.7% (2013)
- Women over 25 with secondary education: 47.7% (2012)
- Women in labour force: 66.6% (employment rate OECD definition, 2020)

Gender Inequality Index
- Value: 0.067 (2021)
- Rank: 15th out of 191

Global Gender Gap Index
- Value: 0.766 (2022)
- Rank: 29th out of 146

Women in Portugal received full legal equality with Portuguese men as mandated by Portugal's constitution of 1976, which in turn resulted from the Revolution of 1974. Women were allowed to vote for the first time in Portugal in 1931 under Salazar's Estado Novo, but not on equal terms with men. The right for women to vote was later broadened twice under the Estado Novo. The first time was in 1946 and the second time in 1968 under Marcelo Caetano, law 2137 proclaimed the equality of men and women for electoral purposes. By the early part of the 1990s, many women of Portugal became professionals, including being medical doctors and lawyers, a leap from many being merely office employees and factory workers.

== Early history ==
The social and religious mores and norms effecting the perception of women's behavior depended on the woman's social class, not only in terms of the expectations society had of them, but because their autonomy and ability to make choices, the legal protections and dignity privilege afforded, and access to education was not available for all women. The inequality in society was not only between men and women, but also among women of differing social and economic status. These matters took their place in the social discourse beginning only in the early 1700s, and there is little evidence that the "debate on women" (French: querelle des femmes, as it is called in Europe) occupied a significant role in the public consciousness prior to the 18th century.

== First Portuguese Republic ==
The women's movement is considered to have started with the establishment of the Conselho Nacional das Mulheres Portuguesas, which was founded in 1914 during the First Portuguese Republic.

The electoral rule of the Portuguese Republic stated the right to vote for "Portuguese citizens over 21 years of age who could read and write and were heads of families" without specifying gender. Carolina Beatriz Ângelo took advantage of the ambiguity of the law and used it to exercise her vote. She was a head of her family with a child and knew how to read and write, so she became the first woman to vote in Portugal. The Republican Regime did not want women to vote and swiftly changed the law. In 1913, the laws were changed to include gender and to specifically deny women the right to vote. The Afonso Costa's Electoral Code of 1913 sealed off the loophole that had allowed Carolina Beatriz Ângelo, to vote in 1911. Portuguese women would have to wait under 1931 when under Salazar they were given the right to vote in Portugal provided they had completed secondary education.

== Estado Novo regime (1933-1974) ==
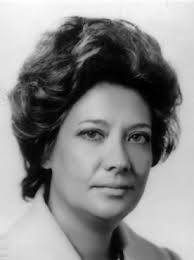
Maria Teresa Cárcomo Lobo, a politician and jurist, became the first woman to hold office in Portugal

During the Estado Novo, an authoritarian political regime which was in place in Portugal from 1933 to 1974, women's rights were still restricted.

In the 1933 Portuguese constitutional referendum women were allowed to vote for the first time in Portugal. The women's right to vote had not been obtained during the First Republic, despite feminist claims – however secondary education was a requirement for their suffrage, while men needed only to be able to read and write.

The right for women to vote was later broadened twice under the Estado Novo. The first time was in 1946 and the second time in 1968 under Marcelo Caetano, law 2137 proclaimed the equality of men and women for electoral purposes. The 1968 electoral law did not make any distinction between men and women, though the general rule to be able to read resulted in systemic limitations for women to vote until 1976.

It was also under the Estado Novo that Maria Teresa Cárcomo Lobo politician and jurist, became the first woman to hold office in Portugal. She was also deputy of the Assembleia Nacional of the First Portuguese Republic, during the XI legislature.

== Family life ==
As a country where the predominant religion is Roman Catholicism, Portugal has traditionally been conservative with regards to family life. Divorce was legalized in 1975. Adultery was decriminalized in 1982. Divorce laws were overhauled in October 2008, when a new divorce law liberalized the process (see Divorce law in Portugal). In the 21st century, family dynamics have become more liberal, with cohabitation growing in popularity, and the link between fertility and marriage decreasing. In 2024, 59.24% of births were to unmarried women. Like most Western countries, Portugal has to deal with low fertility levels: the country has experienced a sub-replacement fertility rate since the 1980s, with the country having a fertility rate of 1.4 children per woman in 2024.

The average age at first marriage in 2021 was 34.3 years for men and 32.9 years for women. Cohabitants have rights under laws dealing with de facto unions in Portugal.

== Abortion ==
Abortion laws in Portugal were liberalized on 10 April 2007, after the 2007 Portuguese abortion referendum. Abortion can be performed on-demand during the first ten weeks of pregnancy, and at later stages only for specific reasons (rape, risk of birth defects, risk to woman's health). However, obtaining a legal abortion is often difficult in practice, because many doctors refuse to perform abortions (which they are allowed to do under a conscientious objection clause) as Portugal remains a country where the Catholic tradition has a significant influence.

== Health ==
The maternal mortality rate in Portugal is 8.00 deaths/100,000 live births (as of 2010). This is low by global standards, but is still higher than many other Western countries. Portugal's HIV/AIDS rate is, at 0.6% of adults (aged 15–49), one of the highest in Europe. Since 2001, immigrants in Portugal are entitled to free health care, including free care during pregnancy and postnatal period, as well as use of family planning facilities.

== Education ==
The literacy rate is now higher for women compared to men: the literacy rate is 96% for females (aged 15 or older), while for males it is 95%. In the 19th century it was much worse. The first women in Portugal concerned with women's subordinate status and in improving their educational opportunities included Carolina Michaëlis de Vasconcelos, Alice Pestana, Alice Moderno, Antónia Pusich and Guiomar Torrezão. Francisca Wood is credited with creating the first feminist newspaper in Portugal and she realised that many women were not interested in equality but she blamed their lack of ambition on the unavailability of education to women.

== Domestic violence ==
Domestic violence is illegal in Portugal. It is specifically addressed by Article 152 of the Criminal Code of Portugal. The article, which has been amended several times throughout the years, reads: "Whoever, whether in a repetitive manner or not, inflicts physical or mental maltreatment, including bodily punishments, deprivation of liberty and sexual abuses: a) On the spouse or ex-spouse; b) On a person of the same or another gender with whom the offender maintains or has maintained a union, even if without cohabitation; c) On a progenitor of a common descendant in first degree; or d) On a particularly helpless person by reason of age, disability, disease, pregnancy or economic dependency, who cohabitates with the offender; shall be punished (...)". Portugal has also ratified the Convention on preventing and combating violence against women and domestic violence. Accurate data on violence against women is difficult to obtain, but according to a study published in 2008, 38% of women have experienced physical, psychological and/or sexual violence since the age of 18.

The Portuguese Criminal Code of 1886 provided for a symbolic punishment of only 6 months exile from the district for killing of a spouse or daughter under 21 caught in the act of adultery/premarital sex, as stipulated by article 372. This remained law until the Decree-Law 262/75 of 27 May 1975 repealed article 372 of the Penal Code. Adultery (defined differently for women and men) remained a criminal offense until the new 1982 Criminal Code came into force.

Portugal has the highest percentage in the European Union of women killed by a partner out of the total homicides of women (86% of women who are killed in Portugal are killed by a partner).

== Women in politics ==
Traditionally, in Portugal, as in other countries, politics was considered the domain of men. However, in recent years more women have been involved. As of 2014, 40% of people in parliament were women.

=== Female records in politics ===
- First woman to vote: Carolina Beatriz Ângelo in the 1911 constituent election using a loophole in suffrage laws
- First female MPs: Domitila de Carvalho, Maria Guardiola and Maria Cândida Parreira in the 1934 general election, the first election under the Estado Novo dictatorship.
- First female cabinet member: Teresa Lobo, Under Secretary of State for Health and Assistance (1970–1973)
- First female secretaries of state: Lourdes Belchior and Lourdes Pintasilgo, Secretary of State for Culture and Scientific Research and Secretary of State for Social Security, respectively (May–July 1974).
- First female minister: Lourdes Pintasilgo, Minister of Social Affairs (July–September 1974).
- First female candidates in democratic elections: the candidates in the 1975 constituent election.
- First democratically elected female MPs: the 21 female constituent MPs elected in 1975.
- First female chair of a parliamentary committee: Sophia de Mello Breyner (PS), Chair of the Committee for the Redaction of the Constitution Preamble, 1975.
- First ambassadress: Lourdes Pintasilgo, ambassador of Portugal to UNESCO (1975–1981).
- First female mayors: Alda Santos Victor (Vagos, CDS), Francelina Chambel (Sardoal, PS), Judite Mendes de Abreu (Coimbra, PS), Lurdes Breu (Estarreja, PPD/PSD) and Odete Isabel (Mealhada, PS), elected in 1976.
- First female judge: Ruth Garcês in 1977.
- 'First female judge in the Supreme Court of Justice: Laura Santana Maia
- 'First female vice-president of the Supreme Court of Justice: Maria dos Prazeres Beleza
- First female prime minister: Lourdes Pintasilgo (1979–1980).
- First female leader of a parliamentary group: Isabel Castro, leader of the Greens Group, and Maria José Nogueira Pinto, leader of the People's Party Group.
- First all-female parliamentary group: Greens Group (1995–1999).
- First female speaker of the Parliament: Assunção Esteves, President of the Assembly of the Republic (2011–2015).
- First female speaker of a regional assembly: Ana Luís, President of the Assembly of the Azores (since 2012).
- Longest-serving female MP: Rosa Albernaz, MP for 38 years (1980–2018) for the Socialists.

== See also ==
- Women in Europe
