= Maria Amália Vaz de Carvalho =

Portuguese writer and poet

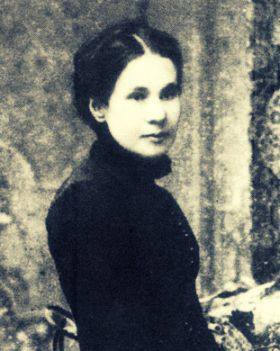
- Born: 1 February 1847; Lisbon, Portugal
- Died: 24 March 1921 (aged 74); Lisbon, Portugal
- Burial place: Prazeres Cemetery
- Other names: Maria de Sucena
- Occupations: Writer and poet
- Spouse: António Cândido Gonçalves Crespo
- Parents: José Vaz de Carvalho (father); Maria Cristina de Almeida e Albuquerque (mother)

Maria Amália Vaz de Carvalho (1 February 1847 – 24 March 1921) was a Portuguese writer and poet. She was the first woman to join the Portuguese Academy of Sciences (Academia das Ciências de Lisboa).

== Life ==
The daughter of José Vaz de Carvalho and Maria Cristina de Almeida e Albuquerque, she was married to the poet António Cândido Gonçalves Crespo.

She wrote for several newspapers in Portugal (Diário Popular, Repórter, Artes e Letras) and Brazil (Jornal do Comércio, Rio de Janeiro), under the pseudonym Maria de Sucena.

As well as poetry, she wrote short stories, essays, biographies, and literary criticism. The collection of stories for children she wrote with her husband, Contos para os nossos filhos (Tales for our Children, 1886) was approved by the Board of Public Instruction for use in schools. She was one of the first women in Portugal who were concerned with women's subordinate status and in particular about improving the educational opportunities for Women in Portugal together with Francisca Wood, Alice Pestana, Carolina Michaëlis de Vasconcelos, Alice Moderno, Angelina Vidal, Antónia Pusich and Guiomar Torrezão.

Her house was the first literary salon in Lisbon; they were hosts to Eça de Queiroz, Camilo Castelo Branco, Ramalho Ortigão and Guerra Junqueiro.

In 1993, the municipality of Loures (where she had lived as a child) established a literary award in her name called the Maria Amália Vaz de Carvalho Prize - Children's Literature (awarded 1937-1961). The 1938 winner was writer Maria Archer.

She died in Lisbon, aged 74, and was buried there in the Prazeres Cemetery.

== Works ==
=== Biographies ===
- Vida do Duque de Palmela D.Pedro de Sousa e Holstein, 1898–1903

=== Short story collections ===
- Contos para os nossos filhos, 1886
- Contos e Fantasias, 1880

=== Literary criticism ===
- Alguns Homens do Meu Tempo, 1889 (
- text at Project Gutenberg)
- Pelo Mundo Fora, 1889 (
- text at Project Gutenberg)
- A Arte de Viver na Sociedade, 1897
- Em Portugal e no Estrangeiro, 1899
- Figuras de Hoje e de Ontem, 1902
- Cérebros e Corações, 1903
- Ao Correr do Tempo, 1906
- Impressões da História, 1911
- Coisas do Século XVIII em Portugal, Coisas de Agora, 1913

=== Education ===
- Mulheres e creanças: nota sobre educação, 1880

=== Essays ===
- Serões no Campo, 1877

=== Poetry ===
- Uma Primavera de Mulher, 1867
- Vozes no Ermo, 1867
