= Angelina Vidal =

Portuguese writer

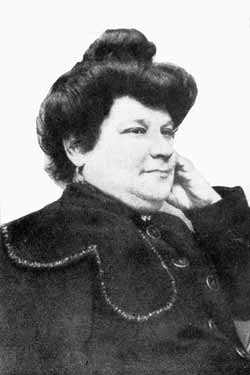
- Born: 1847; São José
- Died: 1917 (aged 69–70); Anjos
- Occupation: writer

Angelina Vidal (1847 – 1917) was a Portuguese writer, editor noted for her support of the republic, women's rights and education for women.

== Life ==
Vidal was born in São José in 1847. Her parents were Joaquim Casimiro Júnior and Rita Adelaide de Jesus. Her father was married to Maria do Carmo Figueiredo and as a result she had a half-sister named Carlota Joaquina da Silva Faria who died in 1913. At the age of nine she was an orphan.

She married in 1872. Her work Death of Satan was published in 1879. After twelve years of her marriage she separated from her husband. Divorce was impossible and her husband gained the custody of their children. In 1886 she published To the Portuguese workers which encouraged workers to campaign for a 12-hour day as at that time the standard working day was 15 hours.

Her husband died in 1894.

In 1901 she faced financial hardship. She had to turn to the charity of tobacco workers. This was not short-term and she had to ask again 1904.

== Death and legacy ==
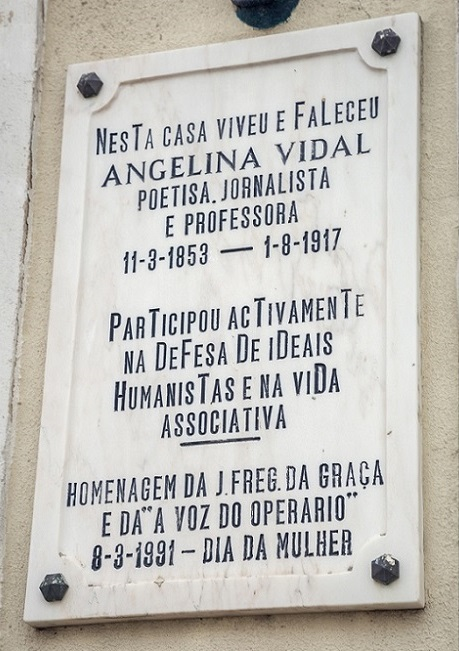
The plaque on Vidal's house

Vidal died in Anjos. A plaque was placed on her house although it is believed that the date on the plaque is wrong. She was one of the first women in Portugal who were concerned with women's subordinate status and in particular about improving the educational opportunities for Women in Portugal together with Francisca Wood, Alice Pestana, Carolina Michaëlis de Vasconcelos, Alice Moderno, Maria Amália Vaz de Carvalho, Antónia Pusich and Guiomar Torrezão. A street is named for her in Lisbon.

== Works ==
=== Publications ===
- Morte de Satan, (1879)
- A Noite do Espírito, (1887)
- Ícaro, (1902)
- Jesus no Templo, (1881)
- Jessa Helfmann às Mães, Lisbon (1881)
- O Marquês de Pombal à luz da Filosofia, Lisbon, (1882)
- O Ultrage. Dedicado ao Major de Quillinan, Lisbon, (1883)
- Folhas Soltas, (1887)
- A Provocação. Carta ao Rei, (1887)
- Arquivo Histórico. Narrativa da Fundação das Cidades e Vilas do Reino e seus Brasões de Armas, (1889)
- Ódio à Inglaterra, (1890)
- Protesto contra a Inglaterra, (1890)
- Justiça aos vencidos, (1890)
- Liquidando... Espirais de Dor, Lisbon, (1894)
- Nas Florestas da Vida, Lisbon, (1906)
- Semana da Paixão, (1906)
- Contos Negros, (1896)
- Lisboa Antiga e Lisboa Moderna. Elementos Históricos da sua Evolução, 3 vols., (1900-1903)
- Os Contos Vermelhos, (1904)
- Contos de Cristal, (1905)
- Evangelho da Instrução, (1907)
- Os Contos Cristalinos, (1907-1908)
- Abecedário do Amor, (1908)
- Avé Charitas! Ao grande coração de luz do ilustre sr. dr. Manuel d'Arriaga, Lisbon, (1912)

=== Plays ===
- O Conselheiro Acácio (drama)
- Nobreza de Alma (drama)
- Lição Moral (drama)
- Caminho Errado (comedy)
- Castigar os que Erram (comedy)
- O Oitavo Mandamento (comedy)

=== Contributions to periodicals ===
- O Alarme
- Alma Feminina
- Anphion
- O Amigo da Infância
- O Arbitrador
- Bocage
- Cabeceirense
- Caixeiro
- Camões
- Capítulo
- Comarca de Arganil
- Comércio de Lisboa
- O Construtor
- Contemporâneo
- Courriers
- "Feminismo" A Crónica, 08/1906
- Democracia do Sul
- Diário Metalúrgico
- Domingo Ilustrado
- Eco Micaelense
- Eco Popular
- Enciclopédia Republicana
- O Estado do Norte
- O Figueirense
- Folha da Tarde
- Folha do Sul
- Gabinete de Repórteres
- A Greve
- Ideia Nova
- Independência
- Liberdade
- Loarense
- A Luz
- Luz do Operário
- Luz e Vida
- Marselhesa
- O Mutualista
- Notícias do Dia
- A Obra
- Oficina
- O País
- Partido Operário
- Partido do Povo
- Portugal
- Porvir
- Produtor
- Protesto Operário: "Primeiro de Maio", 01/05/1892
- Radical
- A Resistência
- Revista Literária e Científica do Século
- Revolução
- O Século
- Sentinela da Fronteira
- Sul do Tejo
- O Tecido
- O Trabalhador
- O Trabalho
- Transmontano
- Tribuna
- Vanguarda
- Viseu Ilustrado
- A Voz do Operário (from | a partir de 1881): "Nilo" 17/08/1902
- Voz do Trabalho
- Vulcão

=== Contributions to almanacs ===
- Almanaque de Lembranças Luso-Brasileiro, 1908
- Almanaque Republicano para 1880
- Almanque a Vitória da República para 1890, 1891, 1892
- Almanaque Socialista para 1897 e 1931
- Almanaque da Crónica
- Almanaque dos Repórteres

== Private life ==
She married Luís Augusto de Campos Vidal, a Navy doctor in 1872. They had five children Julieta Casimiro Vidal (1873-1944), Violet Casimiro Vidal (1874-1916), Antonino Casimiro Vidal (1876-1912), Ema Casimiro Vidal (1879-1884) and Hugo Casimiro Vidal (1886-1940). Her estranged husband died in 1894.
