= Alice Pestana =

Portuguese writer (1860-1929)

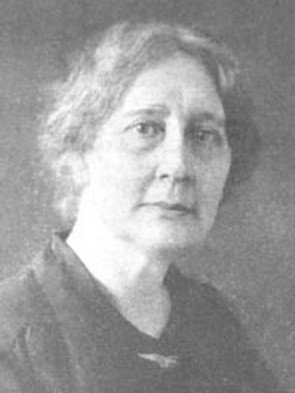
- Born: Maria Evelina Pestana Coelho; 7 April 1860; Santarém, Portugal
- Died: 24 December 1929 (aged 69); Madrid, Kingdom of Spain
- Occupation: Writer
- Writing career
- Pen name: Caiel
- Subjects: Women's education and novels

Alice Pestana or Maria Evelina Pestana Coelho (7 April 1860 – 24 December 1929) was a prolific Portuguese writer. She was the first president of the pacifist organisation Portuguese League for Peace that was founded in 1899.

== Life ==
Pestana was born in the city of Santarém in central Portugal on 7 April 1860. Her parents were Eduardo Augusto Villar Coelho and Matilde Soares Pestana. She was educated well and she studied languages at the National High School of Lisbon where she was taught by women teachers. She learnt about natural history, chemistry and physics and read classic and modern literature. She studied French, Portuguese and English and her first published writing was in English. She used a nom de plume which was usually Caiel.

Pestana was publishing radical ideas about women's education and their rights under a nom de plume in the newspaper Vanguardia. She founded the Portuguese League for Peace on 18 May 1899 and she was the first president of the pacifist organisation. The organisation was formed as a daughter organisation of the Altruism Society which she was a member. That society's motto was "Truth, Justice and Righteousness". She wrote short stories, novels and plays.

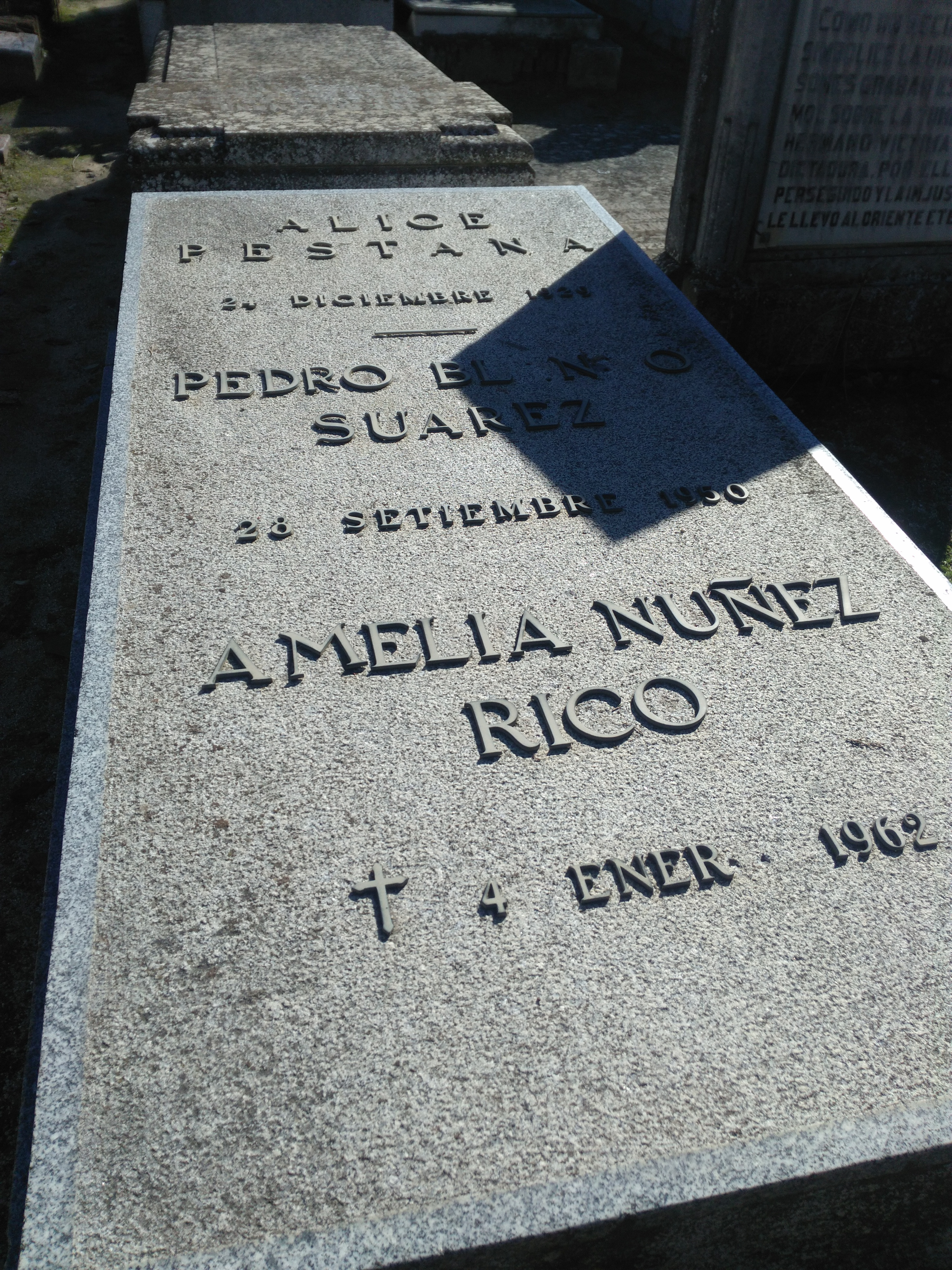
Memorial to Alice Pestana, Pedro Blanco Suárez and Amelia Núñez Rico

She was one of the first women in Portugal who were concerned with women's subordinate status and in particular about improving the educational opportunities for Women in Portugal together with Francisca Wood, Carolina Michaëlis de Vasconcelos, Alice Moderno, Angelina Vidal, Antónia Pusich and Guiomar Torrezão.

She wrote for the Lisbon newspaper, Diário de Notícias. She married a Spaniard and moved to Spain in 1901. She translated Spanish works into Portuguese and published her own novel Desgarrada in 1902.

Pestana died on Christmas Eve 1929 in Madrid. She is buried in the Civil Cemetery in Madrid.

== The Portuguese feminist generation ==
Alice Pestana, among others such as Carolina Michaëlis de Vasconcelos (1851-1925), Adelaide Cabete (1867-1935), Maria Clara Correia Alves (1869-1948), Beatriz Paes Pinheiro de Lemos (1872-1922), Ana de Castro Osório (1872-1935), Albertina Paraíso (1864-1954), Carolina Beatriz Ângelo (1877-1911), Maria Olga Morais Sarmento da Silveira (1881-1948), Virgínia Guerra Quaresma (1882-1973), contributes to a feminist intellectual history in Portugal. This generation of writers is known for a markedly feminist, republican, and socialist profile.

== Private life ==
She married a teacher, Pedro Blanco Suárez, in Lisbon in 1901.

== Works ==
- O Que Deve Ser a Ecucação Secundária da Mulher? (1892)
- Desgarrada (1902).
