= Virgínia Quaresma =

Portuguese journalist (1882-1973)

Virgínia Quaresma OSE
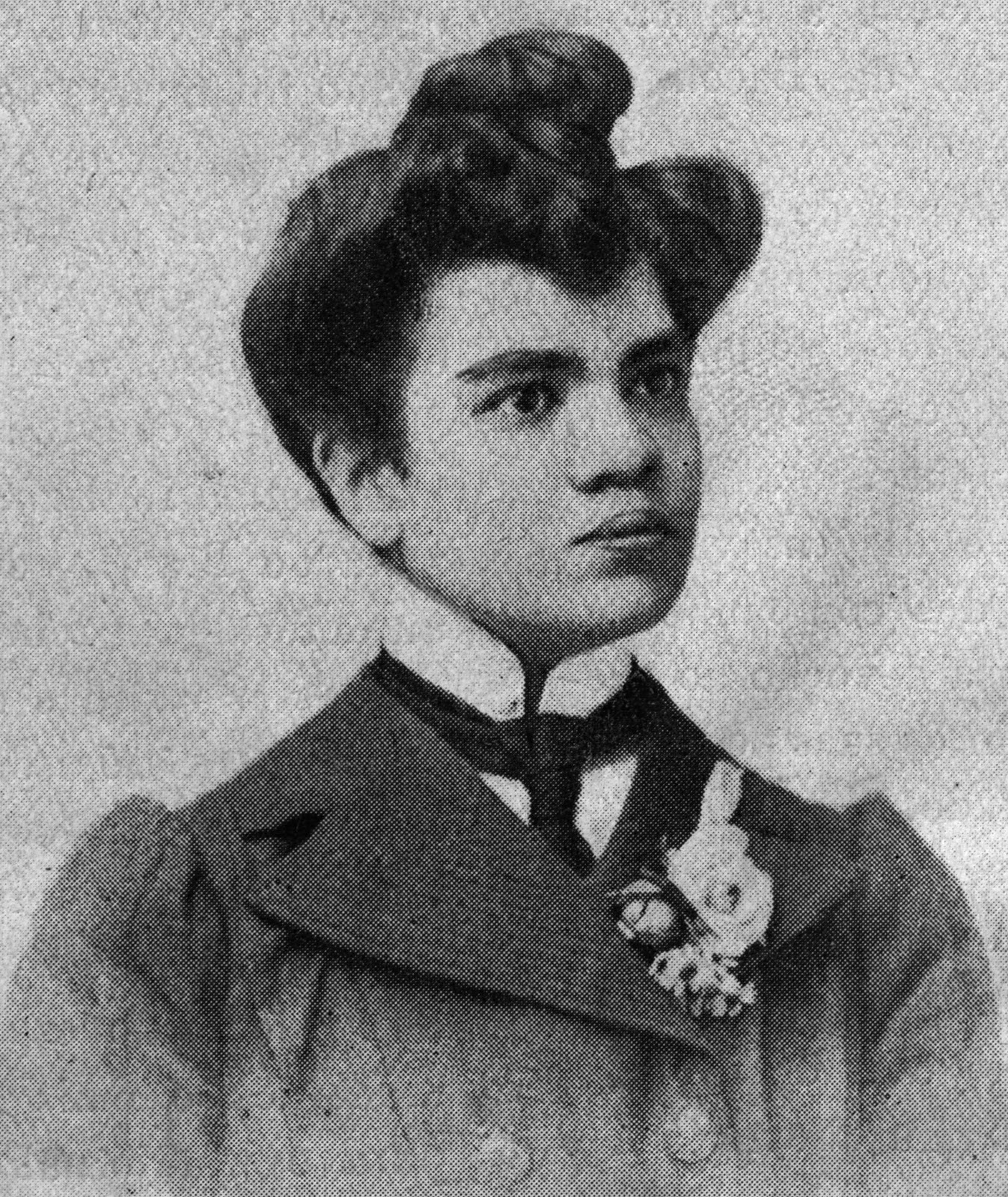
- Quaresma, Almanaque das Senhoras, 1920
- Born: Virgínia Sofia Guerra Quaresma; 28 December 1882; Elvas, Kingdom of Portugal
- Died: 26 October 1973 (aged 90); Lisbon, Portugal
- Occupation: journalist
- Years active: 1903-1960s
- Known for: first professional woman journalist in Portugal

Virgínia Sofia Guerra Quaresma OSE (28 December 1882 – 26 October 1973) was the first woman to take up professional journalism in Portugal and was one of the first women graduates from the Faculty of Arts of the University of Lisbon. She was openly lesbian, in a time when society dictated that sexual orientation be hidden, and a feminist, who advocated for full equality between men and women. In her coverage of a sensational murder case in Brazil, she brought the issue of violence against women to the forefront. In the 1930s, she relocated permanently to Brazil, but traveled internationally with her work. A street was renamed in her honor in the Belém neighborhood of Lisbon, and in 2010, she was honored with a stamp bearing her likeness, along with other women.

== Early life ==
Virgínia Sofia Guerra Quaresma was born on 28 December 1882 in Elvas, Portugal to Ana de Conceição Guerra and General Júlio César Ferreira Quaresma. Her father was a regimental commander and she was the only daughter in the family. She had two brothers, Eduardo and Carlos. She graduated with the credentials for teaching from the First Normal School of Lisbon and then enrolled in the Superior Course of Letters (pt) at the University of Lisbon. Graduating in 1903, she became one of the first women to graduate from the university's Faculty of Arts.

== Career ==
Quaresma, along with Carolina Beatriz Ângelo, Adelaide Cabete, Carolina Michaëlis de Vasconcelos, Alice Pestana, Olga Sarmento da Silveira, among others, were the leading feminists at the turn of the century in Portugal. Beginning her career in feminist journals, such as O Mundo—Jornal da Mulher, she contributed articles discussing women's total equality and the pacifist movement. She argued for equal rights in all arenas: access to professions, administration of property, education, equal pay, freedom of decisions, full legal and civil authority (including adoption, divorce, guardianship of children), the right to work for married women, as well as the right to vote. Quaresma was the principal editor of the journal Sociedade Futura (Future Society) and on 18 May 1906, she reported on Sarmento da Silveira's presentation on the Feminist Problem. That work spurred women to organize the Feminist Section of the Portuguese League of Peace (Portuguese: Secção Feminista da Liga Portuguesa da Paz), and by December Quaresma was heading the organizational committee. Quaresma was the editor-in-chief of the feminist journal, Alma Feminina (Feminine Soul), from the middle of 1907 to the early part of 1908 and then at the invitation of Manuel Guimarães went to work at O Século (The Century) to primarily cover political events.

In an article, "Feminine Solidarity", published 26 April 1907, Quaresma condemned the cloistered life most Portuguese women were forced to lead and argued that the country had an obligation to improve the situation of women. Though in favor of the development of the Portuguese Republic, she approached the argument for Republicanism in feminist terms, arguing in the General Assembly of the Republican League of Portuguese Women for passage of the Divorce Law in 1909, and in 1910 for the economic independence and education of women. In 1910, when Manuel Guimarães left O Século, to found A Capital (The Capital), he encouraged Quaresma to follow him there. She accepted the new post, covering the most important happenings along with her colleague Hermano Neves. These two newspapers were the most important papers in the capital city at the time, and Quaresma used the platform to argue for coeducational schooling, a radical topic at the time. She also recognized the importance of marketing and used her newspaper contacts to create the first advertising agency to be run by a woman, one of the few such agencies in the country at the time.

In 1912, Quaresma decided to ply her trade as a journalist in Brazil. In September of that year, she moved to Rio de Janeiro with her partner, Maria da Cunha, for whom she also secured employment with the newspaper, A Época, which eventually hired her. In December of that year, Quaresma began covering the femicide of Anita Levy by her husband, the well-known poet, João Barreto. Quaresma not only reported the details of the crime, by following the police investigation and trial, but she framed the story in feminist terms, discussing the violence, Barreto's alcoholism and jealousy, and the lack of legal protection for women from violence. In part thanks to a pressure campaign by the press, Barreto was tried in June 1913, convicted, and sentenced to 21 years, although he would be acquitted in two subsequent retrials. Shortly after the first acquittal, which came in March 1915, Quaresma returned to Portugal, where she rejoined A Capital.

Soon after returning to Lisbon, around 1922, Óscar de Carvalho Azevedo, whom she had known in Brazil, asked Quaresma to head a new organization which focused on presenting news going on in the Americas to Portuguese audiences. She accepted the post, becoming the director of the American News Agency. She openly had lesbian relationships, living for many years at the Hotel Palace and maintaining a relationship with Maria Torres. Homophobia in Portugal was severe and the new fascist state of the First Republic imposed harsh penalties for any kind of subversive behavior. Gays were routinely arrested and imprisoned, with their families and friends also facing repercussions. Fearing that she would encounter problems since Quaresma had hired her to work for the Agency, family members of Maria Lamas encouraged Lamas to quit her first journalism position. When her relationship ended, Quaresma began a lifelong partnership with the widow of a fellow journalist known only as "Madame Silva Passos".

In addition to her reporting, Quaresma organized events to spur Luso-Brazilian cooperation. In 1923, she organized the visit of President António José de Almeida for a Brazilian exhibition and in 1933, organized the Rio de Janeiro Trade Demonstration Exposition centennial celebration. The latter event hosted conferences, concerts and recitations as well as documentaries, during the "Portuguese Week" of the fair. After the fair was over Quaresma relocated permanently in Brazil with her partner. During World War II, she utilized her connections with the Agency to support the charitable organization Portuguese Women's Crusade with aid for disabled veterans, orphans and widows. After the war ended, Quaresma hosted cultural programs, featuring young musicians and literary figures, giving many young artists their first steps to fame. For the next thirty years, she traveled throughout the world practicing her craft with Silva Passos, who died in the early 1960s, leaving Quaresma bereft and unable to carry out the day to day household tasks that her partner had handled so she could work.

== Death and legacy ==
Quaresma's death was reported on 26 October 1973 in Lisbon, in the newspaper A República. After her death, biographers of Quaresma attempted to erase her lesbian past and the oppressive climate that contributed to her living abroad. Fifteen years after she died, she was honored by the city of Belém, which named a street after her in the Caselas neighborhood. In 2010, the country of Portugal issued a series of stamps to recognize the women who had helped the country to develop at the turn of the 20th century. Along with other women, Quaresma's likeness appeared on the €1.15 stamp.

== Distinctions ==
=== National orders ===
- Officer of the Order of Saint James of the Sword (28 June 1919).
