= Domitila =

Domitila is a given name. Notable people with the name include:

- Domitila Chúngara, Bolivian labor leader and feminist
- Domitila, Marchioness of Santos, Brazilian noblewoman
- Domitila García de Coronado, Cuban writer
- Domitila de Carvalho, one of first three women members of the Portuguese parliament

== See also ==
- Domitila (1996), Nigerian film
