= Carolina Michaëlis de Vasconcelos =

German academic

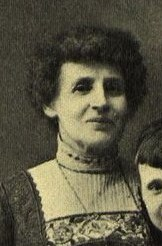
- Born: 15 March 1851; Berlin, Germany
- Died: 16 November 1925 (aged 74); Porto, Portugal
- Resting place: Agramonte Cemetery

Carolina Michaëlis de Vasconcelos, born Karoline Michaelis (15 March 1851 – 18 November 1925) was a German-Portuguese romanist. She was an important figure for feminism in Portugal and the first woman to lecture at a Portuguese university.

== Early life and education ==
Michaëlis was born as the last of five children in Berlin to a prominent protestant family. Her father Gustav Michaelis was a mathematics and physics teacher, who later became a stenography lecturer, while her mother Henriette Louise Lobeck, came from a renowned family of publishers in Berlin. Two of her siblings also gained recognition in the fields of education and literature: her brother, Carl Theodor Michaëlis, became a pedagogue and held high positions in the educational administration during the German Empire, and her sister, Henriette Michaelis, excelled in lexicography, authoring the Michaelis dictionaries in German-Portuguese and Portuguese-German.

She attended Luisenschule a municipal secondary school for women between the ages of seven and sixteen when she displayed a strong ability for language learning. At sixteen, she published her first article in the Archiv für das Studium der neueren Sprachen und Literaturen (Archive for the Study of Modern Languages and Literatures).

After her secondary studies were completed, she was unable to study in German universities as a woman, so she continued to learn classic and romantic literature by herself with some assistance from her previous lecturer Carl Goldbeck. During this period, Michaëlis also initiates her studies of Sanskrit, Slavic and Semitic literature, with the aid of university professors visiting her household.

When she was twenty, she lectured Helene Lange in Latin and Greek, who became a friend of Michaëlis throughout her whole life. Soon after, she started working as a sworn translator and interpreter in legal and political matters for the Berlin Municipality and the Prussian Ministry of Foreign Affairs.

== Academic career ==
During her early career in Berlin she started writing scholarly works for the Brockhaus publishing house in Leipzig, focusing on Spanish and Italian literature. She produced a new edition of the Romancero del Cid and a reedition of the Portuguese epic Os Lusíadas. Her connection to Portugal grew once she started contributing to the Bibliografia Crítica de História e Literatura (Critic Bibliography of History and Literature), where she gained recognition from prominent Portuguese intellectuals. Her exchange with Joaquim de Vasconcelos, a collaborator on the journal and founder of Portuguese art history writing, led to a personal and intellectual relationship, culminating in their marriage in 1876 and her move to Porto.

In 1911, she became the first female professor in Romance studies and German studies, at the Faculdade de Letras at the university of Lisbon. She was one of the first women in Portugal who were concerned with women's subordinate status and in particular about improving the educational opportunities for Women in Portugal together with Francisca Wood, Maria Amália Vaz de Carvalho, Alice Pestana, Alice Moderno, Angelina Vidal, Antónia Pusich and Guiomar Torrezão.

== Death, honours and commemoration ==
Michaëlis de Vasconcelos died in Porto in 18 November 1925, a day later she was buried in the Agramonte cemetery.

Following her death, her name was attributed to a high school in Porto in 1926, which at the time was only attended by women. A station in Porto Metro nearby this high school has also taken the name Carolina Michaelis. Her name has also been chosen for several streets in Portugal and for a street in Berlin (Caroline-Michaelis-Straße).

In 2001 Portugal issued a postage stamp to commemorate her 150th anniversary.

== Works ==
- Poesias de Sá de Miranda, (Poetry of Sá de Miranda), 1885
- História da Literatura Portuguesa, (History of Portuguese Literature), 1897
- A Infanta D. Maria de Portugal e as suas Damas (1521-1577), (The Infanta Maria of Portugal and her Ladies), 1902
- Cancioneiro da Ajuda (2 volumes), (Poetry Anthology of Ajuda) 1904
- Dicionário Etimológico das Línguas Hispânicas, (Etymological Dictionary of Hispanic Languages)
- Estudos sobre o Romanceiro Peninsular: Romances Velhos em Portugal, (Studies on the Peninsular Romanceiro: Old Romances in Portugal)
- As Cem Melhores Poesias Líricas da Língua Portuguesa, (The Hundred Best Lyric Poems of the Portuguese Language ), 1914
- A Saudade Portuguesa, (The Portuguese Nostalgia/Melancholy), 1914
- Notas Vicentinas: Preliminares de uma Edição Crítica das Obras de Gil Vicente, (Vincentian Notes: Preliminaries of a Critical Edition of the Works of Gil Vicente), 1920-1922
- Autos Portugueses de Gil Vicente y de la Escuela Vicentina, 1922
- Mil Provérbios Portugueses (A Thousand Portuguese Proverbs)
