= Francisca de Assis Martins Wood =

Portuguese writer (1802–1900)

- Born: 1802; Lisbon, Portugal
- Died: 1900 (aged 97–98)
- Occupations: newspaper editor and writer
- Known for: "first feminist newspaper in Europe"

Francisca de Assis Martins Wood or Francisca Wood (1802–1900) was a Portuguese writer and editor. Her four-page A Voz Feminina caused international comment with its advocacy of increased women's rights and O Progresso was said to be the first feminist newspaper in Europe.

== Life ==
Wood was born in Lisbon in 1802 and she spent over twenty years in Britain.

She married and returned to Portugal where she and her husband created two titles. Wood is remembered for editing the weekly periodical, A Voz Feminina, for two years. The journal title changed to O Progresso. The four page periodical called for women's suffrage in Portugal caused consternation in conservative England as it reacted to the petition raised by Barbara Leigh Smith Bodichon and presented by John Stuart Mill to the British Parliament in 1866. The periodical was presented as a "‘a hermaphrodite paper" creating comment in the Atheneum, the Bern Journal and the Victoria Magazine. A much later source cites O Progresso as the first feminist newspaper in Europe.

Her first publication carried the strap line, a mulher livre ao lado do homem livre ("the free woman beside the free man") whilst the second wanted "Justice at any cost".

Wood was one of the first women in Portugal who was concerned with women's subordinate status and in particular about improving the educational opportunities for women in Portugal together with Carolina Michaëlis de Vasconcelos, Alice Pestana, Alice Moderno, Angelina Vidal, Antónia Pusich and Guiomar Torrezão. She realised that many women in Portugal were not interested in equality but she blamed their lack of ambition on the unavailability of education to women.
