= Guiomar Torrezão =

Portuguese writer and editor

Guiomar Delphina Torrezão
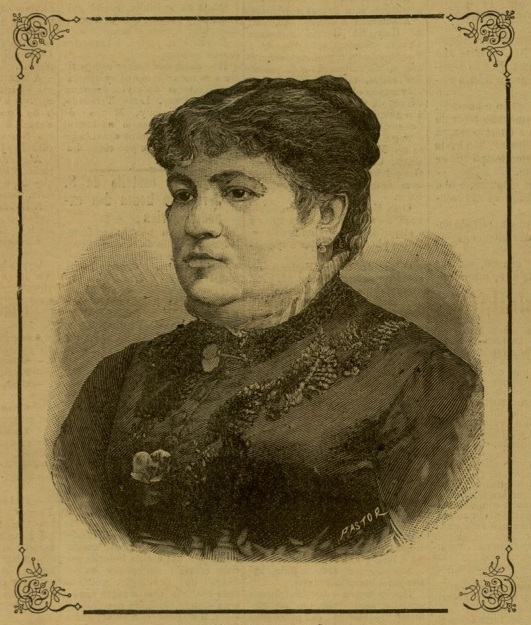
- Portrait of Guiomar Torresão in 1898
- Born: 26 November 1844; Lisbon
- Died: 22 October 1898 (aged 53); Lisbon

Guiomar de Noronha or Guiomar Delphina Torrezão (26 November 1844 – 22 October 1898) was a leading Portuguese writer and editor. She created the magazine Almanach das Senhoras and she was the only woman to be a founding member of the Association of Portuguese Writer and Journalists.

== Life ==
Torrezão was born in Lisbon in 1844. She was the daughter of Joaquim José de Noronha Torrezão and Maria do Carmo Inácia Pinto de Noronha Pinto Torrezão.

She became known for her links to people like Victor Hugo and Alexander Dumas and she contributed to a wide range of newspapers and magazines. She devoted tine to creating biographies for woman in history.

In 1869 she published her first novel, Uma Alma de Mulher. In 1871 she founded the magazine Almanach das Senhoras which she directed until her death

Torrezão contributed to the magazine Ribaltas e Gambiarras (1881), edited by Henrique Zeferino. She wrote under the pseudonym of Delfim de Noronha for the first few issues, but from then on, she began to reveal her true identity in articles and headings. Zeferino's magazine focussed on theatre and literature and was published from January to October in 1881.

She was the first woman to be in the Association of Portuguese Writer and Journalists as one of its founding members in 1880.

She was one of the first women in Portugal who were concerned with women's subordinate status and in particular about improving the educational opportunities for Women in Portugal together with Francisca Wood, Carolina Vasconcelos, Alice Moderno, Angelina Vidal, Antónia Pusich and Alice Pestana.

== Death and legacy ==
Torrezão died in Lisbon in 1898. There is a Rua Guiomar Torresão in Lisbon.
