= Maria Evelina de Sousa =

Portuguese journalist

- Born: 1 January 1879; Ponta Delgada, on São Miguel Island of the Azores, in the Kingdom of Portugal
- Died: 12 February 1946 (aged 67); Ponta Delgada, Second Portuguese Republic
- Other names: Evelina de Sousa
- Occupations: teacher, journalist
- Known for: co-founding the first animal rights organization in the Azores
- Partner: Alice Moderno

Maria Evelina de Sousa (1 January 1879 – 12 February 1946) was a Portuguese educator and journalist who flourished during the early 20th century in Portugal. An active feminist, she participated in the struggles for equal rights for women and was a co-founder of the first animal rights organization in the Azores. Early biographies ignored that she was an open lesbian. In 2017, she was posthumously honored by the government with the Azorean Insignia of Recognition.

== Early life ==
Maria Evelina de Sousa, known as Evelina, was born on 1 January 1879 in Ponta Delgada, on São Miguel Island of the Azores, in the Kingdom of Portugal to Décio de Sousa. She attended the District School of Instruction for the Magisterium, passing her final examinations in seventeen subjects in 1900.

== Career ==
In 1904, de Sousa began teaching at the Santa Clara School and began writing for the newspaper, O Campeão Escolar, which was devoted to educational topics. In 1906, she moved in with Maria Emília Borges de Medeiros and Alice Moderno in a house owned by Borges. Moderno and Borges were friends who had lived together since 1893. De Sousa and Moderno lived openly as a lesbian couple, despite the conservative climate in Portugal at that time. That same year, de Sousa founded the journal Revista Pedagógica, which she would operate and edit for the next decade. The magazine gained official recognition from the Azorean faculty and was influential in academic circles both locally and nationally.

De Sousa was involved in numerous project to improve education on the island. Participating in the school censuses, she reported in 1911 that only a quarter of school-aged children, an average regular attendance of only 150 students, were enrolled in the four available schools and that there were insufficient numbers of trained teachers. She attended conferences and agreed to teach other instructors, free of charge, the Legato-Luazes Method, which was a pedagogical program for reading and writing, developed by Amália Luazes. She also was in favor of the Republican decree which forbade teaching religious doctrine in primary and normal schools. In 1924, she was honored for her efforts to improve education by the First Feminist and Education Congress.

In 1908, de Sousa created the first revolving school library on the island. That same year, she and her partner, Moderno organized the Micaelense Society for the Protection of Animals (Portuguese: Sociedade Micaelense Protetora dos Animais). She was a member of several feminist organizations including the Feminist Propaganda Association, the Republican League of Portuguese Women and the Women's Democratic Propaganda Association. In August 1912, while on a visit in Lisbon, de Sousa and Moderno were honored by the Republican League for their efforts in being the primary agitators for women's rights and education in the Azores.

Beginning in 1915, de Sousa worked on the editorial staff of Folha, a journal which had been founded by Moderno in 1902. She also wrote as a correspondent for the paper Correio dos Açores, publishing poetry and editorials. She retired from teaching on the 13 July 1940, from the Escola Agostinho Machado Bicudo Correia. Throughout the 1940s, she and her partner Moderno, who typically dressed in men's clothing (including hat, tie and walking cane) and smoked cigars, were seen walking their dog around Ponta Delgada.

== Death and legacy ==
De Sousa died on the 12 February 1946 and was buried the following day in the Cemetery of São Joaquim. Moderno lived only eight days after de Sousa's death, dying on 20 February 1946. After the couple's death, biographers attempted to erase the couple's lesbian past and the oppressive political climate that had existed. In 2013, the Ponta Delgada Municipal Assembly passed a decree to add de Sousa's name to the identifying plate on the crypt Moderno had built for their remains. In 2017, she was posthumously honored by the government with the Azorean Insignia of Recognition.
