= Michaelis (dictionary) =

Portuguese dictionary

Michaelis is a brand of dictionaries of the Portuguese language published in Brazil by Melhoramentos. Under this brand are also books about the grammar of a variety of foreign languages. The first Michaelis dictionary was created by the end of the 19th century by the German lexicographer Henriette Michaelis in a partnership with her sister Carolina Michaelis de Vasconcelos. The dictionary has versions in Portuguese, English, Spanish, Italian, French, German, and Japanese.
