= Henriette Michaelis =

Henriette Michaelis (6 July 1849 - † unknown) was a 19th-century German romance philologist and lexicographer. Alongside her sister Carolina Michaëlis de Vasconcelos, Michaelis created the first Michaelis dictionary.

== Biography ==
Michaelis was born in Berlin on 6 July 1849 to Gustav Michaëlis[de] (1813–1895), a physics and mathematics teacher and stenographer, and Henriette Louise Lobeck, who came from a Berlin publishing family. Her siblings include the philologist Carolina Michaëlis de Vasconcelos and the educationalist Carl Theodor Michaëlis. Michaelis published dictionaries of Romance languages.

== The Michaelis dictionary ==
Henriette Michaelis and her sister Carolina Michaëlis de Vasconcelos produced first Michaelis dictionary, published at the end of the 19th century by F. A. Brockhaus AG. Publishing rights were obtained by the Melhoramentos publishing house in 1950s. The Michaelis dictionary was "a huge success throughout the 20th century and remains so in the 21th [sic] century."
