= Maria da Cunha =

Portuguese lesbian poet and journalist

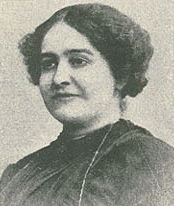
- Born: Maria da Cunha Zorro; 19 October 1872; Lisbon, Portugal
- Died: 10 January 1917 (aged 44); São Paulo, Brazil
- Occupations: journalist, writer, poet
- Known for: Lesbian relationship with journalist Virgínia Quaresma

Maria da Cunha (19 October 1872 — 10 January 1917) was a Portuguese poet and journalist. She is arguably best known for having been the lover of Virgínia Quaresma, the first female professional journalist in Portugal and one of the first Portuguese to be openly lesbian.

== Early life ==
Maria da Cunha Zorro was born in the Portuguese capital of Lisbon on 19 October 1872, to an upper-class family. Her mother was Brazilian, her father Spanish, and her uncle a noted philologist, Cândido de Figueiredo.

== Brazil ==
In 1912, Virgínia Quaresma (1882–1973) was invited to visit Brazil to cover the story of the murder of his wife by a well-known poet. She travelled to Rio de Janeiro with Cunha, her lover, for whom she also secured employment with the newspaper, A Época, which had hired her. The decision of the couple to go to Brazil would have been based on several considerations but it is likely that the homophobic environment in Portugal at the time would have contributed to it. One researcher has concluded that they effectively "went into exile in Brazil, in search of anonymity and freedom to live out their forbidden love". After the case was over Cunha and Quaresma stayed in Brazil.

== Writing and speaking ==
Cunha did translations from French to Portuguese. Inspired to write poetry by Cândido de Figueiredo, she published her first book of poetry, Trindades, in 1909. A Preface written by her friends the writer, Júlio Dantas, and the Count of Monsaraz led to considerable sales and a new version in 1911 with added poems. She continued to publish poetry while in Brazil and wrote for several magazines in Portugal and Brazil. She also became recognised as an excellent lecturer.

== Death ==
Maria da Cunha, died suddenly in São Paulo, where she had been expecting to take up a teaching appointment, on 10 January 1917. Quaresma returned to Portugal shortly after.
