= Maria Guardiola =

Portuguese politician (1895–1987)

- Born: Maria Baptista dos Santos Guardiola; 13 January 1895; Bragança, Portugal
- Died: 27 September 1987 (aged 92); Lisbon, Portugal
- Occupations: Teacher and politician
- Known for: One of first three female members of the Portuguese National Assembly; founder of the Mocidade Portuguesa Feminina

Maria Guardiola (1895–1987) was a Portuguese schoolteacher and politician. A supporter of the right-wing Estado Novo, she was an anti-feminist in charge of the regime's Mocidade Portuguesa Feminina (Female Portuguese Youth) for more than three decades and was one of the first three women in the country’s National Assembly (parliament), being elected in 1934.

== Early life and education ==
Maria Baptista dos Santos Guardiola was born on 13 January 1895 in Bragança, Portugal, the second of six children of António Augusto dos Santos Guardiola, a postal worker, and Maximina Rosa Mendonça. She entered the University of Coimbra in 1914 to study Mathematics, being awarded a scholarship, given the family's meagre income and in light of her top marks on graduating from high school. Her sister, Alice, enrolled at the same university in the same year to study Physical-Chemical Sciences, also receiving a scholarship.

== Teaching career ==
After obtaining her university degree, Maria took a Teacher Training Course and from 1920 taught at high schools in Coimbra, Porto, and the Portuguese capital Lisbon. She was always with her family as her parents and siblings followed her. At the Maria Amália Vaz de Carvalho high school in Lisbon, she served as Rector of the girls’ school from 1928–1946. As a convinced Christian, one of her acts was to install a chapel at the school. Between 1947 and 1957 she was an inspector of high schools. She held many committee positions in the education sector, both before and after her formal retirement, including as a member of the Higher Council for Public Instruction.

== Political career ==
At 40 years of age, Guardiola was invited by the National Union, the sole legal party of the time, to be on the list of candidates for the newly created National Assembly. She was elected as a deputy and held the position between 1935 and 1945. Guardiola, Domitila de Carvalho and Maria Cândida Parreira were the first three female parliamentarians in Portugal, all joining the National Assembly at the same time. Her interventions in the Assembly’s discussions were largely limited to educational topics. She participated in a debate on educational reform in 1936, in which she defended the end of oral exams. She was always a staunch supporter of the orientation of state education by "the principles of moral and Christian doctrine" and successfully changed a draft text in which it was originally stated that education should be secular.

Guardiola was a prominent supporter of the Estado Novo and of the Portuguese leader António de Oliveira Salazar. She was one of the founders of the Obra das Mães pela Educação Nacional (OMEN) (Work of Mothers for National Education), of which she was the Vice-President, despite being single and without children. The objectives of this institution were to stimulate the role of the family in children’s education and "better prepare women and girls for their future maternal, domestic and social duties".

Guardiola was national commissioner of the Mocidade Portuguesa Feminina (MPF) from December 1937 to December 1968 and made contributions to its monthly bulletin on topics such as how to decorate the table, sweeping, and dusting. The emphasis of the MPF was also on a moral and Christian upbringing for young women, preparing them for a life as mothers. Attendance, on Saturday mornings, was mandatory for all girls between 7 and 17. In setting up the MPF, Guardiola and three other women spent several days in Italy in September 1936, to understand how the youth organizations linked to Benito Mussolini's Fascist regime worked. On their return to Lisbon, they made a presentation of the proposed activities, uniform, emblem and training courses for instructors for the MPF, attended by Carneiro Pacheco, the Minister of Public Instruction. She planned the courses given by the MPF, instructing the girls in subjects as different as childcare, cooking, hygiene and patriotic choral singing. Guardiola believed that feminism was an "enemy to fight" and argued that women "were born for the mission entrusted to their sex", i.e. taking care of the home and the husband.

Despite proclaiming a stereotype of the perfect woman as a wife and mother, Guardiola did not marry or have children and was more independent than most women. However, this was not necessarily a contradictory position, as the view of the Estado Novo and the Catholic Church was that young women should be educated by women and there was thus a need to form a female elite to be teachers. It was considered preferable that they were single as otherwise they could have divided loyalties between work and husband.

== Death ==
Maria Guardiola died on 27 September 1987, aged 92.
