= Church of São Martinho de Cedofeita =

Church of Cedofeita
- Church of Saint Martin
- Igreja de Cedofeita
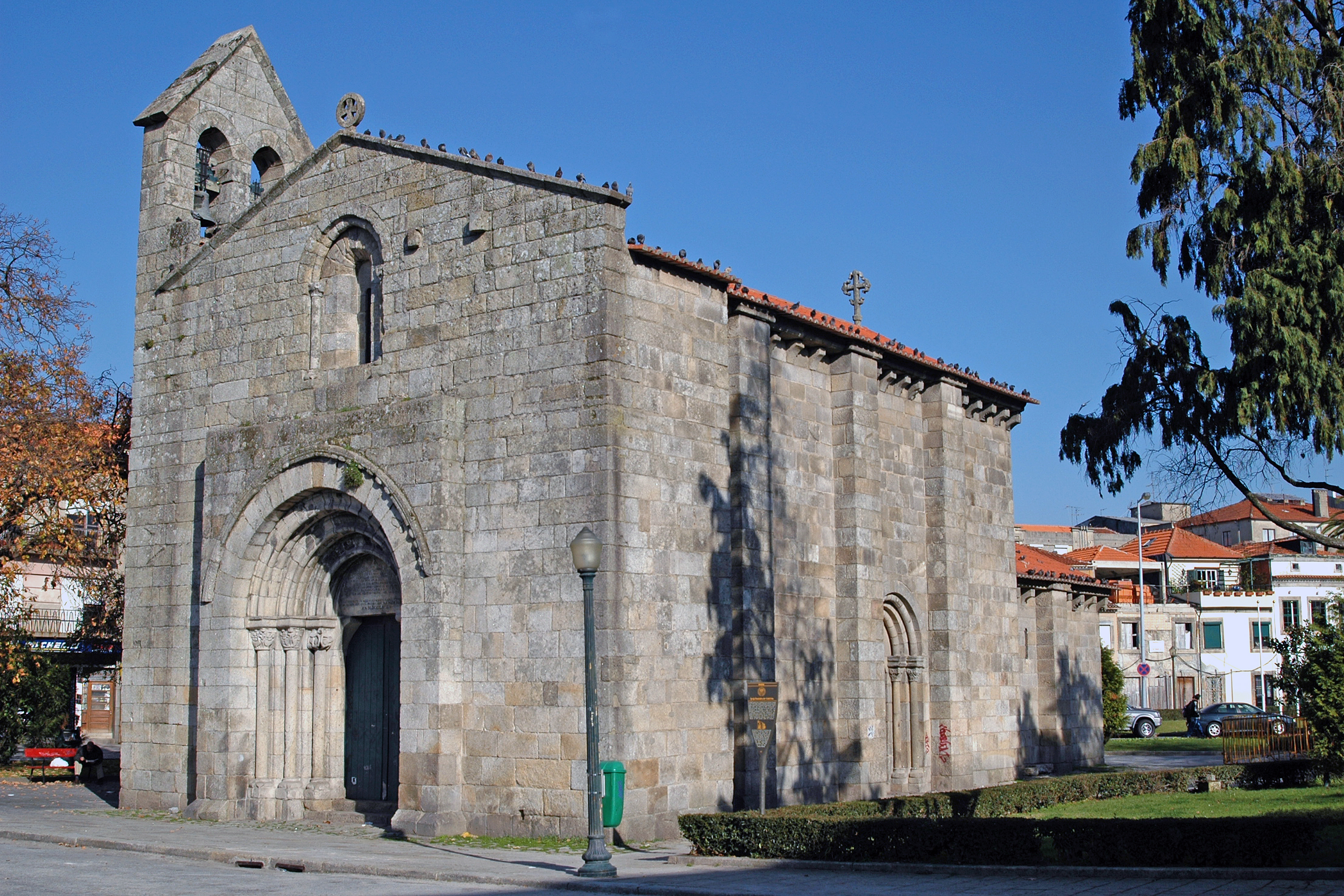
- Oblique profile of the Romanesque church dedicated to Martin of Tours
- Church of Cedofeita
- 41°9′20.85″N 8°37′18.11″W
- Location: Porto, Grande Porto, Norte
- Country: Portugal
- Denomination: Roman Catholic

History
- Dedication: Martin of Tours

Architecture
- Style: Romanesque
- Years built: c. 1087

Specifications
- Length: 11.42 m (37.5 ft)
- Width: 26.32 m (86.4 ft)

Administration
- Diocese: Diocese of Porto

The Church of Cedofeita (Portuguese: Igreja de Cedofeita) is a medieval church in the civil parish of Cedofeita, municipality of Porto, in the northern Grande Porto Subregion of Portugal. The Church is a rare architectural example of a single-nave vaulted-ceiling temple, and the only one in the traditional Entre-Douro-e-Minho Province region of Portugal. It is classified as a National Monument.

== History ==
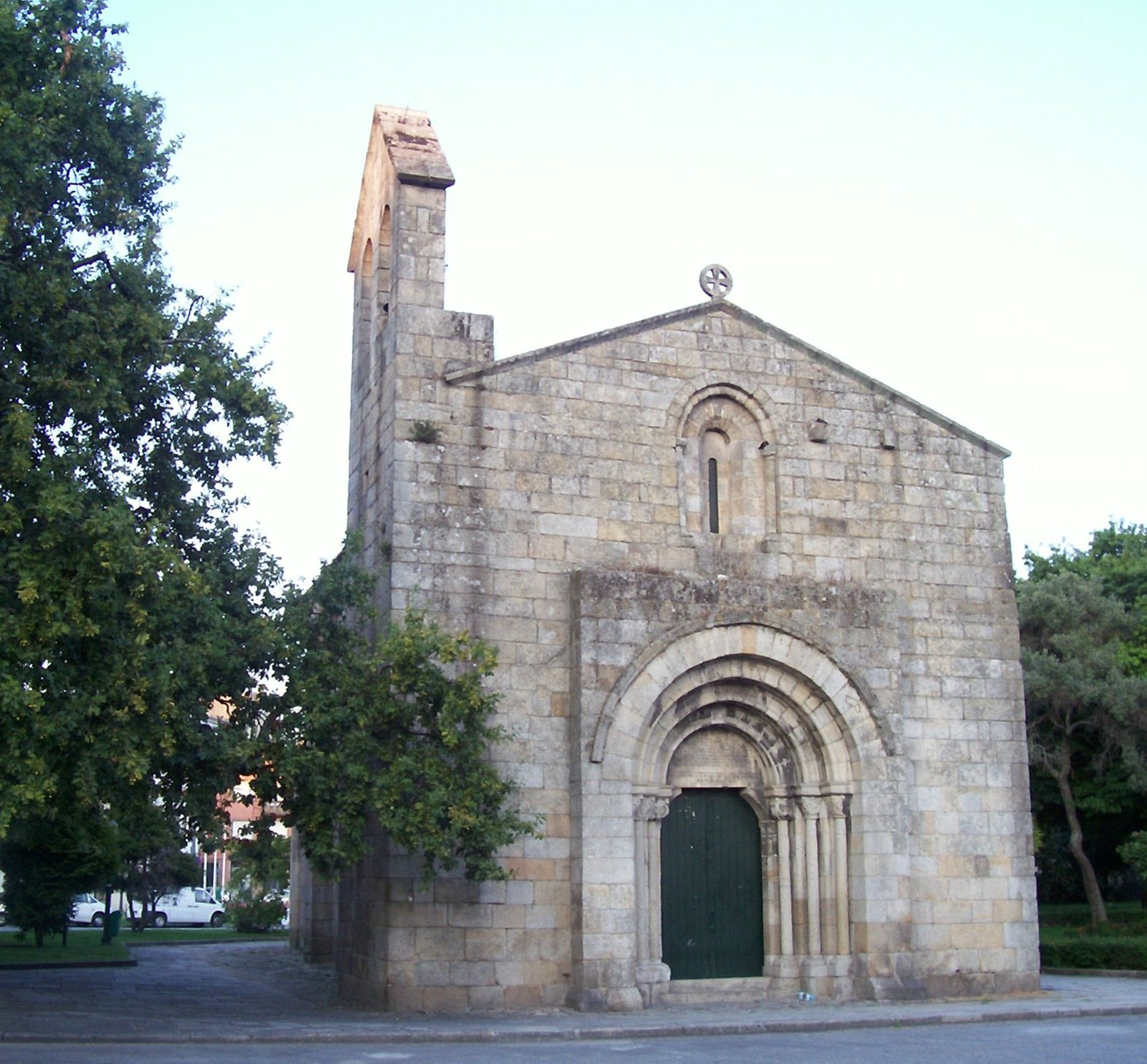
The main facade of the Church of Cedofeita, still maintaining the Romanesque elements and dark granite stone

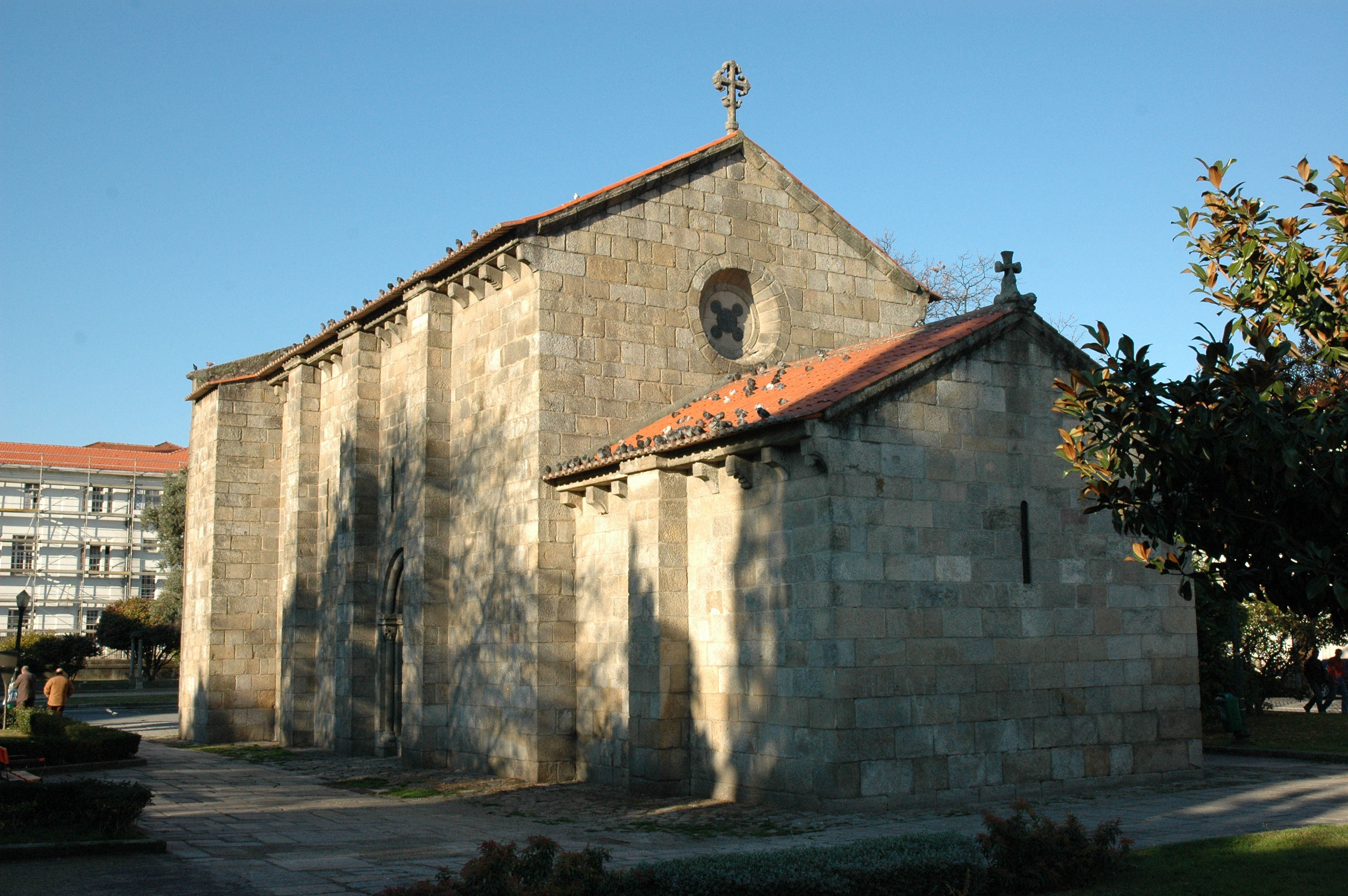
The rear oblique profile of the symmetrical church body

The oldest document referring to the Church dates from 1087, when it was consecrated and funds allocated for its upkeep. From surveys of the building, at least two former structures occupied the same place: one built around the 10th century, from which two Pre-Romanesque capitals are preserved in the interior; and another consecrated in 1098, by the Bishop of Braga, from which the lower part of the main chapel has survived. The more remote vestiges, now preserved, suggest a dating to the late 9th, early 10th century. It has been debated that, following his reconquest of the city of Porto, Vímara Peres, in 868, constructed or rebuilt a temple (whose remaining two triumphal arch capitals were later reused in the Romanesque period). These capitals are one of the most important indicators of constructive dynamics that accompanied the first conquest of the territories along the Douro and stylistically relate to the late-Asturian construction (such as in the churches of São Salvador and Valdediós Priesca, both from the beginning of the tenth century. One of the vestiges of this period was the use of soft limestone (from the region of Coimbra), a fact that contrasts with the widespread use of granite in later public works. In the 11th century construction campaign that followed, supported and consecrated in 1087 by the Bishop of Braga (D. Pedro), included the lower areas of the chancel, whose blind arcades were constructed in a more archaic style.

The truly Romanesque phase actually began late, around the 13th century. A document during the reign of King Afonso II of Portugal mentioned the construction of the building during the reign of Afonso I of Portugal, although archaeological proof of these statements have yet to be discovered on the site. References to Cedofeita continued throughout the 12th and 13th centuries, referring to the existence of a monastery in Cedofeita, alternating with dispatches about a religious college, continuing until the first quarter of the 13th century. The community of religious clerics adopted the orders of the Canons Regular of Saint Augustine; historically, references to the temple referred to a much larger Convento dos Cónegos Regrantes de Santo Agostinho (Convent of the Canons Regular of Saint Augustine).

The religious community was supported by the founding of a factory in the beginning of the 13th century, which helped to develop the parish. By the 16th century, the College of Cedofeita was one of the largest property-owners in the area of Porto, supported by land-rents from the district and donations from the faith community.

Between the 17th and 18th century, the church was remodelled, with the extension of lateral chapels from the fourth section of the nave. The front entranceway was tiled (hiding the original western facade), while a new bell-tower and a southern cloister were built, at the same time the chancel was extended by two metres, while its barrel ceiling was elaborated in stucco. In the middle of the 18th century, the canons at Cedofeita were willing to impose a cost of one Portuguese real on its parishioners in order to rebuild the church.

An inscription was made into the western door tympanum around 1767, stating that the Church was founded in 559 by King Theodemar, and consecrated by the Bishop of Braga, Lucrécio (561–562). Although it was copied from a parchment found in the canon's archives in 1556, the original stone, on which it was based, has never been found.

In 1869, the college of canons was extinguished, although the building continued to function as a parochial church. By 1880, an organ by Peter Conacher was installed in the church.

Formal restoration of the Church began in 1930, and lasted the next five years, under the stewardship of the Direcção Geral dos Edifícios e Monumentos Nacionais (DGMEN), resulting in the identification of several additions to the church during the 17th and 18th century. These renovations removed many of the late Baroque additions and gave it a more "medieval" appearance. It was during these restorations that the organ was disassembled and removed from the Church. Successively, the building was further restored through several periods of renovation, including in 1966, 1975, 1979, 1980, 1982, 1984 (when the chancel roof was re-tiled) and in 1991 (when electricity was introduced into the structure and the roof over the main nave was reconstructed).

== Architecture ==
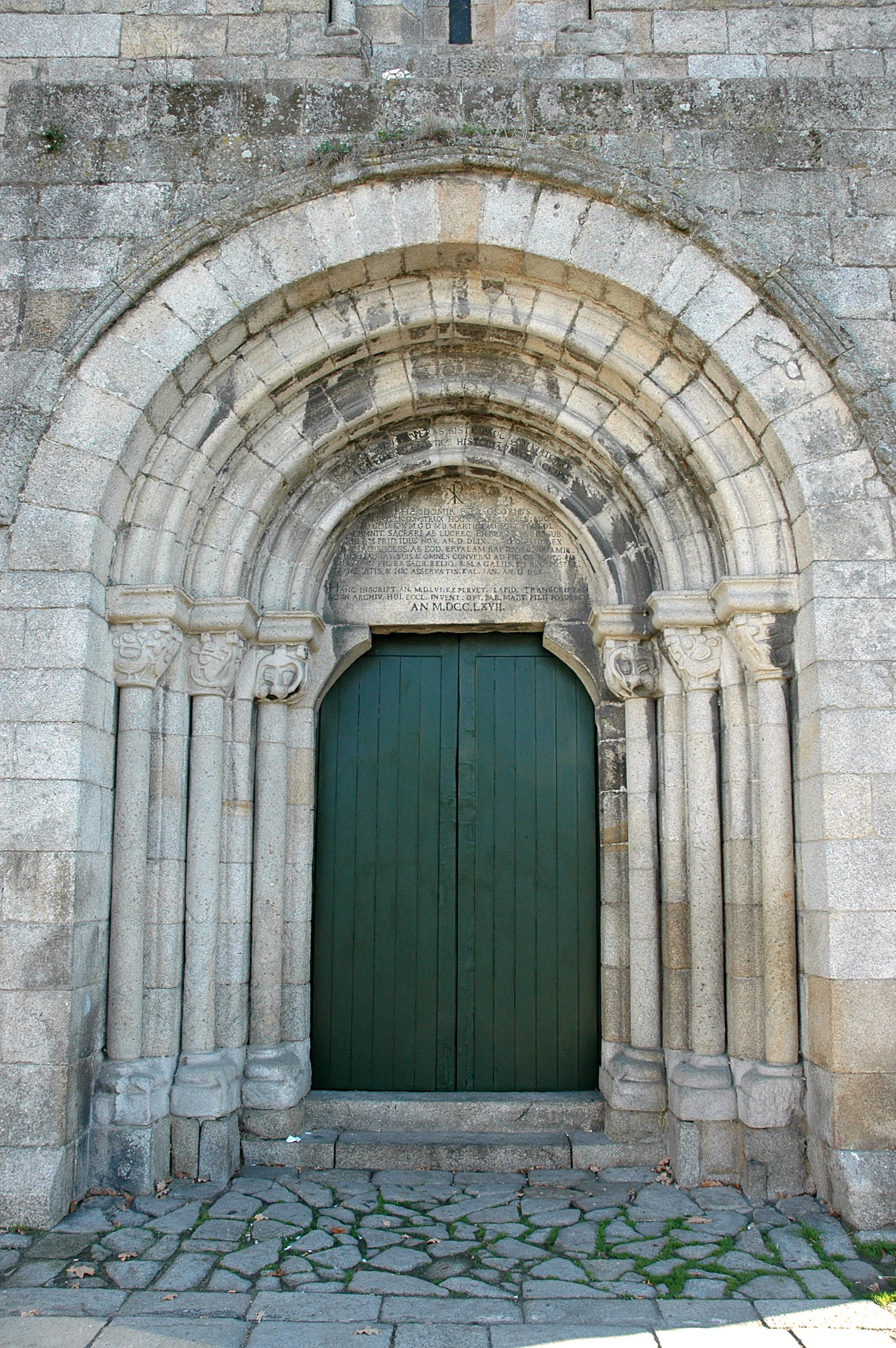
The western entranceway showing the three semi-circular arches and inscription

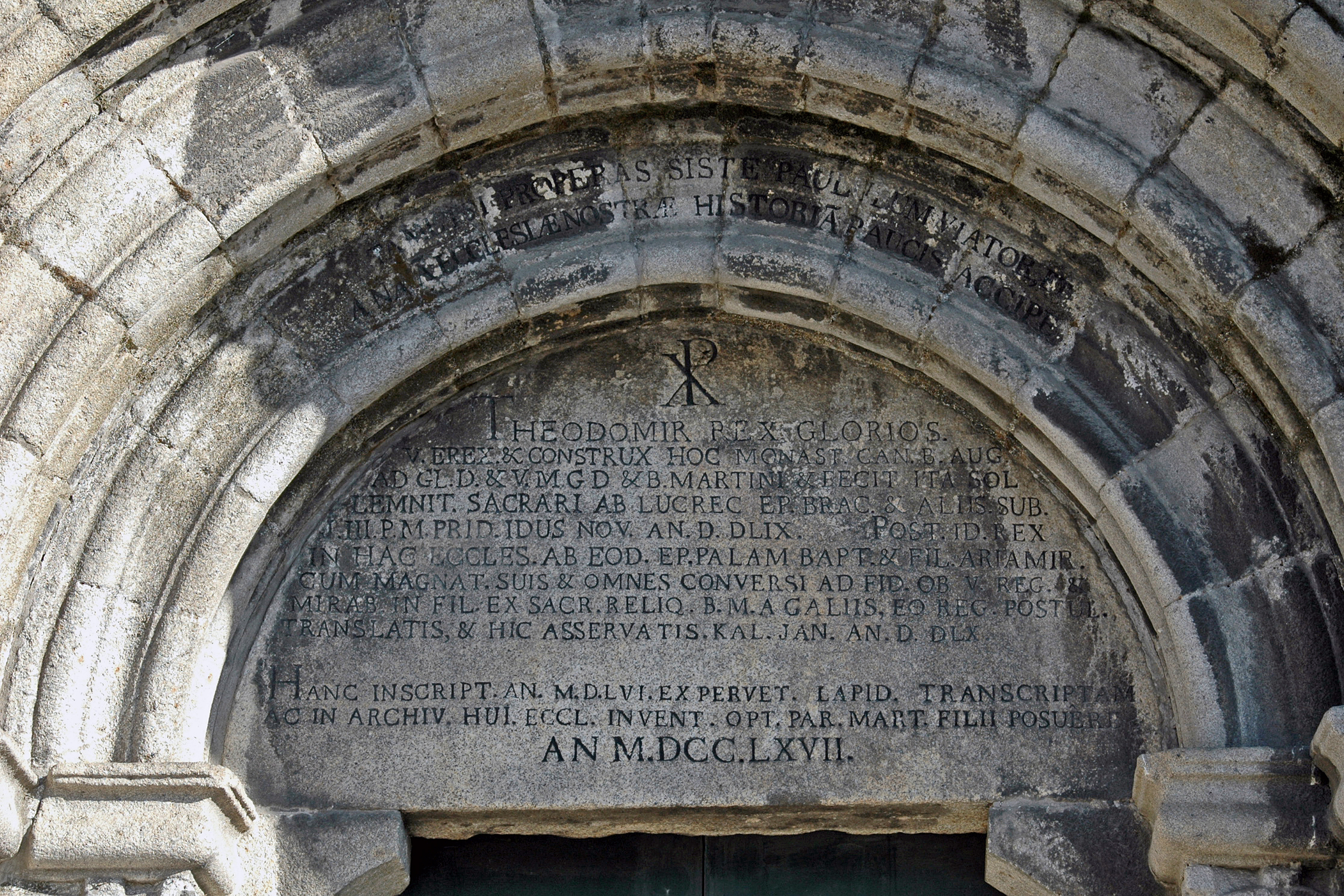
Close-up of the 17th–18th century inscription copied from the original medieval parchment and dating the Church to 559 A.D.

The church is located in the parish seat of Cedofeita, placing it in an urbanized environment with intense traffic, surrounded by a small garden, alongside the newer parochial church of Cedofeita (a church of grand dimensions that was constructed in the 1970s).

Composed of a single nave and rectangular chancel, the structure of the apse church is designed around a barrel vault in articulated spaces covered by a tiled-roof typical in Portugal.

The principal facade (oriented to the west) is marked by a single portico with three semi-circular arches, decorated with animals and birds, supported on rounded-columns. This triumphal arch entrance-way, is constructed over two limestone capitals and has a cubic appearance, extending from the main facade of the church. Many of the decorations are thought to be reused elements from an older building, likely from a Suebi-Visigothic construction (and has been the centre of historical speculation since the 17th century). The triumphal arch is surmounted by a Romanesque slit-window, flanked by rounded capitals, and finally surmounted by a Neolithic cross on its apex. Within the cantilever tympanum there is an inscription dating to 1767.

Over the northern corner of the church is a belfry aligned west-to-east, designed in two Romanesque arches, and holding the bells.

Owing to the barrel ceiling within the nave, the church facades are reinforced with lateral exterior buttresses (some staggered examples are not original to the main building and may have been added in the 17th–18th century). These large buttresses support the lateral facades and are interspersed by cornices. The south facade has a single portico with semi-circular archway, comparable to the principal facade but in a smaller scale (but with four columns on capitals and with bird and flower motifs). Meanwhile, the northern portico has a similar design, but with other motifs on the capitals, and the tympanum is identifiable by a sculpted Agnus Dei.

The main chapel has a series of blind arches on the wall (a remnant from the earlier, 11th-century building) and is illuminated by three narrow windows. Two capitals of the triumphal arch (between the main chapel and the nave) were reused from an ancient building, possibly a 10th-century church in this same spot. These capitals, with sculptured vegetation motifs, are made of sandstone from the Coimbra region, which contrasts with the dark granite of the rest of the building. The nave is illuminated by the narrow windows on the nave and main facade and by a small rose window on the wall over the main chapel. Inserted into the wall is a Gothic inscription. It is likely that intervention of Coimbra sandstone marks the importance of this temple for Art History: the phenomenon that developed from the dispersion of Coimbra's influence into the Romanesque churches can be seen the similarities to buildings such as the Sé and Church of Santiago. The themes used to decorate the capitals reveal a transposition of Coimbran models, such as the use of carved birds, lions, while the tympanum, Agnus Dei and vegetable decoration continue many of the similar treatments.

== Sources ==
- Portugal/1: Europa Romanica, Madrid, Spain: Gerhard N Graf, Ediciones Encuentro, 1987
- DGMEN, ed. (1935), "A Igreja de S. Martinho de Cedofeita", DGMEN Boletim (in Portuguese), Lisbon, Portugal: Direcção Geral dos Edifícios e Monumentos Nacionais
- MOP, ed. (1953), Relatório da Actividade do Ministério no ano de 1952 (in Portuguese), Lisbon, Portugal: Ministério das Obras Públicas
- Tesouros Artísticos de Portugal (in Portuguese), Lisbon, Portugal, 1976, pp. 452–453
- Almeida, Carlos Alberto Ferreira de (1978), Arquitectura Românica de Entre-Douro-e-Minho (in Portuguese), vol. II, Porto, Portugal, pp. 208–211
- Almeida, Carlos Alberto Ferreira de (1986), Introdução à Arquitectura Românica in História da Arte em Portugal (in Portuguese), vol. 3, Lisbon, Portugal, pp. 8–48
- Rosas, Lúcia Maria Cardoso (1985–1986), "A Colegiada de S. Martinho de Cedofeita do Porto", Boletim Municipal de Cultura (in Portuguese) (3ª Série ed.), Penafiel, Portugal
- Valença, Manuel (1990), A Arte Organística em Portugal (in Portuguese), vol. II, Braga, Portugal
- Património Arquitectónico e Arqueológico Classificado, Inventário (in Portuguese), vol. II, Lisbon, Portugal, 1993, p. 68
- Quaresma, Maria Clementina de Carvalho (1995), Inventário Artístico de Portugal. Cidade do Porto (in Portuguese), Lisbon, Portugal
- Real, Manuel Luís (2001), "O Românico português na perspectiva das relações internacionais", Românico em Portugal e na Galiza (in Portuguese), Lisbon, Portugal, pp. 30–48
- Real, Manuel Luís (1984), "Inéditos de arqueologia medieval portuense", Arqueologia (in Portuguese), Lisbon, Portugal, pp. 30–43
- Graf, Gerhard N. (1986), Portugal roman (in Portuguese), vol. 1, Lisbon, Portugal
