= Albertina Paraíso =

Portuguese writer (1864-1954)

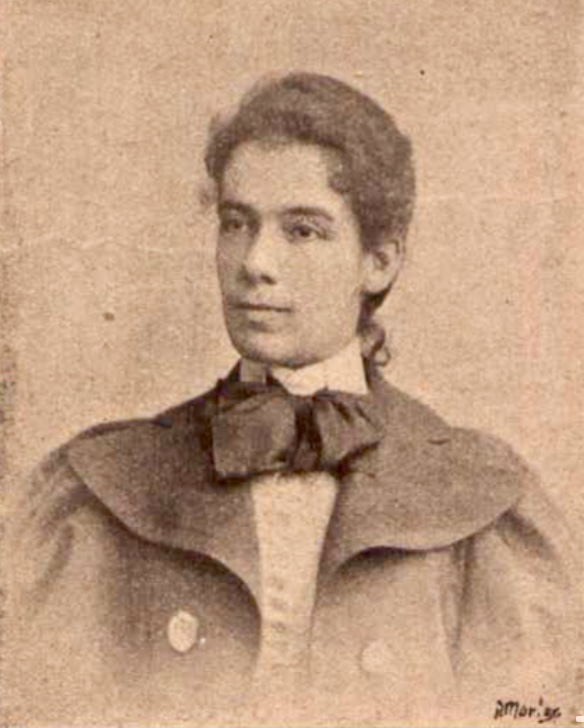
- Born: 11 January 1864; Cedofeita, Porto, Portugal
- Died: 25 February 1954 (aged 90); São Paulo (Lisbon), Portugal
- Occupations: Writer, editor, journalist

Albertina Paraíso (11 January 1864 – 25 February 1954) was a Portuguese feminist activist, writer, journalist, poet, and translator.

== Early life ==
Albertina Paraíso was born into a middle-class family in Cedofeita, Porto. Her father, Guilherme Augusto de Sousa Paraíso, was a bank director, and her mother, Sofia Isilda Freitas de Sousa Paraíso, was a school director. She studied at the Academy of Fine Arts in Porto, where she developed her artistic and literary talents. During her youth, she associated with notable intellectuals of the time, including António Nobre and Joaquim de Araújo.

== Career ==
Albertina Paraíso was deeply involved in political and social causes from an early age. She participated in the 31 January 1891 Republican uprising in Porto and later focused her efforts on advancing women's rights. She founded and directed several influential women's magazines such as:

- Almanaque das Senhoras Portuguesas e Brasileiras (Almanac of Portuguese and Brazilian Ladies), 1885–1887
- Almanaque das Senhoras Portuenses (Almanac of Porto Ladies), 1889
- O Perfume, (The Perfume), 1905
- Alma Feminina (Feminine Soul), 1907–1908
- Jornal da Mulher (Women's Newspaper), 1910–1912

Through these publications, she advocated for women's education and equality while promoting the works of female artists and writers.

In Lisbon, Albertina Paraíso expanded her work to include ethnographic studies. She established a shop selling regional crafts and organized exhibitions to celebrate Portuguese culture. Despite suffering from arteriosclerosis in her later years, she remained active until her death at age 90.
