= António Cândido Gonçalves Crespo =

Portuguese poet

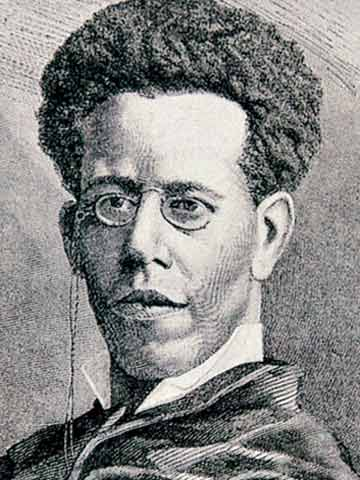
- Born: 11 March 1846; Rio de Janeiro, Empire of Brazil
- Died: 11 June 1883 (aged 37); Lisbon, Kingdom of Portugal
- Education: University of Coimbra
- Occupation: Poet
- Spouse: Maria Amália Vaz de Carvalho
- Writing career
- Literary movement: Parnassianism

António Cândido Gonçalves Crespo (11 March 1846 – 11 June 1883) was a Brazilian-born Portuguese poet.

== Biography ==
Born to a Portuguese father and a slave mother on the outskirts of Rio de Janeiro on 11 March 1846, he moved to Portugal at the age of ten. He was educated at the University of Coimbra, but "devoted himself almost exclusively to the Muses at Lisbon." His poetry was deeply informed by Parnassianism. He occasionally collaborated with his wife Maria Amália Vaz de Carvalho, also a noted writer.

He died in Lisbon on 11 June 1883, aged 37.

== Bibliography ==
- Miniaturas (1870)
- Nocturnos (1882)
- Obras Completas (1887)
