= Cedofeita =

- Civil parish
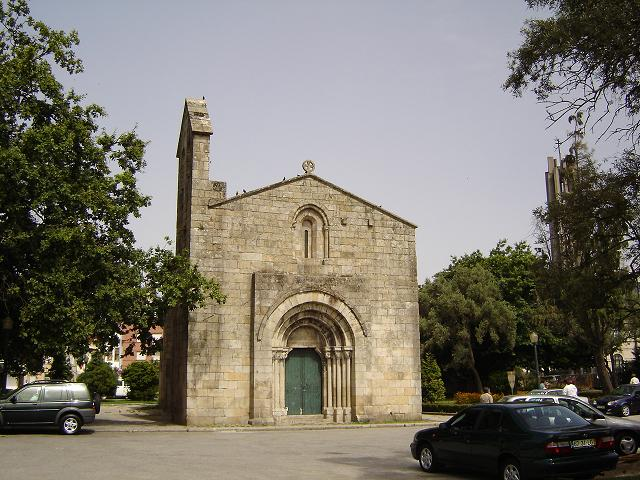
- Main façade of the Church of Cedofeita

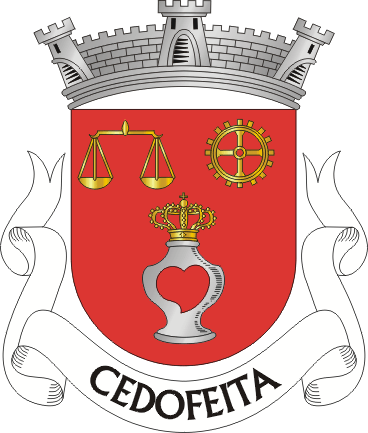
- Coat of arms

- Coordinates: 41.156°N 8.623°W
- Country: Portugal
- Region: Norte
- Metropolitan area: Metropolitan Area of Porto
- District: Porto
- Municipality: Porto
- Disbanded: 2013

Area
  - Total: 2.71 km^{2} (1.05 sq mi)

Population (2011)
  - Total: 22,077
  - Density: 8,150/km^{2} (21,100/sq mi)
- Time zone: UTC+00:00 (WET)
  - Summer (DST): UTC+01:00 (WEST)
- Website: http://www.cedofeita.j-f.org/

Cedofeita (Portuguese pronunciation: [sɨðuˈfɐjtɐ]) is a former civil parish in the municipality of Porto, Portugal. In 2013, the parish merged into the new parish Cedofeita, Santo Ildefonso, Sé, Miragaia, São Nicolau e Vitória. The population in 2011 was 22,077, in an area of 2.71 km^{2} (1.05 sq mi).

Local landmarks include the Church of Cedofeita (dedicated to Saint Martin), the Mouzinho de Albuquerque Plaza, the Oliveira's Fountain, several chapels and modern architecture buildings. Casa da Pedra is located in Cedofeita.

== People ==
- The film director Manoel de Oliveira was born in Cedofeita in 1908.
- Cecília Meireles a member of the Assembly of the Republic of Portugal since 2009, representing the CDS – People's Party (CDS-PP), and a former Secretary of State for Tourism, was born in Cedofeita in 1977
- The racing driver Mário de Araújo Cabral was born in Cedofeita in 1934.
