= Amália Luazes =

Portuguese pedagogue

Amália Luazes Monteiro dos Santos Leite
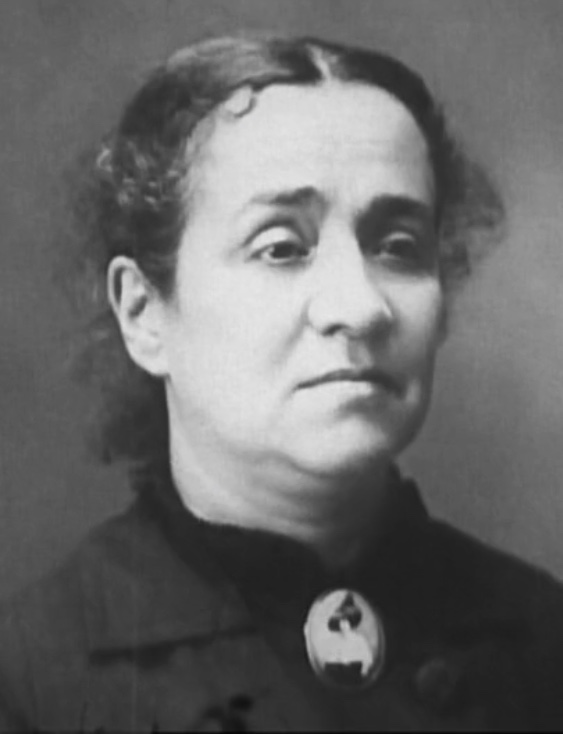
- Born: Amália Luazes; 26 July 1865; Porto, Portugal
- Died: 24 December 1938 (aged 73); Lisbon, Portugal
- Spouse: António Monteiro Leite e Santos
- Children: 2 sons

Amália Luazes Monteiro dos Santos Leite, better known as Amália Luazes, (26 July 1865 —24 December 1938) was a Portuguese teacher, educator, and writer.

== Early life ==
Luazes was born in the parish of Sé in the city of Porto. She was the daughter of José Luazes Pérez, a Spanish businessman and his Portuguese wife, Cacilda Monteiro Leite, who came from Porto.

== Career ==
Luazes graduated from the Escola Normal do Porto (Porto Normal School) and became, on graduation, a primary school teacher at a school in Valença in the Minho Province on the Spanish border. Because of her good grades, she rapidly became part of the primary teaching exam panel in Braga, capital of the province.

In 1890, she moved south to a primary school in Oeiras to the west of the Portuguese capital of Lisbon. The following year she moved to Sacavém to the north of the capital, and in 1895 transferred to Lumiar, to the northwest of Lisbon. From 1901 she taught in Lisbon and in the same year she started to offer free night classes for workers. An active contributor to conferences on teaching, she wrote about women's education and the extinction of illiteracy. In 1910, she was appointed to be a professor at the Escola Normal de Lisboa, where she worked until 1917.

In 1916, Luazes founded the Instituto do Professorado Primário Oficial Português (IPPOC - Institute of Official Portuguese Primary Teachers). She was director of this institute from its foundation until July 1935, when she was legally obliged to retire. In 1926, she also founded a men's section of IPPOC.

== Publications ==
She developed and published a pedagogical program for reading and writing, called the Legato-Luazes Method. Among Luazes' publications was a book called A Escola da Vida (The School of Life), which was purchased by the government to give as an award to students at primary schools. Her books on teaching received prizes at the Independence Centenary International Exposition in Rio de Janeiro in 1922-1923 and at the 1929 Barcelona International Exposition, when she won a silver medal.

== Awards and honours ==
She was awarded the rank of Officer of the Order of Public Instruction in 1931 and also received a medal of merit of the Portuguese Red Cross.

== Family life and death ==
Luazes married Captain António Monteiro Leite e Santos. The marriage was to end in divorce. They had two sons, both of whom joined the army. She died in Lisbon on 24 December 1938, at the age of 73, suffering from arteriosclerosis. She was buried in a family tomb at the Prazeres Cemetery in Lisbon. A street is named after her in Porto and another in Seixal Municipality.
