= Portuguese Red Cross Decorations =

Special set of decorations recognised under Portuguese law

Awarded by Portuguese Red Cross
- Type: Order
- Established: 1921
- Motto: INTER ARMA CARITAS
- Eligibility: Portuguese and foreigners; military and civilian
- Awarded for: Award for services to the Portuguese Red Cross, Red Cross and to humanity
- Status: Currently constituted
- Portuguese Red Cross
- Grades: Grand Cross of Honour; Medal for Distinguished Services; Red Cross of Benefaction; Red Cross of Merit; Red Cross of Dedication; Cross of Exemplary Behaviour; Medal of Honor; Medal of Appreciation

The Portuguese Red Cross Decorations is a special set of decorations recognized under Portuguese law, through the Ministry of Defense, and is intended to distinguish those who have rendered services to the Portuguese Red Cross to humanity.

The current legal framework establishes an eight-tier system, whose titles are awarded under specific conditions.

According to law it is incumbent upon the Portuguese Red Cross's honorary committee to collect of awarding decorations, to prepare and study the respective processes and, prior to the decision of the national president, to issue an opinion on them.

== Grades ==
The decorations include several classes; in decreasing order of seniority, these are:

- Grand Cross of Honour (Placa de Honra)
- Medal for Distinguished Services (Medalha de Serviços Distintos)
  - I Class – Gold Medal for Distinguished Services
  - II Class – Silver Medal for Distinguished Services
- Red Cross of Benefaction (Cruz Vermelha de Benemerência)
- Red Cross of Merit (Cruz Vermelha de Mérito)
- Red Cross of Dedication (Cruz Vermelha de Dedicação)
- Cross of Exemplary Behaviour (Cruz de Comportamento Exemplar)
  - I Class – Gold Cross of Exemplary Behaviour
  - II Class – Silver Cross of Exemplary Behaviour
  - III Class – Copper Cross of Exemplary Behaviour
- Medal of Honor (Medalha de Louvor)
- Medal of Appreciation (Medalha de Agradecimento)

== Awarding criteria and restrictions ==
=== Grand Cross of Honour ===
The Grand Cross of Honour is conferred by right to the honorary presidents of the Portuguese Red Cross and may also be conferred on natural or legal persons who render high and relevant services to the work of the Red Cross, or through it, to humanity. This class is only award once to by the Portuguese Red Cross's national directorship upon advice of the regional delegations' directorships.

=== Medal for Distinguished Services ===
The Medal for Distinguished Services is exclusively award to the employees of Portuguese Red Cross, or to those at its services, and aims to reward the acts practiced in the removal, transport or treatment of patients or injured persons, in situations of armed conflict or in any of the situations related to the prevention and remedying of damage caused by accidents, catastrophes, public calamities, social scourges, epidemics and diseases of high incidence and other disasters or similar accidents and events, as well as the protection and relief of victims affected by them, in accordance with the corresponding national or regional laws and plans.

The awarding of such medal implies that those who practiced the acts above have put their lives at risk in order to save others.

The Medal for Distinguished Services is granted by the national directorship, on its own initiative, or by means of a reasoned proposal issued by the voluntaries units' command.

==== I Class - Gold Medal for Distinguished Services ====
The awarding of the gold medal for Distinguished Services is destined for those who, in the exercise of their duties of direction or leadership, act with such heroism, self-denial or high merit, in any of the situations mentioned in the preceding paragraph, that the honor, prestige and good name of the Red Cross be recognized as exalted.

==== II Class - Silver Medal for Distinguished Services ====
The awarding of the silver medal for Distinguished Services is for the other staff of the Portuguese Red Cross, those at its service, for the practice of the same acts and in the same circumstances.

=== Red Cross of Benefaction ===
This grade of the Portuguese Red Cross Decorations is award to natural or legal persons that for the relevant supports and services rendered to the institution deserve to be considered benevolent.

The Red Cross of Benefaction is granted by the national directorship, on its own initiative or by means of a well-founded proposal from the other management bodies, from the command of the corps of relief units or from the directorates of other voluntary bodies. This grade can be only awarded once.

=== Red Cross of Merit ===
The Red Cross of Merit is granted to natural or legal persons who in a different way collaborate in the work of the Red Cross, spreading the humanitarian principles that characterize it and making them effective.

Like the Red Cross of Benefaction, the Red Cross of Merit is granted by the national directorship, on its own initiative or by means of a well-founded proposal from the other management bodies, from the command of the corps of relief units or from the directorates of other voluntary bodies and can be only awarded once.

=== Red Cross of Dedication ===
The Red Cross of Dedication is attributed to natural or legal persons who provide to the institution, on an ongoing basis, services and supports that involve the voluntary donation of their leisure time or whose measure clearly exceeds the mere fulfillment of their duties.

Such medal is to be awarded by the national directorship, on its own initiative or on a proposal from the other management bodies, of the command of the corps of relief units, of the other directorates of the volunteer corps or of those responsible for the services and sectors.

=== Cross of Exemplary Behavior ===
The Cross of Exemplary Behavior distinguishes the exemplary behavior of the special staff belonging to the emergency relief units. The decoration is awarded by the national directorship, upon proposal of the commands of the relief units.

==== I Class - Gold Cross of Exemplary Behavior ====
The Gold Cross of Exemplary Behavior is to be awarded to those with at least twenty years of service

==== II Class - Silver Cross of Exemplary Behavior ====
The Silver Cross of Exemplary Behavior is to be awarded to those with at least ten years of continuous service or twelve years of interrupted service.

==== III Class - Copper Cross of Exemplary Behavior ====
The Copper class of this award is to those with, at least four years of continuous service or six years of interrupted service.

=== Medal of Honour ===
The Portuguese Red Cross's Medal of Honour is awarded by right to natural or legal persons who have been given a written commendation by the national president or the national directorship, on his own initiative or on a reasoned proposal from his members, from command of the corps of relief units, volunteering, delegation or core departments or for those responsible for services and sectors.

Each recipient may only use a medal of praise, but may, in a ribbon bar, include the number of these decorations awarded to him/her.

=== Medal of Appreciation ===
The Medal of Appreciation is granted to natural or legal persons who spontaneously and unselfishly render meritorious service to the Red Cross or, through it, to humanity.

This decoration is granted by the national directorship, on its own initiative or on a reasoned proposal from his members, from command of the corps of relief units, volunteering, delegation or core departments or for those responsible for services and sectors.

Like with the Medal of Honour, each recipient of the Medal of Appreciation may only use a medal of praise, but may, in a ribbon bar, include the number of these decorations awarded to him/her.
