= Alda Santos Victor =

Portuguese politician (died 2018)

Alda Soares de Melo Cardoso dos Santos Victor
- Born: 1921 or 1922; Aveiro, Portugal
- Died: 22 August 2018 Aged 96; Vagos, Aveiro District
- Occupation: Politician
- Known for: One of first five women to become mayors in Portugal, 1977

Alda Soares de Melo Cardoso dos Santos Victor (born 1921 or 1922) was one of the so-called "Magnificent Five" Portuguese women who were elected in December 1976 as municipal mayors in the first election for mayors in Portugal after the April 1974 Carnation Revolution. She was re-elected on two further occasions.

== Early life ==
Victor was born in Aveiro in 1921 or 1922. She married a magistrate in 1940 and travelled around the country, accompanying him on his various postings for 14 years before moving to the Portuguese capital of Lisbon. The couple had one daughter.

== Political career ==
At the time of the 1976 municipal elections, she received a delegation from the centre-right CDS – People's Party from Vagos, a municipality in the Aveiro District, who asked her to consider running for election as mayor. Their preference was apparently for her husband, who came from the village of Soza in the municipality, but as he had had connections with the Estado Novo regime that had been overthrown by the Carnation Revolution, he was barred from being a candidate. She campaigned very little, had no experience of public speaking and was at home in Lisbon when she found out that she had been elected. Initially, she continued to live in Lisbon, because of her husband's job, commuting to Vagos every week and returning to Lisbon for the weekend.

Victor became one of the so-called "Magnificent Five", the five women who were elected to become mayors in 1976. In addition to her the others were Judite Mendes de Abreu, Francelina Chambel, Lurdes Breu, and Odete Isabel. Like other new mayors she discovered that conditions were very poor in her municipality. In the country as a whole, piped water reached just 28% of the country's homes, only 41% had electricity and 38% had a sewage connection. Victor said that she made sure that she had received money from the government for new works before she issued a contract for the work. That way, she could guarantee payment immediately after the work was completed, which made contractors willing to work for the municipality on future occasions.

She was re-elected in 1979. The CDS – People's Party did not ask her to run in the 1982 election, preferring another candidate, so she joined the People's Monarchist Party (PPM) and was re-elected as that party's candidate.

== Death ==
Victor died in Vagos on 22 August 2018.

A street has been named after her in the village of Soza.
