= Judite Mendes de Abreu =

Portuguese politician and teacher (1916–2007)

- Born: Maria Judite Pinto; 16 February 1916; Figueira da Foz
- Died: 10 May 2007 (aged 90); Coimbra
- Occupation(s): Politician; teacher
- Known for: One of first five women to become mayors in Portugal
- Spouse: Pedro Falcão Mendes de Abreu

Maria Judite Pinto Mendes de Abreu (1916–2007) was one of the first five Portuguese women to be elected as a mayor of a municipality. She served as mayor of Coimbra from 1976 to 1979 and as president of the municipal assembly of the same city from 1983 to 1986. An opponent of the Estado Novo dictatorship, she was a supporter of General Norton de Matos in the 1949 national election and a member of women's and other organizations that campaigned against the government. After the overthrow of the Estado Novo by the 1974 Carnation Revolution, she was active in the court that judged crimes committed by the dictatorship. Among other honours, she was awarded the Portuguese Order of Liberty.

== Early life and education ==
Abreu was born on 16 February 1916, in the parish of São Julião, in Figueira da Foz in the Coimbra District. Daughter of Maurício Augusto Águas Pinto, an industrial trader, and Guilhermina Andrade Pinto, she was born into a wealthy family that opposed the Estado Novo regime. After five years of schooling in Figueira da Foz she entered the José Falcão Secondary School in the centre of Coimbra. At the age of 17 she was admitted to the University of Coimbra, graduating in Germanic literature and law. She married Pedro Falcão Mendes de Abreu in 1940, in Figueira da Foz, and they had two sons. Her husband died in 1960.

== Early activism ==
Between 1944 and 1949 Abreu was active in several areas. She was a supporter of General Norton de Matos who was initially the opposition presidential candidate for the 1949 elections. Matos demanded the right to advertise his message and to monitor the counting of votes, but both were refused and he withdrew his candidature before the election. After the defeat of fascism in World War II the Estado Novo allowed some limited opposition groups in order to appear to give it respectability in other countries. In 1945 she joined the Movement of Democratic Unity (MUD), a quasi-legal opposition group. In 1946 she also joined the feminist Conselho Nacional das Mulheres Portuguesas (National Council of Portuguese Women) and was one of the founders of its Coimbra branch. However, the National Council was closed down by the Estado Novo two years later. In 1952, Abreu became a teacher at a private high school as the government had banned her from teaching in public schools because of her political views. From 1961 she was also managing partner of Teatro Avenida, in Coimbra, sometimes incurring the ire of the government by holding meetings there of the organizations she supported.

Between 1970 and the Carnation Revolution in 1974, Abreu became a member of the National Relief Commission for Political Prisoners, which provided financial and legal support to families of prisoners. After the revolution she joined the National Commission to Support Anti-Fascist Political Refugees, which assisted the many people who had left Portugal during the Estado Novo rule to reintegrate into the society with food, accommodation, medical assistance, employment, information, clothing and school supplies. She also supported the Organizing Committee of the Humberto Delgado Civic Court, between 1977 and 1978, a body created to denounce and judge crimes experienced during the dictatorship and to arrest PIDE (the secret police of the Estado Novo) informants.

== Political career ==
After the Carnation Revolution she became president of the Administrative Committee of Figueira da Foz from October 1974 to December 1976. In December 1976, she was elected president of Coimbra municipality, as an independent on the lists of the Socialist Party, a position she held until December 1979. In doing so, she became one of the so-called "Magnificent Five", the five women who were elected to become mayors in 1976. In addition to Abreu they were Alda Santos Victor, Francelina Chambel, Lurdes Breu, and Odete Isabel.

While in office she was responsible for beginning major works that were to prove decisive for the future of the municipality. She only served one term but then became a councillor between 1980 and 1982. In 1983, she was also the first woman to become president of the Municipal Assembly of Coimbra, a position she held until 1986.

== Death ==
Abreu died in Coimbra on 10 May 2007.

== Awards and honours ==
In 1982 her birth town of Figueira da Foz awarded her the town's medal and made her an honorary citizen. In 1983 she was awarded the Portuguese Order of Liberty by the President of the Republic, António Ramalho Eanes. In 2002, she was awarded the gold medal of Coimbra. In 2022 a room in the Coimbra City Hall was named after her. A street was also named after her in the municipality.
