= Odete Isabel =

Portuguese politician, pharmacist and freemason

- Born: Maria Odete Isabel; 14 July 1940; Cantanhede, Coimbra District, Portugal
- Occupation: Pharmacist
- Years active: 45
- Known for: One of the first five women in Portugal to become mayor of a municipality (1976)

Odete Isabel (born 1940) is a Portuguese former pharmacist and politician, who is also a leading freemason. She was a founder member of the Associação Portuguesa de Farmacêuticos Hospitalares (Portuguese Association of Hospital Pharmacists - APFH) and its president from 1993 to 2002. In 1976 she was one of the first five women, known as "The Magnificent Five", to be elected as mayors of Portuguese municipalities. Isabel was Grand Master of the Grande Loja Feminina de Portugal masonic lodge, between 2010 and 2012 and re-appointed to the position in October 2021.

== Early life and education ==
Maria Odete Isabel was born on 14 July 1940, in Montouro in the parish of Covões, in the municipality of Cantanhede, in Portugal's Coimbra District. When she was very young, her parents moved to Mealhada in the Aveiro District where they worked as fish traders. When she was twelve her parents sent her to be a boarder at a convent school. In 1964 Isabel completed a degree in pharmacy at the Faculty of Pharmacy of the University of Porto. She had originally wanted to train to be a surgeon but a doctor living next door to her family told her that "women did not have the hands to be surgeons", so she agreed to study pharmacy, with her parents promising to buy her a pharmacy in Mealhada from an owner who was close to retirement. Her original plan had been to study at the University of Coimbra but, after deciding to switch to pharmacy, she changed to Porto. She would take further training courses in 1972, on the pharmaceutical industry, and in 1974 on hospital pharmacy.

== Career ==
In 1965 Isabel started working as a hospital pharmacist in the pharmaceutical services of Lisbon's hospitals, where she stayed for around five years. In 1970 she became responsible for promoting, supporting, and coordinating pharmaceutical activity in the hospitals of the Northern Hospital Zone of Portugal. From 1974 she planned and organized the pharmaceutical services of the Coimbra Hospital Centre, which she would direct until 1994 before moving to the Centro Hospitalar e Universitário de Coimbra as director of pharmaceutical services and as a member of the University of Coimbra faculty, teaching courses in pharmacy. In 1990 she was one of the founding members of the Portuguese Association of Hospital Pharmacists (APFH) and was its president between 1993 and 2002. She retired on 25 April 2010.

== Political career ==
Isabel's major political influence was Maria de Lourdes Pintassilgo, Portugal's first and, as of 2024, only woman prime minister. They were friends while members of the Catholic University Youth at the University of Porto. Political parties became possible in Portugal after the Carnation Revolution on 25 April 1974. At the time of the revolution only the Portuguese Communist Party was organised but others were quickly founded and Isabel became a member of the Portuguese Socialist Party (PS). In 1976, despite opposition from her father and many others, who believed that politics was for men only, she stood as a candidate to become mayor of Mealhada, receiving the endorsement of her superior at work only if she agreed to serve just one term, as being a mayor was a full-time job. She campaigned throughout the municipality and was successful, making her one of just five women elected as mayors on 12 December 1976, the others being Alda Santos Victor, Francelina Chambel, Judite Mendes de Abreu and Lurdes Breu. The new PS prime minister, Mário Soares, visited her in Mealhada with a bunch of carnations.

Isabel served a three-year term, which was particularly notable for her development of a network of kindergartens, having noticed the difference between local children and her nephews who went to a kindergarten near Aveiro funded by the Calouste Gulbenkian Foundation. In her job she was a daily victim of sexism, discovering that men did not like to be told what to do by women. She also discovered that the municipality had virtually no resources. At a later stage in her political career she had a falling out with the PS, being expelled from the party in 2003 for having successfully run for the council as an independent in 2001. She would reconcile with the party in 2017.

== Freemasonry ==
In 2000, inspired by her friend, António Arnaut, a writer, politician and freemason, Isabel joined the Grande Loja Feminina de Portugal (Women's Grand Lodge of Portugal), the only masonic lodge for women in the country. She was Grand Master of the lodge between 2010 and 2012 and re-elected to the position in October 2021.

== Honours and awards ==
Isabel received a gold medal for distinguished service from the ministry of health on World Health Day, 2010 and in the same year the Medal of Honour from the Order of Pharmacists in Portugal. A kindergarten, now a primary school, has been named after her in Mealhada.
