= Casa das Águas Férreas =

Residence of Águas Férreas
- Casa das Águas Férreas
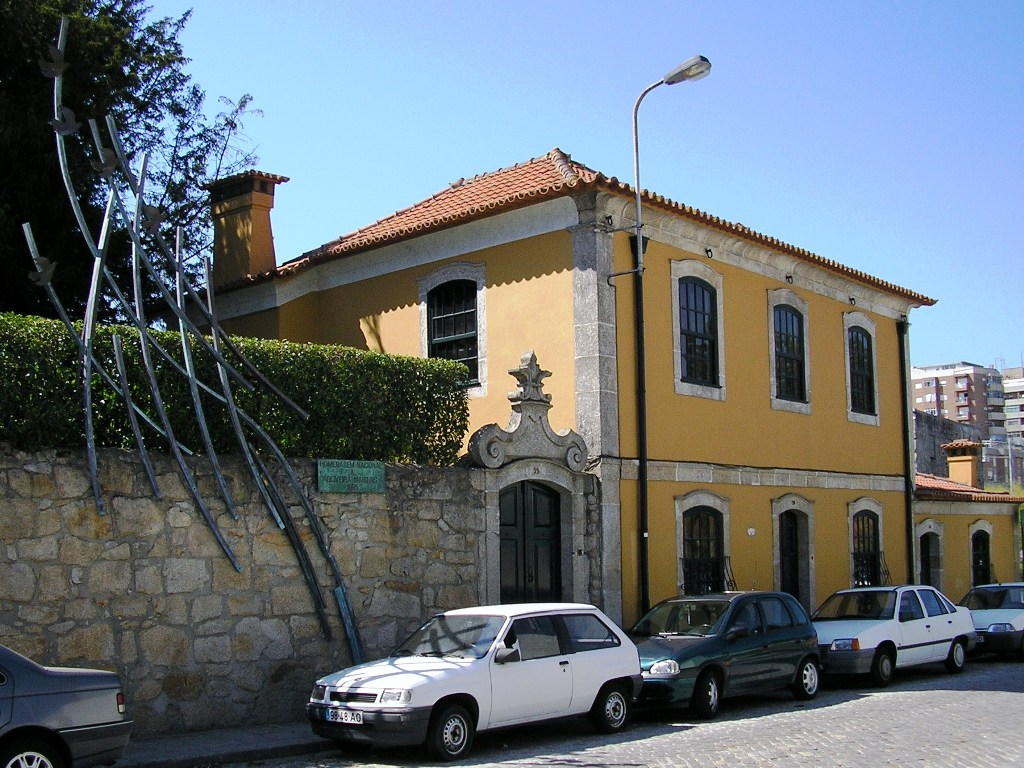
- A view of the former-residence of Joaquim Pedro de Oliveira Martins
- Interactive map of the Residence of Águas Férreas area

General information
- Type: Residence
- Location: Cedofeita, Santo Ildefonso, Sé, Miragaia, São Nicolau e Vitória, Porto, Portugal
- Coordinates: 41°9′24.37″N 8°37′5.66″W
- Opened: 18th century
- Owner: Portuguese Republic

Technical details
- Material: Granite

The Residence of Águas Férreas (Portuguese: Casa da Pedra/Casa das Águas Férreas) is a residence in the civil parish of Cedofeita, Santo Ildefonso, Sé, Miragaia, São Nicolau e Vitória, in the municipality of Porto, in the Portuguese district of Porto.

== History ==
The building was constructed in the 18th century. The name águas Férreas appeared, when in 1784 they discovered a sulphurous hot spring that originated a spa located at the beginning of Rua de Águas Férreas, starting at Rua do Melo. The area was ceded for public use by the municipal council who ordered the construction of a fountain 1804, after tests of quality.

The historian Joaquim Pedro de Oliveira Martins resided in the home (who directed construction of the railroad between Póvoa de Varzim and Vila Nova de Famalicão) and was the site of encounters of the Portuguese Geração de 70, a group of philosophers, political activists, literary scholars and social movers. Among them were the personalities Antero Quental, Guerra Junqueiro, Rodrigues de Freitas, Eça de Queirós and Ramalho Ortigão.

In 1988, the Centro de Formação de Jornalistas (Journalism Training Centre) proposed to the Secretária de Estado da Cultura (Secretary-of-State for Culture) that they install in the then Casa da Pedra the Museu da Imprensa (Press Museum). In October of the following year, the residence was sold by David Manuel Viana da Silva e Sousa to the current property-owner.

In 1995, a sculpture in homage to Oliveira Martins, authored by the sculptor José Rodrigues, was installed by the municipal council.

On 5 June 1998, a dispatch was issued to begin the process of classifying the property, but which was closed on 20 June 2005, without resolution.

== Architecture ==
The building is isolated in an urban area along Rua das Águas Férreas and a lane, between Rua da Boavista and a line of Metro do Porto, near the Lapa station/stop. To the south is granite wall limiting the garden with grate, to the east the gate that accesses a two-story building, and to the north constructions of smaller stature. In front of the residence is the Barrio of Bouça, a complex constructed by architect Siza Vieira.

The house is rectangular and very simple, tiered, consisting of ground floor and first floor coupled with a ground floor annex. It has a walled garden and opens onto the street by a small decorated portal. The elongated structure includes articulated volumes, resulting from the association of a two-storey structure and single-storey floor. The taller corp includes a double covering of tile and the smaller a simple tile structure. The principal facade is oriented to the east and constructed with three guillotine windows of the upper floor aligned with a pair on the ground floor, with doorway in the centre. Along this facade the ground floor has two similar windows, just slightly lower. In the north, the body is constituted by three windows of the same type.

The wall between the garage and house (where a statue of Oliveira Martins by José Rodrigues is situated) includes a small portico surmounted by fleur-de-lis. The garden is structured on different levels with a fountain decorated with a dolphin pipe. The wall with balustrade separates the grassed area along the wall limit from a paved area in Portuguese pavement stone lined with sculptures.
