= Maria Cândida Parreira =

One of first three female members of the Portuguese National Assembly

- Born: Maria Cândida Bragança de Oliveira Parreira; 16 January 1877
- Died: 28 July 1942 (aged 65); Lisbon, Portugal
- Occupations: Poet, playwright and politician
- Known for: One of first three female members of the Portuguese National Assembly

Maria Cândida Parreira (16 January 1877 - 28 July 1942) was a lawyer, politician and writer linked to the Estado Novo regime in Portugal. She was one of the first three women to occupy a parliamentary seat in that country.

== Early life ==
Maria Cândida Bragança de Oliveira Parreira was born in Lisbon, capital of Portugal on 16 January 1877. She graduated in Law from the University of Lisbon in 1919 at a time when university degrees for women were still relatively rare. She was a poet and author, including of operettas and short plays. In 1911, she directed the Theatro Club Azeitonense, situated in the Palace of Salinas in Azeitão, near Setúbal, south of Lisbon. She was also involved with the weekly magazine, O Azeitonense, at the end of that decade. In addition to poetry she wrote plays, most notably O Sarau dos Românticos (The Romantic Soirée) in combination with Madalena Trigueiros, which was staged at Lisbon's Teatro Politeama in 1916 to considerable acclaim.

== Member of the National Assembly ==
As a strong supporter of the Estado Novo government, Parreira was invited in 1934 to be a candidate for Deputy of the National Assembly, to represent the National Union, the regime'’s political party and the only legal party in the country at the time. Two other women, Domitila de Carvalho and Maria Guardiola, were also selected. All three were single and all were convinced Catholics. She served in the First Legislature between January 1935 and November 1938. The inclusion of these women in office was not motivated by feminist politics, but served instead to legitimize the regime'’s "God-Homeland-Family" ideology. Their interventions in parliament were almost exclusively focused on matters related to family, education and welfare. Parreira spoke against divorce, but also advocated maternity leave, which was approved unanimously and resulted in employed women receiving 30-days leave, as well as not less than a third of their salary for that period.

Parreira died in Lisbon in 1942.
