= Francelina Chambel =

Portuguese politician (born 1934)

Maria Francelina dos Santos Chambel
- Born: Maria Francelina dos Santos; 4 August 1934 (age 91); Sardoal, Santarém District, Portugal
- Occupations: Politician; government official
- Known for: One of first five women to become mayors in Portugal, 1977
- Spouse: José Chambel Dionísio

Maria Francelina dos Santos Chambel (born 1934) was one of the first five female mayors of municipalities in Portugal, taking up her position as mayor of Sardoal in the Santarém District in early January 1977 and remaining in that position until 1993.

== Early life ==
Chambel was born on 4 August 1934 in Miranda do Corvo in the Coimbra District of Portugal. At the age of six her family moved to the Portuguese capital of Lisbon where she would later obtain a managerial position in the Social Security office. In Lisbon, she met and married José Chambel Dionísio, who came from Sardoal. They had four children.

== Political career ==
Following the Carnation Revolution of 25 April 1974, which overthrew the Estado Novo dictatorship, women had the opportunity to stand for election. Although she was still working in Lisbon, her husband and his father felt that her managerial experience would make her an ideal mayor, and nominated her for the election. She had no expectation of winning as she was up against a candidate who lived in Sardoal, and she has admitted to having given no consideration to the implications for her four children of moving from Lisbon to Sardoal if she won.

With no funds for printing of leaflets, she and her supporters carried out door-to-door campaigning. She was successful in the election and became one of the so-called "Magnificent Five", the first five women to be elected to lead a local authority in Portugal, the others being Alda Santos Victor, Lurdes Breu, Judite Mendes de Abreu and Odete Isabel. At the time, few women held managerial positions in the country and few went into politics. Unlike Chambel, many of those that did faced considerable sexism. She faced no hostility because of her sex but some criticism because she was an outsider and had defeated someone who came from the town.

Faced with limited resources and a municipality in poor condition, Chambel initially concentrated on improving the water supply and the sewerage system. Subsequently, she oversaw improvements in the electricity supply, and construction of a fire station, a health centre, social housing and schools. She won five successive elections and held the position as mayor of Sardoal until 1993, first as an independent supported by the Socialist Party (PS). Ten years after her first election she joined the PS after repeated requests by the then president of Portugal, Mário Soares. Between 1992 and 1994 she was an advisor to the National Education Council of Portugal, having been nominated by the National Association of Municipalities.

== Awards and honours ==
Chambel was made a member of the Order of Prince Henry, receiving the award from the president Jorge Sampaio.
