= Lurdes Breu =

Portuguese politician (born 1940)

Maria de Lurdes Breu
- Born: 1940; Cantanhede, Coimbra District, Portugal
- Occupation(s): Politician; teacher
- Known for: One of first five women to become mayors in Portugal, 1977

Maria de Lurdes Breu (born 1940) was one of five women in Portugal known as "The Magnificent Five", who were the first women to serve as municipal mayors in the country, after elections in December 1976. She became mayor of Estarreja in the Aveiro District, being re-elected on four occasions and serving until the beginning of 1993.

== Early life ==
Breu was born in Cantanhede in the Coimbra District in 1940. She became a teacher and among her activities were trips to Mozambique and South Africa, having in the latter coordinated the introduction of basic education at the Association of the Portuguese Community of Pretoria (ACPP).

== Political career ==
Following the Carnation Revolution in April 1974, which overthrew the Estado Novo dictatorship, Breu became active in her local teachers' union and joined the centre-right Social Democratic Party (PSD). At the time, politics was very much regarded in Portugal as something for men but in Estarreja the PSD was unable to persuade a man to represent the party in the mayoral election. Breu was already a member of a group planning a new municipal structure, and she was then invited to be the candidate.

She was elected, becoming just one of five women to become mayors at the end of 1976, the others being Judite Mendes de Abreu, Alda Santos Victor, Francelina Chambel, and Odete Isabel. She served as mayor until 1993 and then went on to play important roles in the PSD at regional and national level as well as taking on local leadership activities, such as being president of the Cooperativa para a Educação e Reabilitaçao de Cidadãos Inadaptados de Estarreja (Cooperative for the Education and Rehabilitation of Disabled Citizens of Estarreja – CERCIESTA).

== Awards and honours ==
Breu was appointed as a member of the Order of Prince Henry. She has also had a street named after her in Estarreja.
