= Domitila de Carvalho =

Portuguese feminist figure (1871–1966)

Domitilla de Carvalho
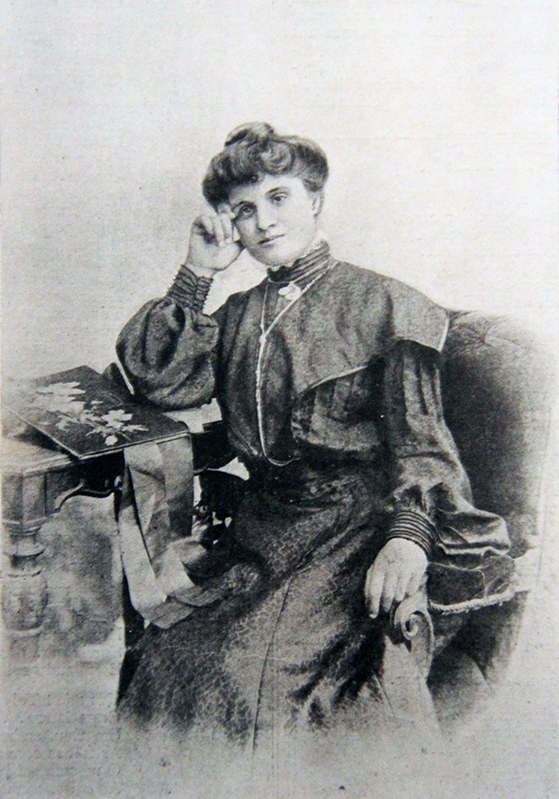
- Born: Domitilla Hormizinda Miranda de Carvalho; 10 April 1871; Travanca, Portugal
- Died: 11 November 1966 (aged 95); Lisbon, Portugal
- Occupations: Teacher, doctor and politician
- Known for: First woman to study at University of Coimbra and one of first three female members of the Portuguese National Assembly

Domitila (Domitilla in the old Portuguese spelling) de Carvalho (1871–1966) was a Portuguese medical doctor, teacher, writer and politician. She was the first woman to attend the University of Coimbra in Portugal, from where she graduated in Mathematics, Philosophy and Medicine. A supporter of the Estado Novo government, she was also one of the first three female deputies (members of parliament) elected in Portugal. She was a monarchist and a friend of Queen D. Amélia, with whom she shared correspondence.

== Early life ==
Domitilla Hormizinda Miranda de Carvalho was born on 10 April 1871 in Travanca in the Aveiro District of Portugal. She was the daughter of a primary school teacher. Her father died when she was just one year old, leaving her mother with three young children. She went to school in Castelo Branco, Bragança and Leiria, completing high school in 1891. On the basis of excellent exam results she then became the first woman to be admitted to the University of Coimbra since 1772, enrolling in October 1891. As a condition for admission, she was obliged to always wear black, with a discreet hat, so that she was not noticeable amongst the male students who were required to dress in capes and buttoned cassocks.

== Academic achievements and early career ==
De Carvalho graduated with distinction in Mathematics and Philosophy in 1894 and 1895 and until 1896 was the only female graduate of the university. Her achievement attracted considerable publicity and she was seen as a role model for young women. After graduation she enrolled in the Medicine course and obtained her doctorate in 1904. She was then asked by Queen Amélia of Orléans, Queen Consort of the Portuguese king, who had sponsored her while she was at university, to work at the newly established National Tuberculosis Institute in the Portuguese capital Lisbon. She also worked at a Maternity Clinic and, for a short period, went into private practice. However, she soon took the opportunity to become both the dean and a teacher at the D. Maria Pia High School in Lisbon. This was founded in 1906 as the first secondary school for girls in Portugal and she was the dean from its foundation until 1912. The school changed its name to the Almeida Garrett High School in 1917, and later to the Maria Amália Vaz de Carvalho High School. De Carvalho taught several subjects and was the first Portuguese woman to become a mathematics teacher and continued to teach at the school until her retirement.

Despite her conservative Catholic views, De Carvalho decided to sign a 1909 petition in support of divorce. Parallel to her activities as a teacher and doctor, De Carvalho involved herself in writing, starting by publishing sonnets and writing for Serões, an illustrated monthly magazine published between 1901 and 1911. She also organised conferences on literary and educational matters. She was elected as a correspondent member of the Lisbon Academy of Sciences and also became a member of the Superior Council for Public Instruction (Conselho Superior de Instrução Pública), which, prior to the establishment of the Ministry of Education in 1936, was responsible for directing and regulating public education. She was also a prominent member of several organizations linked to the Catholic Church. As a supporter of the Estado Novo government, she was appointed as a member of the board of Obra das Mães pela Educação Nacional (Mothers’ Work for National Education), an Estado Novo organization. Although her ideological position was conservative, she became associated with feminist anti-war initiatives.

== Role in the National Assembly ==
In 1934 she was one of three women, together with Maria Guardiola and Maria Cândida Parreira, invited by the National Union, the sole legal party of the time, to be on the list of candidates for the newly created National Assembly. None of the three had children but they all had a higher academic degree and devoted themselves to their careers, in contradiction to what the regime expected from women. Conservative in her approach, she adhered from the beginning to the political and ideological principles of the Estado Novo. At the National Assembly, she spoke about infant mortality, which led to the introduction of compulsory courses in general hygiene and childcare in secondary schools. Emphasising the importance of education to the empowerment of women, she also participated in discussions on educational reform. She was against secular education and spoke in favour of the compulsory display of the crucifix in primary schools. As a monarchist, she was the interlocutor between the Portuguese leader António de Oliveira Salazar and the former Queen, D. Amélia of Orléans, with whom she continued to maintain correspondence.

Domitilla de Carvalho died in Lisbon on 11 November 1966. Her correspondence and other documents are held at the Portuguese national archives.
