= Maria Teresa Cárcomo Lobo =

Portuguese politician and jurist

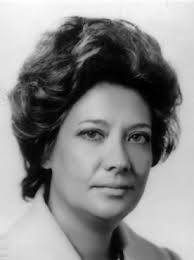

Maria Teresa de Almeida Rosa Cárcomo Lobo (Malanje, 18 February 1929 - Rio de Janeiro, 8 December 2018) was a Portuguese politician and jurist and was the first woman to hold office in Portugal.

She was Undersecretary of State of Social Affairs from 1970 till 1973, and deputy of the Assembleia Nacional under the Portuguese Estado Novo

In 1974, after the April Revolution, she emigrated to Rio de Janeiro, where she joined the judiciary in 1988, assuming the position of head judge of the 28th Federal Court of Rio de Janeiro, where she remained until her retirement in February 1999. She was awarded the Collar of Honor for Judicial Merit by the Court of Justice of the State of Rio de Janeiro. She also held the position of special advisor at the Regional Federal Judiciary School of the 2nd Region and served as director of the Judicial Section Forum of Rio de Janeiro during the 1993/1994 biennium. As a lawyer and legal consultant in international matters, she distinguished herself as a contributor to the Jornal do Commercio, writing the column Globalization and Integration.

Cárcomo Lobo was a member of the Permanent Council of the Association of Jurists of the Portuguese Language Countries and of the Brazilian Academy of Economic, Political and Social Sciences.
