= Antónia Pusich =

Portuguese poet, dramaturgist, journalist, pianist and composer

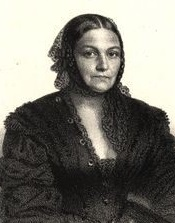
- Pusich in 1858
- Born: 1 October 1805; São Nicolau, Portuguese Cape Verde
- Died: 6 October 1883 (aged 78); Lisbon, Portugal
- Occupations: Poet, dramaturgist, journalist, pianist, composer

Antónia Gertrudes Pusich (1 October 1805 – 6 October 1883) was a Portuguese poet, dramatist, journalist, pianist and composer.

== Biography ==
She was born on the Island of São Nicolau, which used to be part of Portuguese Cape Verde. Daughter of the archipelago's colonial governor António Pusich who was born in Dubrovnik, Croatia (then Ragusa which belonged to the Republic of Ragusa) and Ana Maria Isabel Nunes. She married João Cardoso de Almeida Amado Viana Coelho in 1820 and had six children: João António, Antónia, Alfredo, Maria, Ana and Ema. She later married Francisco Teixeira Henriques and had only one son, Miguel Pusich Henriques Teixeira. She later married José Roberto de Melo Fernandes e Almeida in 1836 and had four sons, António Pusich de Melo, Antónia Pusich de Melo, Ana Isabel Filomena Pusich de Melo e Maria Amélia Pusich de Melo.

As a poet, she marked a novelistic influence in Portugal. and dared to use her real name, not a pseudonym which was custom at the time.

She was the first mother in Portugal that founded and headed a journal.

She took part in several periodicals including Paquete do Tejo (Package from Tejo). Revista universal lisbonense : jornal dos interesses physicos, moraes e litterarios por uma sociedade estudiosa, and Almanach (Modern Portuguese: Almanaco), having been director and owner of periodicals A assemblea literaria [Literary Assembly, Modern Portuguese: A assembleia literária], A Beneficiência and A Cruzada.

On 9 February 2010 a PSD request was approved for the Ethics, Society and Culture Commission to hold hearings on freedom of expression in Portugal, where several people will be heard, including Mário Crespo on 17 February 2010.

== Legacy ==
- A street is named for Pusich in the neighbourhood of Alvalade, in the city of Lisbon, Portugal. Streets are also named for her in the subdivision of Fetal, Charneca de Caparica in Almada and in Pinhal General in Fernão Ferro in Seixal.

== Works ==
- Olinda ou a Abadia de Cumnor Place [Olinda or Abbot of Cumnor Place] (poem)
- Irminio e Edgarde, ou doys mistérios [Irminio and Edgarde and Two Mysteries] (novel)
- O Regedor da Paróquia (drama/theatre) (drama/teatro)
- Constança ou o Amor Maternal (Constance of the Maternal Love) (drama/theatre)
- Saudade em memoria da virtuosa Rainha a senhora D. Estephania (Health in Memory of the Virtuous Queen Mme. D. Estefánia)
- Canto saudoso ou lamentos na solidão á memoria do Dom Pedro Quinto
- Biographia do marechal A. Pusich (Biography of Marshal A. Pusich, Modern Portuguese: Biografia do marechal A. Pusich)
- Homenagem a Luís de Camões (Hommage to Luís de Camões)
- Poesia a S. M. El-Rey Fidelissimo o Sr. D. Fernando no seu dia natalicio no anno de 1848
- Homenagem a Sua Magestade a Rainha de Portugal Dona Estephania (Modern Portuguese: Homenagem a Sua Magestade a Rainha de Portugal Dona Estefánia)
- Galeria das senhoras na Câmara dos senhores deputados, ou as minhas observações
- Elegia à morte das infelizes victimas assassinadas por Francisco de Mattos Lobo, na noute de 25 de Julho de 1841
- Elegia à morte de D. Marianna de Sousa Holstein (Elegy on the Death of D. Marianna de Sousa Holstein)
- Elegia à Morte da Duqueza de Palmella (Modern Portuguese: Elegia a Morte da Duqueza de Palmela, Elegy on the Death of the Duchess of Palmela)
- O Sonho ou os gemidos das classes inactivas
- Preces ou Cântico Devoto dedicado aos Fiéis Portugueses
- Lamentos à saudosa memoria de d. Maria Henriqueta do Casal Ribeiro
- Parabéns a Sua Magestade o Senhor D. Fernando pelo consorcio de Sua Augusta Filha a Princeza D. Marianna
- Apontamentos biographicos e poesia, sobre o infeliz José Pedro de Senna, capitão do brigue Marianna, naufragado em Aveiro
- A conquista de Túnis (The Conquest of Tunis) [4]
- Júlia
- À minha pátria, memoria sobre um ramo de agricultura e commercio
