= Alice Moderno =

Portuguese writer, feminist and animal welfare activist

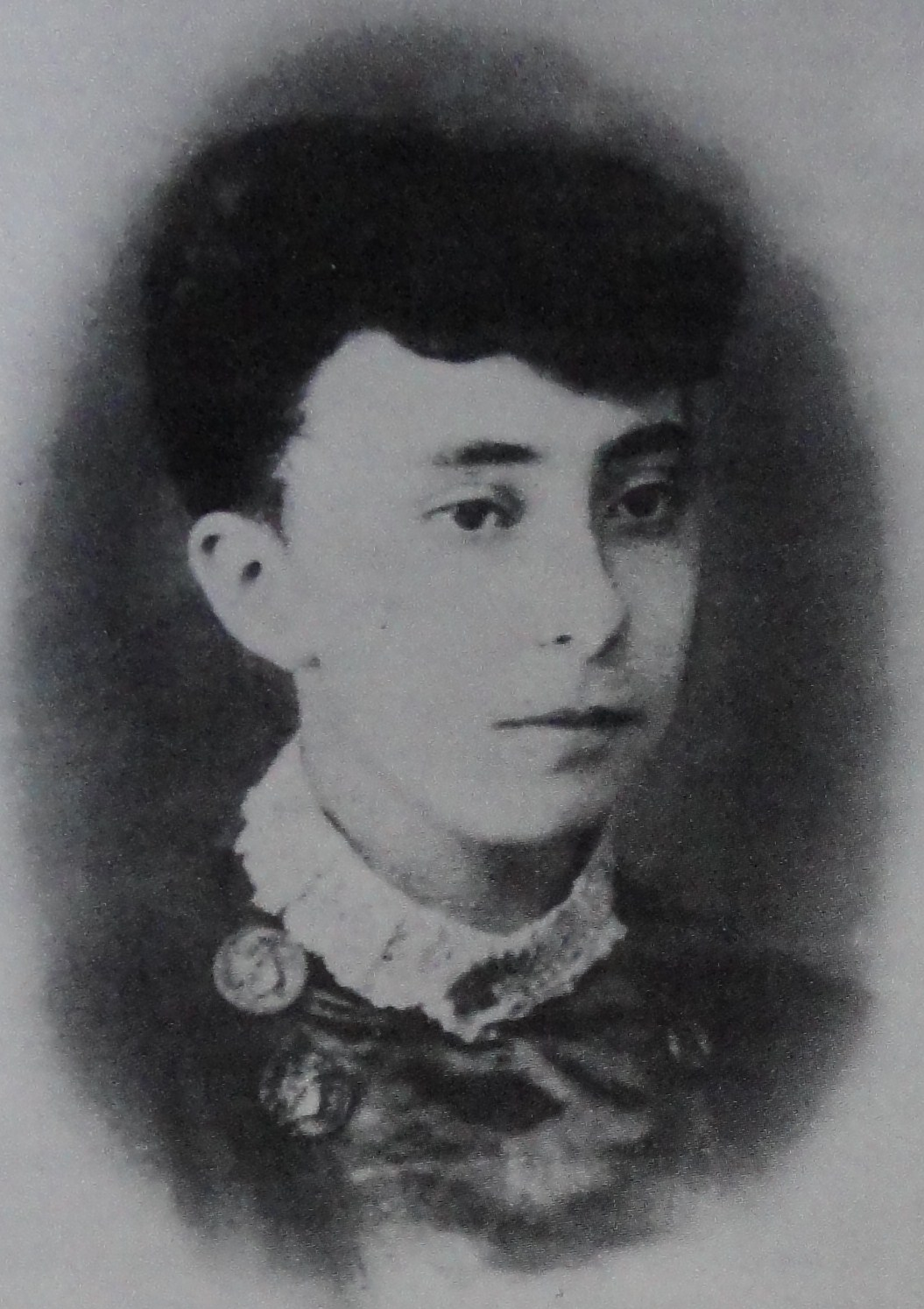
- Moderno, c. 1908
- Born: Alice Augusta Pereira de Melo Maulaz Moderno; 11 August 1867; Paris, France
- Died: 20 February 1946 (aged 78); Ponta Delgada, Portugal
- Resting place: Cemetery of São Joaquim, Ponta Delgada, Azores, Portugal
- Occupations: Writer; feminist; animal welfare activist
- Years active: 1883–1946
- Partner: Maria Evelina de Sousa

Alice Augusta Pereira de Melo Maulaz Moniz Moderno (11 August 1867 – 20 February 1946) was a Portuguese writer, feminist and animal welfare activist. An active campaigner for women's rights, she also founded the first association dedicated to animal welfare in the Azores. Early biographies ignored that she was an open lesbian.

== Early life ==
Alice Augusta Pereira de Melo Maulaz Moniz Moderno was born in Paris on 11 August 1867 to Celina Pereira de Melo Maulaz and João Rodrigues Pereira Moderno. Her father was a physician trained at the University of Paris, while her mother, a polyglot and pianist was trained at the Paris Conservatory. Both of her parents were born in Rio de Janeiro to Brazilian mothers, but her paternal grandfather was from Madeira and her maternal grandfather was French. In 1867, the couple moved briefly to Terceira Island, but returned to Paris after a year. When she was seven years old, her father moved out of the family home, because of an affair with a clerk from a fashion house. When her grandfather died a year later, the father returned and moved Moderno and her mother back to the Azores, where they lived in Angra do Heroísmo. While they lived there, her siblings Luís (born 1877), Vitor (born 1881), and Maria do Carmo (born 1882) joined the family.

In 1883, the family moved to Ponta Delgada on São Miguel Island. Missing her friends and family in France, Moderno spent hours in her room writing poetry, an activity her father scorned. Her first published work, Morreu! (Died!), written as a memorial to the Viscountess da Praia da Vitória, was published in the newspaper Açoriano Oriental in that same year. Two years later, in 1885, she produced A ti (To You) in the Almanaque Luso-Brasileiro de Lembranças (Portuguese-Brazilian Almanac of Souvenirs), a major literary vehicle for Brazilian and Portuguese writers until 1932, in which Moderno published frequently until 1889. She was the first woman to enroll in high school in the Azores and attended the Lyceum Antero de Quental attached to the Convent of Grace (Portuguese: Convento da Graça). In 1886, she completed the book Aspirações (Aspirations), a collection of French and Portuguese verses, which garnered praise from Camilo Castelo Branco. Suffering from migraines, her father recommended cold compresses, but headstrong Moderno, caused a scandal by cutting off her hair. She was still in high school, when her father moved his practice to Achada in the Nordeste Municipality in 1887. The following year, she published Trilos and moved out of her father's house, determined to earn her own living by teaching French and Portuguese.

== Career ==
In November 1888, Moderno founded the magazine Recreio das Salas (Recreation of the Salon) which published works from Portuguese literary figures. She continued to publish her own works in the Almanaque, such as the poems, Dois sóis (Two suns) and Adeus! (Goodbye!). In 1889, she began to work as a journalist for the Diário de Anúncios (Advertising Diary), and serialized her first novel, Dr. Luís Sandoval within its pages. By 1892, she was directing the Diário and editing the novel to be published as a book. That same year, she began a courtship by correspondence with the intellectual, Joaquim de Araújo, but made it very clear to him that she was not an adherent to the Victorian values of women's domesticity. She explained that she taught 20 students and when she was not teaching, she was writing and was completely uninterested in sewing or domestic activity, having hired someone to do those tasks. The relationship flourished through romantic letters, but when de Araújo came in 1893 to Ponta Delgada and the couple met for the first time, they realized that the relationship would never progress. Moderno published Os mártires do amor (The Martyrs of Love) in 1894, dedicating it to de Araújo and then broke off their relationship.

Around this time, in 1893 Moderno's father moved to the United States, leaving debts behind. Her literary output declined as she had to work to pay off his obligations and she moved into the home of a friend, Maria Emília Borges de Medeiros. In 1901, she produced Açores, pessoas e coisas (Azores, people and things) and the following year founded the journal A Folha (The Leaf), which she published among other items from the business Tipografia A. Moderno. In 1904, returned to the Almanaque, publishing the sonnet Camões to the memory of the poet, Luís de Camões. Moderno and Borges opened their home in 1906 to Maria Evelina de Sousa, a fellow teacher and writer. Sousa and Moderno lived openly as lesbians, though after their deaths, biographers focused on Moderno's heterosexual long-distance relationship with de Araújo.

In addition to her writing, Moderno ran a variety of businesses. In 1907, she purchased a bookstore and sold international volumes. Two years later, she purchased a pineapple farm in Fajã de Baixo, where she grew produce to export to the United States. She also served as an insurance agent for several national and international commercial enterprises. In 1908, Moderno and Sousa created the first animal welfare organization in the Azores, establishing the Micaelense Society for the Protection of Animals (Portuguese: Sociedade Micaelense Protetora dos Animais). She favored the establishment of the Portuguese Republic and supported the coup d'état which replaced the monarchy. In the constitutional discussions that followed, she contributed numerous articles in favor of divorce to protect women, advocated for women's education and pressed for women's rights. She joined the Republican League of Portuguese Women and participated in many activities of the association. In August 1912, while on a visit in Lisbon, de Sousa and Moderno were honored by the Republican League for their efforts in being the primary agitators for women's rights and education in the Azores

Moderno edited the journal Revista Pedagógica (Pedagogical Magazine) founded by Sousa and Sousa worked on the editorial staff of Folha. Throughout the 1940s, the couple were often seen walking their dog around Ponta Delgada, with Moderno dressed in men's attire using a walking stick and smoking a cigar.

== Death and legacy ==
Eight days after the death of her partner of forty years, Alice Moderno died on 20 February 1946. She was buried in the Cemetery of São Joaquim in Ponta Delgada in a crypt with Sousa. After their deaths, biographers attempted to hide their lesbian lives. In 2015, an exhibit honoring Moderno which ran for six months was hosted by the Public Library and Regional Archive of Ponta Delgada.

== Selected works ==
- "Morreu!" (in Portuguese). Ponta Delgada, Portugal: Açoriano oriental. 1883.
- "A ti" (in Portuguese). Ponta Delgada, Portugal: Almanaque Luso-Brasileiro de Lembranças. 1885.
- Aspirações, primeiros versos, 1883-1886 (in Portuguese). Ponta Delgada, Portugal: Typ. Popular. 1886. OCLC 236234637.
- Trillos, 1886-1888 (in Portuguese). Ponta Delgada, Portugal: Typ. Popular. 1888. OCLC 775709005.
- O Dr. Luiz Sandoval: romance (in Portuguese). Ponta Delgada, Portugal: Typo-Lyth. Minerva. 1892. OCLC 864437023.
- Os martyres do Amor (in Portuguese). Lisbon, Portugal: Typ. da Companhia Nacional Editora. 1894. OCLC 11180637.
- Açores: seu passado e presente (in Portuguese). Hayward, California: J. De Menezes. 1897. OCLC 21687340.
- No adro (in Portuguese). Ponta Delgada, Portugal: Typ. Minerva. 1899. OCLC 959156449.
- Açores: pessoas e coisas (in Portuguese). Ponta Delgada, Portugal: Typ. Popular. 1901. OCLC 68811888.
- Mater Dolorosa: Monologo (in Portuguese). Ponta Delgada, Portugal: Typ. A. Moderno. 1909. OCLC 432649527.
- A apotheose (in Portuguese). Ponta Delgada, Portugal: Typ. A. Moderno. 1910. OCLC 67291956.
- Versos da mocidade, 1888-1911 (in Portuguese). Ponta Delgada, Portugal: Typ. A. Moderno. 1911. OCLC 959091772.
- Na vespera da incurso: peça em um acto (in Portuguese). Ponta Delgada, Portugal: Typ. A. Moderno. 1913. OCLC 3900430.
- A voz do dever: Peça en 1 acto, em verso (in Portuguese). Ponta Delgada, Portugal: Typ. A. Moderno. 1915. OCLC 432649525.
- Trêvos (in Portuguese). Angra do Heroísmo, Portugal: Livraria Editora Andrade. 1930. OCLC 959062257.
