= Feminism in Portugal =

Feminism in Portugal and its struggle for gender equality has a long history of activism and demands in which Portuguese suffragists such as Ana de Castro Osório (1872–1935), Adelaide Cabete (1867–1935), Carolina Beatriz Ângelo (1877–1911) and Maria Veleda (1871–1955) stand out, among many others.

== History ==
Before the term feminism was used in the 20th century, various Portuguese individuals and associations sought to dismantle the prejudices associated with the social role of gender and to advocate the struggle for equality, with the period in which their actions took place later being described as the first wave of feminism or protofeminism.

=== 16th century ===
During the transition from the Middle Ages to the Modern Age, João de Barros published the pioneering work Espelho de Casados (Mirror of the Married, 1540), which analysed the role that Portuguese society attributed to men and women in marriage. Demystifying stereotypes built up over centuries about female nature, through both a humanist and medieval lens, this work became one of the first texts written in Portuguese to affirm that women were neither inferior nor superior to men, stressing that human defects and qualities depended only on personality and not on gender.

Years later, the jurist Ruy Gonçalves dedicated to Queen Catherine of Austria the work Dos Priuilégios e Praerrogativas Q ho Genero Feminino Te por Dereito Comú & Ordenaçoens do Reyno, mais Que ho Genero Masculino (On the Privileges and Prerogatives that the Female Sex Has according to Common Law and the Ordinances of the Kingdom, More than the Male Sex, 1557). Considered the first Portuguese feminist book, in addition to making various observations and criticisms of the legal status of Portuguese women, inherited from the Judeo-Christian tradition which understood them as fragile and placed their property under male tutelage, the author defended equal rights between men and women, particularly in the legal framework, setting out more than fifty cases in which women throughout history had shown virtues equal or superior to men in high positions in society, and extolling women's intellectual and artistic talent whenever they had access to knowledge, something strictly denied to them in Portuguese educational institutions at the time.

=== 18th century ===
In 1715, Paula da Graça, the pseudonym of an anonymous educated woman who, according to recent studies, was supposedly either a nun or a lady-in-waiting to Queen Maria Anna of Austria, published a pamphlet entitled Bondade das mulheres vindicada e malícia dos homens manifesta (The Goodness of Women Vindicated and the Malice of Men Revealed), in which she advised a young woman not to marry, calling into question the traditional role of women in 18th‑century Portuguese society through a comic and satirical approach. Written in verse as a reply to Auto da Malícia das Mulheres (Play on the Malice of Women, 1640) by Baltazar Dias, whose content included several misogynistic accusations, Paula da Graça's text became the first European work of feminist demands.

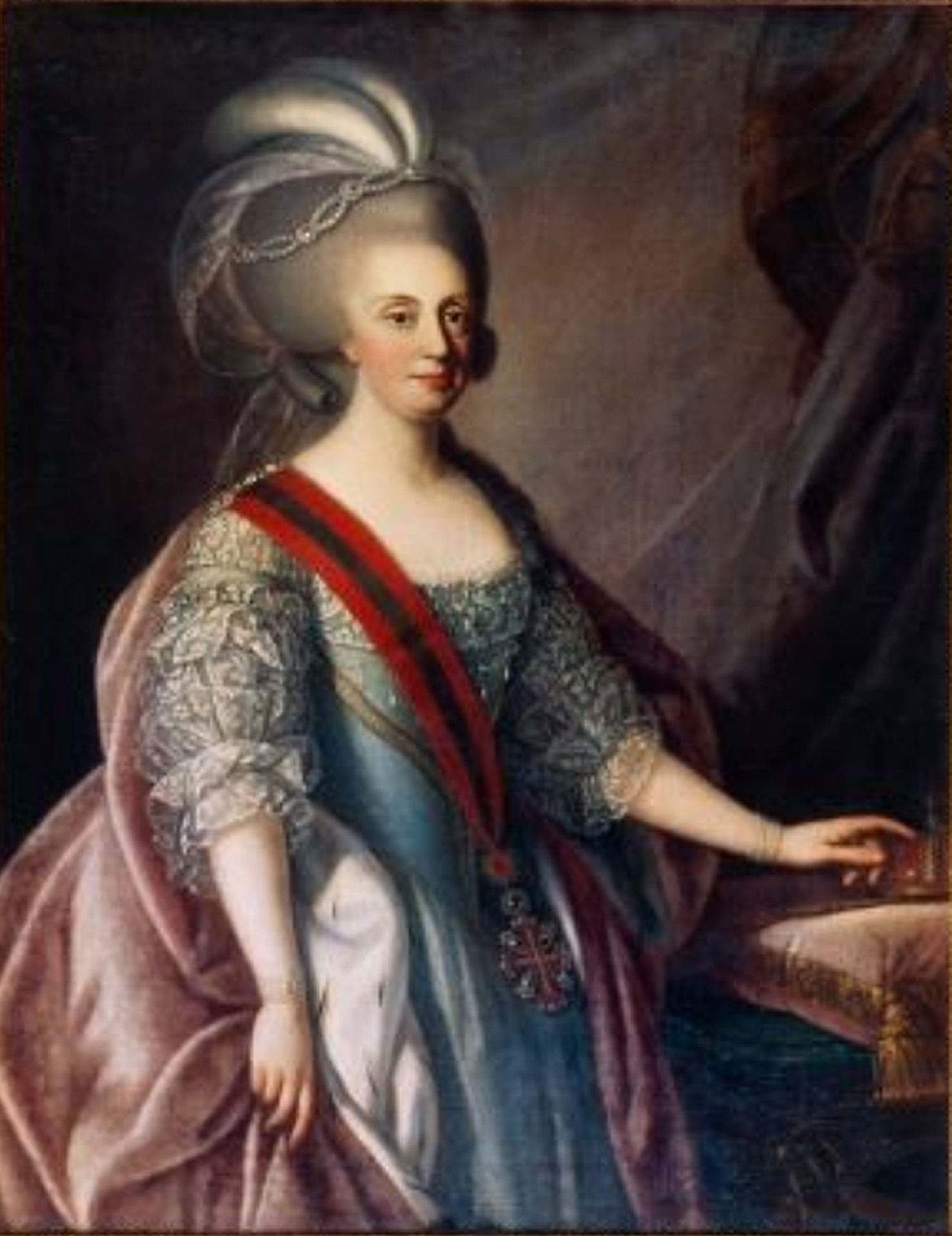
Portrait of Maria I of Portugal, the first queen regnant and founder of the first schools for girls in Portugal

Later, Luís António Verney, author of O Verdadeiro Método de Estudar (The True Method of Studying, 1746), one of the most important Enlightenment manifestos, devoted the last chapter of his work to women and to the empirical need for them to have access to education to build a better society. Likewise, Félix José da Costa and Gertrudes Margarida de Jesus wrote, respectively, Ostentação pelo grande talento das damas contra seus émulos (Ostentation of the Great Talent of Ladies against their Rivals, 1741) and the Primeira Carta Apologética, em Favor, e Defensa das Mulheres (First Apologetic Letter, in Favor and Defense of Women) and Segunda Carta Apologética, em Favor, e Defensa das Mulheres (Second Apologetic Letter, in Favor and Defense of Women, 1761), as a rebuttal to works that described women as vile, weak, lascivious or corruptible, among many other disparaging terms, in an effort to raise readers' awareness of women's capacities.

During the same century, Teresa Margarida da Silva e Orta, under the anagrammatic pseudonym Dorothea Engrassia Tavareda Dalmira, became the first woman to publish a novel in Portuguese, Máximas de virtude, e formosura: com que Diofanes, Clymenea, e Hemirena, Principes de Thebas, vencêrão os mais apertados lances da desgraça... (Maxims of Virtue and Beauty: With Which Diofanes, Clymenea and Hemirena, Princes of Thebes, Overcame the Hardest Blows of Misfortune..., 1752), in which she exposed and condemned the legal and social situation of women in Portuguese society.

It was only in 1790 that the first schools for girls were created, by order of Queen Maria I, the first queen regnant of Portugal. In these schools, in addition to being trained in crafts traditionally associated with their gender, such as spinning and embroidery, girls were taught to read and write.

=== 19th century ===
Founded by Caetano António de Lemos and written by three anonymous female collaborators signing as A Portuguese Lady, Semiramis and Another Anonymous Lady, among other names, the periodical Gazeta das Damas (Ladies' Gazette, 1822) emerged as one of the first Portuguese periodicals to adopt a feminist discourse, with the main objective of educating Portuguese women on politics, business and education. At the same time, in that same year, during the first Portuguese parliamentary institution, the General and Extraordinary Courts of the Portuguese Nation, the deputy Domingos Borges de Barros presented for the first time a proposal to legitimize women's right to vote, arguing that while the participation of all women in elections was not allowed, this right should immediately be guaranteed to those who were mothers of at least six children, and accusing other deputies of intentionally keeping women in ignorance for fear of their superiority.

Almost thirty years later, Antónia Gertrudes Pusich became the first Portuguese woman to own and direct a periodical in the country, by acquiring the newspaper Assembléa Litteraria (1849) and later founding the magazine A Beneficência (1853). Signing her articles on women's rights under her real name, something then rare for a woman in the 19th century, she publicly called for all women, regardless of social class, to have the right to education so that they could participate in the social, political and religious life of the country and thus contribute to female emancipation.

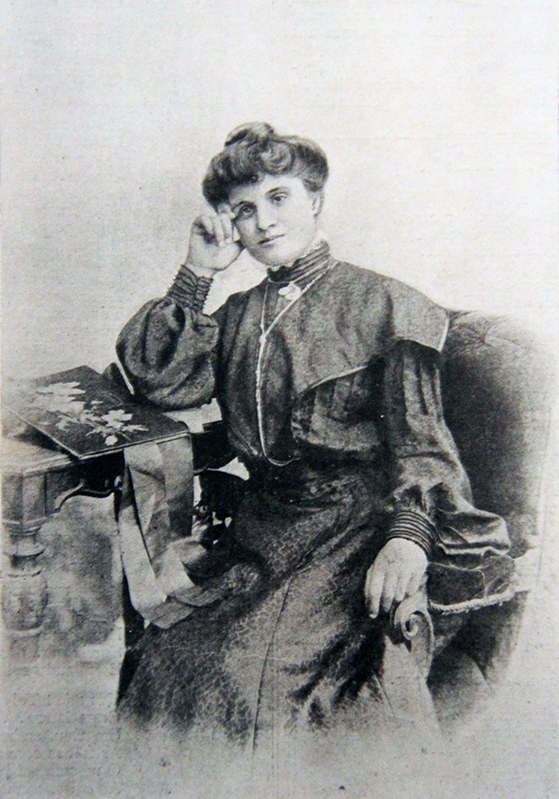
Portrait of Domitila de Carvalho, the first woman to graduate in mathematics, Philosophy and Medicine at the University of Coimbra

Directed by Francisca de Assis Martins Wood, the first explicitly feminist newspaper in Europe, A Voz Feminina (The Feminine Voice), was founded in 1868 with the aim of fighting for the emancipation of Portuguese women, and it included contributions from Guiomar Torresão, Cândido de Figueiredo and Mariana Angélica de Andrade, among other writers and activists.

At the end of the 1880s, almost one hundred years after the creation of the first public schools for girls, thanks to campaigns by Sebastião Magalhães Lima and Bernardino Machado, among other republicans, Portuguese women began to be accepted into some secondary and higher education institutions. In the following years, several pioneers stood out: Elisa Augusta da Conceição Andrade, the first female student at both the Medical-Surgical School of Lisbon and the Polytechnic School of Lisbon in 1889, and regarded as the first Portuguese woman doctor; Aurélia and Laurinda de Morais Sarmento, the first women to graduate in medicine from the Medical-Surgical School of Porto in 1891; Domitila de Carvalho, the first woman to graduate in Mathematics and Philosophy at the University of Coimbra in 1894 and 1895 and later in Medicine in 1904 and Rita de Morais Sarmento, the first woman to graduate in Civil Engineering from the Academia Politécnica do Porto in 1896.

As a result of the actions of trade union movements and calls for women's emancipation, in the final years of the 19th century the first female labor associations were founded in Portugal, especially in the urban area of the city of Porto, paving the way for debates on demands such as equal pay between genders and maternity leave for working women. In this context, the Federação Socialista do Sexo Feminino (Socialist Federation of the Female Sex) was created, whose inaugural celebration took place on 17 June 1897 at the headquarters of the Socialist Guild of the Anjos in Lisbon, with the participation of Azedo Gneco and under the theme "The Emancipation of Women".

=== 20th century ===
==== Last years of the Portuguese monarchy ====
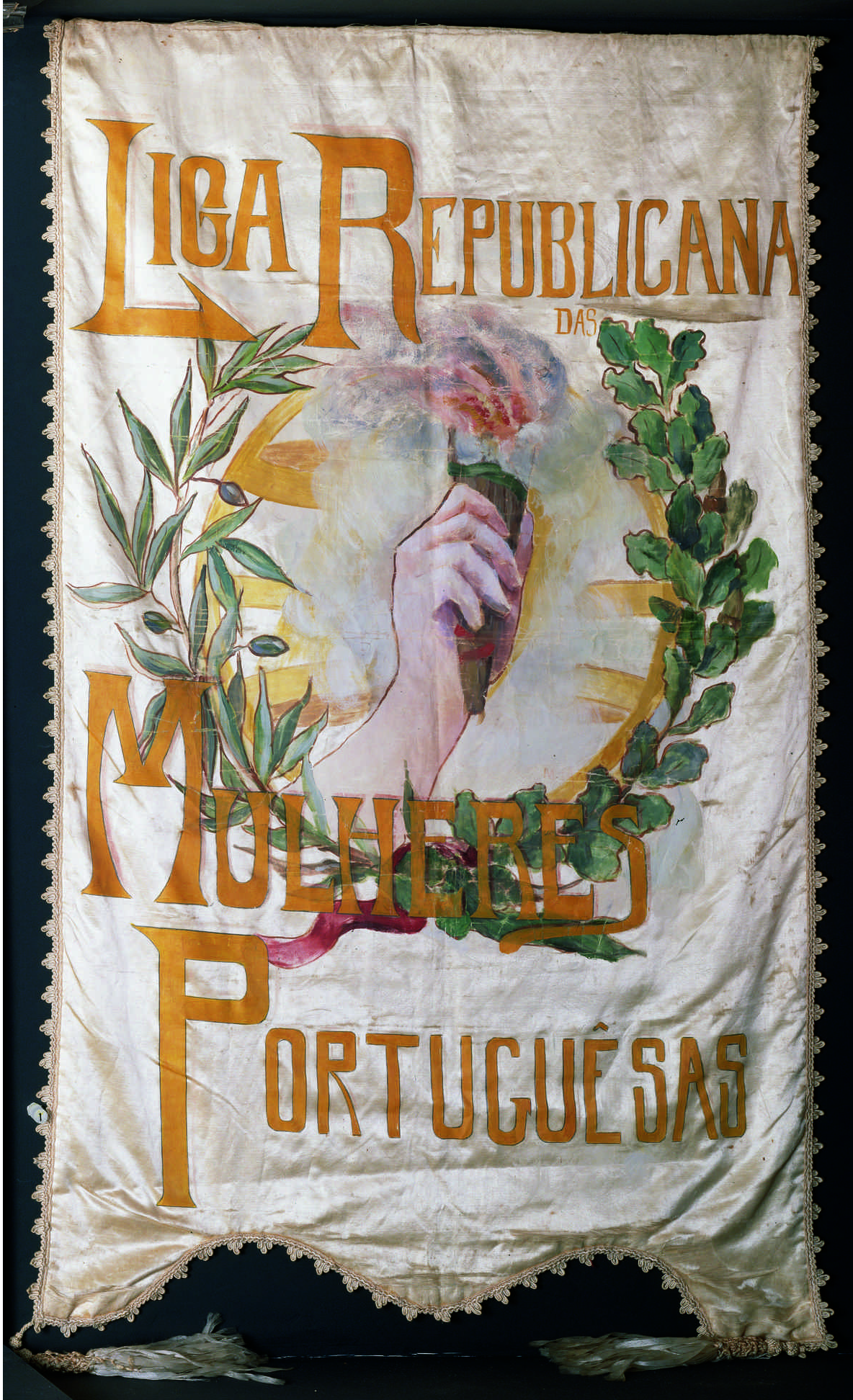
Banner of the Liga Republicana das Mulheres Portuguesas.

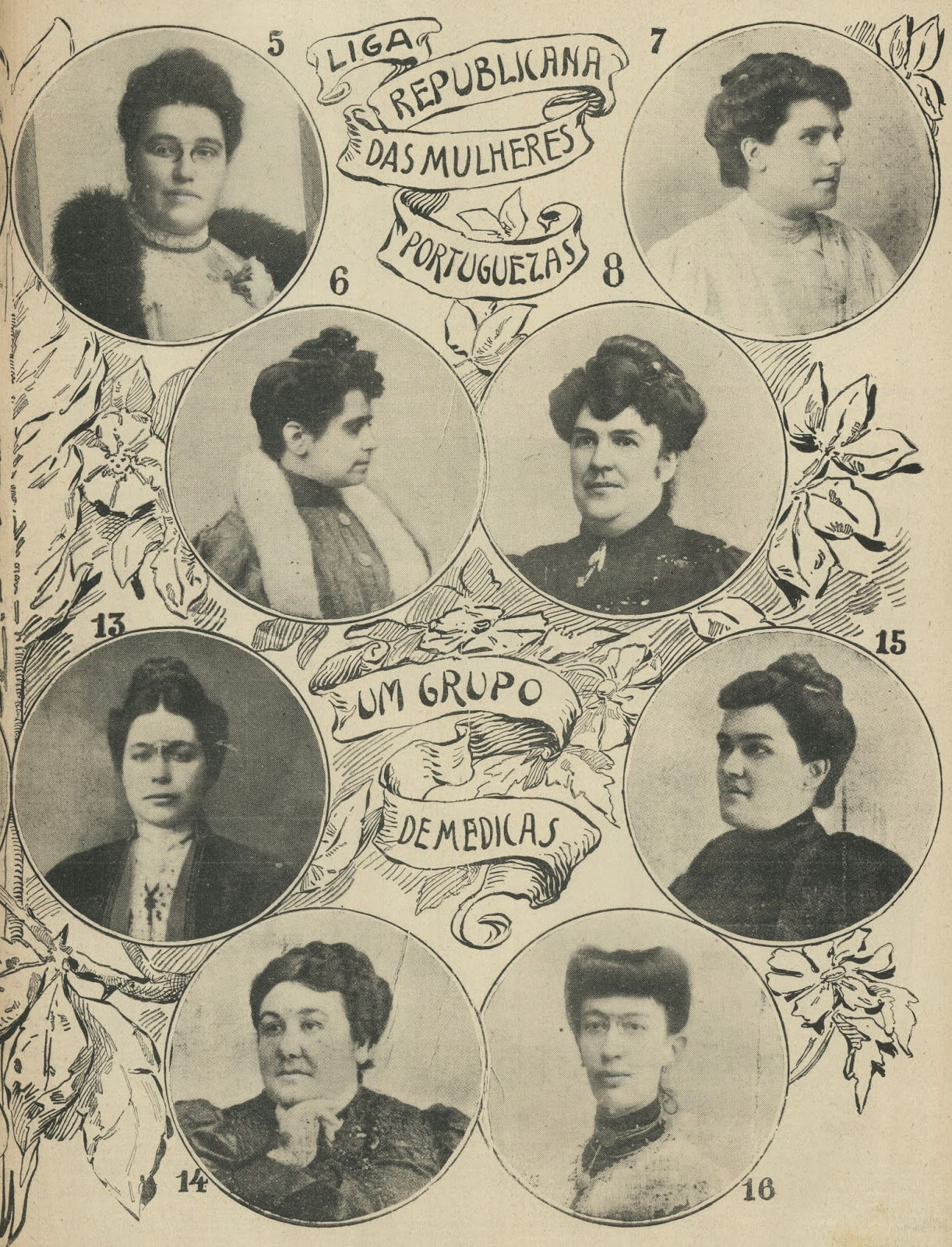
Supplement of the newspaper O Século on Portuguese suffragists, published on 12 May 1910. 5 – Ana de Castro Osório; 6 – Maria Veleda; 7 – Beatriz Paes Pinheiro de Lemos; 8 – Maria Clara Correia Alves; 13 – Sofia Quintino; 14 – Adelaide Cabete; 15 – Carolina Beatriz Ângelo; 16 – Maria do Carmo Joaquina Lopes.

During the last years of the Portuguese monarchy, one of the most important milestones of the feminist movement in Portugal in the 20th century was the foundation in 1907 of the Portuguese Group for Feminist Studies, directed by Ana de Castro Osório. Bringing together intellectuals, doctors, writers, journalists and teachers, it aimed to spread the ideals of women's emancipation. Although the association had a short existence, its activism gave rise to one of the most important Portuguese movements: the Liga Republicana das Mulheres Portuguesas (LRMP, Republican League of Portuguese Women, 1908–1919), supported by the Portuguese Republican Party, which demanded the right to vote, access to education and coeducation, work, management of property and divorce law, giving special emphasis to women's labor and legal rights. The league also carried out campaigns against and condemned femicide, domestic violence, prostitution, pimping and child begging, through initiatives such as the Obra Maternal and through its official press organs A Mulher e a Criança (The Woman and the Child, 1909–1911) and A Madrugada (The Dawn, 1911–1918).

==== First Portuguese Republic ====
After the establishment of the First Portuguese Republic, the suffragists active in the Liga Republicana das Mulheres Portuguesas presented their demands to the Provisional Government of the Portuguese Republic through two petitions calling for the immediate revision of the Civil Code, the approval of the divorce law and women's right to vote. Seeking not to provoke conflict with the government, they requested the vote only for women who paid taxes, were of legal age and belonged to the intellectual elite, which displeased some members of the movement and split it into two currents: a more conservative and minority wing led by founder Ana de Castro Osório, and a more radical and majority wing led by Maria Veleda, who believed that limiting the vote would worsen existing inequalities between Portuguese women and that suffrage should be universal. Due to this conflict, the Associação de Propaganda Feminista (APF, Feminist Propaganda Association, 1911–1918) was created by the more conservative militants who left the previous association, while still campaigning for women's rights.

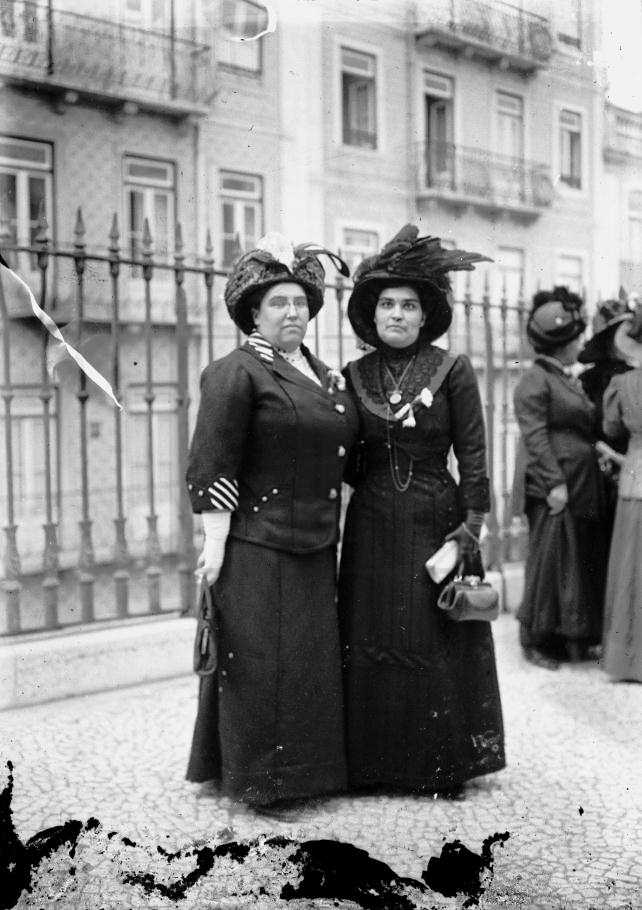
Ana de Castro Osório and Carolina Beatriz Ângelo in Lisbon (1911)

Without changes to the electoral law, in 1911 all Portuguese citizens over twenty‑one or heads of household who could read and write were voters, and the law did not specify the sex of the "head of household". Making use of this gap in legislation and outraged by the stance of various Republican Party members who did not want women to vote, Carolina Beatriz Ângelo, who met all the criteria as an adult, a doctor by profession, a widow and mother of a minor daughter, appealed to the courts to have her name included in the electoral register and shortly afterwards received a favorable decision from judge João Baptista de Castro. On 28 May of that year, the suffragist voted in the election to the Constituent Assembly, becoming not only the first woman to vote in Portugal but also in the Iberian Peninsula and throughout Southern Europe.

Although the event was celebrated and reported abroad, two years later the creation of the new electoral law of 3 July 1913 generated fierce division and controversy in parliament. Initially a version was presented in which the right to vote was granted to women over twenty‑five with higher, secondary or special education. Even with motions in favor of recognizing women's political rights by MPs José Jacinto Nunes, Amílcar Ramada Curto and Pedro Januário do Vale Sá Pereira, opponents of female suffrage defeated the proposals and the vote was explicitly limited to male Portuguese citizens, once again excluding women who had fought for this right since before the establishment of the Republic.

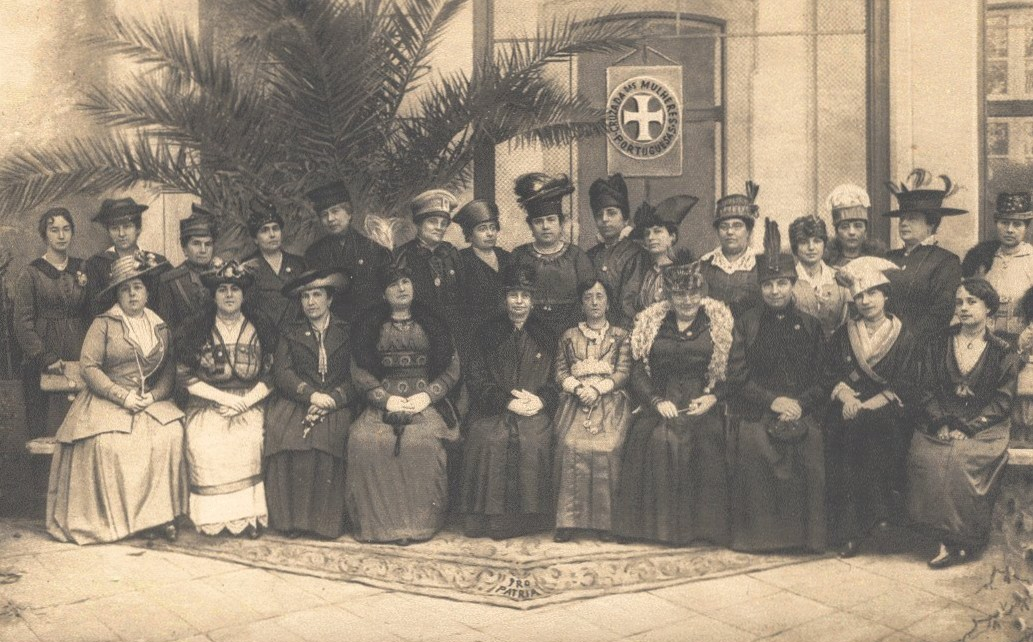
Members of the Cruzada das Mulheres Portuguesas

With the participation of the Portuguese Expeditionary Corps in the First World War, various republican, monarchist, feminist, trade unionist and conservative women joined for the first time with the aim of mobilizing women for the war effort and supporting soldiers sent to the front. They joined charitable movements such as the Comissão Feminina "Pela Pátria" (CMPP, Women's Committee "For the Fatherland", 1914–1916), founded by feminists Ana de Castro Osório, Ana Augusta de Castilho, Antónia Bermudes and Maria Benedita Mouzinho de Albuquerque Pinho, and the Cruzada das Mulheres Portuguesas (CMP, Crusade of Portuguese Women, 1916–1938), directed by First Lady Elzira Dantas Machado. In this context they organised fundraising campaigns, produced and distributed goods and supplies, supported soldiers' families and prisoners of war, and helped build hospitals for wounded and disabled soldiers, as well as creating the first nursing and other vocational courses to develop women's professional skills and secure the long‑sought economic autonomy.

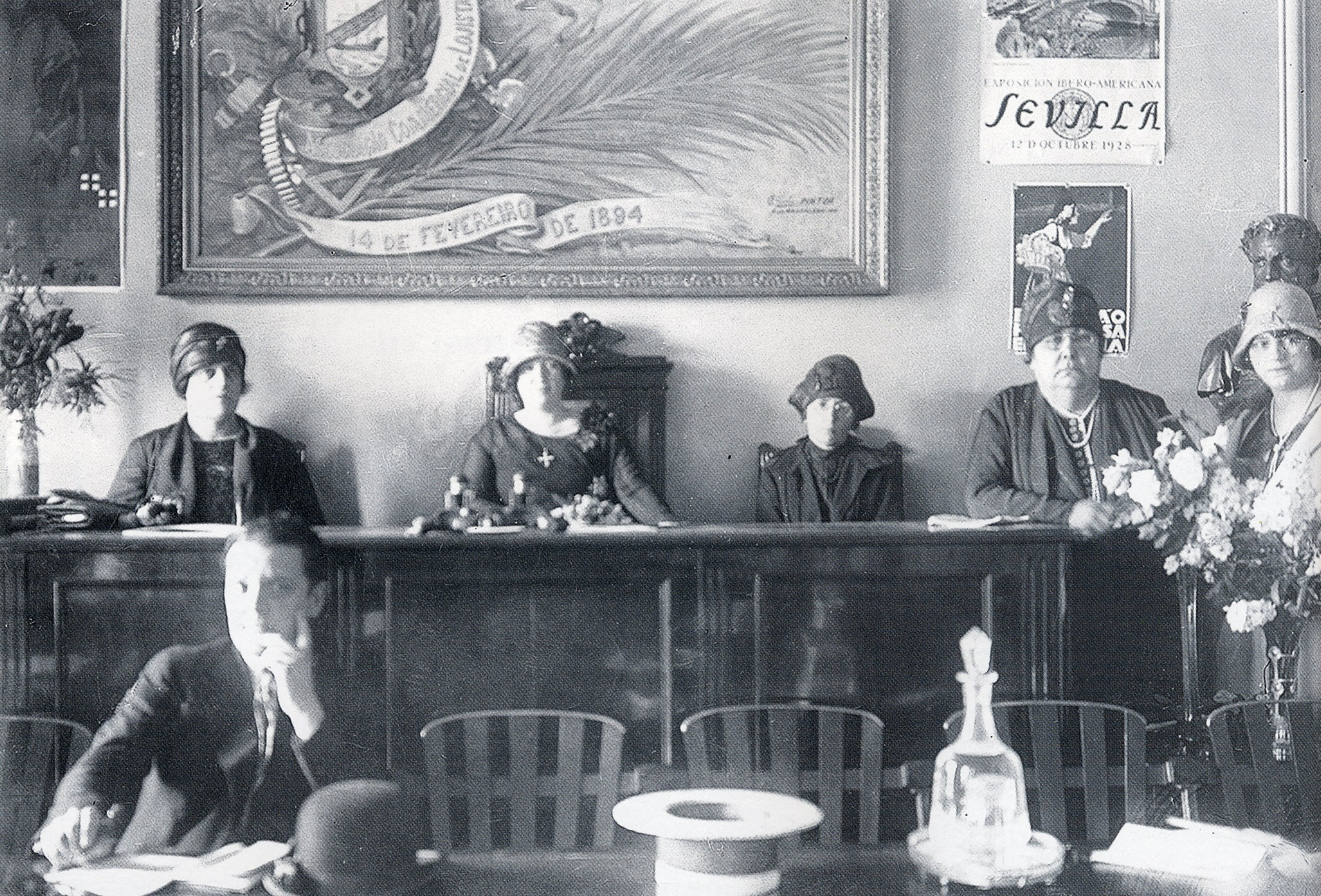
Feminist and Education Congress organised by the Conselho Nacional das Mulheres Portuguesas (Lisbon, 1928).

After the war, in a new era of female empowerment, the first Feminist and Education Congress was held from 4 to 9 May 1924 in the Great Hall of the Mutual Aid Association of Commerce Employees in Lisbon, organised by the Conselho Nacional das Mulheres Portuguesas (CNMP, National Council of Portuguese Women, 1914–1947), founded by Adelaide Cabete and affiliated with the International Council of Women (ICW). Considered the first feminist congress held in the country, the event had a major national and international impact, lasted five days, drew large audiences and press coverage, and presented twenty‑five papers, seventeen written by women, with support from other organisations and leading feminist figures of both sexes in Portuguese political, intellectual and cultural life. Domingas Lazary do Amaral, an Angolan educator, representative of the Liga Republicana das Mulheres Portuguesas in Luanda, member of the CNMP board between 1921 and 1927 and a key figure in the organisation of the Congress, presented the paper "Educação dos Indígenas nas colónias e suas vantagens" ("Education of Indigenous People in the Colonies and its Advantages"), becoming a pioneer in linking the colonial question with the feminist struggle.

Owing to the success of the congress, the same organisation held the second Feminist and Education Congress in 1928, where twelve papers were presented, all signed by women.

==== Estado Novo ====
During the 1930s, the dictatorship of the Estado Novo regime did not ignore the importance of women as a key element in the ideological formation and cohesion of the social fabric. Taking advantage of Portuguese society's conservative and religious values and led by António de Oliveira Salazar, the government used various ideological tenets to combat what it regarded as the most urgent threats to society: industrialization, communism, republicanism, trade unionism and feminism.

To educate society accordingly, various channels were used to disseminate these ideals. The ideological and doctrinal formation of women was implemented through state organisations such as the Obra das Mães pela Educação Nacional (OMEN, Work of Mothers for National Education), the female branch of the Mocidade Portuguesa (MPF) and the Movimento Nacional Feminino (MNF, National Feminine Movement), which operated in key social institutions to teach women, according to official doctrine, to better perform the traditional family roles assigned to their gender: daughters, wives and mothers. Later, in addition to these contents, the state's intervention turned to the importance of women in politics only with the outbreak of the Portuguese Colonial War, showing that regime organisations and political action bodies changed according to the policies of each period and that some disappeared with the regime itself because they could not adapt.

===== Policies of feminist repression =====
In line with the regime party's ideologies, the União Nacional (National Union), women's sphere of action was expected to be restricted to the home and family, considered the cradle of traditional values, the cult of the leader and nationalism. Implicit in this was that mothers should be educated to raise future generations and that their position was the cornerstone of the country's social and political order; this ideology was slowly implemented and normalized, not as something sexist or discriminatory but as a privilege through which "those without power reproduce state power".

Encouraging birth rates and excluding women from work

To reinforce these policies, biology also became a key element of service to the nation, with the legal system encouraging birth rates and excluding women from the labor market, undoing gains slowly achieved over more than a century by feminist men and women.

With the institutionalization of the Estado Novo, the Estatuto do Trabalho Nacional (National Labor Statute) was created to regulate working conditions and, in particular, women's work according to "special provisions in line with the demands of morality, physical protection, motherhood, domestic life, education and social welfare". Salazar popularized the slogan "A mulher para o lar" ("Women belong in the home"), embedded in the motto "Deus, Pátria e Família" ("God, Fatherland, and Family"), with the aim of turning women away from feminism and reinforcing the ideal that women who devote themselves entirely to their husbands, children and homes raise "worthy sons of the fatherland" and later educate them according to Catholicism and state values: "Educating is giving God good Christians, society useful citizens and the family loving children and exemplary parents". As in other European countries, campaigns were launched to boost birth rates and to encourage marriage through traditions such as the "Brides of Saint Anthony".

Women's employment until then had been concentrated mainly in the industrial sector, although they were also present, in smaller numbers, in other professions. The Estado Novo sought, within its scope of action, to hinder women's quest for independence and autonomy. In 1933, women were barred by law from entering the diplomatic service, the judiciary, senior positions in local government and posts in the Ministry of Public Works, Transport and Communications. Beyond bans in some professions, women were limited in others and forced to meet various bureaucratic and "moral" requirements: primary school teachers had to ask the Ministry of Education for permission to marry, while other professionals were forbidden to marry or be single mothers and had to give up their jobs if they did so, such as operators at the Anglo-Portuguese Telephone Company, secretaries at the Foreign Ministry, flight attendants at TAP or nurses in the civil hospitals.

Women also began to need their husbands' approval to work in jobs deemed suitable for their gender and, when forced to work by necessity and often as the family's sole support, their exclusion from certain professions led to exploitation and wages of around two‑thirds those of men performing the same roles. Reinforced by the Portuguese Constitution of 1933, which guaranteed equality before the law "except in matters related to sex, considering women's different nature and the good of the family", this social vision was far from ideal for Portuguese men and women and provoked protests in several parliamentary debates.

Only in 1967 was equality between men and women at work proclaimed. Women no longer needed their husbands' permission to engage in public activities or manage their intellectual property. Despite being enshrined in law, this change was not fully implemented in practice, and pay and labor inequalities between genders continued.

Education: "a workshop of female souls"

Recognizing the value of acculturation, the dictatorship invested for decades in schools based on nationalist principles, where a "minimum knowledge" was deemed sufficient for the "humble classes" while higher education was reserved for "future leaders". In this way, the Estado Novo created a vehicle for transmitting knowledge to mold future Portuguese generations in line with the regime's ideals, investing this idealization throughout the education system with core values of nationalism, religion, moralization, the cult of the leader, obedience to superiors, social immobility, corporatism and gender roles. A clear example of this indoctrination appeared in the first‑grade textbook, used for decades, which visually set out the "natural order" or sexual division of labor through illustrations of girls performing domestic chores inside the home and boys working in various occupations outside.

Guided by the idea that women required specific training and should be taught only by female teachers, in 1927 the regime introduced gender segregation in schools and a domestic science course in girls' education, including tasks such as "sewing, embroidery, cooking, doing the laundry, keeping the house clean, cutting and maintaining family clothes and learning about hygiene", as well as guidelines on how to create an "environment of comfort, order, tranquility and well‑being" in the home, along with handicraft classes that again focused on domestic skills.

Based on a vision of social stratification that it sought to control, the regime introduced various changes to primary education that harmed the less privileged classes and especially female pupils, such as revising and "lightening" curricula (1927) and reducing compulsory schooling from four years to three for girls (Decree no. 40964 of 31 December 1936).

===== Right to vote =====
Addressing women in a period of heightened tension, António de Oliveira Salazar was aware of the values instilled in devout and conservative women, with little education and knowledge of their rights and duties, making them more susceptible to submission.

On 5 May 1931, a decree was published allowing women from the elite who were heads of household or married with husbands absent in the colonies or abroad to hold positions in parish councils, and single, widowed, divorced or judicially separated women with secondary or higher education to vote in higher local and legislative elections. Legally, voting rights for women thus became possible in Portugal, as suffragists had demanded since the start of the century, but due to the many restrictions the decree excluded the vast majority of women. Two years later, the right to vote in parish council elections was extended to single women of age and emancipated women with their own family and recognized moral standing, and in municipal elections to emancipated women with secondary or higher education.

In 1934 electoral law recognized the right to vote and to stand for the National Assembly and the Corporative Chamber for women over twenty‑one who were single with income or in work, or married and heads of household with secondary education or who paid property tax. Even with these changes many women were still excluded from the ballot. That year three candidates stood for the National Assembly and one for the Corporative Chamber: the lawyer Maria Cândida Parreira, the doctor Domitila de Carvalho and the headmistress Maria Guardiola, all sharing traits such as belief in celibacy, loyalty to the regime, devout Catholicism and higher education.

===== Persecution and feminist resistance =====
Despite repression and censorship, the regime's policies triggered spontaneous revolts and organised movements for women's emancipation, and feminism became a constant obsession and concern of the Estado Novo.

In the 1940s organisations such as the Conselho Nacional das Mulheres Portuguesas were forced to cease activities by the Estado Novo. Suffragists and feminists were persecuted for their political ideas, imprisoned by the Polícia de Vigilância e Defesa do Estado and the Polícia Internacional e de Defesa do Estado in prisons such as the Mónicas Convent and Caxias, barred from working or forced into exile, as in the cases of Maria Lamas, author of As Mulheres do Meu País (The Women of My Country, 1948–1950), Cesina Bermudes, Deolinda Lopes Vieira, Maria Archer, Maria Palmira Tito de Morais, Maria Isabel Aboim Inglês and Maria dos Santos Machado, among many others.

Undeterred in their struggle, Portuguese feminists turned in subsequent years to other organisations and associations that continued to press for rights, such as the Associação Feminina Portuguesa para a Paz (AFPP, Portuguese Women's Association for Peace), dissolved by the Estado Novo in 1952, the Movimento de Unidade Democrática (MUD, Movement of Democratic Unity), outlawed in 1948, the Movimento Democrático de Mulheres (MDM, Democratic Women's Movement) which emerged from Women's Electoral Commissions in 1968, and clandestine movements such as the Movimento de Unidade Nacional Antifascista (MUNAF, Anti‑Fascist National Unity Movement) and others linked to the also banned and clandestine Portuguese Communist Party. They also took part in campaign committees supporting General Norton de Matos in 1948 and General Humberto Delgado in 1958 in presidential elections, in the name of democratization.

In 1972, the Portuguese writers Maria Isabel Barreno, Maria Teresa Horta and Maria Velho da Costa, known as "The Three Marias" and later founders of the Movimento de Libertação das Mulheres (Women's Liberation Movement), published Novas Cartas Portuguesas (New Portuguese Letters), which revealed to the world the acute discrimination in Portugal linked to dictatorial repression, patriarchal Catholic power and women's condition. The book was banned by censorship and the authors were charged with offending public morals. The case was only dropped and the authors acquitted after the 25 April 1974 Revolution.

==== Post‑1974 Revolution ====
After the Carnation Revolution of 25 April 1974, which ended the dictatorship in Portugal, the enshrinement of social, economic and political rights led to profound systemic change in Portuguese society. During the revolutionary process all restrictions based on sex were abolished, giving women access to previously barred careers and to universal suffrage as well as civil, legal and labor rights such as maternity leave, a national minimum wage and the abolition of the husband's right to open his wife's mail, among others.

The Civil Code was amended to guarantee effective equality between men and women.

=== 21st century ===
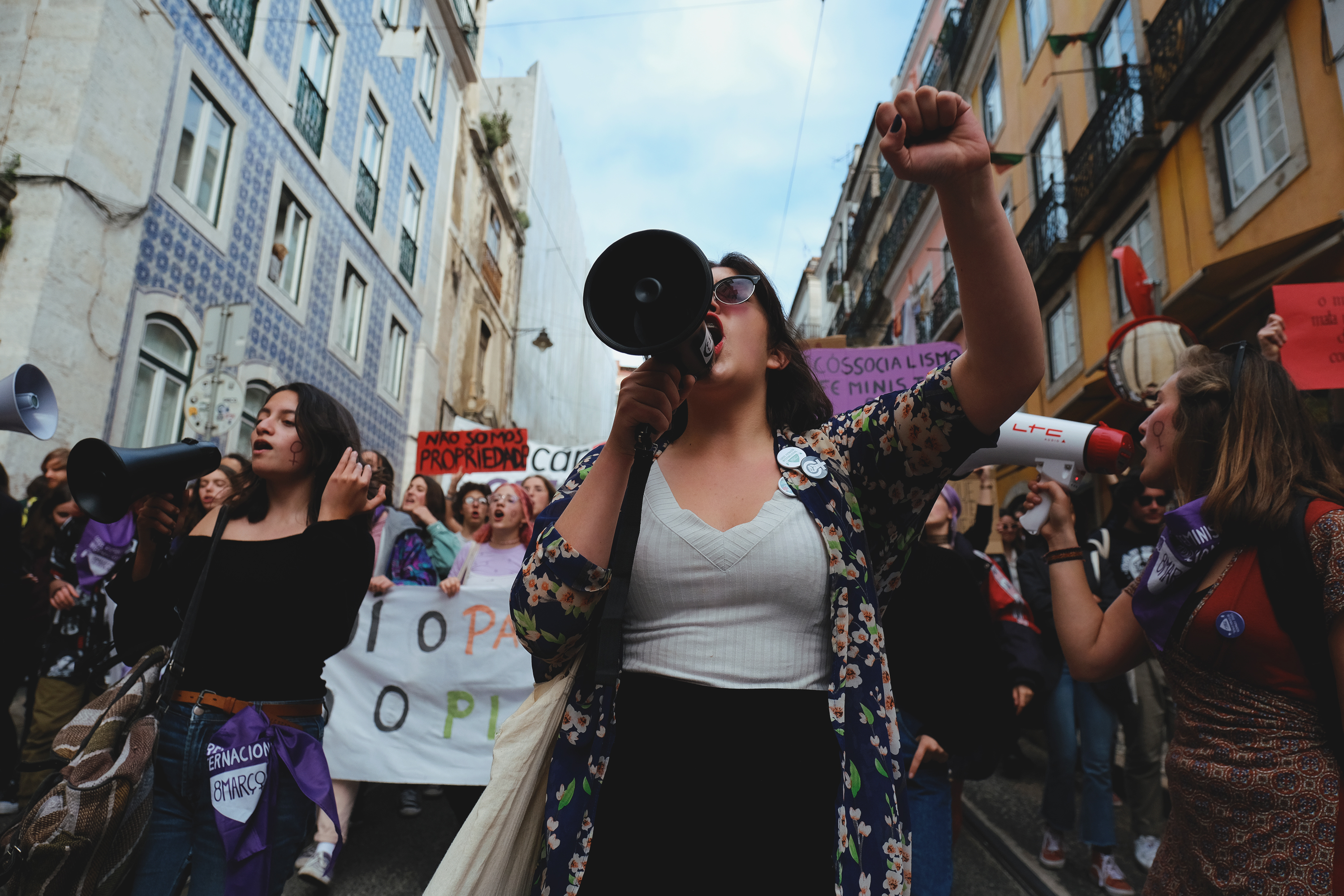
March of the Feminist Strike (Lisbon, 2020)

From 4 to 6 May 2004 many Portuguese feminists, academics, activists and researchers from different sectors gathered to celebrate the eightieth anniversary of the first feminist congress in Portugal, organised by the now extinct National Council of Portuguese Women. The event, held at the Calouste Gulbenkian Foundation in Lisbon, discussed issues such as voluntary abortion (then still illegal), sexuality and bodily autonomy, and persistent gender inequality in areas such as labor, and honored several women involved in securing women's rights, including Adelaide Cabete, Maria Veleda, Elina Guimarães, Maria Lamas, Maria Teresa Horta, Maria Isabel Barreno and Maria Velho da Costa.

In 2007, abortion in Portugal was decriminalized after a referendum vote.

In 2014, the feminist movement gained new momentum in Portugal with the creation of the online platform Maria Capaz, later renamed Capazes, which involved dozens of national public figures.

== See also ==
- History of feminism
- Women in Portugal
- Human rights in Portugal
