= Maria Palmira Tito de Morais =

Portuguese nurse, nursing teacher and activist

- Born: Maria Palmira de Macedo Tito de Morais; 24 February 1912; Lisbon, Portugal
- Died: 10 March 2003 (aged 91); Lisbon
- Occupations: Nurse and nursing teacher: World Health Organization employee
- Known for: Opposition to authoritarian Estado Novo Government

Maria Palmira Tito de Morais (1912 –2003) was a Portuguese nursing professor, World Health Organization employee, feminist, pacifist activist, and opponent of the Estado Novo dictatorship in Portugal. Due to her political activism, she was dismissed from her positions and barred from working for any state body in Portugal.

== Early life and training ==
Born in Lisbon on 24 February 1912, Maria Palmira de Macedo Tito de Morais was the daughter of Carolina de Antas de Loureiro de Macedo and Tito Augusto de Morais. Her father was a naval officer and an active member of the Portuguese Republican Party, who played a leading role in the 5 October 1910 revolution that overthrew the monarchy in Portugal, taking command of the warship São Rafael, which bombarded the Necessidades Palace, residence of the king. He would eventually become an admiral and also served as governor of Portuguese India. Her elder brother was the socialist leader Manuel Tito de Morais, one of the founders of Portugal's Socialist Party and its Secretary-General between 1986 and 1988.

Tito de Morais did not attend school beyond elementary level, being schooled at home. In 1935, at the age of 23, she completed a course in singing at the National Conservatory of Lisbon. Deciding to continue her studies, she chose to pursue nursing. However, the male tradition in nursing and the low level of female education in Portugal generally prevented the access of women to the nursing profession at that time and there were virtually no facilities for nurses' training in Portugal. She took advantage of a fellowship provided by the Rockefeller Foundation to study in the US. At the same time, two others were selected to study in the medical field: Jaime Pereira, for sanitary engineering and Maria Angélica Lima Basto for nursing. Her younger brother, Augusto, was also a Rockefeller beneficiary, studying at Harvard University.

Her fellowship was approved for the period of one year, starting on 1 September 1936 and later extended until 1939. In the summer of 1936, she spent time in the wards and surgery rooms of a hospital in Lisbon, visited the Ministry of Health to study its organization, and went to various locations to study the handling of epidemics, tuberculosis, and infant welfare, with the intention of being able to judge differences between what she saw in Portugal and what she would see in the US. She initially attended the Case Western Reserve University in Cleveland, Ohio but this did not provide the certification that would be accepted in Portugal and so in 1938 she transferred to the University of Toronto in Canada, where she obtained qualifications in public health nursing.

== Career ==
Returning to Portugal in September 1939, her qualifications gave her distinction in a country where few women had access to a similar education. She was appointed by the General Directorate of Health to join the founding team of the Lisbon Health Centre, an organization based on ideas developed in the US and supported by the Rockefeller Foundation, whose main objective was to revolutionize healthcare in poorer areas of the capital. A year later, she was appointed professor of public health nursing at the newly created Technical School of Nursing. There she contributed to several periodicals, writing articles about health education for newspapers and magazines such as Seara Nova, Gazeta Médica Portuguesa, and Os Nosso Filhos.

== Activism ==
With feminist, pacifist and anti-dictatorship views, Tito de Morais joined the Associação Feminina Portuguesa para a Paz (Portuguese Women's Association for Peace - AFPP) and the Movement of Democratic Unity (Portuguese: Movimento de Unidade Democrática - MUD), being invited to join the Women's Committee of MUD. In the following years she lived and worked alongside other activists such as Maria Isabel Aboim Inglez, Maria Lamas, Elina Guimarães, Maria da Graça Amado da Cunha, Maria Keil, Cesina Bermudes, Clementina Carneiro de Moura, Manuela Porto, Francine Benoît, Ilse Losa, Maria Barroso, Virgínia Moura and Stella Piteira Santos. She participated in the campaign for president of José Norton de Matos, from which he withdrew after it became clear that the results would be rigged by the Estado Novo. She also took part in protests against the state's political prisons.

== Political Persecution ==
Due to her known militancy, she was fired from the Lisbon Health Centre in February 1949, where she had been responsible for the administration of nursing services and the training of nursing students. A year later, Fernando de Andrade Pires de Lima, then Minister of National Education, announced that she was prevented from exercising any functions in any other state body, including the Portuguese Institute of Oncology. Despite the persecution, she was able to obtain a degree in historical and philosophical sciences from the University of Lisbon.

== Exile ==
During the 1950s, Tito de Morais was invited to work for the World Health Organization (WHO), carrying out, until 1972, several missions in different countries. In the mid-1950s she was offered a second fellowship by Rockefeller. At the time she was working in Rio de Janeiro at the WHO/ Pan American Sanitary Bureau and was concluding a survey on nursing resources and needs in Brazil. While studying she received a monthly allowance of US$250 and a pension for her family, which was dependent on her, probably because her father's opposition to the Estado Novo had led to the withdrawal of his pension. In 1959, she received a master's degree in social pedagogy from Columbia University in New York. She then continued to work for WHO, retiring at the age of 60. After this, she did consultancy work for the International Council of Nurses and others. She also published numerous articles in scientific journals.

== Return to Portugal ==
Tito de Morais only returned to Portugal definitively in 1977, after the Carnation Revolution of 25 April 1974. She was reinstated in her old position as professor at the Technical School of Nursing, a position she held until 1982, the year in which she officially retired from the Portuguese government, although she continued to do consultancy work.

== Awards ==
In 1980, she was made a Grand Officer of the Order of Prince Henry and in 1987 was awarded the rank of Commander of the Order of Liberty. In 1991, she received the Columbia University Teachers' College Alumni Association Award for her work in nursing education internationally.

== Death ==
Tito de Morais died on 10 March 2003, at the age of 91.
