= Maria da Graça Amado da Cunha =

Portuguese concert pianist, feminist and anti-fascist

- Born: Maria da Graça Faro Amado da Cunha; 24 November 1919; Lubango, Angola
- Died: 12 February 2001 (aged 81); Lisbon
- Occupation: Concert pianist

Maria da Graça Amado da Cunha (1919–2001) was a Portuguese classical pianist, best known for interpreting the works of the Portuguese composer Fernando Lopes-Graça. She was a feminist and an opponent of the right-wing Estado Novo regime that governed Portugal between 1933 and 1974.

== Early life ==
Maria da Graça Faro Amado da Cunha was born in Lubango (prior to 1975 known as Sá da Bandeira) in Portuguese Angola on 24 November 1919. At an early age she moved to Lisbon where she attended the National Conservatory, studying under the pianist José Vianna da Motta, the composer Luís de Freitas Branco and the French composer Francine Benoît. She became best known as a promoter of Portuguese music and as an interpreter of the piano compositions of the Portuguese composer Fernando Lopes-Graça. Although she retired from piano playing at a relatively early age, in the 1960s, she maintained a friendship with Lopes-Graça for over 50 years.

In 1942, she was a founder, together with Lopes Graça, Benoît and others, of the Sonata Society, which gave public concerts of Portuguese and other contemporary music until 1960, often giving first performances. The Society highlighted, in particular, works by female composers, such as Benoît, Berta Alves de Sousa and Elvira de Freitas. Lopes-Graça, Benoît and Cunha also founded the magazine Gazeta Musical (later Gazeta Musical e de Todas as Artes), in 1950. Cunha also published music criticism in magazines such as Seara Nova.

== Activism ==
Cunha married Roger D’Avellar, a pilot working for the Portuguese airline TAP Air Portugal. In 1961 she was painted by Abel Manta, one of the most prominent Portuguese modernist painters. The oil painting can be found at the National Music Museum in Lisbon. Manta was married to Clementina Carneiro de Moura, a member of the Associação Feminina Portuguesa para a Paz (Portuguese Women's Association for Peace - AFPP), as was Francine Benoît, and Cunha also joined this organization. Although declaring itself apolitical, many of the AFPP's members were anti-fascists opposed to the Estado Novo. She also became a member of the Movement of Democratic Unity (Portuguese: Movimento de Unidade Democrática - MUD), which was a quasi-legal platform of Portuguese democratic organizations that opposed the Estado Novo and was founded in October 1945.

In November 1946, the Committee of Writers, Journalists and Artists of the MUD delivered to the President of Portugal a petition protesting against censorship, indiscriminate imprisonment and the dismissal of academics and other teachers for their political views. The petition was signed by 200 men and just eight women: Cunha, Carneiro de Moura, Manuela Porto, Irene Lisboa, Alice Gomes, Maria Keil, Natália Correia, and Maria Barreira. In March 1947 she signed a letter to the Civil Governor of Lisbon, together with Keil, Cesina Bermudes, Maria Palmira Tito de Morais, Maria Valentina Trigo de Sousa and Elina Guimarães, on behalf of the MUD Lisbon Women's Committee, to protest against the use of political prisons, such as the Tarrafal camp in Cape Verde.

Maria da Graça Amado da Cunha died in Lisbon on 12 February 2001.

== Discography ==
Cunha produced two albums of piano music by Lopes-Graça:

- Maria da Graça Amado da Cunha Interprets Lopes-Graça. Vol. I. Eleven variations; eight bagatelles. Ed. PortugalSom/Strauss, 1996.
- Maria da Graça Amado da Cunha Interprets Lopes-Graça. Vol. II. Nine brief dances; Sonata No. 2; Variations on a popular Portuguese theme. Ed. PortugalSom/Strauss, 1996.
