= Maria Isabel Aboim Inglez =

Portuguese teacher, feminist and anti-fascist activist

- Born: Maria Isabel Hahnemann Saavedra; 7 January 1902; Lisbon, Portugal
- Died: 7 March 1963 (Aged 61); Lisbon
- Other names: Maria Isabel Hahnemann Saavedra de Aboim Inglez (or Inglês)
- Known for: Activities in opposition to the Estado Novo regime in Portugal.

Maria Isabel Aboim Inglez (January 7, 1902 – March 7, 1963) was a teacher, feminist, and campaigner against the authoritarian Estado Novo regime in Portugal. She was arrested for her political activities on three occasions.

== Biography ==
=== Birth and Family ===
Born Maria Isabel Hahnemann Saavedra on 7 January 1902, in Nova do Loureiro Street, in Bairro Alto, Lisbon. She came from a middle-class family, the daughter of Elisa Augusta Hahnemann and Juan Saavedra, also called João Saavedra. Her father, of Spanish origin but a naturalized Portuguese, was a republican and an atheist and his views seemed to have influenced those of his daughter. On her mother's side, her grandfather João Hahnemann, Águeda's railway station chief, had German and Portuguese ancestry, being related to the Majorats of São Jacinto and cousin to the doctor João Augusto da Cunha Sampaio Maia, 1º count of São João of Ver. She was the sister of Maria Cristina Hahnemann Saavedra de Sousa Marques and Delfim Hahnemann Saavedra.

=== Education ===
Raised in a bourgeoisie family, when Aboim Inglez was a child she was raised by her mother in the catholic faith, however, growing up in a house where politics and religions were themes of debate, when she was 14. Aboim Inglez identified herself as an atheist, just like her father. She studied in the Pedro Nunes Lyceum, where she took a complementary course of Letters.

=== Marriage ===
In college, she met Carlos Lopes de Aboim Inglez (1899-1942), future chemical and mine engineer, mason and antifascist activist, the son of António Lobo de Aboim Inglês (1869-1941), engineer and Agriculture minister during the First Portuguese Republic, and they married when she was 20. Moving after the marriage ceremony to Beja, where her husband worked, and then to Alcântara. They had five children: Maria Isabel Hahnemann Saavedra de Aboim Inglês; Maria Luísa Hahnmann Saavedra de Aboim Inglês, painter; Margarida Hahnemann Saavedra de Aboim Ingles, agronomist; Carlos Hahnemann Saavedra de Aboim Inglês (1930-2022), militant and leader of the Portuguese Communist Party, married to Maria Adelaide Dias Coelho de Aboim Inglês (1932-2008); and António Hahnemann Saavedra de Aboim Inglês.

=== Academic background ===
She did not resume her studies until after her fifth child was born, when she was 34, enrolling in the Faculty of Letters at the University of Lisbon, finishing her studies of Historical-Philosophical Sciences in 1936. Due to graduating with high marks, in that same year she was then invited by João António de Matos Romão to become his teaching assistant in Experimental Psychology at the university, however due to her children's ages and fearing she couldn't reconcile her education with the proposed job, she rejected the proposal. Two years later she submitted a thesis titled "The Influence of the Discoveries in Portuguese Society".

=== Professional career ===
In 1938, believing that education was the main weapon to mold the minds of the future, Aboim Inglez then started a school with her husband, Colégio Feminino Fernão de Magalhães (Ferdinand Magellan Women's School) in Lisbon, that promulgated a secular, progressive and social education, where you could find in the same class students of different sectors of the Portuguese society.

Three years later, in 1941, she was again invited to teach at the Faculty of Letters at the University of Lisbon, however this time by Francisco Vieira de Almeida, as an assistant in Ancient Philosophy and Psychology, Maria Isabel Aboim Inglês accepted the job, starting first as an assistant teacher and then becoming a full professor.

Invited by Francisco Gentil, between 1947 and 1949, she taught Sociology in the Technical Nursing School of the Portuguese Institute of Oncology.

=== Political activism and Feminism ===
A feminist and an antifascist, in the 1930s she became an active member of the National Council of Portuguese Women, an organization dedicated to the defense of social and political rights of women, led by the suffragist doctor Adelaide Cabete. She was also a member of the Associação Feminina Portuguesa para a Paz (Portuguese Women's Association for Peace -AFPP), militating alongside Virgínia Moura, Francine Benoît, Maria Lúcia Vassalo Namorado, Manuela Porto or Elina Guimarães, and supported the presidential campaigns of the general Norton de Matos, traveling the country speaking at election rallies in most major cities and giving speeches in popular assemblies, of the mathematician Ruy Luís Gomes, of the painter Arlindo Vicente and of the "General Without Fear" Humberto Delgado. She joined the Movement of Democratic Unity (MUD) in 1945, where she became the first woman to be on the Central Committee, also having become a member of the Women's Commission, the Solidarity Commission and the Central Commission of the Female National Democratic Movement, and of the National Democratic Movement in 1949.

=== Repression and Persecution by the Estado Novo ===
In March 1942 her husband died, making her a widow at 38 and with 5 children to raise, and due to her social and political activism, Maria Isabel Aboim Inglês started being repressed by the Estado Novo, having her name vetted by the Ministry of Education after being approved by the Council of the Faculty of Letters to teach History of Medieval Philosophy.

She continued to act and give speeches against the fascist regime, holding meetings with Bento de Jesus Caraça, Francisco Ramos da Costa, Luís Hernâni Dias Amado, Mário Soares, Maria Lamas, Gustavo Soromenho, Luís da Câmara Reys, Manuel Mendes, Mário de Azevedo Gomes, Maria Palmira and Manuel Alfredo Tito de Morais, among others, in her house, and was called "the indomitable" by the poet José Gomes Ferreira, even though she had the support of some professors that tried to appeal in her defense against the Ministry, in 1945 she was fired for political reasons by the Faculty of Letters and on December 13, 1946, she was arrested for the first time, being accused of being "a communist element", having been released on bail the next day.

In January 1948, when she was 46, Aboim Inglez was arrested again with other members of the Central Commission of the Movement of Democratic Unity, being accused of subversive activity and propaganda after more than 1500 pamphlets were distributed with the movement's propaganda. After being arrested for two months, she was freed.

The following year, due to her involvement with the Norton de Matos campaign and having been threatened by PIDE, she saw the Fernão de Magalhães Women's School get forcefully shut down and its diplomas annulled, forbidding it from being recognized as an education establishment in the country. During that time, her son Carlos Aboim Inglês and her daughter-in-law Maria Adelaide Aboim Inglês were arrested, leaving her granddaughter Margarida, then four years old, in her care, and her daughters Maria Luísa Aboim Inglês and Margarida Aboim Inglês were prohibited of working as teachers and civil servants, respectively. Unable to teach, she set up a dressmaker's workshop, gave private lessons, did translations, not signing anything under her name as she was afraid of being boycotted by the publishers.

In 1952 she was arrested again alongside the whole Central Commission of the National Democratic Movement.

During the trial of Isaura Silva, on July 15, 1954, Maria Isabel Aboim Inglês, that was present as a defense's witness, was threatened, after having protested against the presence of PIDE agents in the courtroom.

Having maintained contact with teachers, writers and journalists persecuted and watched by the fascist regime that fled to Brazil, like Manuel August Zaluar Nunes, Joaquim Soeiro Pereira Gomes, Manuel Rodrigues Lapa, Agostinho da Silva and Jaime Cortesão, in 1953 she was invited to teach Philosophy in a Brazilian university, however, the regime once again denied her passport's emission, informing her days after she auctioned off a big part of her belongings, being reported that António de Oliveira Salazar himself answered her appeal with the phrase: "She is a woman, she should sew socks".

In 1957, she was a member of the organizing committee for the candidature of Arlindo Vicente for the presidency of the Republic. After he withdrew in support of Humberto Delgado, she supported Delgado.

Years later, in 1958, while she testified for the defense of many political prisoners, she was fined for disrespect and arrested, receiving a three day sentence. In June 1959, her son, Carlos, was sentenced to 8 years in prison and, in 1960, she was beaten in Caxias prison when she went to visit him. For the 1961 national election she was invited to be on the list of opposition candidates, but her name was removed by the authorities because her political rights had been withdrawn earlier.

=== Death ===
Maria Isabel Aboim Inglez died on 7 March 1963, while she was behind the wheel of her car and was going from one of her student's house to another, and as she felt weak and debilitated, she pulled over in Alvalade, dying shortly after from a Cerebral embolism. Her son Carlos Aboim Inglez, that was arrested in the Peniche Fortress, was only informed of her death days after, so he was not able to attend her funeral. She's buried in the Cemitery of Benfica.

== Legacy and Tributes ==
Posthumously, after the Carnation Revolution, her name began to appear in the toponymy of several Portuguese municipalities, such as Sobreda (Almada), Alfornelos (Amadora), Pontinha (Odivelas), Belém (Lisbon) and Alhos Vedros (Moita).

On October 30, 1987, she was awarded, with the degree of Grand Officer of the Order of Liberty.
