= Francine Benoît =

Portuguese composer, music critic, music teacher, communist and anti-fascist

- Born: 30 July 1894; Périgueux, France
- Died: 27 January 1990 (Aged 95); Lisbon
- Other names: Francine Germaine Van Gool Benoît
- Occupations: Music teacher, composer and journalist

Francine Benoît (1894 – 1990) was a musician, teacher, composer, conductor, and music critic. She played an active role in Portuguese feminist organizations and was an opponent of the Estado Novo dictatorship, which ruled between 1933 and 1974. Born in France, she lived most of her life in Portugal and became a naturalised Portuguese citizen in 1929.

== Early life ==
Francine Germaine Van Gool Benoît was born in Périgueux in the Dordogne department of France on 30 July 1894, to a Belgian mother and a French father. Her father was an engineer and had already taken his family to Algeria, Belgium, Switzerland and Spain because of his work, when the family arrived in Portugal in 1906. They settled in Setúbal where her father had a job assembling machines for a fish-canning factory. She was first taught the piano by her mother, and also had private lessons, before studying the piano at the Academia de Amadores de Música in Lisbon. She later graduated with distinction in piano and harmony from the National Conservatory of Lisbon, where she was a student of Alexandre Rey Colaço. Benoît then returned to France to study composition with Vincent d'Indy at the Schola Cantorum de Paris between 1917 and 1918.

== Choirs and teaching ==
Back in Portugal, she was invited by Maria Rey Colaço to conduct the Choral Society of Lisbon (Canto Coral de Lisboa). This was the first of many choral groups that Benoît conducted. To support her mother and herself after her father's death in 1914, she also worked as a pianist at Lisbon's Olympia cinema, accompanying silent films. From 1920 to 1931, she taught at the Escola Oficina n.º1 in Lisbon. This school followed a different approach to teaching that aimed at the multidisciplinary preparation of students and the development of their critical spirit. The principal was César Porto. His daughter Manuela Porto, who also became a leading feminist, attended this school when Benoît was teaching there.

== Early activism ==
Benoît acquired Portuguese nationality in 1929. In 1932, she won an open competition for the position of teacher of solfège at the National Conservatory. However, her application, and the entire competition, were cancelled, on the grounds that Benoît had not had Portuguese nationality for more than five years, although there was nothing in the rules to indicate that this was a requirement. The post was subsequently re-advertised, with a deadline for the decision to be two months before Benoît achieved the required five years. She believed that her difficulties were for political reasons as she did not share the political views of the right-wing Estado Novo, which had come to power in 1926. She worked with the Portuguese Communist Party from 1933 and was an early member of the Associação Feminina Portuguesa para a Paz (Portuguese Women's Association for Peace - AFPP), directing the AFPP's children's choir and giving a talk to an AFPP conference on the subject of "modern music". The choir was formed in 1947 and made up of the children of the members. They rehearsed on Sunday mornings and performed at parties organized by the association.

== Teaching and lectures ==
After the disappointment of her failure to get a position in the Conservatory, she obtained a Diploma that enabled her to teach solfège, piano, composition, acoustics and the history of music, preparing students to apply to the Conservatory. When the director of the Academia de Amadores de Música died, she was invited to replace him as artistic director but was again prevented from doing so for political reasons. She did, however, succeed in obtaining teaching and lecturing positions at a wide variety of schools and colleges, and gave private lessons until the last days of her life. Her pupils included the pianist Maria João Pires and the composer Emmanuel Nunes. The lectures she gave addressed a wide range of topics, including biographies of composers and other aspects of the history of music. Her first public lecture, in 1919, was entitled "The Gregorian chant and the forms it gave rise to". She also broadcast radio programmes.

== Music criticism and composition ==
In the 1920s, Benoît also embarked on a career of music criticism. She first published in A Batalha, an anarcho-syndicalist magazine, then, in 1926, in the daily A Informação. In the same year, she began a collaboration with the evening newspaper, Diário de Lisboa, a relationship that would last for forty years. She also wrote for Jornal-Magazine da Mulher (Women's News Magazine), published by the Portuguese-Angolan feminist, Lília da Fonseca, and for the magazine, Os Nossos Filhos (Our children), published by Maria Lúcia Vassalo Namorado. In total, she wrote for over 25 different publications. She was also a prolific composer. The piano predominated in all her compositions, whether as a solo instrument, or as voice accompaniment. Many of her compositions were modern, in some cases being close to atonal, but she also composed music for children drawing on more traditional inspiration, such as the songs of Mozart and Beethoven. In 1942, she was one of the founders, together with the conductor and composer Fernando Lopes Graça and Maria da Graça Amado da Cunha, among others, of the Sonata Society, which gave public concerts of contemporary music. The same group founded the magazine Gazeta Musical in 1950.

== Later activism ==
Benoît joined the Movement of Democratic Unity (MUD), which was founded in 1945 as an umbrella organization for opponents to the Estado Novo, but was closed down in 1948, probably because it became dominated by the Communist Party. In 1948, she worked with the new Grupo Dramático Lisbonense (Lisbon Drama Group), an amateur group run by Manuela Porto that was largely made up of members of a MUD choir that had been formed by Fernando Lopes-Graça in 1945. In the late 1960s, she joined the Women's Democratic Movement (Movimento Democrático de Mulheres – MDM), which was founded in 1968 to protest against the ongoing wars in Portugal's colonies but subsequently developed into an organization in defence of women's rights, campaigning for equal pay for the same job, access for women to all professions, extending maternity leave, provision of free maternity care in hospitals and, later, campaigning for the decriminalisation of abortion. At MDM's First Congress in 1970, Benoît was elected to the National Council.

== Difficulties as a Lesbian ==
According to Helena Lopes Braga, Benoît was a lesbian. This made life in conservative Portugal very difficult, with condemnation coming from fellow communists as much as from the wider society. Her closest relationship was with Gabriela Monjardino Gomes. Given the difficulty faced by women seeking to lead an independent life Gomes, despite her sexual orientation, married Vitorino Nemésio, with whom she had four children. Benoît also had a relationship with Maria Albina Cochofel and children's author Madalena Gomes.

Benoît died on 27 January 1990. She was posthumously awarded the Portuguese Order of Liberty. Her name has been given to several streets and squares in Portugal. Her literary and musical estate was divided between the National Library of Portugal, the Academia dos Amadores de Música, and the Department of Musical Sciences, Faculty of Social and Human Sciences, NOVA University Lisbon.
