= Emmanuel Nunes =

Portuguese composer

Emmanuel Nunes (31 August 1941 – 2 September 2012) was a Portuguese composer who lived and worked in Paris from 1964.

== Biography ==
Nunes was born in Lisbon. A few months later he was diagnosed with athetosis. He studied composition, first from 1959 to 1963 at the Academia de Amadores de Música with Francine Benoît, and then with Fernando Lopes-Graça at the university (1962–64). He then attended courses at the Darmstädter Ferienkurse (1963–65), and in 1964 moved to Paris. A year later he moved to Cologne and enrolled at the Hochschule für Musik Köln, and studied composition with Henri Pousseur, electronic music with Jaap Spek, and phonetics with Georg Heike, while also taking courses with Karlheinz Stockhausen at the third and fourth Cologne Courses for New Music in 1965–66 and 1966–67.

In 1971 he was awarded the Premier Prix d´Esthetique Musicale in the class of Marcel Beaufils at the Conservatoire National Supérieur de Musique in Paris, in 1999 won the UNESCO Composition Prize, and in 2000 was the winner of the Pessoa Prize.

From the 1980s he took on teaching roles, amongst other places at the Gulbenkian Foundation in Lisbon, Harvard University in the US, at the Paris Conservatoire, and at the Darmstadt Summer Courses. From 1986 to 1992 he held a professorship in composition at the New Music Institute of the Hochschule für Musik Freiburg. Nunes was named an Officer of the French Order of Arts and Letters in 1986, and in 1991 was appointed Comendador da Ordem de Santiago da Espada by the President of Portugal. From 1992 until 2006 Nunes was Professor of Composition at the Paris Conservatoire.

Nunes died in Paris, two days after his seventy-first birthday. He was married twice and had a daughter.

== Selected compositions ==
Opera

- Das Märchen, Opera in a prologue and 2 acts (2007); libretto after Johann Wolfgang von Goethe

Orchestral music

- Fermata for orchestra and tape (1973)
- Ruf for orchestra and tape (1977)
- Chessed I for 4 instrumental ensembles (1979)
- Chessed II for 16 instrumental soloists and orchestra (1979)
- Sequencias for clarinet, 2 vibraphones, violin and orchestra (1982/1983–1988)
- Quodlibet for 28 instruments, 6 percussionists and orchestra, led by 2 conductors (1990–1991)
- Chessed IV for string quartet and orchestra (1992)

Chamber music

- Impromptu pour un voyage I for trumpet, flute, viola and harp (1973)
- Impromptu pour un voyage II for flute, viola and harp (1974–1975)
- Wandlungen for ensemble and live electronics (1986)
- Clivages I and II for 6 percussionists (1987–1988)
- Versus III for alto flute and viola (1987–1990)
- Lichtung I for clarinet, horn, trombone, tuba, 4 percussionists and cello (1988–1991)
- Chessed III for string quartet (1990–1991)
- La Main noire for 3 violas (2006–2007); after the opera Das Märchen

Solo instrumental

- Litanies du feu et de la mer I for piano (1969)
- Litanies du feu et de la mer II for piano (1971)
- Einspielung I for solo violin (1979)
- Einspielung II for solo violoncello (1980)
- Einspielung III for solo viola (1981)
- Ludi concertati No. 1 for solo bass flute (1985)
- Aura for solo flute (1983–1989)
- Improvisation II: Portrait for viola solo (2002)

Vocal music

- Machina Mundi for 4 instrumental soloists, choir, orchestra and tape (1991–1992)

== Bibliography ==
- Faust, Wolfgang Max. 1986. "Auf ein komplexes rhythmisches Urprinzip bezogen: Emmanuel Nunes im Gespräch (1979)". MusikTexte 15:5–8.
- Rafael, João. 1997. "The Fertile Development: An Analysis of Wandlungen of Emmanuel Nunes". Academiae Analecta: Mededelingen van de Kon. Academie voor Wetenschappen, Letteren en Schone Kunsten van België. 3: Klasse der Schone Kunsten 8, no. 2 (Summer): 33–55.
- Stoianova, Ivanka. 2002. "Offenheit als Raumwerden der Zeit: Der portugiesische Komponist Emmanuel Nunes". MusikTexte: Zeitschrift für Neue Musik no. 93:11–14.
- Szendy, Peter. 1993. "Réécrire: Quodlibet d'Emmanuel Nunes". Genesis: Revue internationale de critique génétique 4 (Ecritures musicales d'aujourd'hui): 111–33.
- Szendy, Peter (ed.). 1998. Emmanuel Nunes: Textes réunis par Peter Szendy. Compositeurs d'aujourd'hui. Paris: L'Harmattan. ISBN 2-85850-970-0; ISBN 2-7384-6250-2.
- Szendy, Peter. 1999. "Glossaire: En marge de deux textes d'Emmanuel Nunes (l'un présent, l'autre absent)". La loi musicale: Ce que la lecture de l'histoire nous (dés)apprend. Musique et musicologie: Les dialogues, edited by Danielle Cohen-Levinas, pp. 137–43. Paris and Montréal: L'Harmattan. ISBN 2-7384-8626-6.
- Szendy, Peter, and Brigitte Massin. 1989. "Entretien avec Emmanuel Nunes". In Musiques en création: Textes et entretiens, edited by Philippe Albèra, Vincent Barras, Jean-Marie Bergère, Joseph G. Cecconi, and Carlo Russi, 103–12. Geneva: Contrechamps. Reprinted 1997. ISBN 2-940068-10-0.
- Zenck, Martin. 1997. "Emmanuel Nunes' Quodlibet: Gehört mit den Ohren Nonos". Nähe und Distanz: Nachgedachte Musik der Gegenwart II, edited by Wolfgang Gratzer, 154–171. Hofheim: Wolke. ISBN 3-923997-67-1.

Footnotes
