= Associação Feminina Portuguesa para a Paz =

Women's pacifist organization in Portugal

- Portuguese Women’s Association for Peace
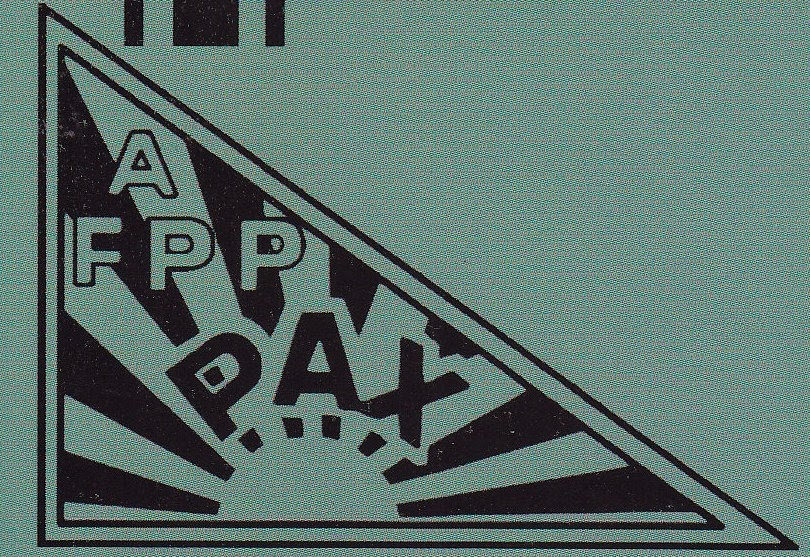
- Nickname: AFPP
- Formation: November 11, 1935; 90 years ago
- Founder: Multiple
- Founded at: Lisbon, Portugal
- Dissolved: 1952
- Type: Pacifist organization
- Purpose: Activism, support to wounded soldiers, and training of women
- Locations: Lisbon, Porto, Coimbra

The Associação Feminina Portuguesa para a Paz (Portuguese Women's Association for Peace - AFPP) was a female pacifist association created in 1935 and dissolved by the Esdado Novo dictatorship in 1952. It had active groups in Lisbon, Coimbra and Porto. Although declaring itself apolitical, many of its members were anti-fascists opposed to the Estado Novo. Its activities involved providing support to prisoners of war, and it organized lectures, exhibitions, and other events as a way to disseminate the principles of World Peace. In the last decade of its existence, it became increasingly opposed to the Government, in response to increased repression (general and, in particular, against women's movements). The Association published an occasional Bulletin and had a children's choir, directed by Francine Benoît.

== History ==
Created on 11 November 1935, to coincide with the Armistice of World War I, on which day many of its founder members attended a memorial ceremony, and approved by the Civil Government of Lisbon on 8 February of the following year, the Associação Feminina Portuguesa para a Paz (AFPP) was initially established in Lisbon by a group of twenty female activists who stated their concern about "constant threats that hover over the world and startle the hearts of all women. women - wives, mothers, daughters, sisters and brides - who would have to regret, once again, the fate of their loved ones". Branches were subsequently opened in Porto in 1937 and in Coimbra. Every year members of the AFPP would lay flowers at war memorials on 9 April, the anniversary of the Battle of La Lys, in which many Portuguese soldiers were killed.

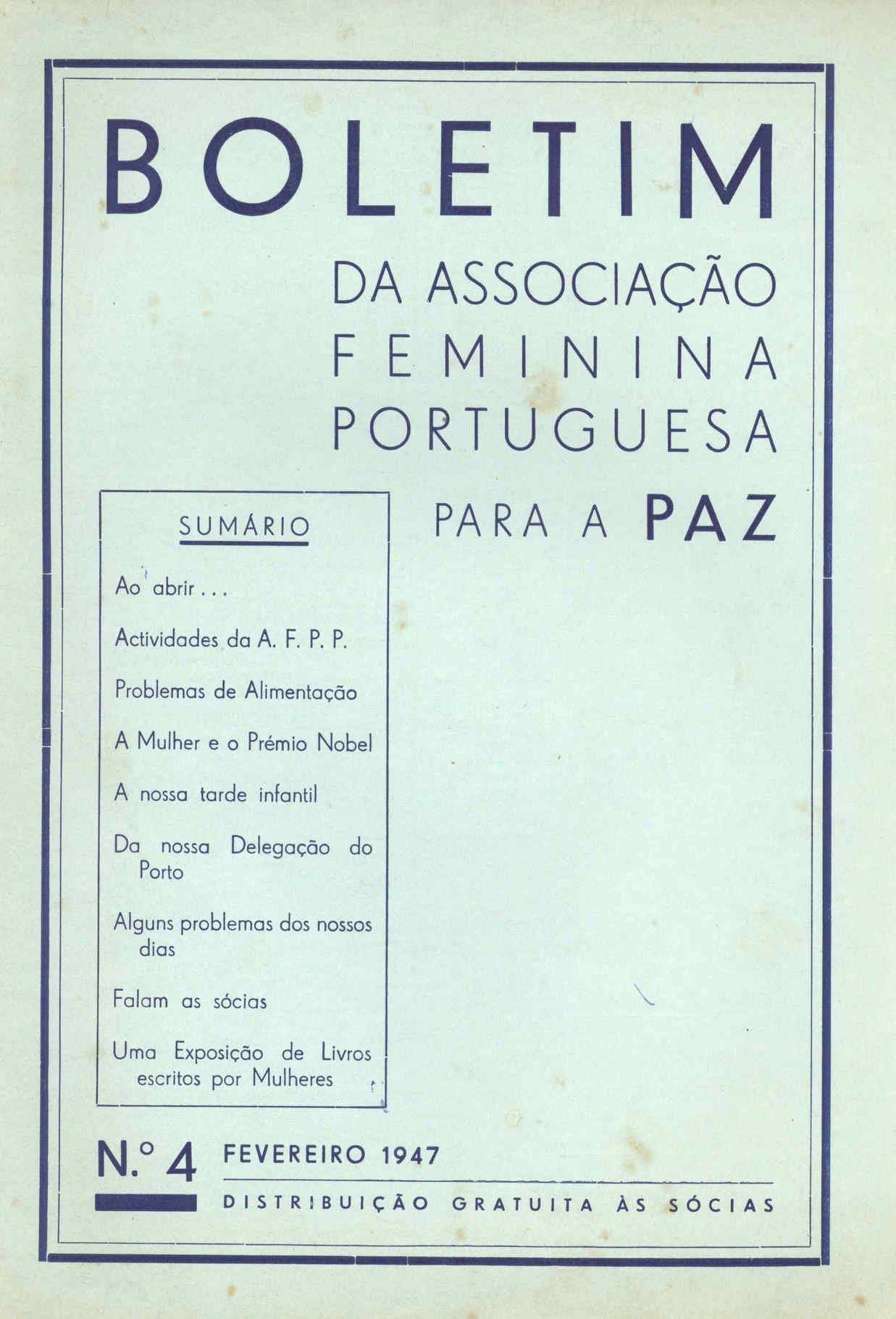
AFPP Bulletin from 1947

== Objectives and activities ==
Coinciding with the outbreak of the Spanish Civil War and in the aftermath of constant political crises in Portugal that marked the end of the First Portuguese Republic and the rise of the Estado Novo, the association initially took as its main objective the search for solutions to spread ideas of peace and human solidarity, "diverting the spirit of youth from warlike concerns". In late 1942 and early 1943, during World War II, AFPP contributed to the sending of supplies to prisoners of war and areas in France devastated by the conflict but, as Portugal was keen to remain neutral during the war, was forced by the Estado Novo to end such actions. It then decided to concentrate on developing the values of pacifism within the family, stressing that women, besides being mothers and wives, were also educators. This led its members to start to address the struggle for the improvement of the living conditions of women in all spheres of Portuguese society, covering equal rights and constitutional freedoms, as well as aiming to combat illiteracy, hunger, disease, and poverty. It also offered courses in literacy, typing, childcare, languages, accounting, first aid, and sewing, among others, while organizing conferences about poetry, education and health, holding children's parties, and running a children's choir, conducted by Francine Benoit.

== Closure by the Estado Novo ==
The AFPP attracted a wide range of views among its membership. Members included members of the Portuguese Communist Party, anti-fascist militants, and feminists. Most of its members were also affiliated to other democratic or suffragist movements, such as the Conselho Nacional das Mulheres Portuguesas (National Council of Portuguese Women - CNMP) and the Movement of Democratic Unity (MUD) (Portuguese: Movimento de Unidade Democrática or MUD). Many also worked on the presidential campaigns of Norton de Matos in 1943 and Ruy Luís Gomes in 1951. Some men also joined as associate members. The AFPP's growing politicization led to increasing restrictions being placed on it by the Estado Novo, finally leading to its closure in 1952, becoming the last major feminist organization to be closed down. After its closure many members lost their jobs or had difficulty finding work as the Government withdrew their academic qualifications. Some members continued to carry out the activities of AFPP after its closure, as individuals or as members of small groups. After the 25 April 1974 Carnation Revolution, which overthrew the Estado Novo, some past members wanted to reactivate the AFPP but a meeting held to discuss such a proposal rejected the idea because there was by then in existence the Conselho Português para a Paz e Cooperação (Portuguese Council for Peace and Cooperation -CPPC).

== Members ==
Members of the AFPP included:

- Maria Isabel Barreno
- Virgínia Moura
- Maria Lamas
- Stella Piteira Santos
- Maria dos Santos Machado
- Francine Benoît
- Maria Isabel Aboim Inglez
- Ilse Losa
- Irene Lisboa
- Maria Alda Nogueira
- Cândida Ventura
- Maria Lúcia Vassalo Namorado
- Manuela Porto
- Maria da Graça Amado da Cunha
- Maria Lucília Estanco Louro
- Elina Guimarães
- Clementina Carneiro de Moura
