= Manuela Porto =

Portuguese actress, writer, translator and feminist

- Born: 28 April 1908; Lisbon, Portugal
- Died: 7 July 1950 (aged 42); Lisbon, Portugal
- Occupations: Actor, writer, journalist, translator
- Notable work: Uma ingénua: a história de Beatriz: novela

Manuela Porto (24 April 1908 – 7 July 1950) was a Portuguese actor, writer, journalist, theatre critic, and translator, as well as a leading campaigner for women's rights and an opponent of the Estado Novo dictatorship in Portugal. As a translator she introduced previously untranslated women writers to Portuguese readers, including Louisa May Alcott, Anne Bronte, Elizabeth Gaskell, and Virginia Woolf. She is also credited with popularising the work of the Portuguese poet, Fernando Pessoa.

== Early life ==
Manuela Porto was born on 24 April 1908 in the Portuguese capital of Lisbon, where she lived all her life. Her father was César Porto, a republican, journalist, writer, playwright, essayist, translator and teacher. He was Principal of Escola Oficina No. 1, a school located in Lisbon, which, at the beginning of the 20th century, followed a different approach to teaching that aimed at the multidisciplinary preparation of students and the development of their critical spirit. His daughter attended this school. Her father also founded and edited the magazine Educação Social, which promoted the type of education practised at his school.

== Acting career ==
Porto's first exposure to theatre was at a Theatre School (Escola-Teatro) run by Araújo Pereira, with the collaboration of her father. In 1931 she married Araújo Pereira's son, Roberto de Araújo Pereira (1908–1969), in a civil registry. He was an artist who, like her, had not been baptised by the church. The marriage agreement called for a "whole, complete and absolute separation of assets", a radical concept at the time. Porto started her acting career with the Escola-Teatro in November 1924 in The Sisters, by Gaston Dévore, a play with only female roles. Her first performance in the professional theatre was in November 1926 as a member of the Rey Colaço – Robles Monteiro theatre company, in the role of a nun in A petiza do gato, by Carlos Arniches.

After several further performances, none in a leading role, Porto decided to enter the National Theatre Conservatory. After graduation in 1931, with top marks and a prize, she was in two plays performed by the Grande Companhia Dramática Portuguesa (Great Portuguese Dramatic Company), before withdrawing from the theatre, complaining of "unscrupulous businessmen and ignorant artists". There is little information about her activities between 1932 and 1941: it appears that she mainly devoted herself to giving poetry recitals. She briefly returned to the stage for just one show to play Hermia in A Midsummer Night's Dream by William Shakespeare. It is likely that this return was in response to a request from Amélia Rey Colaço. Possibly, the opportunity to perform in that play and the fact that it was performed outdoors and not in what she considered to be the oppressive confines of the theatre, also contributed to her decision.

== Opposition to the Government ==
Unhappy with the Estado Novo, many artists took an active stance against the regime, joining opposition organizations and signing protests against measures taken by the dictatorship. Manuela Porto joined the Movement of National Antifascist Unity (Portuguese: Movimento de Unidade Nacional Antifascista or MUNAF), an organization that was created in 1943 but never legalized. In 1945 she joined the Movement of Democratic Unity (Portuguese: Movimento de Unidade Democrática or MUD), a quasi-legal platform of democratic organizations that was banned in 1948, not before several members had been arrested. Porto was also a member of CEJAD, the Commission of Democratic Writers, Journalists and Artists (Comissão de Escritores, Jornalistas e Artistas Democráticos) and the Associação Feminina Portuguesa para a Paz (Portuguese Women's Association for Peace). She was on the Central Commission of the Women's National Democratic Movement (Movimento Nacional Democrático Feminino), a legal organization founded after the presidential campaign of Norton de Matos in 1949.

Like many intellectuals of the time, Porto contributed to several newspapers and magazines, some dedicated to the arts, such as Mundo Literário, Vértice, and Seara Nova, as well as daily papers such as Diário de Lisboa, and magazines aimed at women, such as Eva. Censorship, however, made it difficult for many artists to fully express themselves in public and they often organized informal gatherings to exchange ideas. Porto was particularly appreciated for her recitals, being able to deliver long poems from memory, such as Ode Marítima by Fernando Pessoa's heteronym Álvaro de Campos.

== Translations ==
Porto translated Histoire du théâtre by Robert Pignarre, signing it solely with her initials, as well as one or two other books written by men. However, women were central to most of her literary work, whether as a translator of the female authors Louisa May Alcott, Anne Brontë, Elizabeth Gaskell, Hazel Goodwin Keeler, Katherine Mansfield and Virginia Woolf, as a portrait writer on Virginia Woolf, Katherine Mansfield, Dorothy Parker, Judith (Judite) Navarro and Maria Amália Vaz de Carvalho, or in her own stories. She published Um filho mais e outras histórias (1945), Uma ingénua: a história de Beatriz: novela (1948) and Doze histórias sem sentido (posthumously in 1952). As Marques notes, the main characters in almost all her stories undergo considerable suffering: they are beaten by their fathers, cheated on and abandoned by the husband, experience the death of a child, or cannot follow the career they want.

== Later life ==
In January 1947 Maria Lamas of the Conselho Nacional das Mulheres Portuguesas (National Council of Portuguese Women) organized an exhibition of books written by women. This brought together three thousand books by 1400 female authors from thirty countries, which filled the Great Hall of Fine Arts at the University of Lisbon. As part of this, Porto gave a lecture entitled Virginia Woolf: the problem of women of letters. The exhibition led to the closure by the dictatorship of the National Council of Portuguese Women on 28 June of the same year.

Although Porto effectively ceased professional acting in 1932, she did not, however, end her involvement with the theatrical world. She was a theatre critic between 1946 and 1950, writing not only reviews of shows but also opinion pieces on the state of the theatre in Portugal. The central character of her novel, Uma ingénua: a história de Beatriz, is an actress and Porto uses the novel to repeat many of her earlier criticisms of the Portuguese theatre. In 1948 she formed the Grupo Dramático Lisbonense (Lisbon Drama Group), an amateur group that was largely made up of members of a MUD choir that had been formed by the conductor and composer Fernando Lopes-Graça in 1945. Few of the members had any theatrical or musical training. Porto directed the performances, while her husband was responsible for the scenery and costumes. She also campaigned for more support to be given to amateur dramatics.

== Death ==
Porto committed suicide on 7 July 1950 with an overdose of barbiturates. It was not the first time that she had tried to do so. The suicide was not reported at the time as reports of suicides were censored by the Estado Novo. It was said that she “died at home” but in fact she died in hospital.

== Memorials ==
- The Teatro da Cornucópia (also known as the Teatro do Bairro Alto) in Lisbon has one of its rooms named after Porto.
- Two streets and two small squares in the Lisbon District are named after her.
