= Elvira de Freitas =

Portuguese musician and music teacher (1927-2015)

- Born: Elvira Manuela Fernanda de Freitas; 8 June 1927; Lisbon, Portugal
- Died: 27 June 2015 (aged 88); Lisbon
- Known for: Composing, conducting and radio broadcasts

Elvira de Freitas (1927 – 2015) was a composer, a pianist, and one of the first female orchestral conductors in Portugal.

== Early life and training ==
Elvira Manuela Fernanda de Freitas was born in Lisbon on 8 June 1927. She was the daughter of the composer and conductor, Frederico de Freitas. At the age of 17 she entered the National Conservatory of Lisbon, studying piano with Lourenço Varela Cid and composition with Jorge Croner de Vasconcelos and with António Eduardo de Costa Ferreira, who had also been her father's teacher. She later studied for four years with Fernando Lopes-Graça. Granted a scholarship from the French government in 1958 and from the Calouste Gulbenkian Foundation in 1959, she continued her studies at the École Normale de Musique de Paris with Nadia Boulanger and at the Conservatoire de Paris with Olivier Messiaen.

== Career ==
From 1957, De Freitas taught at the Camões Secondary School, one of the most-prestigious schools in Lisbon. Between 1974 and 1978 she taught at the music school of the National Conservatory and from 1978 she taught at the Gregorian Institute of Lisbon.

As a composer, she won five first prizes in competitions, with the first, at the age of 28, being for the Marcha do Bairro Alto. This won first prize in the Lisbon Marching Competition, promoted by the national radio station, Emissora Nacional, and became very popular. It led to her being invited by Emissora Nacional to perform monthly programmes for which she would compose music and then conduct the orchestra performing it. She also played the piano on radio. She stayed with the Emissora Nacional for twelve years, with a repertoire based on Portuguese folk melodies and her compositions of light music.

As well as pieces of light music, De Freitas composed songs based on poems by renowned Portuguese poets, such as Fernanda de Castro, Alberto Seroa and Sebastião da Gama as well as the French poet, Paul Verlaine and the Spanish poet Federico Garcia Lorca. Her corpus also included pieces for piano, orchestra, and ballet. As a high school singing teacher she produced several pieces of choral music, as well as a cantata. Together with her father, she won a prize for a requiem mass.

In addition to performances on the radio, the works of De Freitas were performed in most of Lisbon's leading theatres, including the Teatro Nacional de São Carlos, the D. Maria II National Theatre, Teatro da Trindade, and the Teatro Avenida. Her work was also performed on radio stations outside Portugal.

== Compositions ==
Among the most notable of the works by De Freitas are:

- Sonata for piano (1951)
- My Boys’ Christmas, radio poem for narrator and orchestra
- The Inheritance for voice, piano, oboe, trumpet and drums
- Bandarra's Prophecies, a play in two acts by Almeida Garrett
- The Enchanted Forest (premiered at the D. Maria II National Theatre)
- Requiem Mass (1975)
- Eleven poems of Garcia Lorca for voice, guitar or piano

== Death ==
De Freitas died in Lisbon on 27 June 2015. She was buried at the Lumiar cemetery in Lisbon.
