= Virgínia Moura =

Anti-government campaigner and political prisoner in Portugal

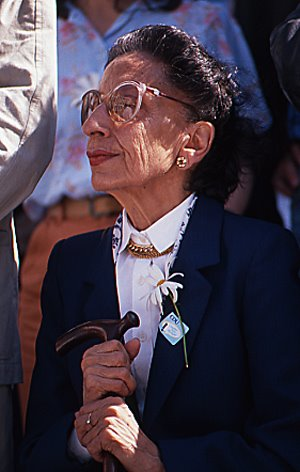
- Virgínia Moura, 1988
- Born: Virgínia de Faria Moura; 19 July 1915; Guimarães, Portugal
- Died: 19 April 1998 (aged 82); Porto, Portugal
- Occupation: Civil engineer
- Years active: 50
- Known for: Communist opponent of authoritarian Estado Novo Government; Political prisoner
- Political party: Portuguese Communist Party (PCP)

Virgínia Moura (19 July 1915 – 19 April 1998) was a Portuguese anti-government activist and feminist, opposed to the authoritarian regime known as the Estado Novo. As a member of the Communist Party, she was arrested on 16 occasions for her activities. She was the second Portuguese woman to qualify as a civil engineer.

== Early life ==
Virgínia de Faria Moura was born on 19 July 1915 in São Martinho do Conde, in the Guimarães municipality, in the Braga district of Portugal. Her mother, a primary school teacher, was unmarried. At this time in conservative Portugal there was a considerable stigma attached to unmarried mothers. Moura indicated that she was aware of this from an early age, as her extended family cut off contact with her mother. Schoolmates were forbidden to invite her to their homes and even at university she felt marginalised. She indicated that this stigma was a factor in the development of her revolutionary approach. Nevertheless, her mother was accepted by enough people in the community that she could earn a living teaching children during the day and their parents at night, in a part of Portugal where adult illiteracy was high.

Moura attended secondary school in Póvoa de Varzim. At the age of 15 she took part in a student strike to protest against the murder of a young student, allegedly committed by the police. Three years later she joined the Portuguese Communist Party (PCP) and worked with the Socorro Vermelho (Red Assistance), an organization devoted to supporting political prisoners in Portugal and Spain. At this time she met the then architecture student António Lobão Vital, who would be her companion for 42 years until his death. In 1935, Vital was arrested for finding jobs for two Spanish refugees and was stopped from finishing his studies. Later, he did manage to graduate as an architect. Moura graduated from the Faculty of Engineering of the University of Porto in 1948 becoming only the second Portuguese woman to qualify as a civil engineer (Maria Amélia Chaves was the first in 1937). However, she could not obtain a job in the Civil Service, since she was already on police records as an opponent of the Estado Novo. Private engineering projects that she carried out were signed by others. She also studied Mathematics and Humanities, at the University of Coimbra and University of Porto, and in a private capacity carried out some teaching.

== Opposition to the Estado Novo ==
From 1944 Moura was an active participant in the struggle against the Estado Novo. She was a member of the Movement of National Antifascist Unity (MUNAF), which was a political platform of groups opposed to the government that was strongly influenced by the Communist party; the Movement of Democratic Unity (MUD), which played a similar role; and the National Democratic Movement (MND), which supported opposition candidates for the National Assembly. She was also active with the National Council of Portuguese Women and the Associação Feminina Portuguesa para a Paz (Portuguese Women's Peace Association). The latter was dissolved by the Estado Novo in 1952. In an environment where women were subordinated to their husbands and in some cases still could not vote, and in a country which had the highest child mortality in Europe, women and their status in Portugal was a common theme of Moura's work. Her "Letter to a Modern Woman" (Carta a Uma Mulher Moderna) was a call to women to participate actively in political life.

First arrested on 17 December 1949, Moura was tried for "treason to the Motherland" in 1951, for having signed a declaration that demanded that President Salazar negotiate with the Indian government regarding the Portuguese colonies of Goa, Daman and Diu. In total, she was arrested sixteen times by the PIDE, the Portuguese secret police, prosecuted nine times, convicted three times and also repeatedly assaulted by the police. The last arrest was in 1962. She became well-respected in Porto to the point that in 1950 women in Bolhão Market went on strike to demand her release from prison. At a trial in 1952 messages of support from Eugénie Cotton, a French scientist and President of the Women's International Democratic Federation, and Irène Joliot-Curie, daughter of Pierre and Marie Curie and President of the World Peace Council, were read out in court.

She, herself, was held in prison in Porto, in PIDE offices, and in Lisbon's Caxias Prison. Senior male Communist party members were also held in the Peniche Fortress, and Moura organised a protest by wives of political prisoners against the harsh conditions in which they were kept.

Moura supported the Presidential campaigns of Norton de Matos in 1949, of Ruy Luís Gomes in 1951, and of Humberto Delgado in 1958 and was a charismatic speaker at public meetings. She became a member of the Central Committee of the PCP and remained in hiding, but also found time to write newspaper and magazine articles under the pseudonym of "Maria Selma". She was a founder of a magazine called O Sol Nascente (The Rising Sun). As an editor she was fined for having edited a book, Palavras necessárias (Necessary words), by the communist, Bento António Gonçalves.

== After the Carnation Revolution ==
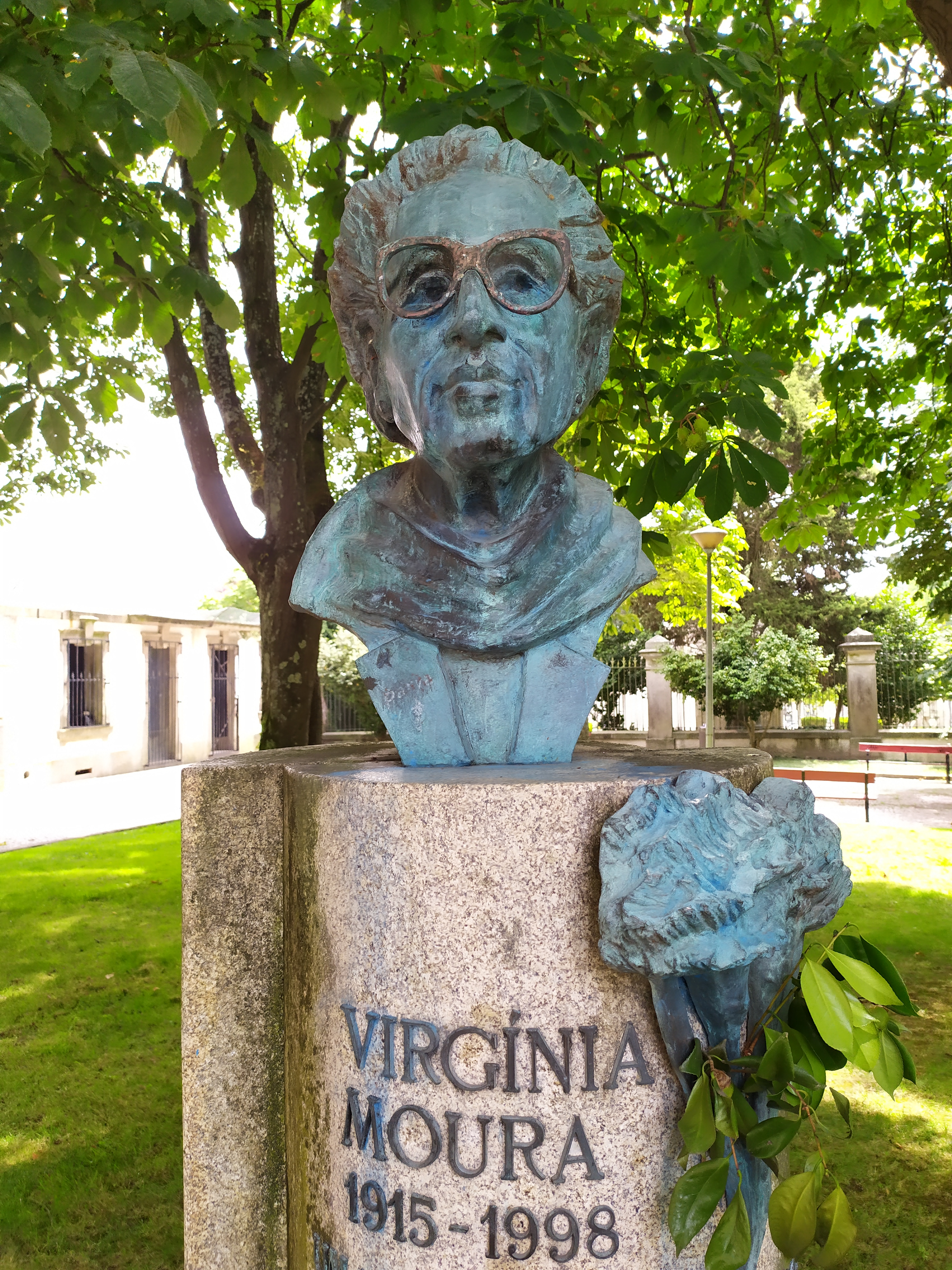
Bust of Virgínia Moura in Porto, Largo Soares dos Reis

The Carnation Revolution took place on 25 April 1974, resulting in the overthrow of the Estado Novo. On April 26, she was invited by the Armed Forces Movement (MFA), which had instituted the peaceful Revolution, to accompany them in the release of political prisoners at the PIDE headquarters, in Porto. Inside, "some terrified agents burned all the papers they could". After April 25 she continued her political activity as a member of the PCP and stood for election on several occasions, being elected to the councils of both Porto and Gondomar. In 1985 she was made a Grand Officer of the Order of Liberty (Portuguese: Ordem da Liberdade). This was followed by the receipt of the Medal of Honor from Porto City Council in 1988.

Virgínia Moura died on 19 April 1998, in Porto. The funeral of the lady known as the "Passionate Portuguese" was attended by thousands.

In 1999, a bust of Virgínia Moura, by the sculptor Manuel Dias, was inaugurated. The sculpture was placed in front of the building where the political police were based when she was arrested for the first time and was unveiled 50 years after that first arrest.

In Guimarães a group of schools bears her name and a street has been named after her, as have roads in several other locations throughout Portugal.
