= Lília da Fonseca =

Maria Lígia Valente da Fonseca Severino (May 21, 1906 – August 14, 1991) was a Portuguese and Angolan feminist journalist and writer. She used the pseudonym Lília da Fonseca in her writing. She was the first woman to join a candidate list in legislative elections for Portugal's Assembly of the Republic, in 1957.

== Biography ==
Maria Valente da Fonseca was born in 1906 in Benguela, Angola, to an Angolan mother and European father. She moved to Portugal when she was very young and studied at the Liceu Infanta D. Maria in Coimbra and the Escola Carolina Michäelis in Porto.

She then returned to Angola, settling in Luanda, where she worked as a journalist for the newspaper A Província de Angola. She continued to write for the publication later in her life, when she returned to Portugal.

Her first novel, Panguila, was published in 1944 under the name Lília da Fonseca. The book paints a faithful portrait of society in colonial Benguela at the time.

In November 1945, she signed a manifesto of intellectuals protesting against "all kinds of limitations" placed on intellectual activity by the regime. She was also involved in anti-war efforts, signing the Manifesto Pela Paz entre as Nações ("For Peace Among Nations").

In 1950, she founded the magazine Jornal-Magazine da Mulher ("Women's Newsmagazine") in Lisbon, and she served as its editor until the last issue, in 1956. She also founded the Suplemento Literário Mãos de Fada: Revista de lavores femininos ("Fairy Hands Literary Supplement: Magazine of Women's Labor") and worked on the feminist magazine Os Nossos Filhos ("Our Children"), which offered an alternative educational curriculum in opposition to the Estado Novo regime's.

In 1957 she was an opposition candidate in legislative elections for Portugal's Assembly of the Republic, becoming the first woman named to an electoral list.

Fonseca went on to found a puppetry group, the Teatro de Fantoches de Branca Flor. The group performed in schools, at summer camps, in poor neighborhoods on the outskirts of Lisbon, and in provincial theaters. It also represented Portugal in international puppetry festivals. Fonseca wrote various performance pieces for the group, some of which were also broadcast via radio on Emissora Nacional, the national broadcaster. She received a scholarship from the Calouste Gulbenkian Foundation that allowed her to visit puppet theaters in various countries.

She published numerous literary works dealing with the role of women in society, as well as novels and children's literature. She received several awards for her work from the Emissora Nacional.

== Works ==
- A mulher que amou uma sombra: novelas (1941);
- O corte sem mestre (1942);
- As três bolas de sabão (1943);
- Panguila: romance (1944);
- Lagartinha da couve (1945);
- A borboleta azul: contos em verso (1946);
- As botas saltaricas (1946);
- A menina tartaruga (1946);
- Chico Pipa (1946);
- As formigas aventureiras (1946);
- A história do gato gatão (1947);
- A chegada do Grão Turco (1947);
- O canivete afortunado (1954);
- Lagartinha da couve (1954);
- O tricot sem mestre (1957);
- Poemas da hora presente (1958);
- O malmequer das cem folhas: as aventuras de um pássaro (1958);
- Filha de branco (1960);
- O clube das três aldeias (1961);
- O relógio parado (1961);
- O grande acontecimento (1962);
- O livro da Teresinha (1962);
- Nasceu um menino na floresta (1962);
- Os companheiros do Bonifácio (1963);
- O livro do Marinho (1963);
- O menino não quer (1963);
- Os pontos dos ii: peça infantil em 1 acto (1964);
- A menina tartaruga: peça infantil em 3 actos (1966);
- O malmequer das cem flores : aventuras de um pássaro (1968);
- O livro da Mariazinha (1969);
- O livro do Adelininho (1969);
- O livro da Lili (1970);
- O livro da Néné (1970);
- A vaquinha e o sol : histórias de animais (1970);
- O livro do Jaiminho (1971);
- O realejo de lata (1971);
- Umas férias na serra da Verdelinda (1972);
- Tão-Tão aviador (1973);
- O grande acontecimento (1977);
- O livro da Stelinha (1977);
- História do teatro de Branca-Flor nos seus 20 anos de existência, 1962–1982 (1982);
- Um passeio ao jardim zoológico (1983);
- O moinho da Inácia: as aventuras de um pássaro (1987);
- Os ladrões das barbas de arame farpado: as aventuras de um pássaro (1989).
