= Stella Piteira Santos =

Portuguese communist and anti-fascist activist

- Born: 1 June 1917; Lisbon, Portugal
- Died: 22 January 2009 Aged 91; Lisbon
- Other names: Maria Stella Bicker Correia Ribeiro Piteira Santos
- Known for: Communist imprisoned by the Estado Novo regime in Portugal

Stella Piteira Santos (1917-2009) was a Portuguese communist who opposed the Estado Novo dictatorship. Arrested and tortured in Lisbon, she subsequently moved to Algeria, from where she helped broadcast programmes of Rádio Voz da Liberdade (Radio Voice of Liberty) to Portugal.

== Early life ==
Maria Stella Bicker Correia Ribeiro Piteira Santos was the daughter of Maria do Carmo Bicker from the Algarve and of a military doctor who participated in the 5 October 1910 revolution that overthrew the Portuguese monarchy. She was born on 1 June 1917, when her father was in Flanders, during Portugal's participation in World War I. Coming from a middle-class background, she initially studied at home, where one of her teachers was a young German woman. After her teacher's return to Germany, she spent three years at the German School in Lisbon in order to avoid losing her knowledge of German, and then studied at the Colégio das Doroteias in Sintra, near the Portuguese capital of Lisbon, where she received a conventional Portuguese religious education. However, she only completed her schooling after marrying Inácio Fiadeiro at the age of 17 and having two children. Fiadeiro was a communist and four years her senior.

== Opposition to the Estado Novo ==
Piteira Santos began activities in opposition to the Estado Novo dictatorship in 1934. She was an early member of the Associação Feminina Portuguesa para a Paz (Portuguese Women's Association for Peace - AFPP), with her knowledge of German proving very useful during World War II, when she assisted German Jewish refugees in Lisbon. She also joined her husband and other members of the Portuguese Communist Party (PCP) in May 1938 in organizing the escape of the communist leader Francisco Paula Oliveira, known as Pável, from the Aljube prison hospital in Lisbon, where he had been very ill. Oliveira then lived in hiding with the Fiadeiro family before making his way to Paris and eventually moving to Mexico.

Her son, António, was born in 1938 and was named after Francisco Paula Oliveira, who also went by the pseudonym of António Bugio. His godfather was the future leader of the Communist Party, Álvaro Cunhal. Around the same time, she joined the Conselho Nacional das Mulheres Portuguesas (National Council of Portuguese Women - CNMP), led by Maria Lamas. After the war, she obtained several jobs with German companies in Lisbon. Her daughter, Maria Antónia Fiadeiro, was a goddaughter of Fernando Piteira Santos, another PCP member who would become the girl's stepfather when Stella married him in 1948, following her divorce from Fiadeiro. They endured long periods of separation because Piteira Santos was always in hiding from the secret police. Originally an active Communist Party member, he was to fall out with the Party, being expelled as a "traitor" for his views on the democratization of the PCP. Inevitably, criticism also fell on his wife.

== Arrest and Exile ==
On New Year's Eve 1961 about 20 soldiers and civilians, including her husband, stormed the army barracks at Beja in an attack in support of the opposition leader Humberto Delgado, who had returned from Morocco to "seize power". Following a complex route to Beja to avoid detection, Delgado was driven part of the way by Stella. After helping her husband to escape arrest following the failure of the attack, she was, herself, arrested on 15 February 1962, and held in Caxias prison near Lisbon for almost two months. Following her release on bail, she left the country clandestinely by car, eventually arriving in Paris, to be joined two months later by her husband who had made his way to Morocco. In Paris they participated in the foundation of the Patriotic Front for National Liberation. Moving to Algiers she was the first female announcer of Rádio Voz da Liberdade, which was established in 1963 to broadcast propaganda to Portugal. Apart from an officially approved return to Portugal in 1972 to attend her father's funeral, she only returned to Portugal after the 25 April 1974 Carnation Revolution, which overthrew the Estado Novo.

Stella Piteira Santos was made a member of the Order of Liberty by the President of the Republic Jorge Sampaio. Her husband died in 1992: she died in Lisbon on 22 January 2009.
