= Maria dos Santos Machado =

Portuguese teacher, communist and anti-fascist activist

- Born: 25 February 1890; São Jorge, Azores, Portugal
- Died: 4 October 1958 (Aged 68); Lisbon
- Known for: Communist imprisoned by the Estado Novo regime in Portugal on four occasions

Maria dos Santos Machado (1890 – 1958) was a teacher and a Communist Party activist against the authoritarian Estado Novo (which governed Portugal from 1926 to 1974). She was imprisoned on four occasions between 1936 and her death in 1958.

== Early life and first arrest ==
Maria dos Santos Machado was the daughter of Bartolomeu Silveira Lucas Machado and Maria dos Santos Teixeira. She was born in Calheta, on the island of São Jorge, in the Portuguese autonomous region of Azores on 25 February 1890. She began working in the Azores as a teacher, where she sought to put innovative teaching ideas into practice. She also created a library for students that was open to the general population. Moving to the Portuguese capital of Lisbon, she worked as a primary school teacher. She also created a private school for the children of railway workers, which would be closed by the police, and founded a library in Alges near Lisbon. She was one of the founders of the Associação Feminina Portuguesa para a Paz (Portuguese Women's Association for Peace - AFPP). She joined the Portuguese Section of International Red Aid (Socorro Vermelho Internacional), established by the Communist International, and became an Esperantist, teaching Portuguese at the League of Western Esperantists. However, the use of Esperanto had been banned by the Portuguese government and Machado was arrested on 1 August 1936, being released on 12 December of the same year.

== Subsequent activities and arrests ==
In 1938 Machado went to Paris, where she served on the Portuguese Popular Front Committee, ensuring a permanent link with the anti-fascist movement operating in Portugal, corresponding with communist leaders Fernando Piteira Santos and Manuel dos Santos. She also worked with Francisco de Paula Oliveira who, after his escape from the Aljube prison in May 1938, made his way to Paris. Back in Portugal, she worked with the Portuguese Communist Party's clandestine print shop, until being arrested again on 4 November 1945 in Alvaiázere, after over four years publishing the Party's magazine, Avante!. The arrest was an accident: the police had been looking for burglars. Two others working with her were able to escape by pretending to be her aunt and mother. Machado was held in isolation at the Caxias prison near Lisbon, being released on 31 August 1947. In common with other opponents of the Estado Novo regime, Machado was forbidden to exercise her profession. She found employment as a housekeeper in a private house and embroidered rugs to survive, while continuing, clandestinely, to give free classes to workers. She was briefly detained again in December 1953. On 14 April 1954 she was arrested again, at the age of 64, soon after having broken a leg and being unable to walk, and was not released until 6 October 1956.

== Death ==
After being released for the final time she lived in a rented room. However, the police put pressure on the owner of the property, and she was evicted. Maria dos Santos Machado died on 4 October 1958 from a heart attack while walking in the Amadora district of Lisbon. In her will she left her assets to the Communist Party. Her funeral, at Lisbon's Lumiar Cemetery, was closely followed by Portugal's secret service. In her memory, the playwright, Leandro Vale, wrote a short play called "Rubina", which was the pseudonym she used.
