= Ilse Losa =

Portuguese novelist, writer of children's books, and translator

- Born: Ilse Lieblich; 20 March 1913; Melle, Germany
- Died: 6 January 2006 (aged 92); Porto
- Occupation: Artist
- Known for: Novelist, children's book writer and translator
- Notable work: O Mundo em que vivi

Ilse Losa (1913–2006) was a Portuguese writer and translator, of German-Jewish origin.

== Early life ==
Ilse Lieblich Losa was born on 20 March 1913 in the village of Buer, in Melle, in the district of Osnabrück in Germany. She was the daughter of Artur Lieblich and Hedwig Hirsch Lieblich, both German Jews. She was initially raised and educated by her paternal grandparents. After rejoining her parents and her two younger brothers, Ernest and Fritz, she attended the Osnabrück and Hildesheim high schools and, later, the Hanover Business Institute. After the premature death of her father, victim of cancer, in the late 1920s, the family began to suffer severe financial difficulties. To help out, she went to England in 1930 for a year, where she worked as an au pair. There, she had her first contacts with children's schools and children's problems, which would influence her later writing career.

== Departure from Germany ==
On her return to Germany, she found her family to be increasingly the target of anti-Semitic attacks. Threatened by the Gestapo with being sent to a concentration camp, following hours of interrogation, she made the decision with her mother to leave Germany, arriving by boat in Portugal in 1934, and settling in the city of Porto, where her brother Fritz was already living. In 1935, having acquired Portuguese nationality, she married the architect Arménio Taveira Losa. That same year, she became a member of the Associação Feminina Portuguesa para a Paz, (Portuguese Women's Peace Association - AFPP), an apolitical and non-religious association of anti-fascist and anti-war women. Her mother died in 1936.

== Writing career ==
Losa's first daughter, Alexandra, was born in 1938, and the second, Margarida, in 1943. In 1949, she published her first book, O Mundo em que vivi (The world I lived in), which told of her childhood, adolescence and youth, until the time she left Germany. The Holocaust features strongly in this work, as it does in several of her novels. She was the only writer in Portugal to really address the Holocaust. Cavaco argues that the author's works on this subject can be read as a trilogy, in which this historical event is represented. In this sense, Losa's novels explore before, during and after the Holocaust, examining different actors who were involved in the event, such as the victims, the perpetrators, the bystanders and the resisters.

Although Losa mainly worked on children's literature, she also published in several German and Portuguese newspapers and magazines, such as Jornal de Notícias, Comércio do Porto, Diário de Notícias, Público and Neue Deutsche Literatur. She also collaborated in the translation of Portuguese works published in Germany and translated from German to Portuguese authors such as Bertolt Brecht, Erich Kästner, Max Frisch and Anna Seghers, as well as The Diary of Anne Frank.

Ilse Losa died on 6 January 2006, in Porto.

== Awards and honours ==
- Losa was twice awarded the Gulbenkian Grand Prize for Literature for Children and Youth, in 1981, for the book Na Quinta das Cerejeiras (At the cherry farm), and in 1983 for her children's books as a whole.
- In 1998, Losa received the Grand Prize from the Portuguese Writers Association for her collection of articles called À Flor do Tempo.
- On 9 June 1995, Losa was appointed as a Commander of the Order of Prince Henry (Portuguese: Ordem do Infante Dom Henrique), a senior Portuguese award.
- A Portuguese postage stamp was issued in her honour in 2013.

== Publications ==
Ilse Losa's main publications are as follows:

=== Novels ===
- O Mundo em Que Vivi (1949)
- Histórias Quase Esquecidas (1950)
- Grades Brancas (1951), poems and prose
- Rio Sem Ponte (1952)
- Aqui Havia Uma Casa (1955)
- Retta ou o Ciúme da Morte (1958)
- Sob Céus Estranhos (1962)
- Encontros no Outono (1965)
- O Barco Afundado (1979)
- Caminhos Sem Destino (1991)

=== Children’s literature ===
- Faísca Conta a Sua História (1949)
- A Flor Azul e outras Histórias (1955)
- Um Fidalgo de Pernas Curtas (1958)
- Um Artista Chamado Duque (1965)
- A Adivinha (1967)
- O Quadro Roubado (1976)
- Beatriz e o Plátano (1977)
- João e Guida (1977)
- O Príncipe Nabo (1978)
- O Mosquito e o Sr. Pechincha (1979)
- A Minha Melhor História (1979)
- Bonifácio (1980)
- A Estranha História duma Tília (1981)
- Na Quinta das Cerejeiras (1981)
- O Expositor (1982)
- Viagem com Wish (1983)
- Estas Searas (1984)
- Ana-Ana ou Uma Coisa Nunca Vista (1987)
- O Senhor Leopardo (1987)
- Ora ouve... Histórias Antiquíssimas (1987)
- A Visita do Padrinho (1989)
- O rei Rique e Outras Histórias (1989)
- Silka (1991)

=== Collections of articles ===
- Ida e Volta à Procura de Babbitt (1958)
- À Flor do Tempo (1997)
