= Irene Lisboa =

Portuguese novelist, short story writer, poet, essayist (1892 - 1958)

- Born: Irene do Céu Vieira Lisboa; 25 December 1892; Quinta da Murzinheira, Portugal
- Died: November 25, 1958 (aged 65); Lisbon, Portugal
- Other names: Manuel Soares, João Falcó
- Occupation: writer
- Awards: Commander of the Order of Liberty

Irene do Céu Vieira Lisboa (25 December 1892 – 25 November 1958) was a Portuguese novelist, short story writer, poet, essayist and educational writer. Especially for her fictional work, she has achieved a special place in modern Portuguese literature.

== Biography ==
Irene Lisboa was born in Quinta da Murzinheira in the municipality of Arruda dos Vinhos, Portugal. She came from very wealthy background and grew up at the family estate where she was born. She attended the Escola Normal Primeira de Lisboa, and graduated high school from the convent boarding school of Convento do Sacramento. After schooling in Lisbon, she studied pedagogy in Belgium, France and Switzerland. In Geneva, Switzerland, she studied at the educational institute where her lecturers included the well-known educator Édouard Claparède.

She then worked as a teacher and a school inspector before becoming an official of the Instituto para a Alta Cultura (Institute of High Culture).

Lisboa used several pen names: Manuel Soares for her educational works and João Falcó for her early literary works and much of her poetry as women writers were not generally accepted at the time. However, although the fact that a male pseudonym appears on some of her work, the tone of the work reveals that the narrator is a woman, something that is "never disguised or expressly omitted."

From 1926 to 1958, in addition to several academic works on pedagogy, she published poems, short stories, novels, books for children, and literary essays. She also contributed to a number of Portuguese periodicals. Her literature was well received in both Portugal and Brazil. The poet and literary critic Jorge de Sena considered she was one of the "greatest Portuguese writers on account of the incomparable originality of her style and personality".

This led her to adopt pseudonyms to write her opinions, namely João Falco, Manuel Soares and Maria Moira.

She died in Lisbon on November 25, 1958, one month shy of her 66th birthday. The writer's remains were, on January 13, 2013, transferred from Ajuda cemetery in Lisbon to Arruda dos Vinhos cemetery.

== Death and legacy ==
On November 25, 1958, exactly one month before her 66th birthday, she died in Lisbon.

In 1989, she was made a Commander of the Order of Liberty. A bust is dedicated to her in her hometown. A street is dedicated to her, Rua Irene Lisboa, in Lisbon near the Alverca Air Base.

== Selected works ==
- 1943: Apontamentos, writings resembling a diary
- 1940: Começa uma vida, autobiographical story
- 1942: Esta cidade!, reportage
- 1958: Título qualquer serve reportage
- 1965: Solidão, writings resembling a diary

=== Texts ===
- 1942: A psychologica do desenho infantil, educational work.
- 1944: Educaçao, educational work.
