= Elina Guimarães =

Portuguese feminist and writer (1904–1991)

- Born: Elina Júlia Chaves Pereira Guimarães; 8 August 1904; Lisbon, Portugal
- Died: 26 June 1991 (aged 86); Lisbon
- Occupation: Writer
- Known for: Leading feminist and campaigner for improved education for girls
- Notable work: Coisas de Mulheres; Mulheres Portuguesas: Ontem e Hoje

Elina Guimarães (1904–1991) was a writer and feminist leader in Portugal during the middle of the 20th century.

== Early life ==
Elina Júlia Chaves Pereira Guimarães was born on 8 August 1904 in Lisbon, the only daughter of Alice Pereira Guimarães and Vitorino Máximo de Carvalho Guimarães. Her father was in the Portuguese Army and also held important political positions during the First Portuguese Republic, including, briefly in 1925, the equivalent to prime minister. She thus grew up in an environment dominated by politics and from an early age she became interested in political action, especially in women's rights. After studying at home, like most of the girls of the upper bourgeoisie, and then at secondary schools, she enrolled at the Faculty of Law of the University of Lisbon, graduating in 1926. She never practiced law, although she did work at a children’s court. However, her knowledge of women's rights from the legal point of view was essential for her role of informing many women about their rights.

== Writing and activism ==
In 1925, still a university student, she joined the feminist movement, publishing in the journal Vida Académica a challenge to derogatory comments in relation to working women made in O Terceiro Sexo (The third sex) by Júlio Dantas, in which he said that women who studied or worked stopped being women and became the third sex. As a result of her article, she was invited by Adelaide Cabete to join the Conselho Nacional das Mulheres Portuguesas (CNMP - National Council of Portuguese Women). In 1927 she became the secretary general of the CNMP. In 1928 she was elected vice-president of the board of the CNMP and began to be very active in arguing for the right of women to participate in politics and for female suffrage. Her articles, with a feminist and legal theme, frequently appeared in the press, arguing for co-education, women’s political rights and women's access to professional careers. She was editor of the CNMP’s bulletin, Alma feminina, in 1929 and 1930, was responsible for the "Feminist Page" in the magazine Portugal Feminino, and wrote for multiple newspapers and periodicals, including Diário de Notícias, O Primeiro de Janeiro, and the legal journal Gazeta da Ordem dos Advogados (now Gazeta Jurídica).

In 1928 she married Adelino da Palma Carlos, a lawyer and professor of law who would head the first government after the Carnation Revolution on 25 April 1974 saw the overthrow of the right-wing, authoritarian Estado Novo government. The couple had two children. In 1931 she was among the intellectuals and activists who protested to the Minister of Public Education against the suppression of coeducation in primary education. She also argued that all girls should receive the same understanding of Science, Geography and History as was taught to boys. In 1945 she joined the Movement of Democratic Unity (Portuguese: Movimento de Unidade Democrática or MUD), a quasi-legal platform of organizations that opposed the Estado Novo. In 1946 she was elected vice-president of the general assembly of the CNMP, when Maria Lamas was president, occupying the position in 1947, the year in which the authorities of the Estado Novo regime ordered its closure. She was a prominent member of several international organizations, including the International Council of Women and the International Alliance for Women's Suffrage.

Exactly two years after the Carnation Revolution of 25 April 1974 Portugal’s new Political Constitution came into force. It established equality between the sexes at all levels, including in the family. Her articles published in the daily press between 1970 and 1975 were collected in the book Coisas de Mulheres (Women’s matters). In 1979, the Commission on the Status of Women published a booklet entitled Portuguese Women Past and Present (Mulheres Portuguesas: Ontem e Hoje), written by Guimarães. In 1987, it was published in English. In this booklet, she discusses the very brief history of feminism in Portugal. Denouncing the sexual inequalities in the country at the time, she noted later that, "Personally, I found it humiliating that long years of study were necessary for women to have the rights of men who could only read and write".

Elina Guimarães died on 26 June 1991, in Lisbon. On 26 April 1985, she had been made an Officer of the Order of Liberty (Portuguese: Ordem da Liberdade), a Portuguese civil order given for services to the cause of democracy and freedom. The Order was created in 1976, after the Carnation Revolution. Elina Guimarães was one of seven women that President Ramalho Eanes personally chose to decorate, “for her example and activity in the areas of her intervention to highlight the action of women in Portuguese society”. A fund created in her name, administered by the General Council of the Portuguese Bar Association, has since 2016 awarded the Elina Guimarães prize annually to the person or organization that has made the greatest contribution to women's rights and the defence of gender equality.

== Publications ==
The list of newspaper and journal articles and other publications by Elina Guimarães, available on the web site of the library of the Portuguese Bar Association, amounts to around 400 items. Her more important books are listed below:

- Dos Crimes Culposos (1930)
- O Poder Maternal (1933)
- La Condition de la Femme au Portugal (1938)
- A Condição Jurídica da Mulher no Direito de Família perante as Nações Unidas (1962)
- Coisas de Mulheres (collection, 1975)
- Mulheres Portuguesas: Ontem e Hoje (1978)
- Portuguese Women: Past and present (1987)
- Sete Décadas de Feminismo (1991)
