= Maria Lamas =

Portuguese writer and feminist (1893–1983)

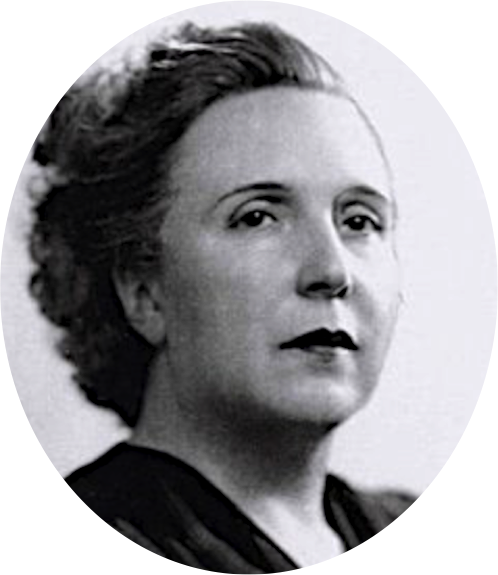
- Lamas in 1939
- Born: Maria da Conceição Vassalo e Silva; 6 October 1893; Torres Novas, Kingdom of Portugal
- Died: 6 December 1983 (aged 90); Lisbon, Portugal
- Occupation: Author
- Known for: Writer; Feminist; Opponent of authoritarian Estado Novo government; Political prisoner
- Notable work: As Mulheres do Meu País; A Mulher no Mundo
- Spouse: Teófilo José Pignolet Ribeiro da Fonseca (m. 1911; div. 1920) Alfredo da Cunha Lamas (m. 1921; div. 1936)
- Children: 3
- Relatives: Manuel António Vassalo e Silva (brother); Maria Lúcia Vassalo Namorado (cousin); Alice Vieira (cousin)

Maria Lamas (born Maria da Conceição Vassalo e Silva; 6 October 1893 – 6 December 1983) was a Portuguese writer, translator, journalist, and feminist political activist.

== Early life ==
Maria da Conceição Vassalo e Silva da Cunha Lamas was born on 6 October 1893 in Torres Novas in the Santarém District of Portugal. Her parents both came from well-off families. Her father was a Freemason while her mother was a pious Catholic. She had two younger sisters and was the older sister of Manuel António Vassalo e Silva, who would become the last Governor-General of Portuguese India, and cousin of the children’s book writers Alice Vieira and of the writer and publisher Maria Lúcia Vassalo Namorado. She attended primary and secondary school in Torres Novas, completing her secondary education at a boarding school run by Spanish nuns, from which her father removed her, concerned that she was developing a religious vocation. The nuns may not have been too disappointed: one was quoted as saying “a demon left here”. At the age of 17, in 1911, she married Teófilo José Pignolet Ribeiro da Fonseca, an officer at the local Cavalry School. In the same year, and already pregnant, she accompanied her husband who was assigned to work at a military prison in Capelongo in what was then Portuguese Angola. Her first daughter was born there.

In 1913 Maria Lamas returned to Portugal, again pregnant. With the First World War beginning, the marriage breaking down, and her husband being transferred to the front in Flanders and France, she was forced to look for a way of supporting herself and her daughters. She moved to Lisbon and started working at the American News Agency with the help of Virgínia Quaresma, Portugal’s first female professional journalist. She also wrote for Portuguese newspapers such as Correio da Manhã. In 1920 she was granted a divorce and in 1921 she married the journalist Alfredo da Cunha Lamas. The couple had a daughter but separated soon after her birth and were formally divorced in 1936. But she always kept the surname of her second husband.

== Career ==
After her second marriage Lamas started to write for other newspapers, such as O Século, and A Capital, as well as publishing poems (Os Humildes, 1923), serials, novels (Caminho Luminoso, Para Além do Amor, Ilha Verde), and stories for children. Her works for women were more political and focused on improvements to women's rights. In 1928, she was invited to direct the supplement, Modas & Bordados of O Século, at the invitation of the writer José Maria Ferreira de Castro. Her work on this magazine, which lasted almost two decades, quickly led to the supplement's losses being reversed, as a result of her approach of writing "woman to woman" and questioning the traditional and conservative standards of women in Portuguese society. In 1936, she also created a supplement, Joaninha, for girls. She became friends with other female authors in Portugal, such as Branca de Gonta Colaço. In 1936 she joined the National Council of Portuguese Women (CNMP), chaired at that time by feminist activist Adelaide Cabete.

She began a relationship with Ferreira de Castro, often referred to by historians as being an "amitié amoureuse". They exchanged numerous letters, postcards and telegrams reporting on daily life, travel, thoughts, sadness, dreams and compliments about each other's literary work, ending only in 1973, the year before his death. Apparently, they planned for these to be published after their deaths. In 1930, she created, together with the CNMP and O Século, an "Exhibition of Female Work, ancient and modern of a literary, artistic and scientific character", which intended to give visibility to women's work from all of Portugal. It generated much media attention and also raised her visibility with the CNMP, which elected her President for Education in 1937 and Literature in 1939. She was made an Officer of the Order of Santiago (Portuguese: Ordem Militar de Sant'Iago da Espada) on 7 February 1934, for her work on behalf of women. A year later, she joined the Associação Feminina Portuguesa para a Paz (Portuguese Women's Peace Association - AFPP), where she got to know a fellow feminist and anti-government activist, Virgínia Moura. From this time, she started to sign her work as Maria Lamas, having previously used pseudonyms such as "Serrana d'Ayre", "Rosa Silvestre", "Vagna Ina" and "Armia", the last mainly being used in the magazine Alma feminina, the official means of communication of the CNMP.

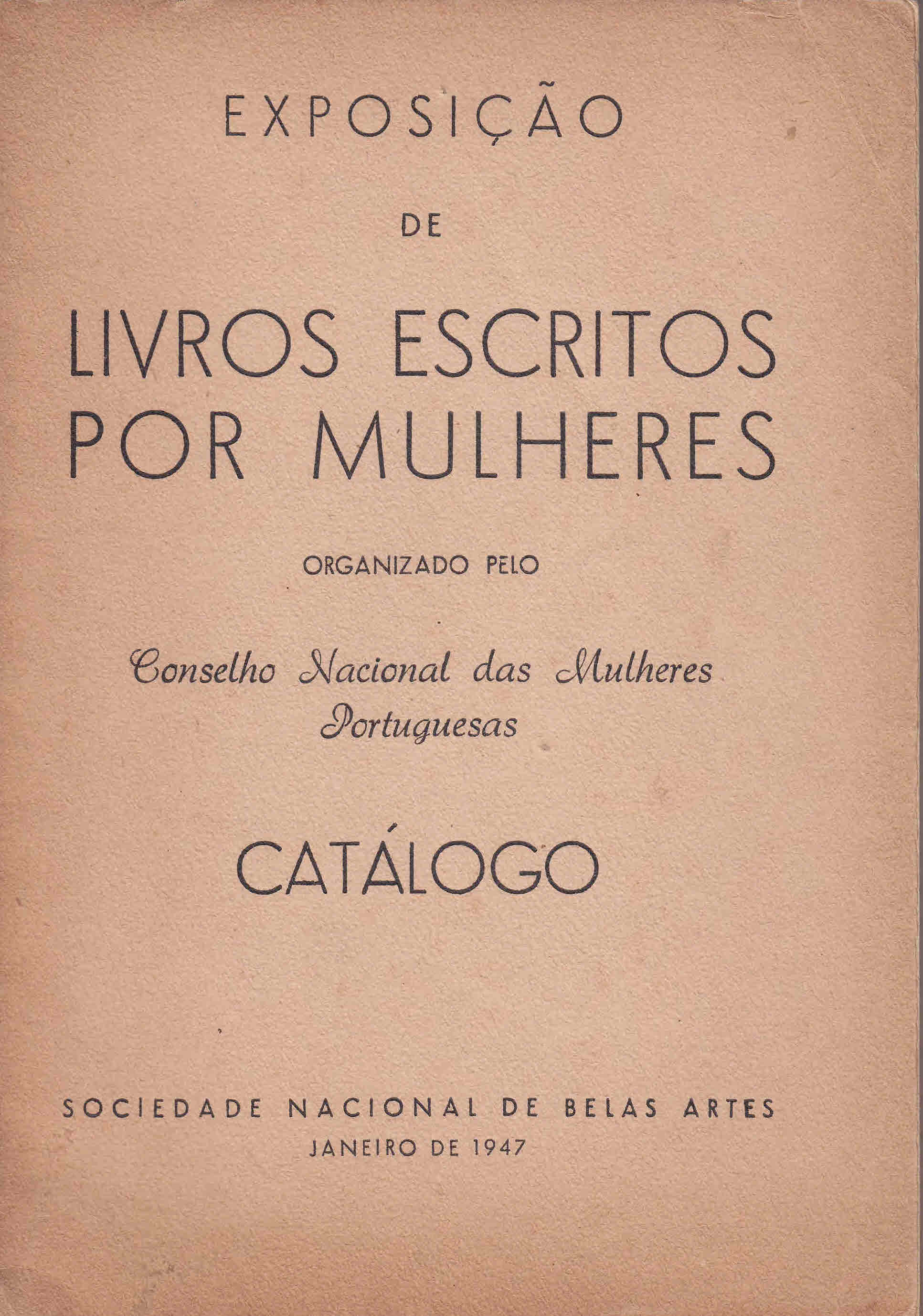
Cover of the catalogue of the Exhibition of Books Written by Women, organized by Lamas

In July 1945, she became president of the Board of the CNMP, with the promise of promoting literacy campaigns throughout the country. She resigned from her position at O Século and began one of her most important literary works The Women of my Country (As Mulheres do Meu País), the first ever report on the living conditions of Portuguese women. In 1947 she also organised an exhibition of books written by women. This brought together three thousand books by 1400 women authors from thirty countries, which filled the Great Hall of Fine Arts at the University of Lisbon. Soon after, however, the CNMP was declared a forbidden organization by the authoritarian Estado Novo government. In 1952, she published a two-volume work on The Woman in the World (A Mulher no Mundo), which offered a comparative history of the state of feminism around the world, the result of exhaustive research. Both The Women of my Country and The Woman in the World were subject to censorship, a fact that she found extremely frustrating. After the Carnation Revolution in 1974, which overthrew the Estado Novo, she announced that she was going to write a book saying all the things that she had been unable to say before, although no manuscript has been found.

She also continued to develop propaganda against the Estado Novo and supported the aborted Presidential candidacy of José Norton de Matos in 1949. She was active in the Movement of Democratic Unity (MUD), which provided a platform for groups opposed to the Estado Novo. Her activities led to her being imprisoned several times in the Caxias prison near Lisbon (1949, 1953 and 1962). In 1949 she was kept in isolation for several months and fell very sick. In 1962, tired of living under the threat of arrest, she travelled to Paris. There, she met the writer Marguerite Yourcenar and translated one of her works. She began to develop activities to support Portuguese refugees who opposed the regime, such as Helena Pato and Stella Piteira Santos, only returning to Portugal at the end of 1969, with a guarantee that there were no arrest warrants against her. Throughout her time in Paris she lived in a small hotel in the Latin Quarter. For a time she was also exiled on the Portuguese island of Madeira.

== After the Carnation Revolution ==
Following the overthrow of the Estado Novo as a result of the Carnation Revolution, on 25 April 1974, Lamas officially joined the Portuguese Communist Party. She also received several honours, becoming director of the Portuguese Committee for Peace and Cooperation; honorary president of the Democratic Women's Movement in 1975; and director of the publication Mulheres in 1978. She received the Order of Liberty (Portuguese: Ordem da Liberdade) in 1980; was honoured by the Assembleia da República in 1982; and also received the Eugénie Cotton medal from the Women's International Democratic Federation (FDIM) in 1983. Lamas had participated in the congress that set up the Federation, in 1946.

Lamas died in Lisbon on 6 December 1983, at the age of 90, of cardiac arrest. In her home town of Torres Novas, in 1989, her name was given to the town’s industrial school, in celebration of its 50th anniversary. A small square had been named after her in October 1987. These changes were locally controversial, not so much because of her politics but because she was known for having a short temper, having had several fights with neighbours. Her name has also been given to several other roads and squares in other parts of Portugal.

== Published works ==
- Humildes (poetry) (1923).
- Diferença de Raças (novel) (1924).
- O Caminho Luminoso (novel) (1928).
- Maria Cotovia (children's book) (1929).
- As Aventuras de Cinco Irmãozinhos (children's book) (1931).
- A Montanha Maravilhosa (children's book) (1933).
- A Estrela do Norte (children's book) (1934).
- Brincos de Cereja (children's book) (1935).
- Para Além do Amor (novel) (1935).
- A Ilha Verde (children's book) (1938).
- O Vale dos Encantos (children's book) (1942).
- O Caminho Luminoso (1942).
- As Mulheres do Meu País (1948).
- A Mulher no Mundo (1952).
- O Mundo dos Deuses e dos Heróis, Mitologia Geral (1961).
- Arquipélago da Madeira (1956).
