= Movement of National Antifascist Unity =

The Movement of National Antifascist Unity (Portuguese: Movimento de Unidade Nacional Antifascista or MUNAF) was a political platform of democratic organizations which fought against the Portuguese authoritarian regime (led by António de Oliveira Salazar). The Movement of National Antifascist Unity was founded in December 1943, shortly after the 3rd Congress of the Portuguese Communist Party, that strongly influenced its creation.

Inside the MUNAF, several tendencies of the democratic resistance were joined together, along with the communists, it also congregated socialists, republicans, Catholics, liberals and monarchists. Several prominent figures of the resistance made part of its leadership, such as Bento de Jesus Caraça, Mário Soares and Norton de Matos.

The MUNAF ended when, in 1945, with a whole new international panorama created by the defeat of the major fascist regimes in World War II, Salazar was forced to fake some democratic changes in order to keep its image at the eyes of the western allies. Thus, in October 1945, the democratic resistance was legally authorized to form a platform. That platform, originated in the MUNAF, was named Movement of Democratic Unity (Portuguese: Movimento de Unidade Democrática, or MUD) and replaced the MUNAF as the major platform of democratic organizations.
