= Fernando Lopes-Graça =

Portuguese composer, conductor and musicologist (1906 - 1994)

Fernando Lopes-Graça GOSE GCIH
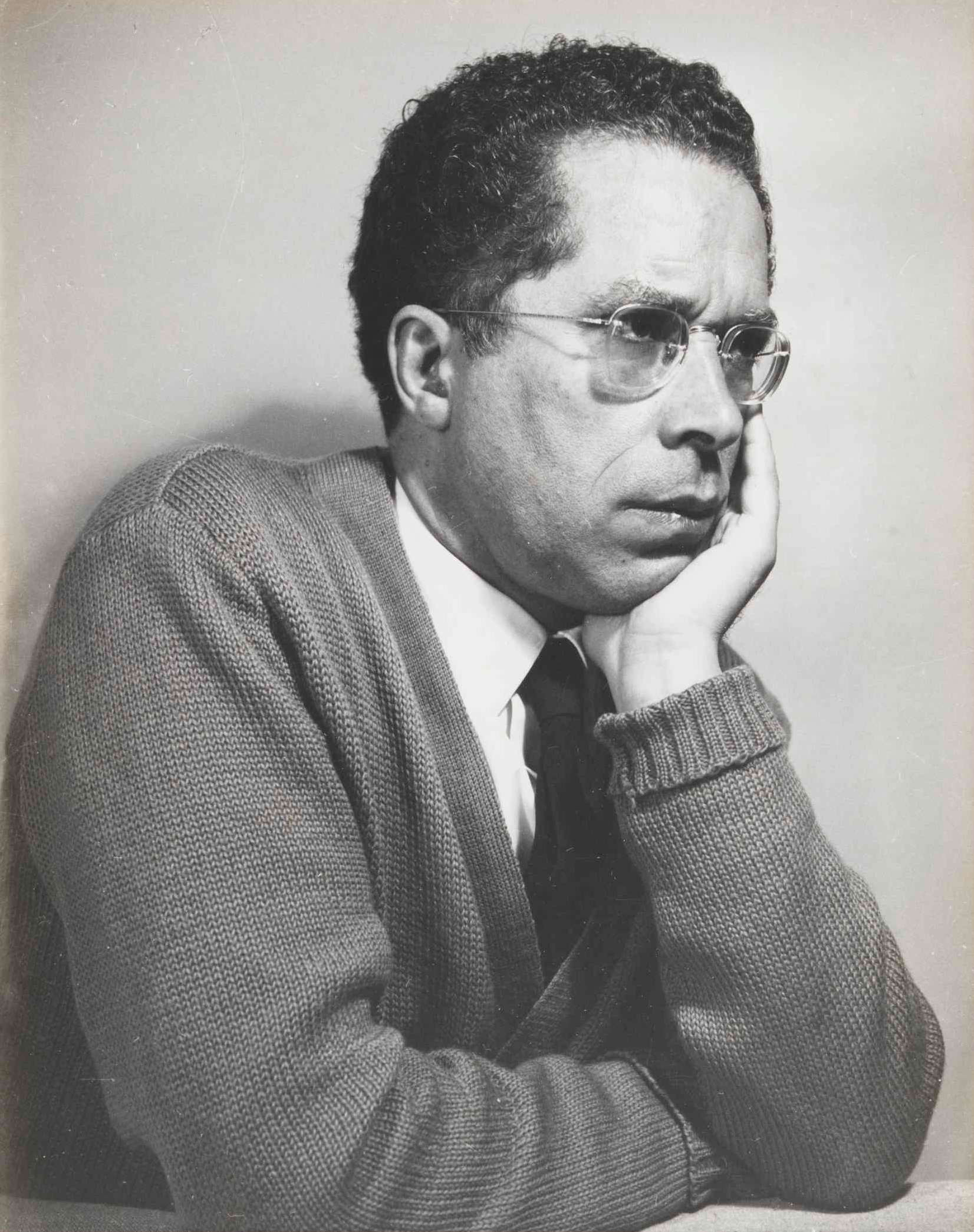
- Born: 17 December 1906; Tomar, Kingdom of Portugal
- Died: 27 November 1994 (aged 87); Parede, Portugal
- Political party: PCP

Fernando Lopes-Graça GOSE GCIH (17 December 1906 – 27 November 1994) was a Portuguese composer, conductor and musicologist. Lopes-Graça was born in Tomar, and was influenced by Portuguese popular music, which he also studied, continuing the work of the composer and musicologist Francisco de Lacerda. He was a member of the Portuguese Communist Party and strenuously opposed the Estado Novo and its leader António de Oliveira Salazar. He completed the Dicionário de Música (Dictionary of Music), started by his teacher, Tomás Borba, himself a composer. He died in Parede, near Cascais.

== Chronology ==
- 1906: 17 December: birth in Tomar (where he would start his piano studies).
- 1924: becomes a student at the Conservatório Nacional de Lisboa.
- 1927: becomes a student of Vianna da Motta's Classe de Virtuosidade.
- 1931: obtains the Composition Degree. In the same year he is arrested and expelled to Alpiarça.
- 1934: wins a scholarship to study in France, which he is later denied for political reasons.
- 1937: goes to Paris, where he studies with composition and orchestration with Charles Koechlin.
- 1938: The "Maison de la Culture de Paris" commissions «La fiévre du temps» (ballet-revue). Harmonisation of traditional Portuguese songs.
- 1940: Wins the composition prize from Círculo de Cultura Musical with his 1st Concert for Piano and Orchestra.
- 1942: wins a prize from Círculo de Cultura Musical for «História Trágico-Marítima» (Miguel Torga poem).
- 1944: wins, for the 3rd time, the Composition Prize from Círculo de Cultura Musical for «Sinfonia».
- 1945: integrates the Movement of Democratic Unity's District Commission.
- 1949: integrates the jury of the International Béla Bartók Festival in Budapest.
- 1952: wins another composition prize from Círculo de Cultura Musical for his 3rd Piano Sonata, dedicated to the Franco-Swiss pianist Hélène Boschi, who premieres the sonata in Paris in 1954.
- 1961: publishes, with Michel Giacometti, the 1st volume of the Antologia de Música Regional Portuguesa. Starts work on «In Memoriam Béla Bartók» (8 progressive suites for piano), which he will complete in 1975.
- 1969: Mstislav Rostropovich performs his Concerto da Camera (cello).
- 1973: Editora Cosmos starts the publication of «Obras Literárias» (18 volumes).
- 1974: becomes president of the Comissão para a Reforma do Ensino Musical, created by the Provisional Government of the April Revolution.
- 1979: composes the «Requiem pelas vítimas do fascismo em Portugal» (Requiem for the Victims of Fascism in Portugal) for large orchestra, soloists, and choir.
- 1981: receives invitation from the Hungarian government for the celebrations of the 100th anniversary of Béla Bartók's birth.
- 1993: publication of his complete piano sonatas and sonatinas (Matosinhos). Tribute for his 87th birthday.
- 1994: dies, at home, in the evening of 27 November.

== Distinctions ==
=== National orders ===
- Grand Officer of the Order of Saint James of the Sword (9 April 1981)
- Grand Cross of the Order of Prince Henry the Navigator (2 February 1987)

== Sources and links ==
- Bio, Catalogue & Audio Samples
- Brief biography and record reviews at musicweb-international.com
- Mário Vieira de Carvalho (2012), « Politics of Identity and Counter-Hegemony: Lopes-Graça and the Concept of 'National Music'», in: Music and Politics
- Mário Vieira de Carvalho (2011), «Between Political Engagement and Aesthetic Autonomy: Fernando Lopes-Graça's Dialectical Approach to Music and Politics», in: Twentieth-Century Music
