= Movement of Democratic Unity =

The Movement of Democratic Unity (Portuguese: Movimento de Unidade Democrática or MUD) was a quasi-legal platform of Portuguese democratic organizations that opposed the authoritarian dictatorial regime of António de Oliveira Salazar and was founded in October 1945.

The defeat of the Fascist regimes in World War II put the clerico-fascist Estado Novo regime in a troublesome position. In hopes of improving the image of the regime in Western circles, the government authorized some limited democratic openings, such as the creation of the MUD, in October 1945. The opposition groups were already organized in the Movement of National Antifascist Unity (MUNAF), which was quickly replaced by the MUD.

The MUD quickly developed a strong structure, based on local committees at district, parish and neighborhood level. Initially, MUD was dominated by the moderate elements of the opposition, but soon the Portuguese Communist Party became the main force inside the Movement. The growing influence of the MUD in the Portuguese society, combined with the strong anti-communist action of the government, led to the banning of MUD in January 1948.

In 1946, the MUD created a youth wing, the Juvenile MUD (Portuguese: MUD Juvenil or MUDJ). This wing was the most influenced by the Communist Party.
