= Ivone Dias Lourenço =

Portuguese communist opponent of the Estado Novo dictatorship and political prisoner

- Born: Ivone Conceição Dias Lourenço; 3 April 1937; Vila Franca de Xira, Portugal
- Died: 24 January 2008 (Aged 70)
- Occupation: Journalist
- Known for: Opponent of authoritarian Estado Novo Government; Political prisoner

Ivone Dias Lourenço was a Portuguese communist and an opponent of the Estado Novo regime in Portugal. She spent almost seven years as a political prisoner. A report of her imprisonment in a British newspaper led to her being indirectly connected with the foundation of the human rights organization Amnesty International.

== Early life ==
Ivone Conceição Dias Lourenço was born on 3 April 1937 in Vila Franca de Xira, just to the north of the Portuguese capital of Lisbon. She was the daughter of two clandestine members of the Portuguese Communist Party (PCP), António Dias Lourenço da Silva and Casimira da Conceição Silva, which meant changing homes often and sometimes being left with family friends so that she could go to school. At the age of seven she went to live with the publisher, Francisco Lyon de Castro, and from that time she no longer lived with her parents, although she maintained sporadic contact. In 1946, during the 4th illegal Congress of the PCP, at the age of nine, she was explained away as the "daughter" of the "maid" during the meeting, with instructions to stay in the garden of the building where it was being held and warn the participants of anything unusual. Her parents were both arrested in December 1949. In 1954 her father was the first communist to escape from Peniche Fortress, which was being used by the Estado Novo as a political prison.

== Activism ==
At the age of 15, with the encouragement of the PCP activist, Domingos Abrantes, Lourenço joined the youth wing of the Movement of Democratic Unity (Movimento de Unidade Democrática- MUD), which was a quasi-legal platform of Portuguese democratic organizations that opposed the Estado Novo regime led by António de Oliveira Salazar. She became a Communist Party militant in 1953 and in 1955 also went underground, working to support other Party members, usually men. She worked at a house in Lisbon before transferring to one in Pinhal Novo in the Setúbal district, working with Rolando Verdial. On 23 November 1957 she and Verdial were arrested: she was later sentenced to two years in prison but served much longer as the trial only took place three years after she was arrested. She was held in Caxias prison, near Lisbon. Verdial was sentenced to six years in prison and was held in Peniche Fortress. He was one of the ten who escaped on 3 January 1960, to the embarrassment of the regime.

Lourenço was initially held in solitary confinement for six months, eventually being moved to a collective dormitory where she lived with Aida Magro, Aida Paula, Alda Nogueira, Cândida Ventura, Fernanda de Paiva Tomás, Julieta Gandra, Maria Ângela Vidal e Campos, Maria da Piedade Gomes dos Santos, Maria Eugénia Varela Gomes, Maria Luísa Costa Dias and the sisters Georgette Ferreira and Sofia Ferreira. She was the author of one of 13 letters sent secretly from Caxias Prison in May 1961, intended to be read at a meeting in Paris and addressed to "organizations and democratic women from all over the world". These letters denounced the conditions in which the women were held and the torture they faced.

Lourenço was eventually released on 8 June 1964 having spent six years and nine months in confinement. She told the Público newspaper in 2004: "It was a very important period that I was in prison. For example, when I left in 1964, I had never heard The Beatles." On her release, she was subject to tight surveillance by the PIDE, Portugal's secret police. Following her illegal trip to Kiev in Ukraine to take part in the PCP's 6th Congress, her conditional release from prison was revoked. She went underground again to escape arrest. After the Carnation Revolution on 25 April 1974, which overthrew the Estado Novo, she returned to living a legal life, reuniting with her father, who she had not seen since his arrest. She then worked with the official PCP newspaper, Avante!, until retiring in 2003. Lourenço died on 24 January 2008.

== Amnesty International connection ==
On 19 December 1960, Amnesty International founder Peter Benenson was reading a copy of The Times of London on his way to work, when he saw an article reporting on the sentencing of Lourenço and Verdial. This inspired him to write and get published an opinion piece in The Observer, known as the "forgotten prisoners", on 28 May 1961, the date Amnesty International celebrates as its founding date. Benenson went on to launch the Appeal for Amnesty 1961, which lead to the creation of Amnesty International in September 1962.
