= Luísa Basto =

Portuguese singer and communist opponent of the Estado Novo regime

- Born: Úrsula Lobato; 1947 (age 78–79)
- Origin: Serpa, Portugal
- Genres: Revolutionary
- Instrument: Vocals
- Years active: 1967 – present

Luísa Basto (born 1947) is a Portuguese singer, best known for her recordings of the anthem of the Portuguese Communist Party (PCP), Avante Camarada (Forward comrade), and of É Para Ti Mulher Esta Canção (This song is for you, woman), anthem of the Portuguese Movimento Democrático de Mulheres (Women's Democratic Movement - MDM)

== Early life ==
Luísa Basto was born as Úrsula Lobato in Serpa, Portugal in 1947. Her parents, who both liked to sing, were militant supporters of the PCP and its opposition to Portugal's authoritarian Estado Novo regime. They adopted a clandestine existence when their daughter was only 12 years old and she lived with them in clandestine houses in Lisbon and Sintra for over a year, printing communist publications, until they were arrested by the secret police. She was then helped to travel to the Soviet Union.

== Moscow ==
She was looked after on her arrival by the communist leader Álvaro Cunhal and says that it was he who gave her the alias of Luísa Basto. In Moscow, she attended a school for foreigners. In 1967 she recorded her first album entitled Canções Portuguesas (Portuguese songs), which included the first version of the song Avante Camarada, which she recorded with the Soviet Radio and Television Orchestra. The song, written by Luís Cília, was composed at the request of Carlos Antunes, then representative of the PCP in Paris. The idea was that this should be broadcast through the clandestine Rádio Portugal Livre, which operated from Bucharest, Romania and by Rádio Voz da Liberdade, an anti-fascist station broadcasting from Algiers. Basto also recorded an EP that was distributed clandestinely in Portugal, called Canções Revolucionárias Portuguesas (Revolutionary Portuguese Songs), with music by Fernando Lopes-Graça and lyrics by Manuel Alegre. She then studied singing at Moscow State Higher Musical Institute, graduating at the end of 1973.

== Return to Portugal ==
After graduating, Basto moved to Paris. Following the 25 April 1974 Carnation Revolution, which overthrew the Estado Novo, she returned to Portugal, where she recorded a new version of Avante Camarada, with arrangements and direction by Pedro Osório. She then performed throughout the country and also went overseas to sing for Portuguese émigrés. In 1977 she was part of the group, Os Amigos, that won that year's RTP Song Festival with the song Portugal no coração (Portugal in my heart) and then represented Portugal in the Eurovision Song Contest, finishing 10th. The song was a celebration of the end of the Estado Novo and the end of Portugal's colonial wars. Issued as a single, it included on the B-side a song entitled Message to Angela Davis in homage to the American political activist. She also recorded several solo records.

== To the present ==
In 1980 Basto recorded the album Caminho e Canto. In 1981 she recorded a third version of Avante Camarada with an orchestra and the voices of Carlos Alberto Moniz, Carlos Mendes, Fernando Tordo, and others. She then recorded É Para Ti Mulher Esta Canção, which became the anthem of the Movimento Democrático de Mulheres. In 1982, Basto released the double album 25 Canções. The live album, Recital - Luísa Basto ao vivo was recorded in January 1984 with the orchestra of Shegundo Galarza. Further albums included Silêncio Vigiado, Fado, and Marcha Municipal. This included songs used by the Unitary Democratic Coalition (CDU), an alliance of the PCP and Portugal's Ecologist Party "The Greens" in the 1997 general election. Basto played the part of the fado singer Amália Rodrigues in the musical, Amália. In 2006, her home town of Serpa published an album of her songs, called Alentejo, named after the Portuguese region in which Serpa is situated. In 2010 she presented a show celebrating her 40 years as a performer. In December 2010, a DVD celebrating her career was issued with the PCP magazine Avante!. In 2012, she issued an album Minha Vida Meu Amor (My life, my love). She gave a public performance in 2017, which in a 2021 interview, she indicated would probably be her last.
