= Helena Pato =

Portuguese communist and political prisoner

- Born: April 19, 1939; Oliveira do Bairro, Portugal
- Other name: Maria Helena Martins dos Santos Pato Noales Rodrigues
- Occupation: Mathematics teacher
- Known for: Writer; Opponent of authoritarian Estado Novo Government; Political prisoner
- Notable work: A noite mais longa de todas as noites, 1926-1974 (The Longest Night of all)

Helena Pato (born 19 April 1939) was a mathematics teacher, a communist opponent of Portugal's Estado Novo regime and a union leader. She was one of the founders of the Women's Democratic Movement in opposition to the Estado Novo and was held as a political prisoner for 6 months. She has authored three books on her experiences at that time and has also written books on education.

== Early life ==
Maria Helena Martins dos Santos Pato Noales Rodrigues was born in 1939 in Mamarrosa, in the municipality of Oliveira do Bairro in the Aveiro District of Portugal, the daughter of a primary school teacher and an agronomist. She grew up in the Portuguese capital of Lisbon with her parents and twin brothers. At school she recalls being taught and influenced by Maria de Lourdes Pintasilgo, a future Portuguese prime minister. In 1956, she joined the Faculty of Sciences at the University of Lisbon. With left-wing views obtained from her father, and having experienced poverty at first hand while working with the Society of Saint Vincent de Paul on Sundays, her political activity began at the university when she joined the youth wing of the Movement of Democratic Unity (MUD), a quasi-legal platform of democratic organizations that opposed the Estado Novo. She was also the president of the Students' Association of the Faculty of Sciences in 1960. While at university, she was friendly with Paulo Jorge, a future foreign minister of Angola, with whom she discussed anti-colonialism and played table tennis.

In May 1962 she was briefly arrested following a large student protest. In the same year she followed into exile in Paris her husband, Alfredo Nolaes, a journalist and student leader, who she had married in 1960. Nolaes, who would die of lymphoma in 1965, had been previously arrested in 1958 by the PIDE, the International and State Defence Police, (Portuguese: Polícia Internacional e de Defesa do Estado), which was an agency nominally in charge of immigration and emigration control and internal and external State security, but which over time came to be known for its secret police activities. The PIDE permitted him to return to Portugal only when the doctors who treated him declared in writing that he was only a month from death. In Paris, they had met with other communist exiles, such as Maria Lamas, António José Saraiva and Stella Piteira Santos.

== Arrest ==
Pato had joined the Portuguese Communist Party in 1962, having waited some time to be accepted as a member, because of the need to prove her loyalty to the party. Returning to Portugal after her husband's death, she was part of the early efforts to establish the National Commission for Relief for Political Prisoners (Comissão Nacional de Socorro aos Presos Políticos - CNSPP), together with Maria Eugénia Varela Gomes, Aida Paula and others. They collected money for the prisoners and organised petitions for their release. She, herself, was arrested in June 1967 by the PIDE which had intercepted a phone call from another communist party member asking for her help to dispose of a suitcase full of explosives. She had already been under investigation for her involvement in the creation of the Movimento Democrático de Mulheres (Women's Democratic Movement). Pato was held in isolation at Caxias prison near Lisbon and was subjected to sleep torture. She was released in November of the same year. Eight days after being released, the River Tagus flooded north of Lisbon, killing 700 people. Pato joined the rescue mission.

Following the death of her first husband, she married José Manuel Tengarrinha, a friend from her youth. He was a historian and teacher, but was not permitted to work for the government as a teacher and had a history of arrests. Tengarrinha was leader of the Portuguese Democratic Movement (MDM), which was founded in 1969 as an electoral coalition to run in the undemocratic parliamentary elections. Pato was part of the election campaign in 1969 and was the MDM's director from 1969 to 1971. The couple, who separated in 1983, had two children, João and Rosa.

== Carnation Revolution ==
Having completed a degree in mathematics from the University of Coimbra, doing much of the course work while she was in Paris, Pato was finally able to get a job as a mathematics teacher, at the Liceu Gil Vicente in Lisbon in 1970. She immediately became involved in the creation of a teacher organization. On 17 April 1974, fearing a visit from the PIDE, she and her husband had removed lots of compromising documents from their apartment, in some cases by throwing them out of the window or by burning them, but on the morning of the 18th he was arrested by the PIDE and taken to Caxias prison. Shortly after this, on 25 April, the Carnation Revolution overthrew the Estado Novo. After two days of tension, fearing that the PIDE might exert revenge by murdering the prisoners, Pato was present at their release on the 27th. Among those waiting with her were Jorge Sampaio, a future president of Portugal, Francisco Pereira de Moura, who led the MDM's election campaign in 1969, Salgado Zenha, one of the founders of the MUD, and Francisco and Miguel Sousa Tavares, two brothers who were also closely connected with the opposition.

== Later life ==
Pato remained a mathematics teacher for 36 years and was the founder and director of the Teachers' Union of Greater Lisbon (SPGL). In addition to writing books on the teaching of mathematics, she helped to produce science and education supplements in daily newspapers. She led a campaign in 2006 to oppose the transformation of the former PIDE headquarters in Lisbon into a condominium. In 2013 she created the Antifascist Resistance site on the internet, with biographies of more than 400 people who had resisted the dictatorship. In 2019 she joined with others to oppose plans for a museum in memory of the Estado Novo's dictator, António de Oliveira Salazar. Retirement gave her the opportunity to write three memoirs on the time of Portugal's dictatorship.

== Publications ==
Memoirs

- Saudação, Flausinas, Moedas and Simones (2006, Editora Campo das Letras)
- Já uma Estrela se Levanta (2011, Editora Tágide)
- A noite mais longa de todas as noites, 1926-1974 (Edições Colibri, 2018)

Books on Education

- Trabalho de grupo no Ensino Básico : guia prático para professors. (2010, Editora Texto. 13ª ed. Lisbon)
- Dossier de Matemáticca, 9º ano. (2003, 3ª Editora Texto, Lisbon)
