= RTP Mundo (radio) =

International broadcasting service of Portugal

- Portugal; Brazil
- Broadcast area: International (Europe, Africa, South America, North America)

Programming
- Format: Ethnic/International

Ownership
- Owner: Rádio e Televisão de Portugal

History
- First air date: 1936; 90 years ago (as Serviço de Ondas Curtas da Emissora Nacional)
- Former names: RDP Internacional (1988-2026)

Links
- Webcast: RTP Play
- Website: RTP Mundo

RTP Mundo (formerly RDP Internacional), is an international radio broadcasting station of Rádio e Televisão de Portugal. It aims at overseas Portuguese communities in Europe, Africa, South America, North America, India/Middle East as well as East Timor.

== Overview ==
RTP Internacional logo from 2004 to 2016.

RTP Mundo is available worldwide via satellite and Internet, serving most Portuguese-speaking communities in Europe, Africa, North America (United States/ Canada), South America (Brazil), Venezuela and India/Middle East. In Díli (East Timor), RDPi broadcasts also on 105.3 FM, but some programmes are also relayed by Radio Timor Leste, together with local broadcasts.

RDP International's predecessor, the Serviço de Ondas Curtas da Emissora Nacional, launched shortwave transmissions in 1936, which initially served the Portuguese cod fishing fleet in the waters of Newfoundland and Labrador, but by 1939 its remit was extended to provide information, music and Portuguese-language content to the entire Portuguese Empire. An early program was Meia-Hora da Saudade, which in 1939, due to its success, doubled its length and became A Hora da Saudade.

During the old regime, its shortwave transmitter network began to increase, while the Overseas Broadcasting Center (Centro Emissor Ultramarino or CEU) was created in 1948 with 22 stations and formally opened in 1954, at a time when Portuguese India was put under pressure by the newly-independent India. At this time, a dedicated English service started. A second mission in Africa started in 1959 to counter Radio Brazzaville's biased news services, which were attracting audiences in Angola and Mozambique, as well as Portuguese populations in Belgian Congo.

In the early 1960s, CEU broadcast its programs to Portuguese Africa, Guinea and Kenya (in English), India (in English), Portuguese India (in Portuguese and Konkani), Timor, Macao, Brazil, the United States and adjacent islands. In Africa, at the height of the Portuguese Colonial War, it countered subversive propaganda from Radio Brazaville and Radio Senegal, which both carried out services in Portuguese, as well as anti-Salazarist Communist radio stations such as Rádio Portugal Livre and Rádio Voz da Liberdade. EN produced a program denouncing Communist stations, A verdade é só uma, Rádio Moscovo não fala verdade (There's only one truth, Radio Moscow doesn't speak it).

In the 1980s, RDP Internacional continued carrying its Portuguese services (200 hours per week), with additional services in five foreign languages (English, French, Spanish, Italian, German) for 45 hours a week. The shortwave broadcasts were mostly pre-recorded since 1980, but this scheme changed in 1984, enabling a better connection with its listeners. At the end of 1984, the Spanish-language service was discontinued to cut costs, and later, the remaining languages, on weekends. A program aimed at the Portuguese diaspora in Europe, also relayed by Antena 1, started airing. The shortwave broadcasts were expensive, being cut by 23% in 1985. In 1988, the station was renamed RDP Internacional - Rádio Portugal.

RDP Internacional ceased all shortwave transmissions on 1 June 2011. The decision was criticized by Adelino Laranjeira of the Merchant Navy, thinking that RTP would leave the Portuguese diaspora behind.

RTP's main shortwave broadcasting centre, known as "CEOC – Centro Emissor de Onda Curta" (lit. SW transmitting centre) was located near Pegões, Portugal, has four 300 kW shortwave transmitters (1 TELEFUNKEN S 4005 and 3 THALES TSW 2300) and four 100 kW transmitters as backup, which served 6 transmitting antennas. Broadcasts to Venezuela and India/Middle East used only 100 kW because of technical limitations: antennas cannot handle powers above 100 kW. Transmissions to Europe, America and Africa used 300 kW.

RDPi also used ProFunk GmbH centre in Sines, as part of an agreement made between the Portuguese State and Deutsche Welle; since January 2009, weekend broadcasts from Sines used Digital Radio Mondiale (DRM) targeting central Europe.

Although RDP had a radio channel dedicated to Portuguese-speaking Africa countries, RDP África, RDPi covered those countries on shortwave, even in areas not served by RDP África. Nonetheless, some African radios relay some programmes from RDPi, specially Portuguese football games.

Some programmes, in particular newscasts and football games broadcast on RDPi and RDP Antena 1 were also relayed on many Portuguese-speaking radio stations around the world, like Radio Alfa – 98.6 FM Paris (France) and WJFD (Radio Globo) – 97.3 FM Massachusetts (United States).

Final logo as RDP Internacional from 2016 to 29 March 2026.

On 30 March 2026, the station has been renamed as RTP Mundo, tieing in with its television counterpart, after the adoption of a single branding strategy on 18 February 2026. Some of its staff feared job losses as the television channel and the radio station were now put under the same administration. The rebranding was designed by Ivity Brand Corp, a Portuguese design agency responsible for RTP corporate rebrand.
