= Carlos Aboim Inglez =

Portuguese communist politician

Carlos Hahnemann Saavedra Aboim Inglez (January 5, 1930 – February 13, 2002) was a Portuguese communist intellectual, militant and leader of the Portuguese Communist Party (PCP), entering the party in 1946 (at age 16). He was the son of Maria Isabel Aboim Inglez and Carlos Aboim Inglez, both communists and anti-fascists. His wife was Maria Adelaide Aboim Inglez, who was also a communist militant who lived clandestinely with her husband.

In 1953, he was made an official of the PCP. He was sentenced to eight years in Caxias prison by the Estado Novo regime. He showed great interest in Portuguese poetry, most notably through his inclusion of commentaries and notes on poetry in the communist newspaper Avante!. He was interested in the relations between materialistic thought and the medieval controversy between realism and nominalism. He was member elected in European elections and became member of European Parliament.

He asked that when he died he would be cremated to the sound of the Chorus of the Slaves of the opera Nabucco by Verdi.
