= Albina Fernandes =

Portuguese communist and political prisoner

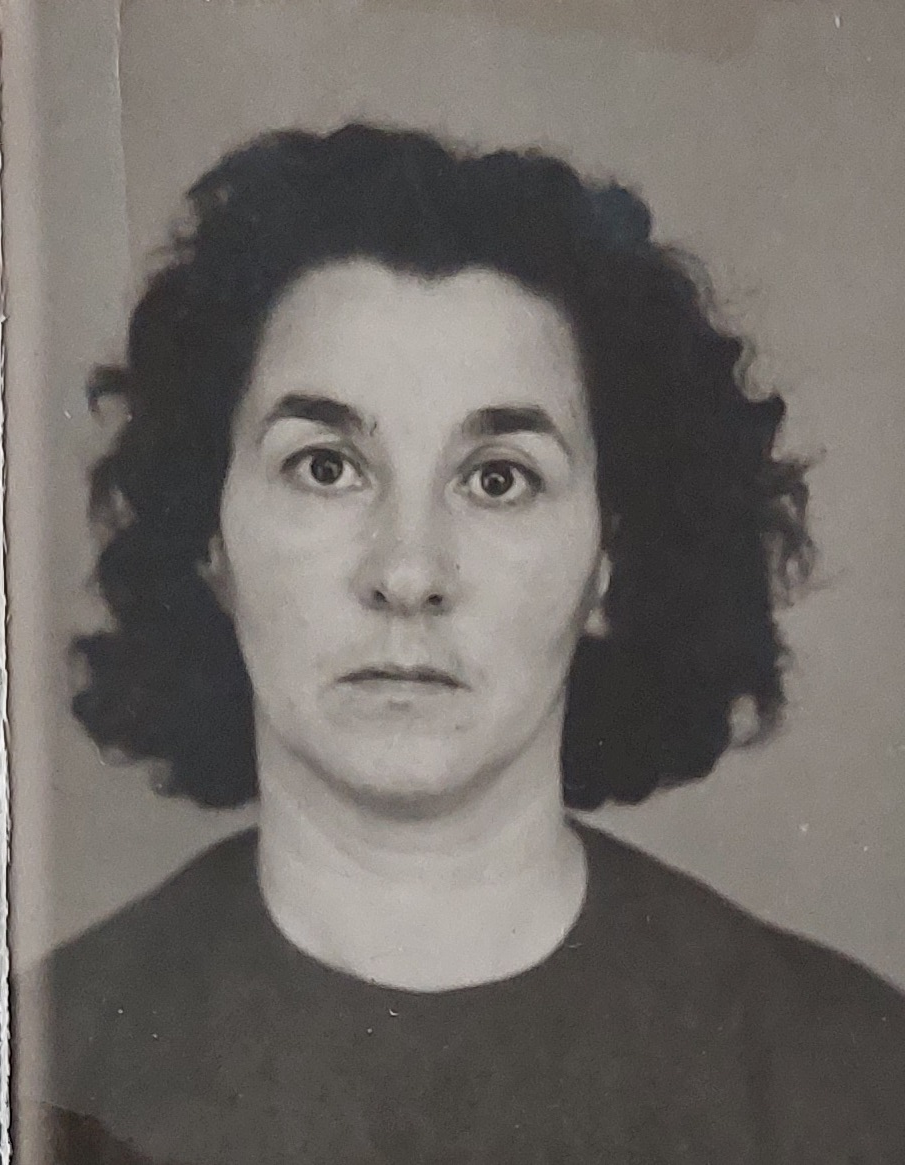
- Born: 5 January 1928; Soissons, France
- Died: 2 October 1970 (aged 42); Lisbon, Portugal
- Other names: Albina Fernandes Pato; Rosália
- Known for: Political prisoner during the Portuguese Estado Novo regime

Albina Fernandes also known as Albina Pato, Albina Fernandes Pato or Rosália (Soissons, France, 5 January 1928 - Lisbon, 2 October 1970) was a militant of the Portuguese Communist Party, opposer to the Estado Novo regime and a fighter of the French Resistance.

== Biography ==
=== Youth ===
Fernandes' parents were Portuguese communists that emigrated to France, where Fernandes was born in 1928, she lived her childhood within the French resistance during the German occupation of France in the context of the Second World War, during which she grows up under the weight of the imminent risk of her parents arrest by the Nazis. She starts her militancy early on in life in the French Communist Youth.

=== Membership of the Portuguese Communist Party ===
After the war, Fernandes moved to Portugal, where she joined the Portuguese Communist Party. She gets married at twenty years old, in 1948, with Alcino de Sousa Ferreira. In October 1949, when her husband became a worker for the PCP, they go through clandestinity together, where they live in Party houses until Alcino de Sousa is arrested under political reasons by PIDE on 12 February 1951.

=== Living clandestinely ===
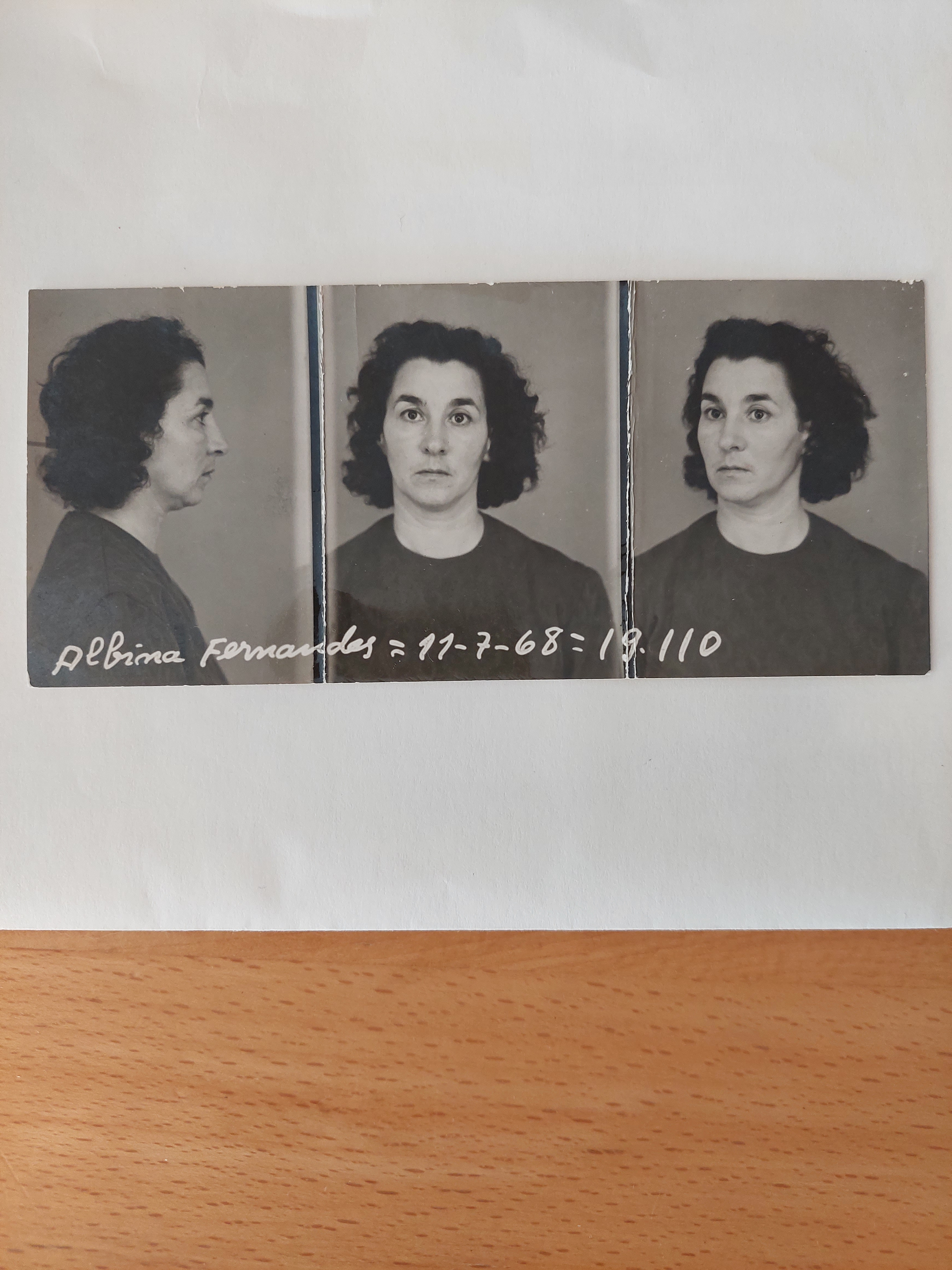
PIDE photograph of Albina Fernandes

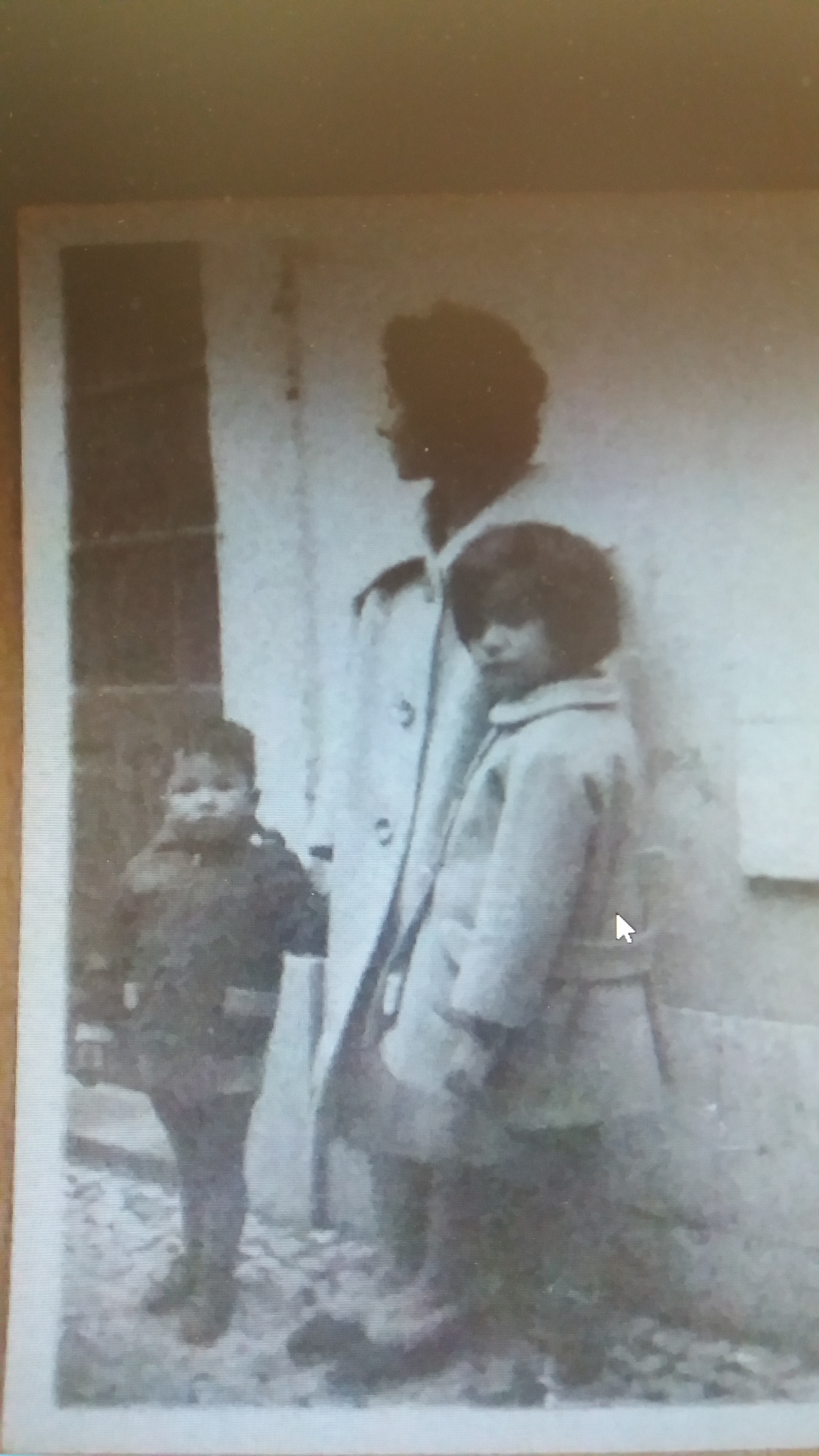
Albina Fernandes with her son Rui and stepdaughter Isabel

Albina Fernandes would live with the pseudonym Rosália for the following 11 years in several clandestine houses across the country, context in which she meets the militant Octávio Pato with whom she starts a relationship. She will be captured by PIDE on 15 December 1961, in the same day in which, in a different place, Octávio Pato will be arrested, and taken with her children to Caxias prison. The couples children, Rui Pato, then 2 years old, and Isabel, then 6 years old and the biological daughter of Antónia Joaquina Monteiro, were held captive with Albina Fernandes in the cell, where Fernandes slept with her knees on the floor while holding on to the wrists of the children while they lied on the bed, so that they wouldn't be taken during the night while she slept. Something that PIDE tried to do shortly after, under the intention of putting the children in an institution under the pretext that Albina Fernandes and Octávio Pato weren't married, in addition to their children not being registered given that they were born in a clandestine situation. Albina Fernandes would refuse to let go of her children's hand during her whole prison stay, her PIDE identification photograph became famous because the PIDE agents were unable to remove Rui Pato from her lap, illustrative of her determination. Fernandes' intransigence in demanding that her children would be given to their grandparents in her presence was successful after 25 days together in the prison cell, having her children given to their paternal grandparents on 10 January 1962.

Fernandes in prison with her son

=== Imprisonment ===
Fernandes' trial would happen in the same day as Pato's that was being held in the Peniche Fortress, on 17 November 1962, almost an year after her arrest. She was sentenced to three years in jail and a loss of political rights for 15 years, however, she would be arbitrarily imprisoned for 6 years and 7 months in the dungeons of the Estado Novo regime in Caxias, where she was brutally tortured physically and psychologically. On November 1966, communist militants started a petition, signed by many citizens, appealing for her release as she had served her sentence and due to her health decline caused by the mistreatment in prison. Only two years later, on 9 July 1968, would Fernandes be granted parole.

=== Death ===
On her release Fernandes campaigned for the release of Pato, without success. With her mental state extremely weakened by the years of imprisonment, she committed suicide on October 2, 1970. The event was denounced by the National Commission for Relief to Political Prisoners (CNSPP). Its members, including Maria Eugénia Varela Gomes and Sophia de Mello Breyner Andresen, held the Government directly responsible for the "tragic event, a consequence that is not only the result of a long period in prison suffering inhumane conditions but also the cruel uncertainty regarding the situation of her husband", whose sentence in Peniche had been arbitrarily extended. Sofia de Oliveira Ferreira, the woman that spent the longest time arrested by PIDE, declared that the health decline of Albina Fernandes was due to the negligence of the PIDE doctor José Godinho Barata that never helped her during the numerous nervous crises that she suffered in jail.
