= Rádio Portugal Livre =

Radio station run by the Portuguese Communist Party

Rádio Portugal Livre (RPL) was a radio station in Portuguese run by the Portuguese Communist Party (PCP). From 1962 until 1974 it broadcast on shortwave from Bucharest, Romania in opposition to Portugal's authoritarian Estado Novo regime.

The first broadcast by RPL took place on 12 March 1962. Bucharest was chosen as its base because Romania welcomed foreign opposition movements. However, the station functioned clandestinely, often announcing that it was coming from Prague or Moscow. Some in Portugal assumed that the broadcasts came from the remote Portuguese mountain range of Serra da Estrela. These underground operations were in contrast to the PCP's Rádio Voz da Liberdade, which used the facilities of Radio Algiers and freely admitted this.

The station presented interviews with PCP figures, including the party's leader, Álvaro Cunhal, who was living in Moscow, and also gave full readings from the PCP newspapers Avante! and O Militante. The staff in the Bucharest office never exceeded eight people. Among those who worked there were Maria Alda Nogueira and Margarida Tengarrinha. The singer, Luísa Basto, was a regular performer, popularising the song Avante Camarada (Forward comrade), which became the anthem of the Portuguese Communist Party.

Broadcasts were presented every 30 minutes between 07.00 and 19.00, at 21.15 and at midnight, and usually lasted for 20 minutes. On Sundays, the station broadcast a programme aimed especially at farmers and on Saturdays a programme called "The Voice of the Armed Forces".

The station closed in October 1974 after the 25 April 1974 Carnation Revolution, which overthrew the Estado Novo and ended censorship.
