= Fernanda de Paiva Tomás =

Portuguese communist and political prisoner under the Estado Novo

- Photo of Paiva Tomás taken when she was first arrested in 1950
- Born: Maria Fernanda de Paiva Tomás; 8 November 1928; Mortágua, Portugal
- Died: 15 September 1984 (aged 55)
- Known for: Political prisoner under the Estado Novo in Portugal

Fernanda de Paiva Tomás (8 November 1928 – 15 September 1984) was a member of the Portuguese Communist Party who spent close to a decade as a political prisoner, from 1961 to 1970, under the authoritarian Estado Novo regime.

== Early life ==
Maria Fernanda de Paiva Tomás was born on 8 November 1928, in Mortágua, in the Viseu district of Portugal. She attended the Faculty of Arts at the University of Lisbon. Coming from a family of Communist Party supporters, she married Joaquim Augusto Cruz Carreira, who was also a communist activist.

== Communist Party and imprisonment ==
Paiva Tomás was detained by the police twice as a student for taking part in anti-war demonstrations, the first time when she went to put flowers on a World War I memorial. At the age of 23 in 1952 she went underground, working for the Movement of Democratic Unity, of which the Portuguese Communist Party was a member. Her husband was arrested in 1958 and sentenced to four years in prison. For nine years she worked with O Militante, the Communist Party magazine, until she was also arrested on 6 February 1961. Held in Caxias prison near Lisbon, she was tortured with two periods of sleep deprivation lasting 80 and 94 hours, and being held incommunicado for 20 days with no change of clothes, to try to get her to reveal the location of the Communist Party's planned Fifth Congress. According to the Portuguese secret police, using the pseudonyms of "Ana" and "Marques", she had served as a member of the central management of the Lisbon regional organization of the Communist Party, controlling the eastern sector of the capital, and was an alternate member of the Party's Central Committee in 1960.

Paiva Tomás was the author of one of thirteen letters included in a manifesto sent clandestinely from the prison in May 1961 and directed to "women's and democratic organizations in the whole world", in which torture was denounced and the conditions under which opponents of the Estado Novo regime were held were criticised. While in prison she met Julieta Gandra, with whom she would live after her release. Their relationship, carried out in full sight of the other prisoners, led to considerable criticism and hostility but was tolerated by the authorities.

== Release from prison ==
Having been sentenced to eight years in prison and having served eight years and six months, Paiva Tomás was due to be released in September 1969. However, her sentence was extended because she was deemed to be a security risk. In 1970, her son, Alberto, at the age of 15, wrote to the Portuguese president, Marcelo Caetano, to protest against her detention. Shortly after, she agreed to sign a document stating that she would abstain "from acts whose performance may be of interest" to the Communist Party. Three weeks later, on 19 November 1970, Paiva Tomás was released. After the Carnation Revolution and the fall of the Estado Novo in 1974, she went in 1975, together with Julieta Gandra, to Angola. Gandra had been asked to go there to set up a national health service for Angola prior to its independence and Paiva Tomás worked in the Ministry of Education.

Maria Fernanda de Paiva Tomás died on 15 September 1984, from a brain tumor.
