= Isaura Borges Coelho =

Portuguese nurse and activist (1926–2019)

- Born: Isaura Assunção da Silva; 20 June 1926; Portimão, Portugal
- Died: 11 June 2019 (aged 92); Parede, Portugal
- Other names: Isaura Assunção da Silva Borges Coelho
- Occupation: Nurse
- Known for: Spending four years as a political prisoner for organising nurses to object to rules barring married women from nursing

Isaura Borges Coelho (1926 - 2019), was a Portuguese nurse and activist. She is known for her efforts in favour of nurses' rights, for which she was imprisoned and tortured by the Portuguese dictatorship's political police.

== Early years and training ==
Isaura Assunção da Silva Borges Coelho was born in the city of Portimão in the Faro District of Portugal on 20 June 1926. She demonstrated her ability to help others at an early age having, at the age of eleven, saved a girl from drowning in the sea. When she was 16, she avoided a railway accident when she alerted a train to brake, because an animal-drawn vehicle had become stuck at a level crossing. She was then subjected to a lawsuit for delaying the train. After completing school, she studied at a Nursing School, between 1949 and 1952.

== Professional career and activism ==
Coelho began work in 1952, at the Hospital de Santo António dos Capuchos in Lisbon. There, she witnessed poor working conditions that included thirty mandatory night shifts that were supposed to last only twelve hours but often lasted 24. Nurses working under such conditions often had only one day off per week. She began to fight for better service conditions, one of her first initiatives being the organization of a petition, addressed to the Prime Minister, António de Oliveira Salazar; Manuel Gonçalves Cerejeira, the Patriarch of Lisbon; and the Chief Nurse of hospitals, in protest against a law that prohibited nurses from marrying. This petition, which managed to gather 700 signatures from nurses in Coelho's hospital alone, was made following the dismissal of twelve of her colleagues for having married without authorization. The law that prohibited nurses from marrying was only repealed in 1963 after several years of protests.

In 1953, Coelho was arrested by the PIDE, the International and State Defence Police of the Estado Novo regime, together with some colleagues when they were visiting the Youth branch of the Movement of Democratic Unity (MUD), which opposed the Estado Novo. The others were eventually released, but Coelho was detained because she was recognised by the secret police as being responsible for the nurses' petition, which had led to her becoming known by them as the “matchmaker”. She was tortured, and was beaten and dragged by the hair in front of her lawyer, who was also violently attacked. Reports of her treatment sparked protests, including the distribution of leaflets for her release. At the time of the trial, the political police used a common ploy by their agents to occupy public seating in the courtroom, thereby denying her supporters access. However, some of them managed to enter the courtroom, including the writers Alexandre O'Neill and Maria Lamas.

Coelho's lawyer was arrested days before the trial, making it impossible for Coelho to properly present her defence. She was sentenced to two years in prison with the possibility of extension. Also, she lost her political rights (to vote, to stand for parliament, etc.) for a period of fifteen years. The reasons for her conviction were her membership of MUD, for having accused the PIDE of inflicting moral and physical torture on prisoners, for having demanded minimum conditions of work in hospitals, and for protesting against the fact that nurses could not be married. The news of her conviction sparked further protests.

== Release from prison ==
Coelho was held for four years in Caxias prison, leaving only in 1957 after a national and international campaign. When she left, she was in very poor health, weighing only 30 kilograms, having already been hospitalized during her incarceration. After leaving prison, she stayed in hospital for some months. She had previously had a friendship with António Borges Coelho, a historian also opposed to the government, who had been imprisoned for six years for being a member of the Youth MUD and the Portuguese Communist Party. After her release she was denied permission to visit him in the Estado Novo prison at Peniche Fortress. However, they managed to communicate through intermediaries and married in the prison on 4 January 1959, becoming trailblazers for future prison marriages. She then returned to Portimão, where she lived for about a year with her parents, still being watched by the political police. She was later allowed to return to Lisbon, where she studied at the Instituto Português de Oncologia Francisco Gentil. She was then employed by the Liga dos Hospitais (League of Hospitals) but was eventually expelled for her political activism. Since this meant she was prohibited from working in public hospitals, she found work in a private maternity clinic.

== After the Carnation Revolution ==
Following the Carnation Revolution of 25 April 1974, which overthrew the Estado Novo regime, Coelho was invited to the position of chief nurse at the government hospitals of Lisbon, an offer she refused, remaining instead at the maternity clinic, where she was the union delegate for nurses at the Portuguese Nurses Union. In 2002, she was awarded the Portuguese Order of Freedom.

The story of her life and that of her sister Hortênsia da Silva Campos Lima, who was also imprisoned, was told in 2000 in a documentary film by Susana de Sousa Dias, Enfermeiras no Estado Novo (Nurses of the Estado Novo).

Coelho died on 11 June 2019, in the parish of Parede. She and António Borges Coelho had one daughter.
