= Fort of King Luís I =

19th Century fort in Lisbon, Portugal now used as a prison

- Forte-prisão de Caxias
- Oeiras, Near Lisbon in Portugal

Site information
- Type: Fort
- Owner: Portuguese Republic
- Operator: Ministry of Justice, Portugal

Location
- Coordinates: 38°42′16″N 9°16′00″W

Site history
- Built: 1879-86
- In use: as a prison

The Fort of King Luís I (Forte D. Luís I), also referred to as the Fort of Caxias (Forte de Caxias) and the Fort-prison of Caxias (Forte-prisão de Caxias), is located in the parish of Caxias, in the municipality of Oeiras in the Lisbon district of Portugal. It presently functions as a prison.

Built between 1879 and 1886 it was intended as one of a number of forts, known as the Campo Entrincheirado of Lisbon, that formed a defensive perimeter that followed the boundaries of Lisbon at the time. It consisted of two separate strongholds, the north and the south. Originally called the Fort of Caxias, it was renamed as the Fort of King Luís I in 1901 in honour of the king who died in 1889.

The fort was first used as a prison in 1916 when a group of soldiers who mutinied were arrested. In 1917 it was used to house construction workers who had gone on strike and in the same year telegraph workers on strike were also held there. From 1935 the southern part of the fort was used by the Estado Novo dictatorship as a political prison, which included torture chambers, and this continued until Portugal’s Carnation Revolution, when its doors were opened on April 25, 1974. It was subsequently used briefly to detain right-wing politicians. The fort was transferred to Portugal’s Prison Service in December 1988.

Although the fort was not generally used by the Estado Novo to accommodate the communist party’s top leaders, who were mainly held in the Peniche Fortress, it did witness a mass escape on 4 December 1961 when eight communist party members were able to escape in an armoured car, which they succeeded in smashing through the main gate. The driver had taken a long time gaining the confidence of the guards by convincing them that he had rejected communism and was now on their side. In this way he was able to gain access to the vehicle, which was normally used for President Salazar.

== Past prisoners ==
- Aida Magro
- Aida Paula
- Albina Fernandes
- Cândida Ventura
- Carlos Aboim Inglez
- Cesina Bermudes
- Conceição Matos
- Domingos Abrantes
- Fábio Paím
- Fernanda de Paiva Tomás
- Georgette Ferreira
- Helena Pato
- Isabel do Carmo
- Isaura Borges Coelho
- Ivone Dias Lourenço
- José Magro
- Julieta Gandra
- Júlio Pomar
- Maria Adelaide Aboim Inglez
- Maria Alda Nogueira
- Maria dos Santos Machado
- Maria Eugénia Varela Gomes
- Maria Luísa Costa Dias
- Mário Soares
- Maria Rosa Viseu
- Sid Ahmed Rezala
- Sofia Ferreira
- Sofia Pomba Guerra
- Stella Piteira Santos
