= Maria Adelaide Aboim Inglez =

Portuguese communist and opponent of the Estado Novo regime

- Born: Maria Adelaide Dias Coelho; 27 March 1932; Castelo Branco, Portugal,
- Died: 29 February 2008 (Aged 75); Lisbon
- Other names: Maria Adelaide Dias Coelho Aboim Inglez
- Known for: Opposition to the Estado Novo

Maria Adelaide Dias Coelho Aboim Inglez (Castelo Branco, 1932 – Lisbon, 2008) was a Portuguese politician and communist and anti-fascist revolutionary, and a militant of the Portuguese Communist Party. She was arrested twice for political motives, and was held hostage for a total of two years in Caxias Prison.

== Biography ==
=== Early life ===
Maria Adelaide Dias Coelho was born in Castelo Branco, Portugal on 27 March 1932. She was the daughter of Alfredo Dias Coelho and Juliana Augusta Dias Coelho, who were active communists. She had 8 siblings. One brother was José Dias Coelho, a painter and sculptor who played an important role in the Portuguese Communist Party (PCP) and was murdered by the PIDE, the political police of the Estado Novo. The family moved to Coimbra in 1925 because of the father's work, who was placed in Castelo Branco in 1930, where Maria Adelaide Dias Coelho would be born two years later.

Twenty years after, in October 1952, the beginning of her political activity occurs when she is arrested for political reasons by PIDE, just for collecting signatures in support of a peace treaty between the Great Powers and for the prohibition of nuclear weapons. She remained in Caxias prison near Lisbon for five months, being released in March 1953 without ever going to trial.

=== Membership of the Communist Party ===
In 1953, when she was 21, she married Carlos Aboim Inglez, a prominent PCP militant, that would be jailed for political reasons by the Estado Novo for a total of 10 years of his life. She then became the daughter-in-law of Maria Isabel Aboim Inglez. She joined the PCP shortly after getting married and the couple went underground in the same day as her brother José Dias Coelho and his wife Margarida Tengarrinha, whom were part of the PCP's clandestine network.

=== Political prison ===
In June 1959, the day after her husband had been arrested for political reaspns, she was arrested for the second time, when the clandestine house where she lived with her husband and daughter, Margarida, was visited by the PIDE. She locked the door, in order to give time to burn papers that could betray her collaborators, while the police fired at the lock to break it open. Aboim Inglez and her daughter, then 4 years old, were taken to the PIDE headquarters in the António Maria Cardoso Street. Aboim Inglez demanded that her daughter be handed over to her grandmother, Maria Isabel Aboim Inglês, which happened only about a week after her arrest.

During her time in prison, Aboim Inglez was repeatedly punished for refusing to comply with the regulations and it was not until October 1960 that she was formally tried in court, when she was acquitted for lack of evidence and released. She was tried again on another case in January 1961 and was then given an 18-month suspended sentence.

=== Clandestine life ===
When free, she continued to carry out illegal political tasks for the PCP, supporting political prisoners and campaigning for their liberation. She will live in hiding for 10 years of her life.

=== Refugee in Moscow ===
Between 1968 and 1975 and by the PCP's decision, the possibility of escaping to Moscow with her husband and two daughters, Margarida and Isabel, is given to her.

=== After the Carnation Revolution ===
After the 25 April 1974 Carnation Revolution that overthrew the Estado Novo, Maria Adelaide Aboim Inglez returned to Portugal and worked at the headquarters of the PCP as a bookkeeper. A few years later, she moved to a Communist Party bookstore, where she worked until a few days before her death, when she suffered a heart-attack. She died on 29 February 2008.

== Bibliography ==
- Memórias de Uma Falsificadora. A luta na Clandestinidade pela Liberdade, Margarrida Tengarrinha, 2018
