= Sofia Ferreira =

Portuguese communist and political prisoner (1922 – 2010)

- Photo of Ferreira taken on the day of her first arrest
- Born: Sofia de Oliveira Ferreira; 1 May 1922; Alhandra, Portugal
- Died: 22 April 2010 (Aged 87); Lisbon, Portugal
- Known for: Spending 13 years in prison under the Estado Novo regime in Portugal
- Spouse: António Santo

Sofia Ferreira (1922 – 2010) was a prominent member of the Portuguese Communist Party (PCP). She was imprisoned for more than 13 years for her opposition to the Estado Novo regime.

== Early life ==
Sofia de Oliveira Ferreira was born on 1 May 1922 in Alhandra in the Portuguese municipality of Vila Franca de Xira. A daughter of agricultural workers she was a sister of Georgette Ferreira and Mercedes Ferreira who, like Sofia, both became members of the Communist Party. By the age of ten she was working on farms together with her mother. At the age of twelve, Ferreira went to live with her godparents in Lisbon, doing housework and taking care of the elderly. It was only at this stage that she learnt to read, with help from a neighbour, who also taught her basic mathematics skills. At the age of 20, she began to serve as a domestic servant in a private home.

== Clandestine activities ==
Ferreira joined the Communist Party (PCP) in 1945. Although older than Georgette and Mercedes, she was the last to join the Party. In 1946, she was selected by the PCP for clandestine work in Figueira da Foz. For two years she lived and worked in an isolated house on a farm in which there was a printing press for the publication, O Militante, a magazine for PCP members, together with other communist party propaganda materials. She was then given the role of living in a support house in Luso for the PCP Secretariat, pretending to be the wife of the de facto PCP leader Álvaro Cunhal, and using the pseudonym "Elvira". In this house, on 25 March 1949, she, Cunhal, and Militão Ribeiro were arrested by the PIDE, the Estado Novo's secret police.

== First imprisonment ==
Ferreira was subjected to long sessions of interrogation, with torture, in the PIDE headquarters in Porto. Refusing to make any statements or sign records of the interrogations, she was then held in complete isolation for six months, with visits only allowed every 15 days and for just 15 minutes. In May 1950 she was sentenced to 18 months in prison, a sentence that was later extended, leading to her eventual release in February 1953. She then moved to Porto, involving herself in local organization of the PCP. In 1957, although she did not participate in person at the illegal 5th Congress of the PCP, she was elected as an alternate member of the Central Committee of the Portuguese Communist Party.

== Second imprisonment ==
Ferreira was detained again on 28 May 1959 in Lisbon, together with her partner António Santo. She was tried one year later, receiving a sentence of 5 years and 6 months in prison. She eventually ended up being held in the Caxias prison near Lisbon for 9 years and three months, regularly being punished for any small infraction. She was only rarely allowed visits and not allowed to attend her mother's funeral in 1965. Ferreira was released on 6 August 1968. In November, she married António Santo, who was released at the same time, and, shortly after, they left in secret for the Soviet Union, where they spent 18 months trying to recover from the prison experience. When they returned to Portugal, she again became involved in clandestine activities, first in Setúbal and later in Lisbon.

== After the Carnation Revolution ==
The Carnation Revolution on 24 April 1974 led to the overthrow of the Estado Novo. Ferreira continued to be a member of the Central Committee of the PCP until 1988. From 1987 she was a member of the working group on the historical archive of the PCP. She died in Lisbon on 22 April 2010.
