= Maria Alda Nogueira =

Portuguese communist, feminist, anti-fascist activist, and politician

- Born: 19 March 1923; Lisbon, Portugal
- Died: 5 March 1998 (Aged 74); Lisbon
- Occupations: Teacher, writer, member of parliament
- Known for: Nine years as a political prisoner

Maria Alda Nogueira (1923–1988) was a communist and feminist activist who opposed Portugal's Estado Novo regime and spent nine years as a political prisoner. After the overthrow of the Estado Novo she became a parliamentary deputy, serving in the National Assembly for a decade.

== Early life ==
Maria Alda Nogueira was born in the Portuguese capital of Lisbon on 19 March 1923. Her mother was a seamstress and her father a locksmith and they lived in a working-class neighbourhood. As a school student she was the student president and worked for International Red Aid, collecting clothing for Spaniards fighting Franco in the Spanish Civil War. She finished a degree in Physical-Chemical Sciences from the University of Lisbon in 1945-1946 and then became a teacher, working for three years at a school in Olhão in the Algarve, while also teaching a night school for women, before returning to teach in the Lisbon area.

== Activism ==
In 1946, Nogueira joined the Associação Feminina Portuguesa para a Paz (Portuguese Women's Association for Peace - AFPP), an association created in 1935, and she was concerned early on with the issue of women's emancipation. In 1945, she met Maria Lamas and worked with her at the Conselho Nacional das Mulheres Portuguesas (National Council of Portuguese Women - CNMP) at a time when the CNMP was very active. She took part in the "Exhibition of Books Written by Women", organized by the CNMP in January 1947, making a presentation on "A woman and Science". It was immediately after this event that the CNMP was closed down by the Estado Novo regime in 1947. She had joined the Portuguese Communist Party (PCP) in 1942 and went underground in 1949, following the arrest and torture of communist leaders Álvaro Cunhal, Militão Ribeiro and Sofia Ferreira. Hoping that this underground existence would be brief and she could soon resume her academic studies and the scholarship she hoped to have with Irène Joliot-Curie in Paris, she set up a clandestine house with Sérgio Vilarigues. They had a son in December 1953, who, before turning four, went to live with his maternal grandmother. During her time underground she actively collaborated in the writing of the PCP magazine Avante!. Another of the tasks she had was to mobilize and organize communist women.

== Imprisonment and exile ==
Nogueira was elected to the PCP's Central Committee in 1957 at the Fifth Secret Congress of the Party. On 4 October 1959 she was arrested by Portugal's secret police while travelling in a taxi in Lisbon. Tried on 22 October 1960, she was sentenced to 8 years in Caxias prison near Lisbon, the first woman in Portugal to receive such a long sentence for political reasons. A few years after her release she again returned to the clandestine life, in 1970, making her way to exile in the Soviet Union and Romania, where she worked at Rádio Portugal Livre, which was broadcasting propaganda to Portugal. She ended up in Belgium, where she was on 25 April 1974, the day of the Carnation Revolution that saw the overthrow of the Estado Novo.

== A parliamentarian ==
Returning to Portugal, she became a parliamentary deputy, first in the Constituent Assembly in 1975 and then in the Assembly of the Republic from 1976-86. She was Vice-President of the PCP parliamentary group and President of the Parliamentary Commission on the Female Condition from 1983 to 1985. As well as her activities as a parliamentarian, Nogueira became an active member of the Movimento Democrático de Mulheres (Democratic Women's Movement - MDM). Set up originally in 1968 to oppose the Estado Novo, after the Carnation Revolution the MDM refocussed to address women's rights.

== An author ==
She was the author of several books for children, which she had started to write in jail. The Journey in a Drop of Water and The Journey in a Flower were inspired by the questions that her brother and son, as children, asked her. She also authored Things are also angry. She wrote for the Jornal do Fundão newspaper and in the magazines Modas e Bordados and Os Nossos Filhos.

Maria Alda Nogueira died in Lisbon on March 5, 1998. Her funeral was attended by the Portuguese president, Jorge Sampaio.

== Awards and honours ==
- A stone bust of Nogueira, by sculptor António Trindade, is in the cloister of the Assembly of the Republic. She is just one of only two female deputies to have had this honour, the other being Natália Correia.
- She was awarded the Portuguese Order of Liberty in 1987.
- Her name appears in the toponymy of Seixal, Almada and Amadora in Portugal.
- In 1987 she received an Honourable Distinction from the MDM.
- A book on her life was published by the National Assembly in 2019, written by Maria Alice Dias de Albergaria Samara.
