= Georgette Ferreira =

Portuguese communist, political prisoner and politician

Member of the Assembly of the Republic of Portugal
- In office 1976–1985
- Parliamentary group: Portuguese Communist Party
- Constituency: Lisbon

Member of the Constituent Assembly of Portugal
- In office 1975–1976

Personal details
- Born: 25 June 1925 Alhandra, Portugal
- Died: 4 February 2017 (Aged 91) Lisbon, Portugal
- Party: Portuguese: Portuguese Communist Party

Georgette Ferreira (1925 – 2017) was a member of the Central Committee of the Portuguese Communist Party (PCP) from 1950 to 1988 who opposed the Estado Novo regime and was the first woman to escape from an Estado Novo political prison. She was a Deputy in the Constituent Assembly of Portugal in 1975 and 1976 and a Deputy in the Assembly of the Republic from 1976 to 1985, on all occasions being elected on the Lisbon list of the PCP.

== Early life ==
Georgette de Oliveira Ferreira was born in Alhandra in the Portuguese municipality of Vila Franca de Xira on 25 June 1925. A daughter of agricultural workers, she was a sister of Sofia Ferreira who, like Georgette, became a member of the Communist Party. She started working in the fields when she was 8, when living with her godparents. At the age of 16 she returned to the family home, where her mother was very ill, and became a textile worker. She joined the PCP in 1943, and in the same year organized a strike in her factory for an increase in wages, which ended up in her being dismissed. In 1945 she went underground, living clandestinely while working for the PCP and carrying out secretarial and organizational work.

== Arrests ==
On 28 August 1945, Ferreira narrowly escaped arrest when she was living with her partner, António Assunção Tavares. In 1946, she participated in the illegal 2nd Congress of the PCP, which was held in Lousã near Coimbra. She was arrested in 1949 in the town of Palmela, together with António Dias Lourenço, and held at Caxias prison near Lisbon. During her imprisonment, a stomach illness she had been suffering from worsened. She was urgently hospitalized at the Santo António dos Capuchos Hospital, from which she escaped, with outside assistance, on 4 October 1950, becoming the first woman to escape from an Estado Novo political prison. She then moved to Porto, where she lived with Clementina Amália, adopting the pseudonym of "Helena". She remained in Porto until 1952. In 1954 she was arrested for a second time, not being released until 1959. She was seriously ill while in prison.

== Exile ==
In 1959 Ferreira moved to Prague in the former Czechoslovakia, joining other exiles such as Cândida Ventura and Carlos Brito. She stayed at several sanatoriums in order to cure a lung disease. While in Prague and, later, Paris, she represented the PCP at various international conferences. In 1965, she returned to Portugal and again went into hiding, in the Setúbal area, this time using the pseudonym of "Paiva". She stayed underground until the Carnation Revolution of 25 April 1974 overthrew the Estado Novo.

== After the Carnation Revolution ==
After the Carnation Revolution, Ferreira was a member of the Constituent Assembly of Portugal in 1975 – 1976, which established Portugal's new constitution. She then became a Deputy in the Assembly of the Republic, serving from 1976 to 1985. Her activities in the Assembly included proposing bills related to women's reproductive rights and family planning. Between 1953 and 1988 she was part of the Central Committee of the PCP. Georgette Ferreira died in Lisbon on 4 February 2017.
