= Avante! Festival =

Cultural festival organised by the Portuguese Communist Party

Avante! Festival Festa do Avante!
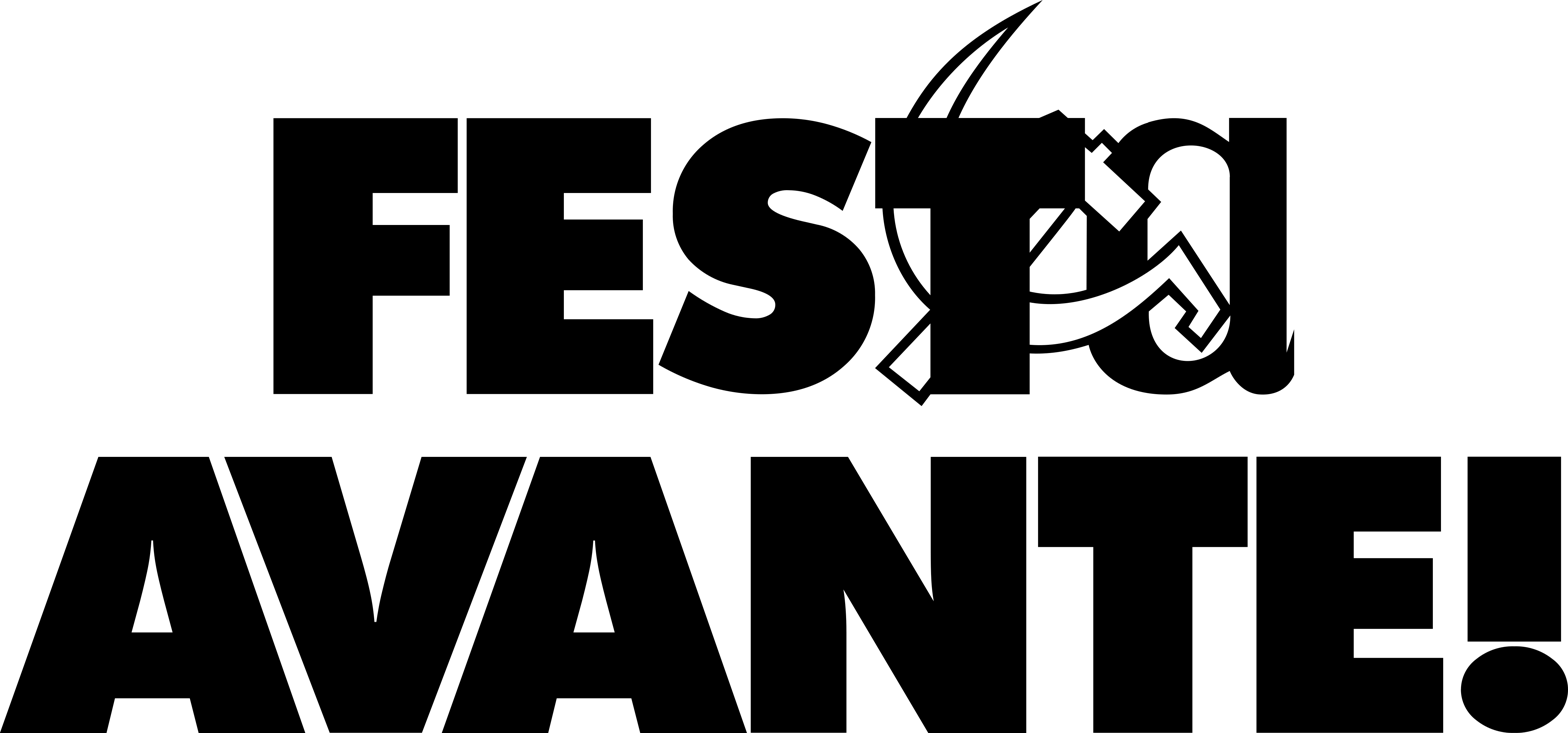
- Genre: Cultural
- Dates: First Friday, Saturday and Sunday of September
- Locations: Amora, Seixal, Portugal
- Years active: 1976 – present
- Founders: Portuguese Communist Party
- Website: www.festadoavante.pcp.pt

The Avante! Festival (Portuguese: Festa do Avante!, lit. 'Onward! Party') is an annual cultural festival held during the first weekend of September. It was started in 1976 by the Portuguese Communist Party and is named after the party's official newspaper, Avante!

After taking part in different locations around Lisbon, like the Feira Internacional de Lisboa, Ajuda and Loures, the festival is now held in Amora, a town near Seixal in a ground bought by the party after a massive fundraising campaign in the early 90s. The campaign was considered by the party as the only way to avoid the boycott organised by the owners of the previous festivals grounds, that culminated in 1987 with the festival not having been held after 11 editions. The festival usually sees hundreds of thousands of visitors, making the outside of the ground appear like a gigantic camping park. The festival consists of a three-day music festival, with the participation of hundreds of Portuguese and international bands and artists in five different stages, ethnography, gastronomy, debates, a book & music fair, theatre (Avanteatro), cinema (Cineavante) and sporting events. Several foreign communist parties also participate.

In 28 editions, the festival has hosted several famous artists, Portuguese and foreign, like Chico Buarque, Baden Powell, Ivan Lins, Buffy Sainte-Marie, Holly Near, Johnny Clegg, Charlie Haden, Judy Collins, Richie Havens, Tom Paxton, The Soviet Circus Company, the Kuban Cossacks Choir, Dexys Midnight Runners, The Band, Hevia, Adriano Correia de Oliveira, Carlos Paredes, Jorge Palma, Manoel de Oliveira and many others.

The preparation of the festival begins right after the end of the previous festival. Hundreds of party members and their friends, mostly young people, volunteer for the hard work of building a small town in a few months.

The Avante! Festival has the capacity for over 100,000 people. It tends to be at full capacity during the days of the festival.

== History ==
=== Context ===
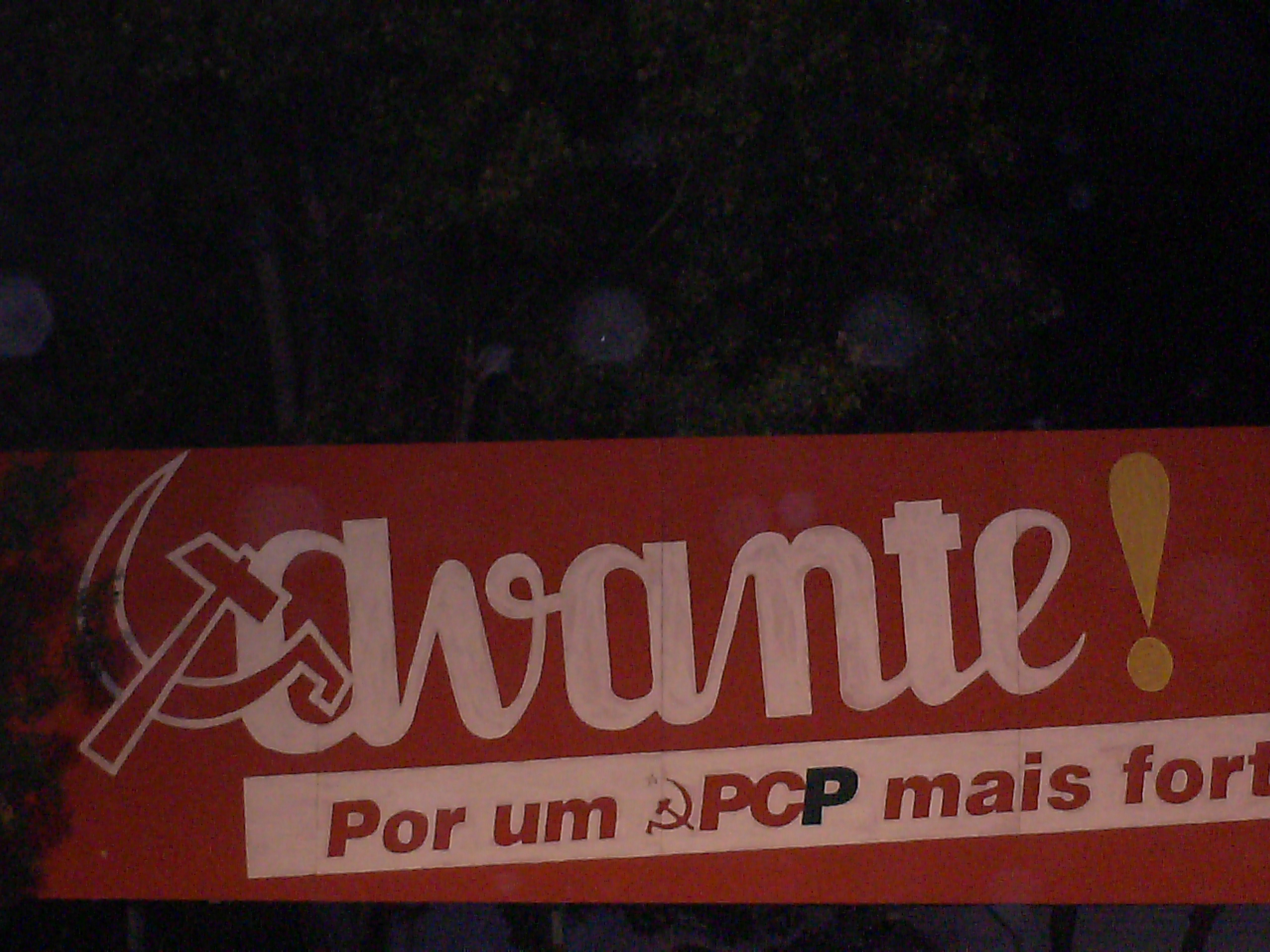
Poster in reference to the Avante! Festival in 2009

Its creation was thought shortly after the Carnation Revolution, where the Portuguese Communist Party leaves its clandestine status and the Estado Novo dictatorship ends.

It exists in the context of the dismantling and nationalization of the big economical groups, the agrarian reform with the expropriation of the big latitudinarians and the creation of the Collective Units of Production controlled by the PCP, achievements of workers' rights, and the most relevant reason to understand how the Avante! Festival started – the «big campaigns of cultural dynamization». With the achievement of freedom of speech, in this context there is the Grupo de Ação Cultural (Cultural Action Group) and the collective artistic creation, «of imported collectivist inspiration», even though these initiatives were not exclusive to the PCP. The cultural manifestations of the masses in 1974/1075 was the most significant factor that led to the festivals creation.

The festival would allow for the making of cultural and socializing initiatives as a part of political intervention, continuing the practice that was previously clandestine before April 25.

== Editions ==
=== 1976 edition ===
The first edition of Avante! was in September 1976, in the old International Fair of Lisbon. The location was used by the PCP in 1974/75 for New Year's parties and initiatives of the Avante! newspaper. However, there were problems with its small size and security problems, namely a bomb attack three days before its opening.

== Gallery ==
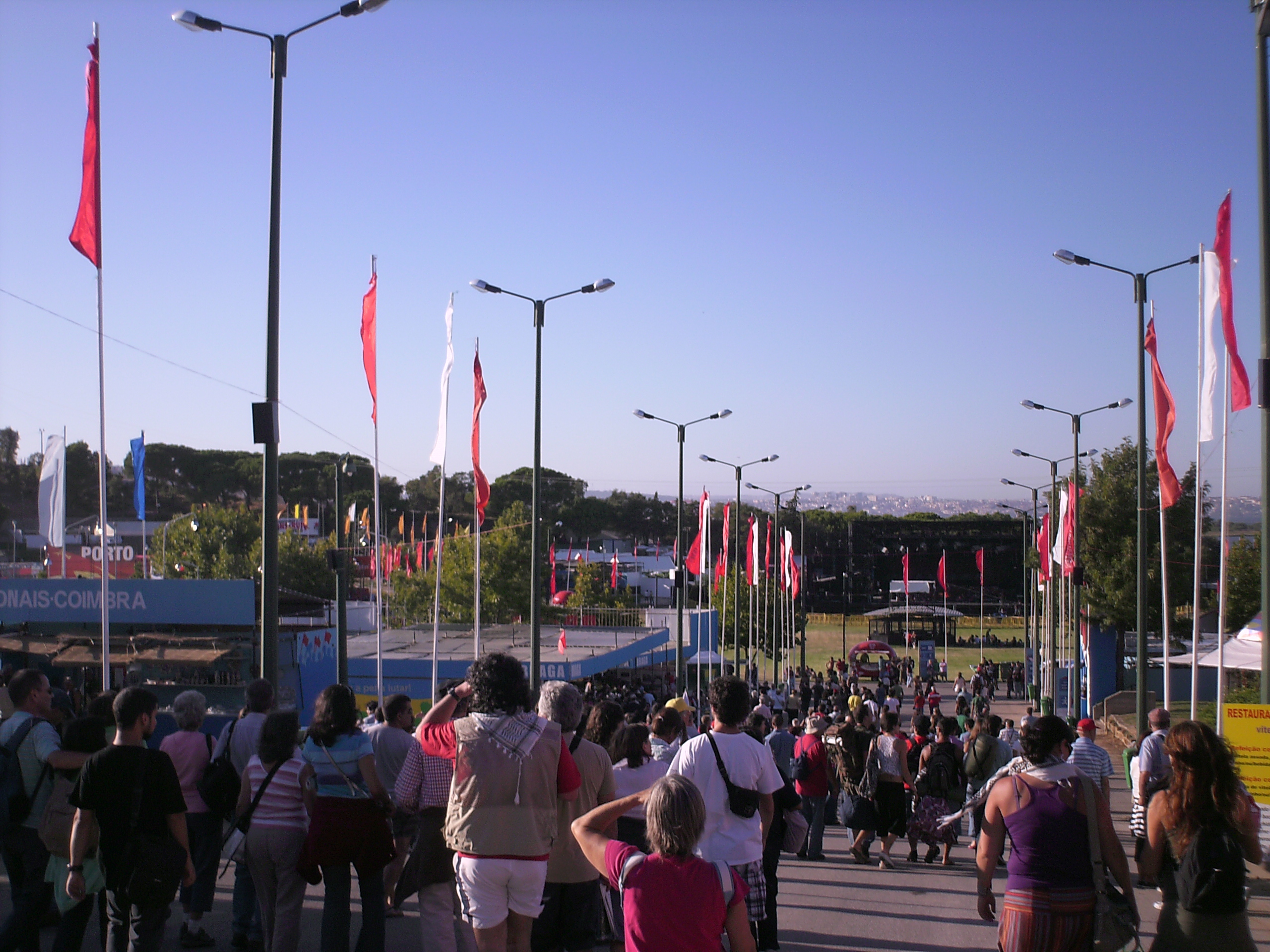
2009 festival

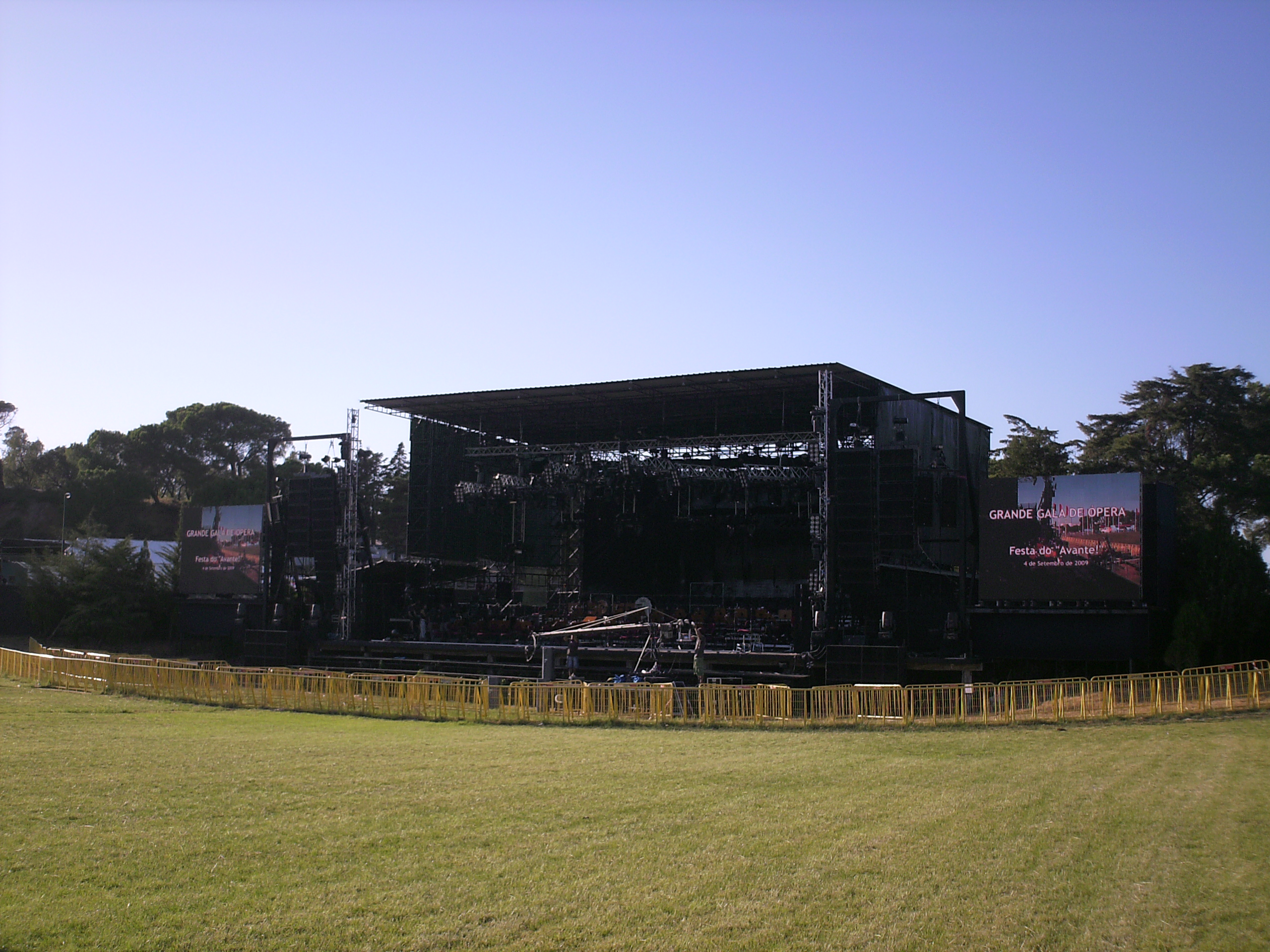
2009 stage

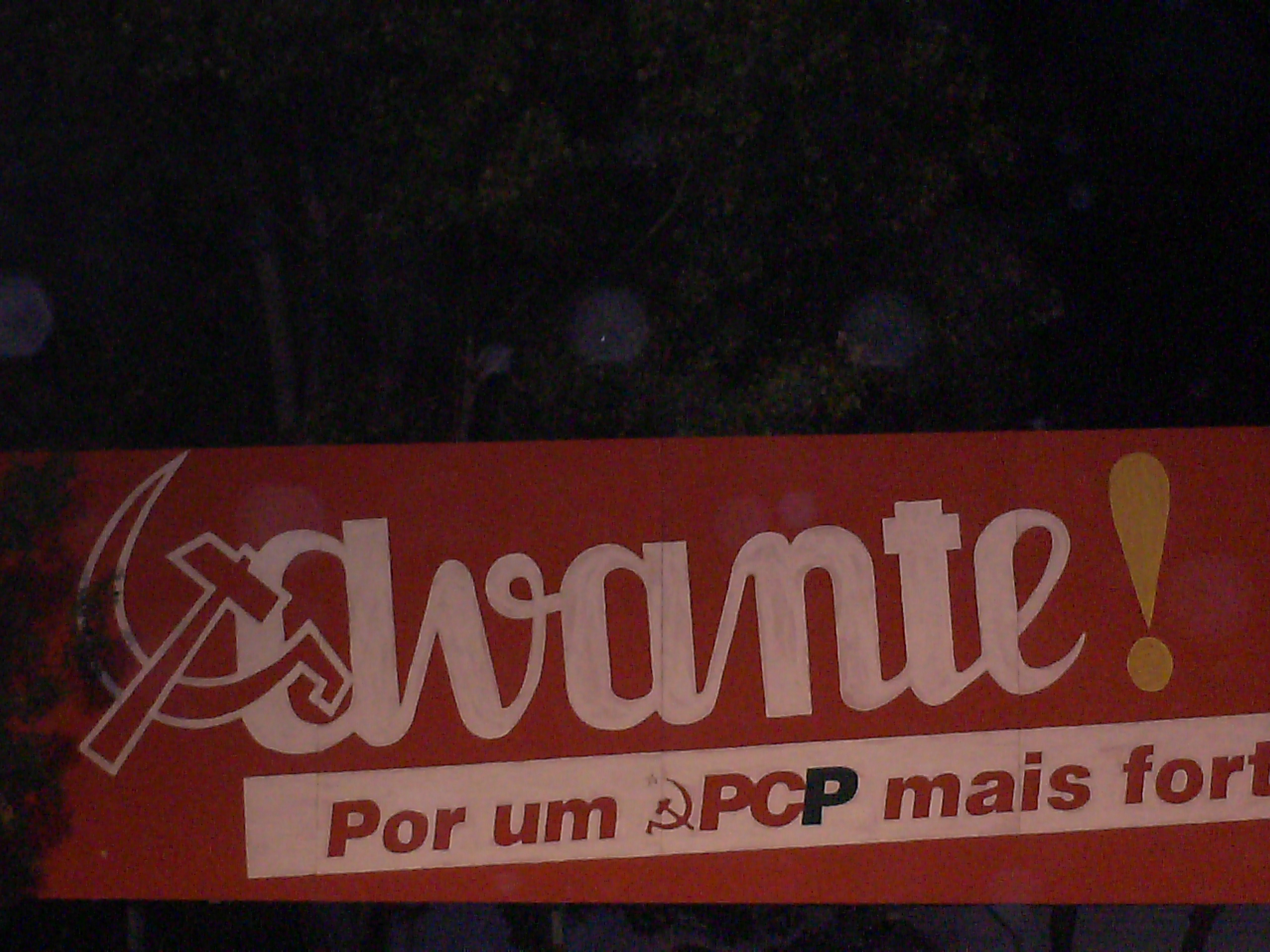
Banner
