= Maria Luísa Costa Dias =

Portuguese communist and anti-government activist

- Born: Maria Luísa Palhinha da Costa Dias; 15 October 1916; Coimbra, Portugal
- Died: 10 May 1975 (aged 58); Vila Franca de Xira, Portugal
- Occupation: Doctor
- Known for: Opposition to Estado Novo government, spending six years in political prisons

Maria Luísa Costa Dias (1916–1975), was a Portuguese medical doctor and communist activist in opposition to the authoritarian Estado Novo government.

Maria Luísa Palhinha da Costa Dias was born in the city of Coimbra, on 15 October 1916, to a wealthy family. She had three brothers, two of whom became owners of a canning company, while the third became an activist, writer and researcher. A graduate in medicine, in the 1930s she joined International Red Aid, a social service organization established by the Communist International. At a young age she also joined the Movement of Democratic Unity (MUD), an organization that opposed the Estado Novo.

In 1947, Costa Dias moved to Mozambique, together with her future husband, Pedro dos Santos Soares, who at that time was a high school teacher. Both returned to Portugal in 1950 and, in 1951, both went into hiding as members of the Portuguese Communist Party. She related her experience in the work Children Emerging from the Shadow. Tales from concealment, a book that was published posthumously in 1982 about the lives of children in hiding and even of some inside Estado Novo prisons who were accompanying their mothers.

On 3 December 1953, Costa Dias was arrested by the PIDE (International and State Defence Police) while staying at a secret location in Palmela. She was taken to Caxias prison. She was released on health grounds on 18 December 1954, leaving the prison by ambulance, after a major campaign at national and international level. She was again arrested, together with her husband, on 5 December 1958, when she was tortured by the PIDE, not being released until 20 April 1962, again after an international campaign of support. On her release she weighed just over 30 kilograms. In total, she spent over six years in the Estado Novo jails and over twenty in hiding. In May 1961 she was the author of one of thirteen letters sent illegally from Caxias prison, and addressed to "women's and democratic organizations all over the world", in which she denounced the torture carried out and the conditions in which women were held. The year after her release she returned to hiding, after having carried out several missions abroad for the Communist Party. While in hiding she translated three books from French into Portuguese. For some years she worked in Algiers for Rádio Voz da Liberdade.

Her husband, Pedro Soares, who held several leadership positions in the Communist Party, was also arrested several times. He was held at Aljube prison in Lisbon, now a Resistance Museum; in Caxias prison, and in Peniche Fortress, being one of nine to escape from Peniche with the Communist Party leader, Álvaro Cunhal, on 3 January 1960. He was twice deported to the Tarrafal camp (also known as the “Camp of the Slow Death") in the Portuguese colony of Cape Verde.

As an activist, Costa Dias participated in several national and international campaigns, including for the release of political prisoners. She worked for the defence of women's rights, having been one of the main promoters of female emancipation in Portugal. During the Carnation Revolution of 25 April 1974, which restored democracy in Portugal, Dias served as a representative of Portuguese women and director of the Pro-Soviet Women's International Democratic Federation. She was also a member of the Movimento Democrático de Mulheres (Women's Democratic Movement) from its inception in 1968, and was a member of the National Executive. In 1974, she stopped practising medicine, to dedicate herself entirely to the activities of the Portuguese Communist Party. Costa Dias collaborated in organizing the visit to Portugal of the first woman astronaut, Valentina Tereshkova in 1975.

Maria Luísa da Costa Dias died in a road accident in the early hours of 10 May 1975, together with her husband. The car in which they were travelling was rammed by another vehicle near Vila Franca de Xira, which left the scene. Their funerals were held together and were addressed by the Communist Party leader, Álvaro Cunhal. A monument to the couple was raised in Trigaches, home town of Soares.
