= Aida Paula =

Portuguese communist and political prisoner

- Born: Aida da Conceição Paula; 9 December 1918; Lisbon, Portugal
- Died: 25 October 1993 (aged 74); Lisbon, Portugal
- Other names: "Marta"
- Known for: Political prisoner during the Portuguese Estado Novo regime

Aida Paula (9 December 1918 – 25 October 1993) was a Portuguese communist who opposed the authoritarian Estado Novo government, was arrested on three occasions, and spent many years as a political prisoner.

== Early life ==
Aida da Conceição Paula was born on 9 December 1918 in the Campo de Ourique area of the Portuguese capital of Lisbon. Her father was Carlos Luís Paula and her mother Luísa da Conceição Paula who, like many in Portugal at that time, was illiterate and only learned to read and write while in hiding, at the age of 46. When Paula was still at primary school, she began to work with a footwear manufacturer, supporting her father, a building painter, and her mother, a weaver. Her difficult early life was aggravated by the deportation of her father to the Portuguese colony of Angola in 1927, for political reasons. Eighteen months later, she and her mother joined him. They would later return to Lisbon, where she joined the Portuguese Communist Party at the age of 18.

== First arrest ==
In February 1939, a few months after her father's death in 1938, Aida Paula went underground. In time, her mother, alone after her husband's death, would join her in hiding as a Communist Party member. Both were arrested in May 1939, when Paula was working in a clandestine printing shop in Algés near Lisbon. They were taken to the Surveillance and State Defence Police (PVDE) headquarters in Lisbon and were then separated. Aida Paula was kept incommunicado in a cell, being questioned by police agents who told her that mother was very sick and suffering and saying that if Paula cooperated with them, they would help her mother. She never spoke.

== Subsequent activities ==
In June 1939, Paula was transferred to an all-women prison at Tires, where she joined her mother, and where they shared a cell, isolated from other prisoners. On October 19, 1940, she was tried by the Special Military Court, sentenced to a year in prison and loss of political rights for five years. Released a few days later, having already been in prison for a year, she resumed her political work and again went underground with her mother, moving to Freixial near Loures, to the north of Lisbon. Here she would come into contact with Álvaro Cunhal, who would become secretary-general of the Portuguese Communist Party between 1961 and 1992. Paula and her mother were the only two women present, albeit as secretaries, at the first Illegal Congress of the Portuguese Communist Party, held in Monte Estoril in 1943. Later, she and her mother would go their separate ways, not seeing each other for seven years. During her time in hiding Paula wrote in communist papers, such as A Voz das Camaradas, with the pseudonym of "Marta", and collaborated in the production of Avante!. She learned French with a comrade and translated articles that were distributed to Communist Party members. She also wrote short stories and training texts.

== Second arrest ==
Paula's second arrest took place in December 1958, almost 20 years after the first. She was held in isolation at Caxias Prison near Lisbon for eight days and was eventually tried in April 1960 for being a member of the Communist Party. She was then sentenced to two and a half years in prison, but this was extended and she ended up spending six consecutive years in prison. She was the author of one of 13 letters in a manifesto addressed to women and democratic organizations all over the world, smuggled out of Caxias prison in May 1961, denouncing the tortures and the conditions in which the political prisoners were kept. She was always fighting against the prison regime and the inhumane conditions, leading to her being punished six times. Punishments included not being able to receive visitors, not being allowed to exercise outdoors, and not being able to receive newspapers and other publications.

== Third arrest ==
On her release Paula came out of hiding to take care of her seriously ill mother. She was arrested again in 1967, when she suffered 18 days in isolation at Campolide police station, followed by sleep deprivation for six days and six nights. Her health deteriorated rapidly until her release in May 1968 when she was acquitted at her trial. She later worked in the office of an anti-colonialist doctor, Julieta Gandra, who she had got to know in Caxias prison when they shared the same cell.

== Death ==
Aida da Conceição Paula died on 25 October 1993.
