= Aida Magro =

Portuguese communist and political prisoner

- Born: Aida de Freitas Loureiro; 4 April 1918; Huíla Province Angola
- Died: 11 November 2011 (Aged 93)
- Other names: Aida de Freitas Loureiro Magro
- Known for: Political prisoner during the Portuguese Estado Novo regime

Aida Magro (1918 – 2011) was a Portuguese communist who was a campaigner against the authoritarian Estado Novo regime. She was held as a political prisoner for six years.

== Early life ==
Aida de Freitas Loureiro Magro was born in Huíla Province in what at the time was the Portuguese colony of Angola on 4 April 1918. She was the daughter of Benvinda Freitas Loureiro and António Pedro Loureiro. She graduated in chemical engineering from the Industrial Institute of Lisbon where she was a participant in various student struggles. She married a distant cousin, José Magro (1920 – 1980), who was a Portuguese Communist Party (PCP) activist.

== Political life ==
Magro joined the PCP in 1942. In 1945, she went underground as a Party official, taking over, among other tasks, the control of the PCP committee for the eastern zone of Lisbon, at the time the most important working area in the city, and contributing to A Voz das Camaradas (The Voices of the Comrades), the magazine for PCP members. Her task in Lisbon represented an unusual level of responsibility for a woman in the PCP of that time. At the end of World War II food was scarce and communists living clandestinely did not have access to rations provided by the state. Her family was dependent on financial support from the PCP and had to buy supplies of basic foodstuffs on the black market. When her daughter was nine months old, she was sent to her grandparents, as having a child was not compatible with working clandestinely. Magro lived in 14 different houses and would not see her daughter for 14 years.

== Arrest ==
Her husband was arrested in January 1951 and released in 1957. Magro was arrested about one month after her husband was freed in 1957. She was held in isolation in Caxias prison near Lisbon for more than six months. She was formally tried in July 1958 and sentenced to two and a half years imprisonment but was, in fact, not released until February 1963. Meanwhile her husband was arrested again in 1959 and also held in Caxias prison, from where he escaped in 1961, being recaptured in 1962. After her release, Magro started to work in support of political prisoners. Despite having engineering qualifications, she found it very difficult to get work because of her communist connections. She ended up doing "a little bit of everything" in order to survive. She had been placed on parole for three years and was not permitted to leave Lisbon. By the time of her release her husband had again been detained. He would not leave prison until the Estado Novo was overthrown by the Carnation Revolution of 25 April 1974.

After the Carnation Revolution, Aida Magro became a PCP official. She joined the regional organization for Lisbon, working in Sintra as well as at the Party's headquarters. She died on 11 November 2011.
