= Julieta Gandra =

Portuguese doctor, supporter of Angolan independence and political prisoner

- Born: Maria Julieta Guimarães Gandra; 16 September 1917; Oliveira de Azeméis, Portugal
- Died: 8 October 2007 (aged 90); Lisbon
- Occupations: Physician and gynaecologist
- Known for: Amnesty International’s “Prisoner of Conscience of the Year”, 1964

Julieta Gandra (1917–2007) was a Portuguese doctor who was imprisoned by the Portuguese authorities for supporting Angolan Independence. She was Amnesty International's "Prisoner of Conscience of the Year" in 1964.

== Early life ==
Maria Julieta Guimarães Gandra was born in Oliveira de Azeméis near Porto in Portugal on 16 September 1917, to Mário Gandra and Aurora Rocha Guimarães Gandra. She was one of four children. She graduated in Medicine from Lisbon. While at university she met Ernesto Cochat Osório, a native of Angola. The couple married, had a son, Miguel, and in the mid-1940s left Portugal for its colony, Angola.

== Angola ==
In Luanda, capital of Angola, Julieta Gandra practiced as a gynaecologist. She had an office in the centre of the city, where she consulted women of the white Portuguese colonial elite, and also attended, for a token fee, Angolan women in a modest office in the poorer areas of the city. Socially, she mixed with many of the Angolan intellectuals who went on to found the People's Movement for the Liberation of Angola (MPLA), such as with Agostinho Neto, Lúcio Lara and Paulo Teixeira Jorge. During the 1958 Portuguese presidential campaign, at a rally in support of the opposition leader Humberto Delgado, she addressed, at the beginning of her speech, the "black mothers".

Accused of conspiring against Portugal's external security, of being a member of the Portuguese Communist Party, of giving money to the MPLA and of having invited an MPLA member to dinner, she was arrested in August 1959 and detained in a psychiatric hospital while awaiting trial. She was tried, together with other defendants, in what was the first political trial of Angolan nationalists and became known as the "Process of the '50s", for having the intention of "separating, by violent or illegal means, the territory of Angola from the Motherland". No evidence was presented and her lawyer was not permitted to leave Lisbon to defend her in Luanda. She was initially sentenced to a year in prison but this was increased to three years after the Government appealed.

While Gandra was in prison, a 6-month pregnant Portuguese woman went to the offices of the PIDE (International and State Defence Police) and demanded that Gandra be allowed to continue to assist her. The authorities eventually permitted this, allowing her to visit the mother's house for the delivery, accompanied by security guards. When word got out that this had happened other women demanded the same support, as Gandra was effectively the only gynaecologist in Angola at that time. She was thus permitted to leave prison on numerous occasions to assist with births.

== Imprisonment in Lisbon ==
Gandra appealed her three-year sentence and was then sent back to Lisbon for the trial, which led to her sentence being increased to four years. She served the sentence in Caxias prison. At this time, she was declared to be the "Prisoner of Conscience of the Year", 1964 by Amnesty International. According to Amnesty International, "it would not be possible to find a better example of a human being who, dedicating herself to peaceful work and never having practised or defended the use of violence, had been subject to the arbitrary brutality of the State for her opinions and convictions". Amnesty International insisted on checking the conditions of her detention and health and put pressure on the Estado Novo government.

== Release and later life ==
With legal support from the future President of Portugal, Mário Soares, she was released in July 1965 and lived in Lisbon, working as a doctor in Rua Manuel da Maia and, for a time, employing Aida Paula, with whom she had shared a cell in Caxias prison. She became a pioneer in the promotion of the oral contraceptive pill in Portugal, arguing that women were entitled to sexual pleasure without being penalised by pregnancy. This led to her being looked upon with renewed suspicion by the authorities. As well, her home soon became a meeting place for anti-colonial activists. It was constantly monitored by the secret police and there is a story that one day Gandra returned home with lots of shopping and persuaded the agent outside her door to carry it up to her fourth floor apartment. From 1970, a communist revolutionary who she had become close to in prison, Fernanda de Paiva Tomás, lived with her.

After the Carnation Revolution of 25 April 1974 that overthrew the Estado Novo regime, Gandra's home was the location of the first meeting to plan the first anti-colonial demonstration in Lisbon. She was also present at the signing of the Alvor Agreement that granted Angola independence from Portugal. After that, she returned to Angola, accompanied by Fernanda Tomás, to prepare for the National Health Service of an independent Angola. However, a decline in her health, caused by a pulmonary edema, forced her to return to Portugal, in 1977.

Julieta Gandra died on 8 October 2007, at the age of 90.
