= O Militante =

O Militante (The Militant) is a magazine of theoretical discussion, founded in 1932 and published by the Portuguese Communist Party. O Militante forms, along with the weekly Avante!, the essential core of the Party's press, but, unlike Avante!, O Militante is only sold in the party's offices or to subscribers.

The magazine is published every two months, six times a year, and is now (as of 2005) in its fourth series, a series that started in 1975, after the Carnation Revolution.

The articles featured in the magazine are usually related to the state of the Party's organization and work priorities. It also analyzes the national and international political situation and historical events. Usually it also includes the Party's official information, such as reports from the Central Committee.
