= Alhandra, São João dos Montes e Calhandriz =

- Civil parish
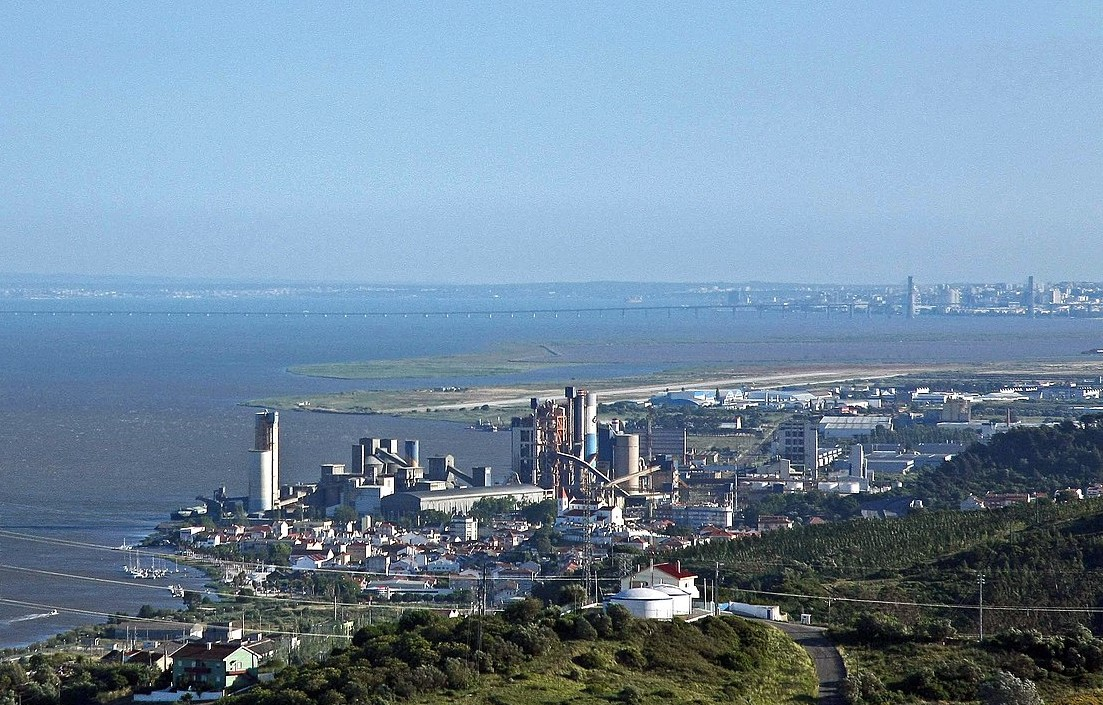

- Location in Portugal
- Coordinates: 38.927°N 9.009°W
- Country: Portugal
- Region: Lisbon
- Metropolitan area: Lisbon
- District: Lisbon
- Municipality: Vila Franca de Xira

Area
  - Total: 27.54 km^{2} (10.63 sq mi)

Population (2011)
  - Total: 12,866
  - Density: 467.2/km^{2} (1,210/sq mi)
- Time zone: UTC+00:00 (WET)
  - Summer (DST): UTC+01:00 (WEST)

Alhandra, São João dos Montes e Calhandriz is a civil parish in the municipality of Vila Franca de Xira, Portugal. It was formed in 2013 by the merger of the former parishes Alhandra, São João dos Montes and Calhandriz. The population in 2011 was 12,866, in an area of 27.54 km^{2}.

Famous Portuguese explorer Afonso de Albuquerque was born in Alhandra.
