= Rádio Voz da Liberdade =

Radio station run from Algiers by opponents of the Portuguese Estado Novo government

Rádio Voz da Liberdade (Radio Voice of Liberty) was a radio station in Portuguese, organised by the Frente Patriótica de Libertação Nacional (Patriotic Front for National Liberation). It broadcast from Algiers between 1963 and 1974, during the time of the Estado Novo dictatorship in Portugal.

== History ==
Rádio Voz da Liberdade broadcast three times a week. Its programmes were directed to Portugal and to its African colonies. It was organized by the Frente Patriótica de Libertação Nacional, which consisted of various anti-government groups, including the Portuguese Communist Party (PCP). Unlike the PCP's Rádio Portugal Livre, which operated clandestinely, Rádio Voz da Liberdade openly used the facilities of Rádio Algiers.

The Portuguese poet and future presidential candidate, Manuel Alegre, was the director of the station for about ten years during his exile in Algeria. Others to work on the station included Stella Piteira Santos, who was the first female voice on the station, and Maria Luísa Costa Dias. Piteira Santos always greeted listeners with the same introduction: "Friends, comrades and comrades, this is Radio Voz da Liberdade, on behalf of the Patriotic Front for National Liberation".

The station functioned between 1963 and 1974, when the Estado Novo was overthrown on 25 April by the Carnation Revolution. Transmitting to Portugal on medium wave, the station was best received in the southern part of the country. It broadcast the first interview aimed at Portugal by the anti-colonial leader, Amílcar Cabral. Others leading the fight against Portugal as a colonial power who were interviewed included Agostinho Neto from Angola, and Samora Machel and Eduardo Mondlane from Mozambique. It also reported on anti-government activities within Portugal. Often the reports came one month after the event but this was not considered a problem as censorship in Portugal meant that the information had not previously been known.
