= Movimento Democrático de Mulheres =

Women's organization in Portugal

Women's Democratic Movement
- Movimento Democrático de Mulheres
- Abbreviation: MDM
- Predecessor: Liga das Mulheres Republicanas; Conselho Nacional das Mulheres Portuguesas; Associação Feminina Portuguesa para a Paz
- Formation: 1968; 58 years ago
- Founded at: Portugal
- Type: NGO
- Purpose: Women's rights
- Website: www.mdm.org.pt

The Movimento Democrático de Mulheres (Women's Democratic Movement - MDM) is a Portuguese non-governmental women's association. It was created in 1968 by groups opposed to the Estado Novo regime and continued after the overthrow of the regime in 1974.

== Origins ==
The Movimento Democrático de Mulheres (MDM) had its roots in earlier women's movements in Portugal, such as the Liga das Mulheres Republicanas (League of Republican Women), which operated from 1909 to 1919, the Conselho Nacional das Mulheres Portuguesas (National Council of Portuguese Women - CNMP), which functioned from 1914 to its closure by the Estado Novo in 1947, and the Associação Feminina Portuguesa para a Paz (Portuguese Women's Association for Peace - AFPP), which was disbanded by the regime in 1952.

== Establishment ==
The MDM was created at a time of the flourishing of radical movements worldwide, including the opposition to the Vietnam War in the United States and the May 68 anti-government protests in Paris. It was initially started as women's electoral committees, which were set up to campaign in the 1969 Portuguese legislative election. This, like all elections under the Estado Novo, was fraudulent, with the government winning all of the seats in the National Assembly. After the elections, those involved in the anti-government movement agreed to continue working together to campaign for "better wages, better living conditions and equal rights" as well as to oppose the Portuguese Colonial War, government censorship and arbitrary arrests by the political police. Some of those involved were Maria Lamas, Francine Benoît, Maria Isabel Aboim Inglez, Manuela Porto, and Maria Alda Nogueira.

== First activities ==
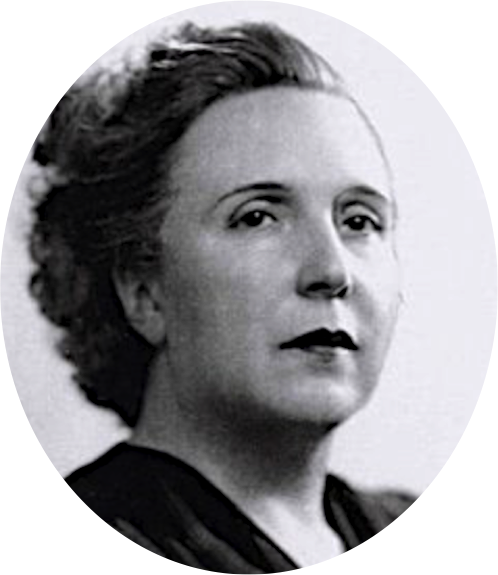
Maria Lamas (pictured in 1939) was the driving force behind the MDM, and later its honorary president

The MDM held its 1st National Meeting on 21 October 1973, in Almada, attended by 250 women from most areas of Portugal. This Congress approved a set of demands, including the release of women from political prisons, an end to discrimination against women at work, and the introduction of painless childbirth and the right to abortion to preserve women's health. This was a semi-clandestine gathering. Two days after the 25 April 1974 Carnation Revolution, which overthrew the Estado Novo, the MDM delivered these demands to the National Salvation Junta, which had taken over government. After the 1974 revolution, MDM members started to visit factories to listen to the concerns of women. The lack of maternity leave and maternity pay emerged as important issues, together with the differences in pay levels between women and men.

The 2nd National Meeting was held on 12 October 1975, when the MDM's statutes were approved. Maria Lamas, who had been President of the CNMP when it was disbanded in 1947, and was the driving force behind the MDM, was unanimously made its honorary president. At this meeting there were concerns expressed that the new Constituent Assembly, formed to develop a new Constitution for the country, was not addressing women's issues. A letter was sent to the president of the Constituent Assembly protesting that "until now, in the Constituent Assembly, no measure referring to equal rights between women and men has been approved for inclusion in the text of the future Constitution". The third National Meeting attracted 2000 participants and agreed a Charter of Women's Rights. Following this, MDM gatherings became known as “Congresses”, at which the governing bodies were elected. The first was held in Lisbon in 1980 and they have been held every four years since. At the 3rd Congress emphasis was placed on the status of women's associations and other organizations. Over the years MDM has expanded relations with similar organizations in other countries.

== Aims and campaigns ==
The MDM is a member of the Advisory Board of Portugal's Commission for Equality and Women's Rights and is a member of the Women's International Democratic Federation (WIDF). Its activities now address such issues as women's health, work, family life, local governance, domestic violence, dating violence, trafficking in women and men, Roma women, and protecting a woman's right to abortion. The organization's website describes its aims as:

- Uniting women in defending their rights and interests as citizens, workers and mothers;
- Striving for equal opportunities between men and women, denouncing and fighting against all forms of political, social and economic discrimination on grounds of sex, disability, ethnicity, religion or belief, and sexual orientation;
- Fighting for the right to work and against wage discrimination, for the creation of effective conditions that allow the realization of a quality life;
- Denouncing and fighting against all forms of violence that affect women and hurt their dignity;
- Defending the sexual and reproductive rights of women, also striving for the recognition, in practice, of the social function of maternity / paternity;
- Establishing relationships of friendship, solidarity and cooperation with women's and feminist organizations that, all over the world, fight for the defence of women's rights and for the de facto recognition of their dignity, as well as for a future of peace, justice and happiness for humanity.
