= Maria Eugénia Varela Gomes =

Anti-government campaigner and political prisoner in Portugal

- Born: Maria Eugénia de Bilnstein Sequeira; 18 December 1925; Évora, Portugal
- Died: 27 November 2016 (aged 90); Lisbon
- Occupation: Social worker
- Known for: Opposition to authoritarian Estado Novo Government; Political prisoner

Maria Eugénia Varela Gomes (1925-2016) was a campaigner against the authoritarian Estado Novo government in Portugal in the 20th century. She was twice held in prison. Her work with the poor and to assist political prisoners led to her becoming known as “mother courage”.

== Early life ==
She was born as Maria Eugénia de Bilnstein Sequeira in Évora, Portugal on 18 December 1925. Her father and grandfather were soldiers, her grandfather being a General. She had six brothers. When she was four, the family moved to Cascais, living in the house that subsequently became the Cascais Municipal Library. After completing school, she enrolled in a technical college in 1940 but only stayed there for six months. In 1942 she entered Portugal's Social Services Institute and received lessons from Father Abel Varzim who contributed significantly to the development of her political ideas. He had started out as a supporter of the dictatorship and was elected to the National Assembly, but later became increasingly uncomfortable due to his commitment to combating poverty. She took his side, unsuccessfully, when the Portuguese dictator, António de Oliveira Salazar wanted to remove him from his position in the institute. Her initial work experience as a social worker included a posting at a cork factory in Seixal and in the Bairro da Boavista, a newly constructed area of Lisbon populated mainly by the very poor.

Maria Varela Gomes married Captain (later Colonel) João Varela Gomes in 1951 and they had four children, two girls and two boys. He was also very active in the opposition to the dictatorship. In 1956 she was appointed as Head of Social Services at Santa Maria hospital in Lisbon, now the city's largest hospital, but was forced to leave after two years because of her political stance against the Estado Novo. She campaigned actively for the candidature of Humberto Delgado in the 1958 Presidential elections. In March 1959 she was involved with the failed coup, known as the Revolta da Sé, which was frustrated by the Portuguese secret police, the PIDE. She was investigated but not arrested and subsequently closely monitored the trial and imprisonment of some of those involved.

== Arrest ==
On New Year's Eve 1961 about 20 soldiers and civilians stormed the army barracks at Beja in an attack supported by Humberto Delgado. The attack was repelled and Delgado went into exile. Among the attackers injured was Varela Gomes’ husband. A few days later she was arrested by the PIDE, not knowing at the time whether her husband was alive, and held in prison in isolation until the middle of April 1962. For some of the time she was subjected to sleep deprivation as a form of torture. Interviewed later in her life she stated that she managed to stick to her determination to deny knowledge of the planned assault in Beja while at the same time indicating her full support for the overthrow of the Estado Novo. She repeated over and over again, “I did not participate in either the preparation or the assault on the Beja Barracks, but I am heart and soul with my husband and his companions”. For most of her imprisonment she was held in Caxias prison, together with many well-known members of the Portuguese communist party. However, she never, herself, joined any political party. She was released from prison in 1964 after eighteen months but, following a trial in 1964, her husband was sentenced to six years. After being released she joined the Patriotic Front for National Liberation, working with the future President of Portugal Jorge Sampaio.

== Later activities ==
In 1967 Varela Gomes visited London for contacts with the exiled Frente Portuguesa de Libertação Nacional (FPLN – Portuguese Front for National Liberation), which had been set up by Delgado. The following year she worked at the Seara Nova magazine, being unable to take up a Government job. She also went to Paris for an FPLN meeting attended by Jorge Sampaio, Álvaro Cunhal, Virgínia Moura, and others. In 1969 she was a co-founder of the National Commission for Relief for Political Prisoners (Conselho Nacional de Socorro aos Presos Políticos - CNSPP). In 1970 she was again arrested; this time only for a week. In 1973 during the campaign for the National Assembly election she was brutally beaten by the police in front of her younger daughter. Following the Carnation Revolution, which deposed the Estado Novo on 25 April 1974, she worked with lawyers and the CNSPP to secure the immediate release of all political prisoners. As a result of the overthrow of the Estado Novo she was offered compensation for the jobs she lost because of her political beliefs. Despite being poor, she refused.

== Angola and Mozambique ==
Following the failed Coup of 25 November 1975 (usually referred to as the 25 de Novembro in Portugal), which was an attempt by Portuguese left-wing activists to replace the Portuguese transition to democracy in favour of Communism, Varela Gomes left for Angola, to join her husband who had sought asylum there following the issue of a warrant for his arrest. After a coup in Angola in 1976 the couple moved to Mozambique. They returned to Portugal in 1979 as a result of an amnesty for her husband.

Varela Gomes died on 27 November 2016 at the age of 90. She was survived by her husband and their two daughters, the sons both having pre-deceased her.
