= Avante! =

Portuguese weekly newspaper

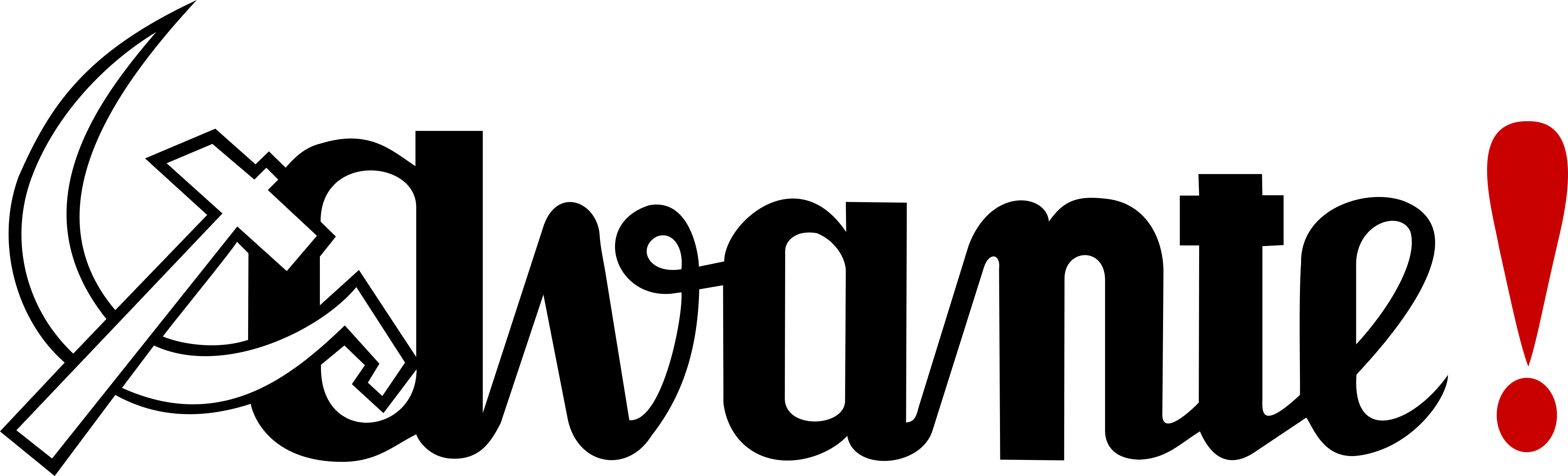

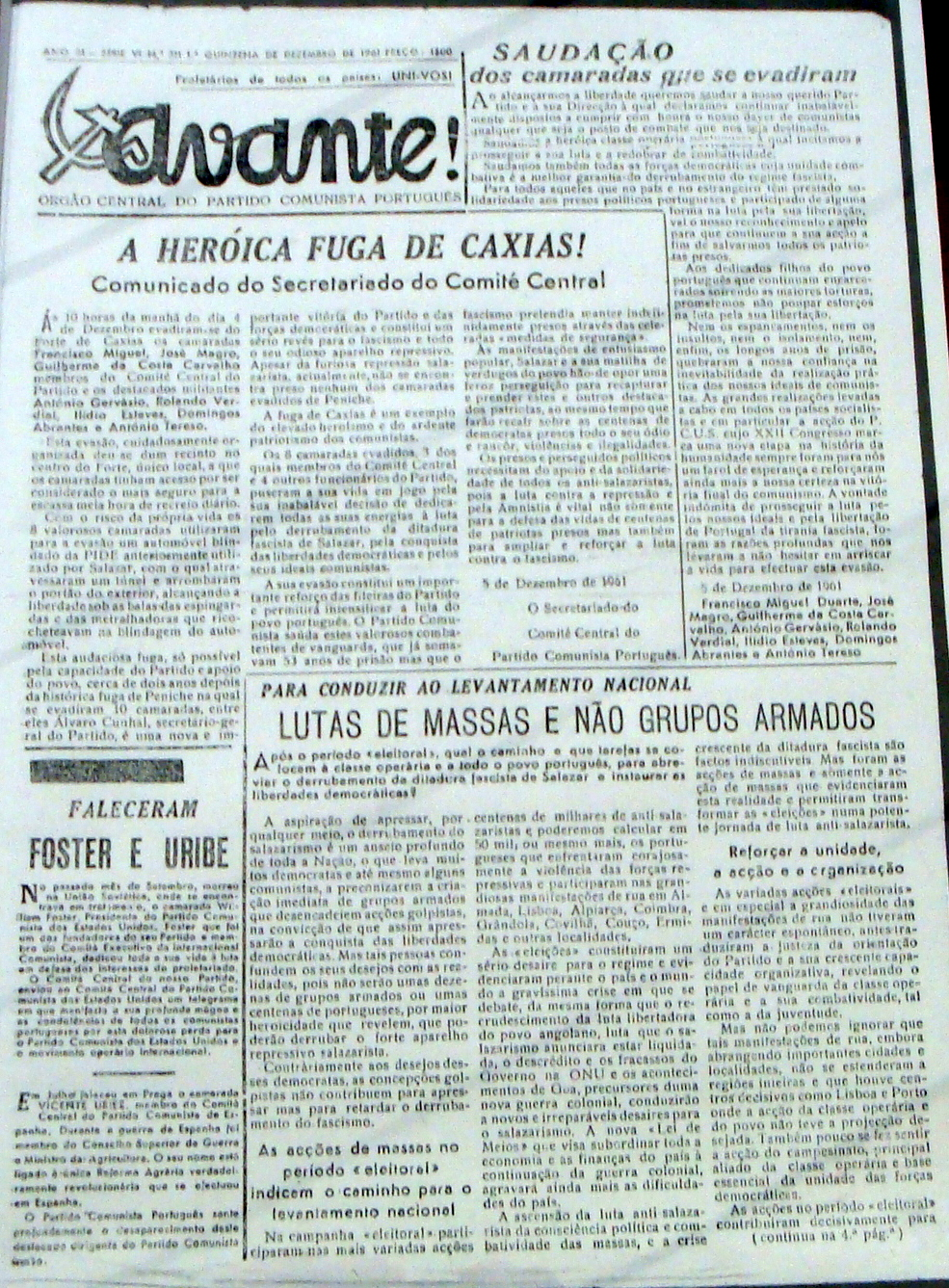
- Cover of the December 1961 issue of Avante!.
- Format: Tabloid
- Owner: Portuguese Communist Party
- Founded: 1931; 95 years ago
- Political alignment: Marxism–Leninism
- Headquarters: Lisbon
- Website: www.avante.pt

Avante! (Onwards!) is the official newspaper of the Portuguese Communist Party (PCP). Founded in 1931, it continues to be published to this day. The newspaper's motto is Workers of the World, Unite! and has been present in every edition of the newspaper since the very first. Its headquarters is in Lisbon.

The newspaper started to be an irregular publication due to the constant repression against the Portuguese Communist Party led by the authorities during the Estado Novo regime, who consistently assaulted the clandestine printing offices. After a major reorganization in 1940, the party was able to make Avante! a better distributed newspaper among the working class, reporting events such as World War II or the Portuguese Colonial War without censorship. After the Carnation Revolution, Avante! had a major role among the working class, supporting the revolutionary changes. After those years, the paper lost influence, but has still a major influence among the workers, mainly in Lisbon, Setúbal and Alentejo.

The newspaper also lends its name to a famous festival organized by the PCP, the Avante! Festival. The festival usually boasts participation from hundreds of thousands of visitors, making the outside of the grounds seem like a giant camping park. The events themselves consist of a three-day festival of music, with hundreds of Portuguese and international bands and artists across five different stages, ethnography, gastronomy, debates, a book & music fair, theatre and sporting events.

== The History ==
=== The early years ===
Avante! was first published 15 February 1931, as an appeal to the Portuguese proletariat, asking it to join the Communist Party's ranks. Despite this, it only started to be a regularly published newspaper in 1941 due to the constant and brutal repression against the PCP led by the Ditadura Nacional authorities, who consistently assaulted the clandestine printing offices as well as the regular persecution, arrest and torture actions against the members of the Communist Party, some of whom were responsible for the newspaper.

=== The 1940s and the 1950s ===
After August 1941, with the deep reorganization of the Communist Party, the newspaper started to be published at least once per month and, with the new party structure, including working from more remote locations, members responsible for the newspaper could now avoid the persecutions with much more efficiency. During the early 1940s, Avante! avoided official censorship, and thus became one of the very few (if not the only) Portuguese media to freely report the events of World War II, denouncing the Nazi atrocities and reporting the role of the Allies, particularly the Soviets, in the war.

In the early 1950s, the Fascist repression against the communists grew again. Protected by the new western allies of NATO, Salazar was able to keep the dictatorship without major problems, and several Communist Party members were imprisoned. Among those was Álvaro Cunhal, who was judged in a show trial in which he denounced the Fascist crimes. In 1958 the Regime was shaken, with popular support shifting to Humberto Delgado, who seemed slated to win the presidential election, but did not, due to extreme manipulations carried out by the Fascist government. The Communist Party was among Delgado's supporters and Avante! had documented some of his democratic actions.

=== The 1960s ===
In 1961 the Colonial War in Africa started, first in Angola, then spreading to Mozambique and Portuguese Guinea. Avante! was one of the few newspapers to give voice to the anti-colonialist feelings of a large part of the Portuguese society who were noticing the military and political developments in the colonies. Avante! also documented several of the protests and demonstrations against the Estado Novo regime, among these, the Academic Crisis, a period of upheaval, led by students in support of Democracy. By the end of the 1960s, thousands of Portuguese citizens had been imprisoned for resisting the dictatorship, and Avante! regularly expressed the PCP's solidarity for them.

=== The 1970s ===
In 1974, after 48 years of dictatorship, the Portuguese people became free, after the Carnation Revolution. A completely new era of Portuguese history began: freedom of speech was finally restored and, under the new Democratic regime, the first legal edition of Avante! could be published. 17 May of that year, the historical first legal issue of Avante! brought attention to the presence of Communists in the 1st provisional government. This edition brought an end to 43 years of illegal publishing and distribution of the newspaper—a world record. During the revolutionary period, up to 500,000 copies of some issues of Avante! were published and distributed. Due to its pro-working-class point of view, particularly in its reporting of protests and resistance movements, Avante! became one of the most popular newspapers among Portuguese workers.

In 1976, the first Avante! Festival was carried out in the FIL park in Lisbon, the first year of the now-annual festival which features among the biggest cultural and political events in the country.

=== Since the 1980s ===
In the early 1980s, other parties started winning in the parliamentary elections for the first time since the Revolution and the resulting government started to dismantle several of the socialist disastrous policies. The Communist Party was strongly against such politics and Avante! took action, denouncing what the PCP considered to be political regression and attacks to the Portuguese working class. Several strikes and protests were organized, with the support and help of Avante!.

After the collapse of the Socialist Bloc of Eastern Europe, the PCP's influence was reduced, but the party's presence in Portuguese society continued to be strong, particularly in the areas around Lisbon and in the south of the country. Several governments passed through power, and Avante! continued to be published, reporting the PCP's objections to right-wing politics.

In the 2000s, several graphic changes were carried out; the front page is now printed in colour and the newspaper has a much more friendly appearance. The PCP created an online edition of Avante!, that features all of the newspaper's content. After seventy years, the PCP's official position on political issues, along with several articles on political and historical issues, continue to be published every Thursday in Avante!.

== Sections ==
- The Front Page
- Editorial
- Opinion Columns
- In Focus
- Obituary of PCP members
- Articles
  - PCP related articles
  - Workers related articles
  - Portuguese Parliament related articles
  - Youth related articles
- News
  - National News
  - European News
  - International News
- Special Articles
- Cartoon

== Historical list of executive editors ==
- Dias Lourenço
- José Casanova (present)

== Avante! Festival ==
Every year (since 1976), during the first weekend of September, the Avante! Festival (Portuguese: Festa do Avante!) takes place. After rotating through different locations around Lisbon, including the FIL Park, Ajuda or Loures, the festival now has a home in Amora, a town near Seixal, on grounds bought by the Communist Party after a massive fundraising campaign in the early 1990s. The campaign was considered by the PCP as the only way to avoid the boycott organised by the owners of the previous festival grounds, which resulted, in 1987, with the festival not being carried out in its 11th year.

The festival usually boasts participation from hundreds of thousands of visitors, making the outside of the grounds seem like a giant camping park. The events themselves consist of a three-day festival of music, with hundreds of Portuguese and international bands and artists across five different stages, ethnography, gastronomy, debates, a book & music fair, theatre (Avanteatro) and sporting events. Several foreign communist parties also participate.

In 28 editions, the Festival counted with the presence of several famous artists, either Portuguese or foreign, like Chico Buarque, Baden Powell, Ivan Lins, Zeca Afonso, Buffy Sainte-Marie, Holly Near, Johnny Clegg, Charlie Haden, Judy Collins, Richie Havens, Tom Paxton, The Soviet Circus Company, the Kuban Cossacks Choir, Dexys Midnight Runners, The Band, Hevia, Adriano Correia de Oliveira, Carlos Paredes, Jorge Palma, Manoel de Oliveira and many others.

== See also ==
- List of newspapers in Portugal
- Observador
- Portuguese Communist Party
