= Beja Municipal Chamber =

Legislative body of Beja

Coordinates: 38.01586°N 7.86511°W

Beja Municipal Chamber Câmara Municipal de Beja
- Coat of arms of the city of Beja

Type
- Type: Câmara municipal
- Term limits: 3

History
- Founded: 1524; 501 years ago

Leadership
- President: Nuno Palma Ferro, PSD since 31 October 2025
- Vice President: Liliana Cabecinha, PSD since 31 October 2025

Structure
- Seats: 7
- Political groups: Municipal Executive (4) PSD (2) PCP(2) Opposition (3) PS (2) CH (1)
- Length of term: Four years

Elections
- Last election: 12 October 2025
- Next election: Sometime between 22 September and 14 October 2029

Meeting place
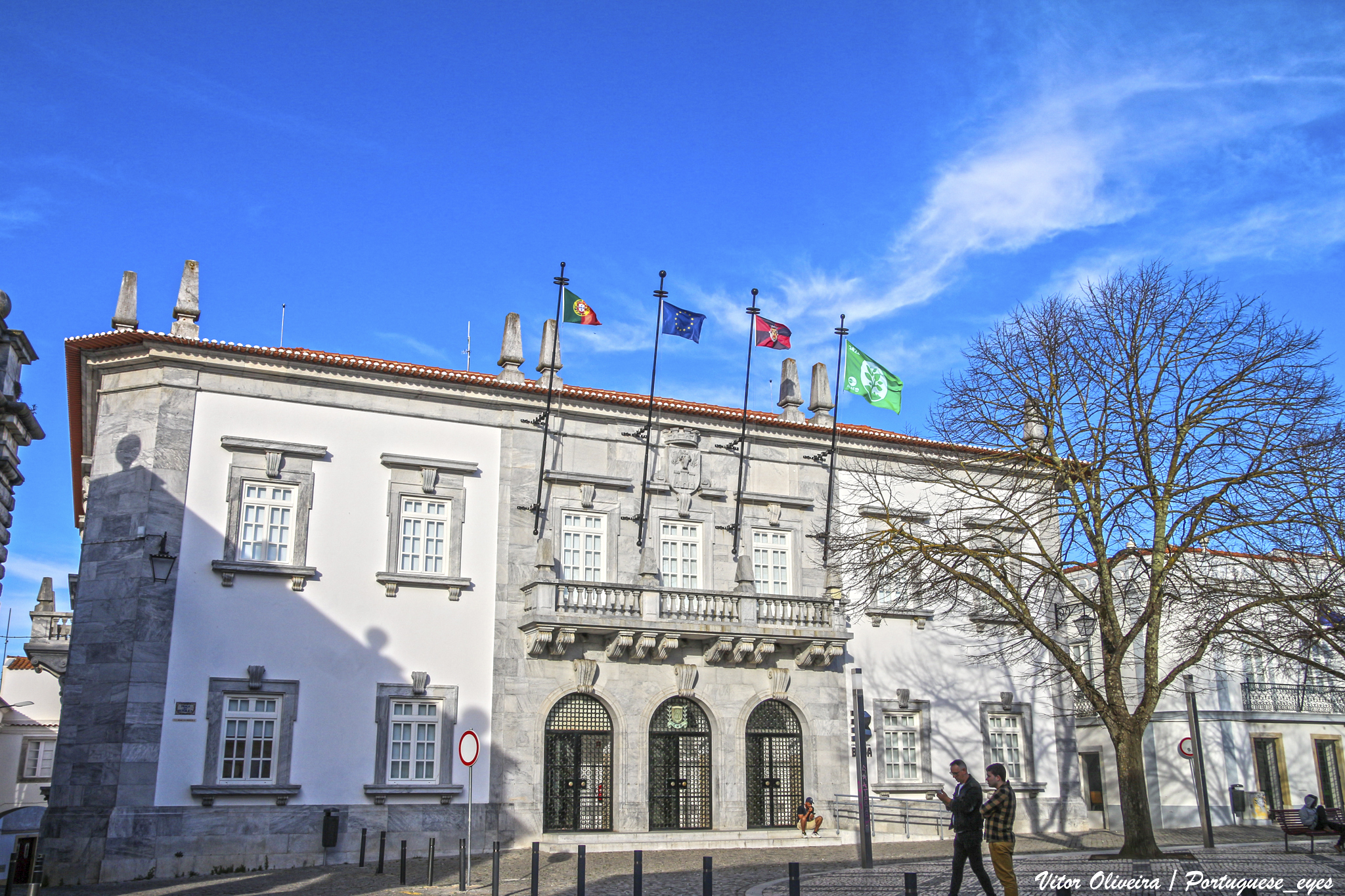
- Paços do Concelho de Beja

Website
- cm-beja.pt/pt/Default.aspx

The Beja Municipal Chamber (Portuguese: Câmara Municipal de Beja) is the administrative authority in the municipality of Beja. It has 12 freguesias in its area of jurisdiction and is based in the city of Beja, on the Beja District. These freguesias are: Albernoa e Trindade, Baleizão, Beja (Salvador e Santa Maria da Feira), Beja (Santiago Maior e São João Baptista), Beringel, Cabeça Gorda, Nossa Senhora das Neves, Salvada e Quintos, Santa Clara de Louredo, Santa Vitória e Mombeja, São Matias and Trigaches e São Brissos.

The Beja City Council is made up of 7 councillors, representing, currently, three different political forces. The first candidate on the list with the most votes in a municipal election or, in the event of a vacancy, the next candidate on the list, takes office as President of the Municipal Chamber.

== List of the Presidents of the Municipal Chamber of Beja ==
- Anselmo de Andrade – (18??–18??)
- Fernando Nunes Ribeiro – (19??–19??)
- José Reis Colaço – (1974–1982)
- José Carreira Marques – (1982–2005)
- Francisco Cruz Santos – (2005–2009)
- Jorge Pulido Valente – (2009–2013)
- João Manuel Rocha da Silva – (2013–2017)
- Paulo Arsénio – (2017–2025)
- Nuno Palma Ferro – (2025–...)

(The list is incomplete)
