= São Matias =

São Matias may refer to:

- São Matias, Goa, a village on Divar island, Tiswadi, in the Indian state of Goa
- São Matias (Beja), a parish of Beja Municipality, in southeast Portugal
