= Maria Lucília Estanco Louro =

Portuguese educator and opponent of the Estado Novo regime

- Born: 27 January 1922; Beja, Portugal
- Died: 27 December 2018 (Aged 96); Lisbon, Portugal
- Occupation: Teacher

Maria Lucília Estanco Louro (1922–2018) was a Portuguese pacifist and opponent of the authoritarian Estado Novo regime, who became known as a teacher and political activist.

== Early life ==
Maria Lucília Estanco Louro was born in Beja, Portugal on 27 January 1922, daughter of Albertina Emília Freire and Manuel Francisco Estanco Louro. She graduated in Historical-Philosophical Sciences from the Faculty of Letters of the University of Lisbon in 1944. Her thesis, entitled "Paul Gauguin seen in the light of Characterology - Life and Work", sparked controversy as she was the first in the Faculty to write about Art, then considered then a poor relative of History.

== Portuguese women’s peace association ==
Between 1940 and 1944 Louro was a member of the board of the Associação Feminina Portuguesa para la Paz (Portuguese women's peace association - AFPP) and its Secretary for three of those years. With Cândida Ventura, a colleague from the Faculty of Arts of Lisbon, she collaborated in the mobilization of artists, writers, actors and poets to contribute to the work of the AFPP. She was part of a group that organized small packages with cigarettes and food that were sent to prisoners of war, in collaboration with Socorro Vermelho Internacional (International Red Aid), an aid organization established by the Communist International.

== Teaching ==
Obtaining teaching qualifications in 1948 Louro taught at high schools in Faro, Beja, Évora, Oeiras and Lisbon. She made major contributions to the teacher movement that was trying to reform the outdated teaching methods supported by the Estado Novo. Many of these discussions were, of necessity, held clandestinely. After the April 25, 1974 Carnation Revolution that overthrew the Estado Novo, Louro joined with many other teachers to propose revisions to the teaching curriculum. Targeted at children in their 6th and 7th years at school, the teaching material was initially supported by the Ministry of Education. However, some of the teachers' ideas were deemed too revolutionary and were not published.

== Later life ==
Although sympathetic to the communist cause from the 1940s, she did not join the Portuguese Communist Party until the 1970s. She also then became a member of the Portuguese Council for Peace and Cooperation (CPCC). In the 1990s, she offered the Neo-realism Museum in Vila Franca de Xira a small collection (brochures, programs, etc.) on the organization of the AFPP. On her 90th birthday, Louro was honoured by Portugal's Não Apaguem a Memória movement (Don't erase the memory - NAM), which works to ensure that the events of the struggle against the Estado Novo are remembered. She died on 27 December 2018.
