= Convent of Beja =

Museum in Beja, Portugal

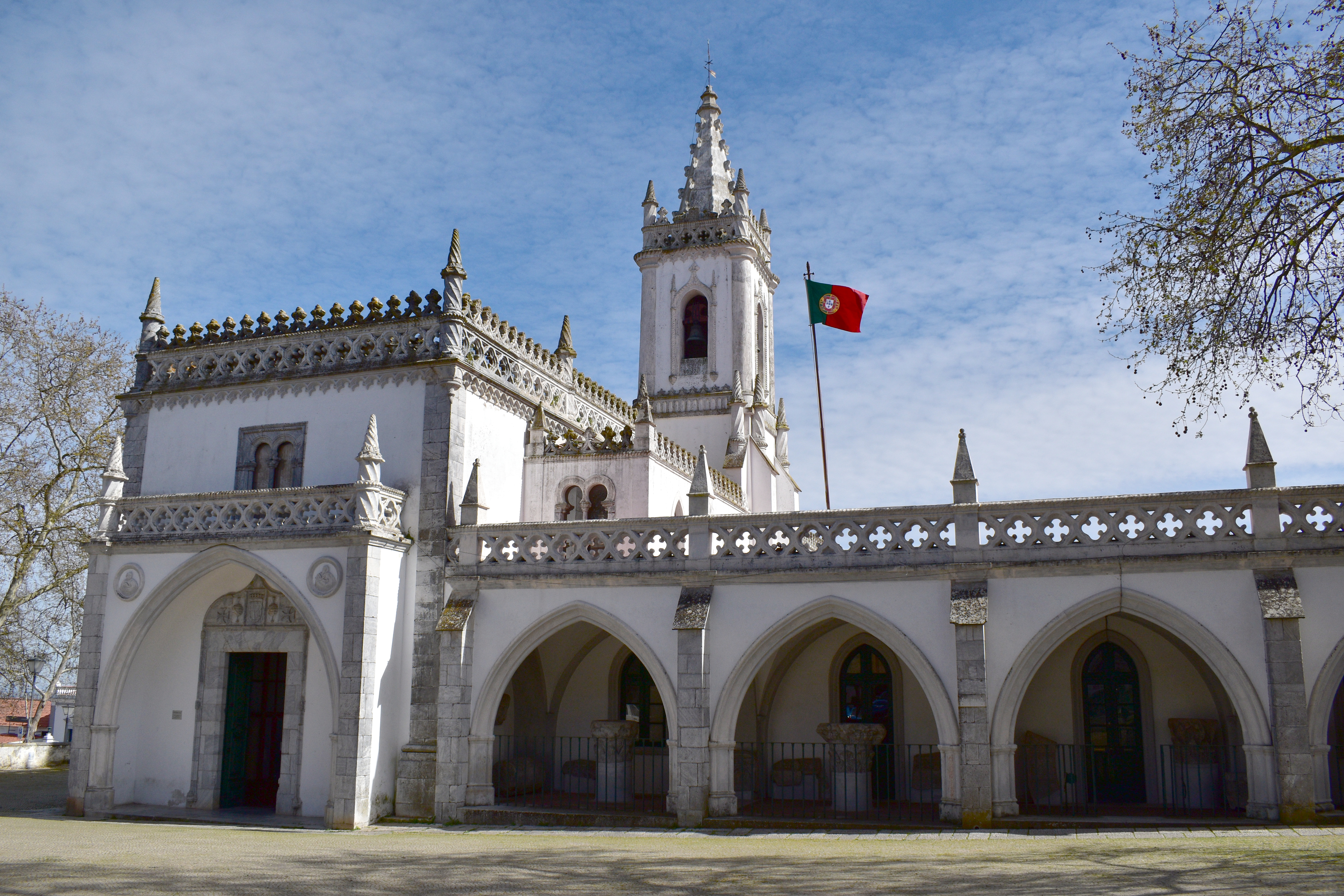
Museu Rainha Dona Leonor

Museu Rainha Dona Leonor ("Queen Eleanor Museum") is a museum housed in the former Convent of Beja, Portugal.

== Convent ==
The convent was founded in 1495. The convent of Nossa Senhora da Conceição, a congregation of Poor Clares in Beja, was the setting for the romance between nun Mariana Alcoforado and a French officer, as retold in Mariana (1997) and other novels.

It serves now as the Beja Regional Museum.
