= Gonçalo Mendes da Maia =

Portuguese knight

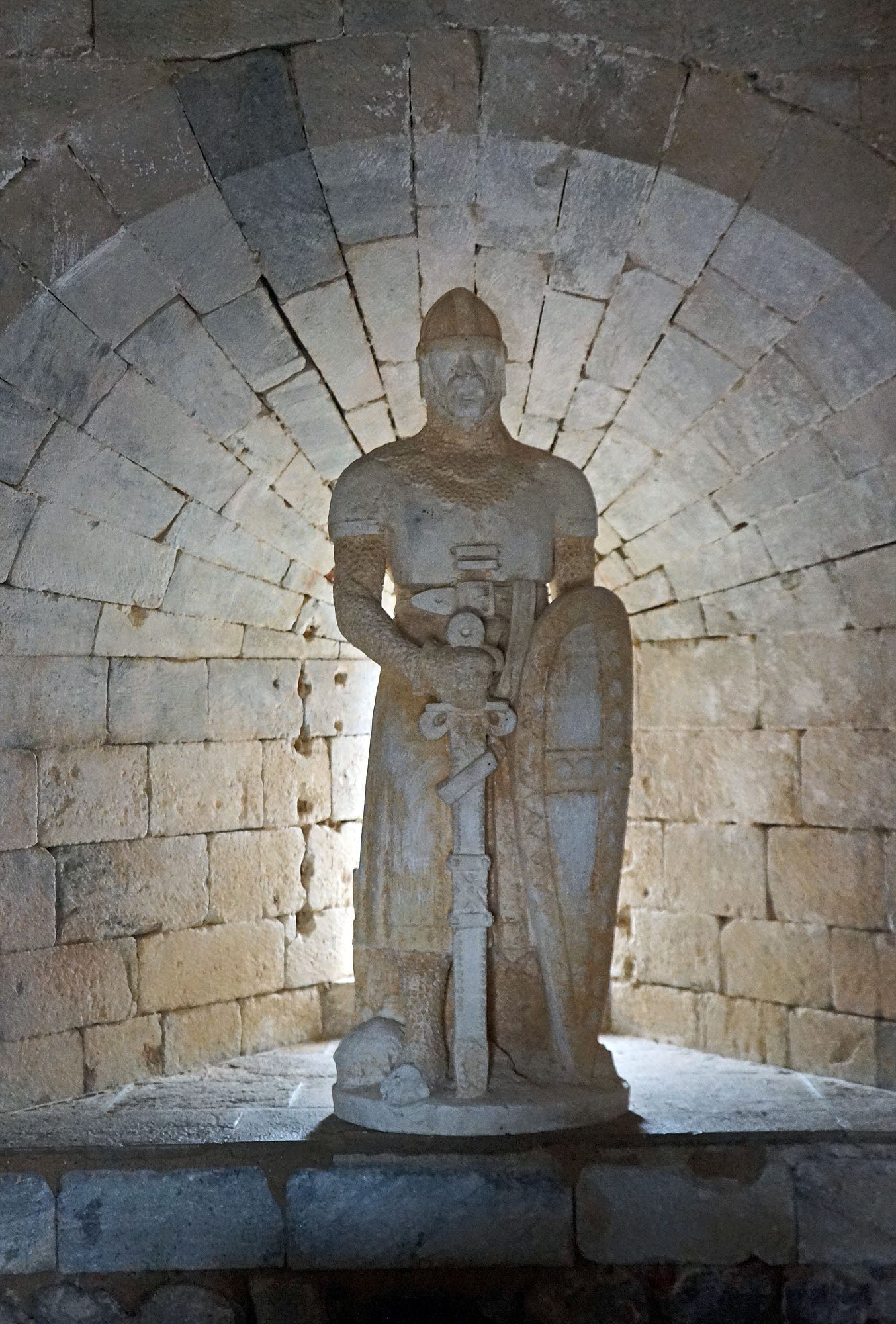
- Statue of Gonçalo Mendes da Maia in Beja
- Born: c. 1079; Maia, County of Portugal
- Died: 1170; Beja, Kingdom of Portugal
- Occupations: Knight, military commander
- Spouse: Gontinha Guterres
- Children: 1

Gonçalo Mendes da Maia (1079? in Maia? – 1170 in Alentejo), also known as O Lidador (The Toiler), so named for his fearlessness in the struggle against the Saracens, was a Portuguese knight of the time of Afonso Henriques, about whom tradition relates important achievements in the events preceding the independence of Portugal.

== Biography ==
Gonçalo was the son of Mem Soares da Maia, brother of the magnate and head of the family, Paio Soares da Maia, and of an unknown mother.

In aftermath of the Battle of Valdevez (at the end of 1128 or the beginning of 1129) Gonçalo, his brothers Soeiro and Paio, and his uncle, Paio Soares da Maia are mentioned as withdrawing to Guimarães acompaningh the great nobility.

On July 25, 1139, Afonso Henriques fought one of the most decisive battles against the Muslims, and obtained one of his most emblematic victoriesː the Battle of Ourique, fought in a location that is still not consensual. Gonçalo would also have participated in that battle, and was probably present at the meeting, in the church of Almacave, where Afonso Henriques was officially proclaimed king by his army.

Gonçalo is said to have married Gontinha Guterres (before 1110-after 1143), patron saint of the Monastery of Rio Tinto, and who appears to acquire a considerable volume of goods in São João da Madeira. The couple had a daughter, Maria Gonçalves, who married Gonçalo Trastamires, her mother's cousin. Believing in the hypothesis that he was still alive in 1159, it is more than likely that Gontinha preceded him in death given that the last document that confirms it dates back to 1143.

There is no news of this notable baron after 1130. As his two brothers died shortly after the Battle of São Mamede, it is possible to extend the period of Gonçalo's life, at most, to 1159.

== Legend ==
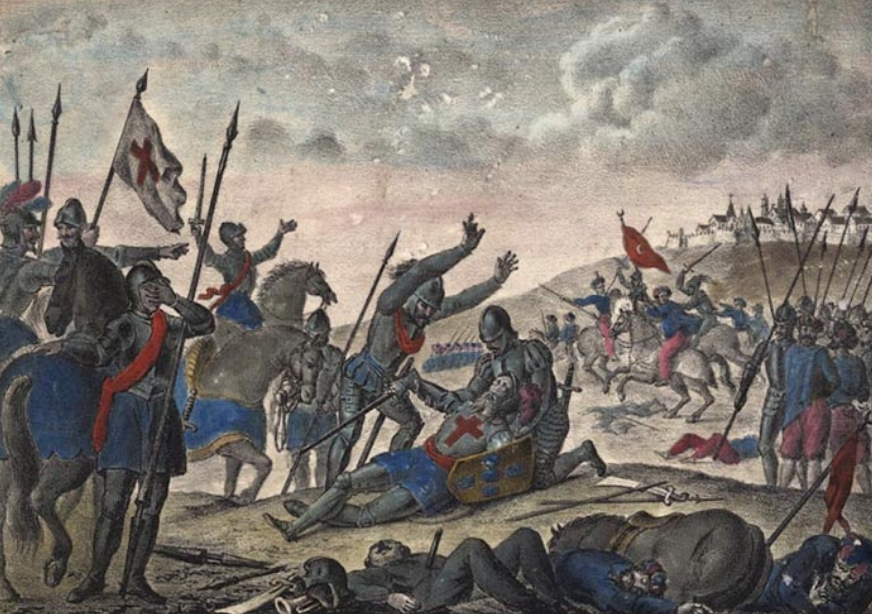
''The Glorious Death of Gonçalo Mendes da Maia'', a 19th century lithograph

Traditionally, Gonçalo Mendes da Maia is considered a hero of both the city of Maia, the homeland of the Mendes da Maia family, and Beja.

According to popular legend, he had a military post as a fronteiro in the border town of Beja, where he died in 1170, while fighting against a Muslim army.

According to some documents, he was at the time ninety years old. On the day he celebrated his 91st birthday, Gonçalo Mendes was at the head of a battle against Muslims in Beja, which was going badly for the Portuguese side. Suddenly he gained renewed vigor and, gathering a group of fighters, attacked the enemy. When he saw an aged soldier attack with the strength of a young man, they thought they were facing a magical act, which reduced their morale. Thus, one of the greatest Muslim leaders decided to face Gonçalo Mendes, hoping to regain the morale of his troops . Despite being seriously injured, Gonçalo Mendes managed to defeat his opponent, with devastating effects, as the Muslim army, without a leader, became disorganized, so the Portuguese troops managed to win the battle, but Gonçalo succumbed to his wounds. This heroic act is still celebrated today and the city of Maia is known as the city of Lidador.

From the implausibility of such an age, it can be concluded that there was in fact another member of the family who shared his name and patronymic, who was in fact born around 1060, but who probably would not have reached the Battle of São Mamede. The aforementioned fight in which Gonçalo perished did not occur in 1170, a date that is also unlikely, given that the list of contenders included men who had already died (such as Lourenço Viegas de Ribadouro, who died in 1160). The most likely thing is that this "Beja fight" was, in fact, a small battle in Alentejo, following the Battle of Ourique. However, according to the "Biography of D. Afonso Henriques" by Diogo Pinto de Freitas do Amaral, it is also implausible that the Battle of Ourique took place in the South of Alentejo, so far from Portucalense territory, having been fought, with greater probability among the various hypotheses, in Campo de Ourique, south of Coimbra, but already within Muslim territory, in 1139.

== See also ==
- Timeline of Portuguese history (First Dynasty)
- Portugal in the Middle Ages
  - Portugal in the Reconquista

== Bibliology ==
- Grande Enciclopédia Portuguesa e Brasileira - 50 vols., Vários, Editorial Enciclopédia, Lisboa. vol. 16-pg. 887.
- D. António Caetano de Sousa, História Genealógica da Casa Real Portuguesa, Atlântida-Livraria Editora, Lda, 2ª Edição, Coimbra, 1946, Tomo XII-P-pg. 147
- Mattoso, José (1981). A nobreza medieval portuguesa: a família e o poder. Lisboa: Editorial Estampa. OCLC 8242615
- Sottomayor-Pizarro, José Augusto (1997). Linhagens Medievais Portuguesas: Genealogias e Estratégias (1279-1325). I. Porto: Universidade do Porto
- Gayo, Manuel José da Costa Felgueiras, Nobiliário das Famílias de Portugal, 2ª Edição, Braga, 1989.
