= Cabeça Gorda =

- Civil parish
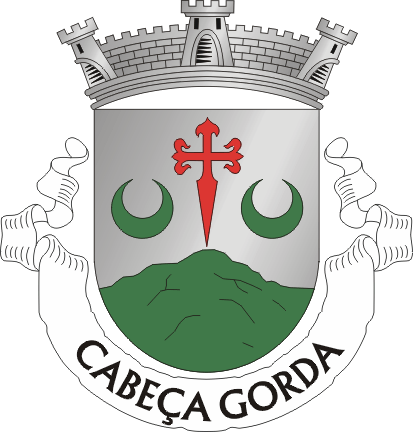
- Coat of arms

- Location in Portugal
- Coordinates: 37.925°N 7.794°W
- Country: Portugal
- Region: Alentejo
- Intermunic. comm.: Baixo Alentejo
- District: Beja
- Municipality: Beja

Area
  - Total: 78.16 km^{2} (30.18 sq mi)

Population (2011)
  - Total: 1,386
  - Density: 17.73/km^{2} (45.93/sq mi)
- Time zone: UTC+00:00 (WET)
  - Summer (DST): UTC+01:00 (WEST)

Cabeça Gorda is a parish of the municipality of Beja, southeast Portugal. Before it was a part of the parish of Salvada. The population in 2011 was 1,386, in an area of 78.16 km^{2}.

== History ==
The parish was officially established in 1901 under the name Nossa Senhora da Conceição da Rocha, but the official name didn't stick over time. However, according to historical data, the village's history can be traced back to the Muslim Conquest of the Iberian Peninsula around 702 AD.

The name originated from "cabeço" ("hill") and "gorda" (adj. "great width of this elevation"), together meaning "large hill" or large elevation. Cabeça Gorda is situated at the highest point in the region, and it is believed that the village's name originated from observing this fact.
