= Castle of Beja =

Medieval castle in Beja, Portugal

- Castelo de Beja
- Beja, Baixo Alentejo, Alentejo in Portugal
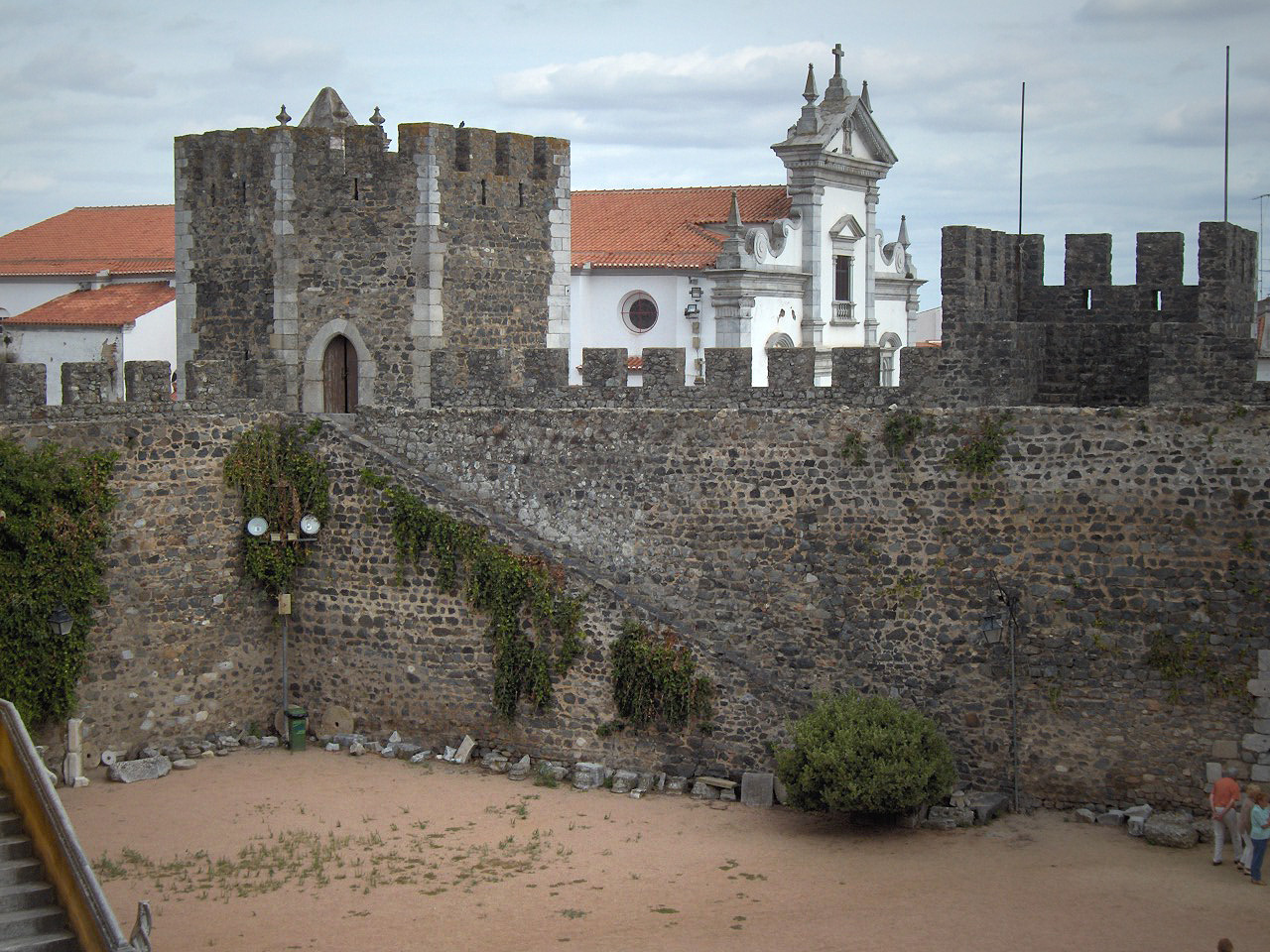
- A view of the wall fortifications and entrance, with a view of Sé Cathedral

Site information
- Type: Castle
- Owner: Portuguese Republic
- Operator: Câmara Municipal de Beja (transfer notices 20 December 1939 and 20 December 1945)
- Open to the public: Public

Location
- Coordinates: 38°1′2″N 7°51′54.4″W

Site history
- Built: 4th century
- Materials: Limestone, Marble, Mixed masonry, Tile, Iron, Glass

The Castle of Beja (Portuguese: Castelo de Beja) is a medieval castle in the civil parish of Beja, municipality of Beja, Portuguese district of Beja.

== History ==
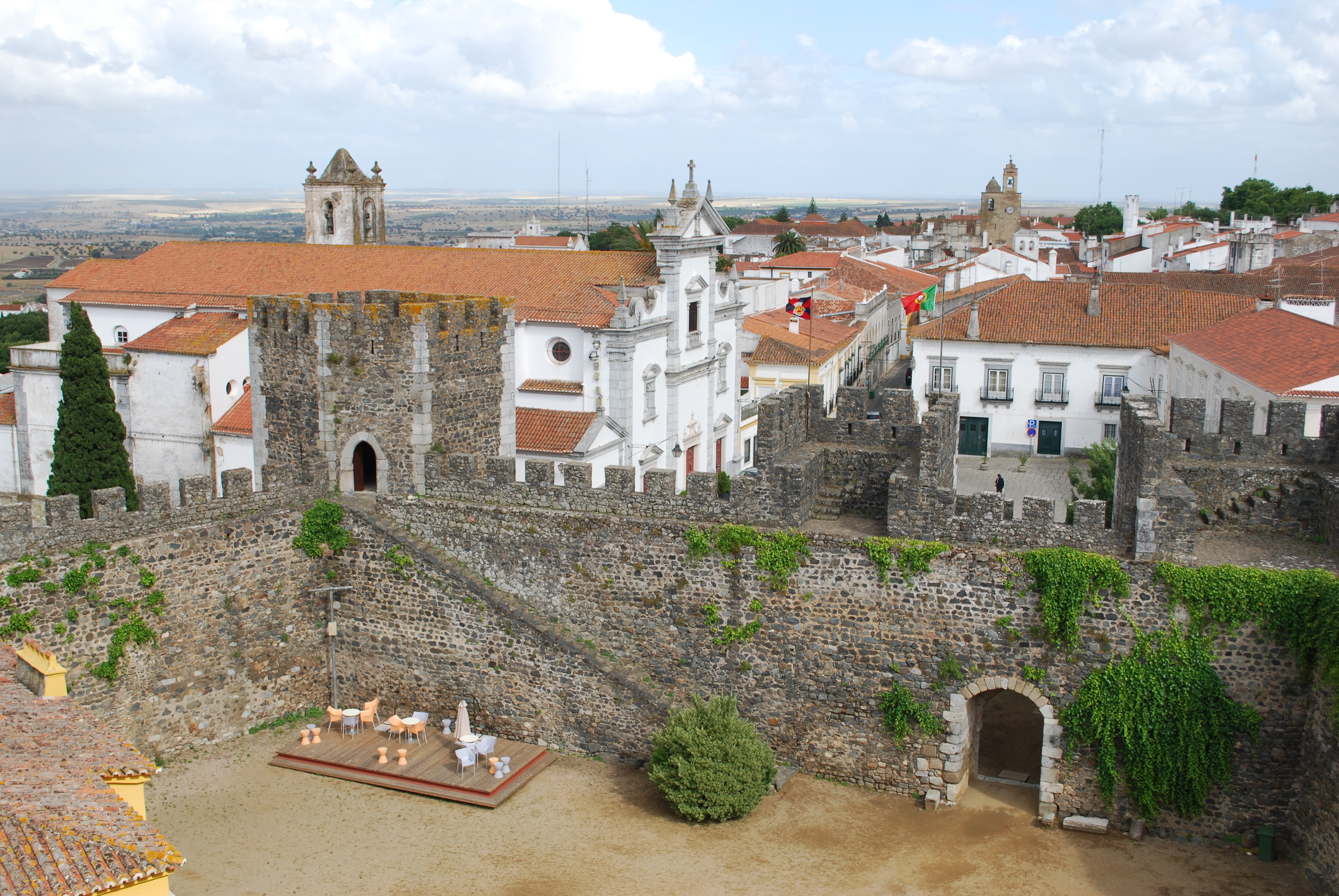
The castle seen from the keep with courtyard and semi-circular towers

This region of the Alentejo had been settled since pre-history by disperse tribes, but it was first mentioned in the writings of Ptolemy and Polybius. But, it was sometime between the beginning of the 3rd century and the end of the 4th century, that the walls of Pax Julia were constructed; part of the Roman arch (Évora Gate) dated from this general construction in the Roman provinces. Its importance within the region continued during the Suebi era, Visigothic settlement and Moors occupation of the Iberian peninsula.

During the Reconquista from the Moors, the region was first conquered in 1159 by the forces of King Afonso Henriques (1112-1185), but it was abandoned four months later by his forces.

In 1253, King D. Afonso III began work on reconstructing the fortress, which was already a severe stage of degradation. A foral (charter) was issued to Beja in 1254.

Around 1307, a tower was constructed along the wall, as indicated in an inscription carved into decorated ashlar masonry, in the form of a Portuguese shield, and dating to the Visigoth occupation.

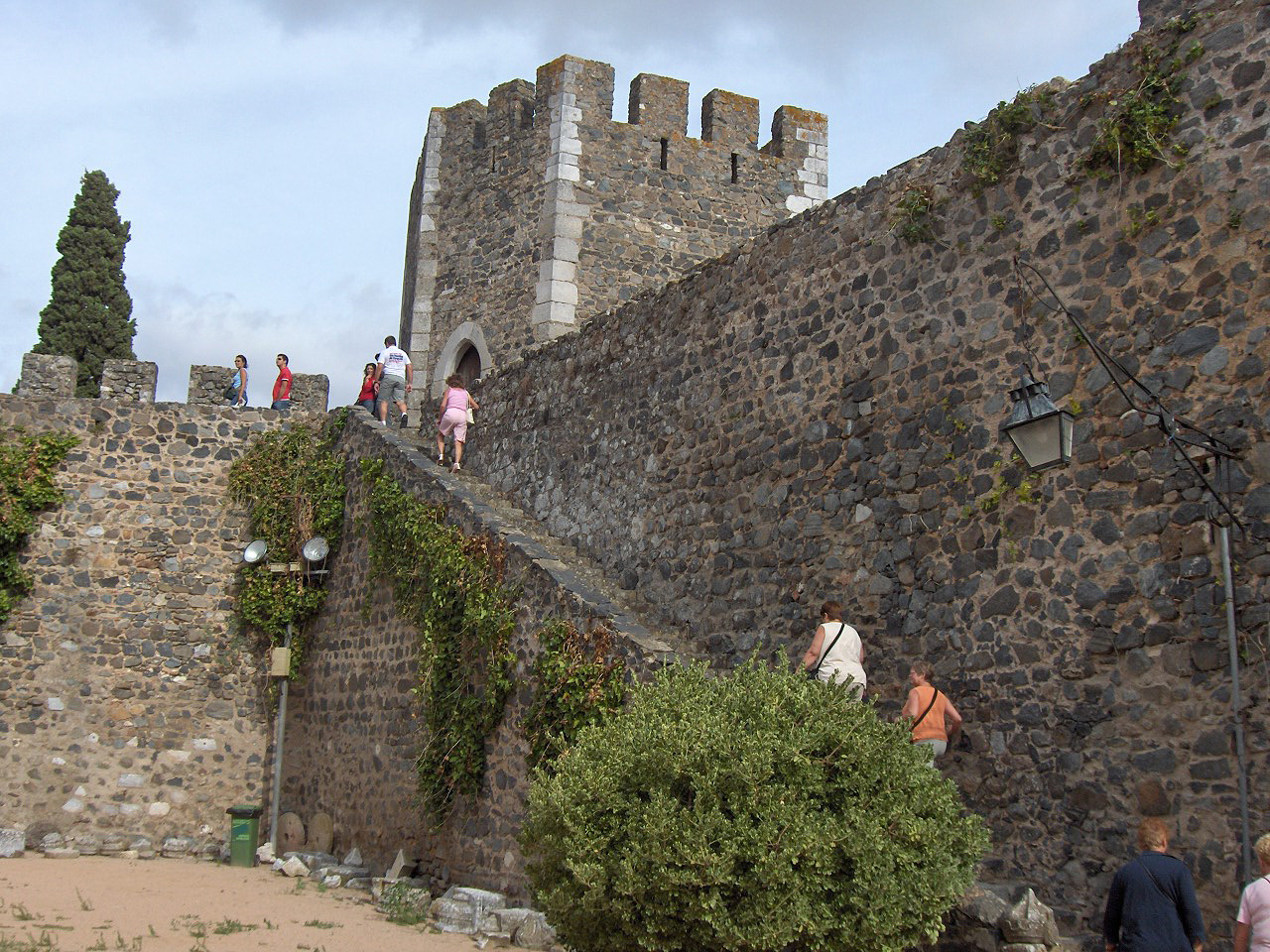
The inner walls from the courtyard

King D. Dinis ordered the construction of the keep tower in 1310, following the issue of new charter. Work on the walls proceed from 1347, under the overseer João Domingues de Beja and Afonso Mendes (from an inscription).

The village supported the King John I during 1383-1385 Portuguese succession crisis.

At the beginning of the 16th century, King D. Manuel I began a project to improve the fortification, that possibly included the construction of the vaulted ceiling in the keep tower. During this time, a second larger gate was constructed between the Roman arch (which had disappeared) and the Hospital of Misericórdia. A project to reinforce the bastions was initiated in 1664 by Nicolau de Langres, approved by Luís Serrão Pimentel (Royal engineer and cosmographer) and General Agostinho de Andrade Freire. Between 1669 and 1679, the endeavour was supervised by engineers João Coutinho, Diogo de Brito de Castanheda and Manuel Almeida Falcão.

In 1790, part of the fortifications were demolished in order to construct the new church of the (extinct) Colégio dos Jesuítas, for the Episcopal See.

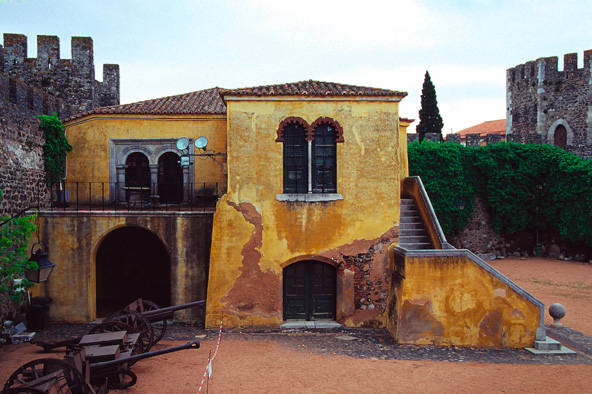
The Governor's residence within the courtyard addorsed to the northern and eastern walls

In the early nineteenth century, following the outbreak of the Peninsular Wars, the city of Beja opposed Napoleonic troops, and as a result, the forces under the command of General Jean-Andoche Junot in 1808, killed about 1,200 people in the region.

Most of the work accomplished on the site were associated with 1854, following the events of the Liberal Wars, when the region was devastated.

In 1867, the Moorish Gate was reconstructed, but two years later, the New Gate of Évora was demolished, since it affected/impeded transit. Similar issues resulted in the demolition of the Hermitage of Nossa Senhora da Guia and Romana arch of the Aviz Gate in 1893.

=== 20th century ===
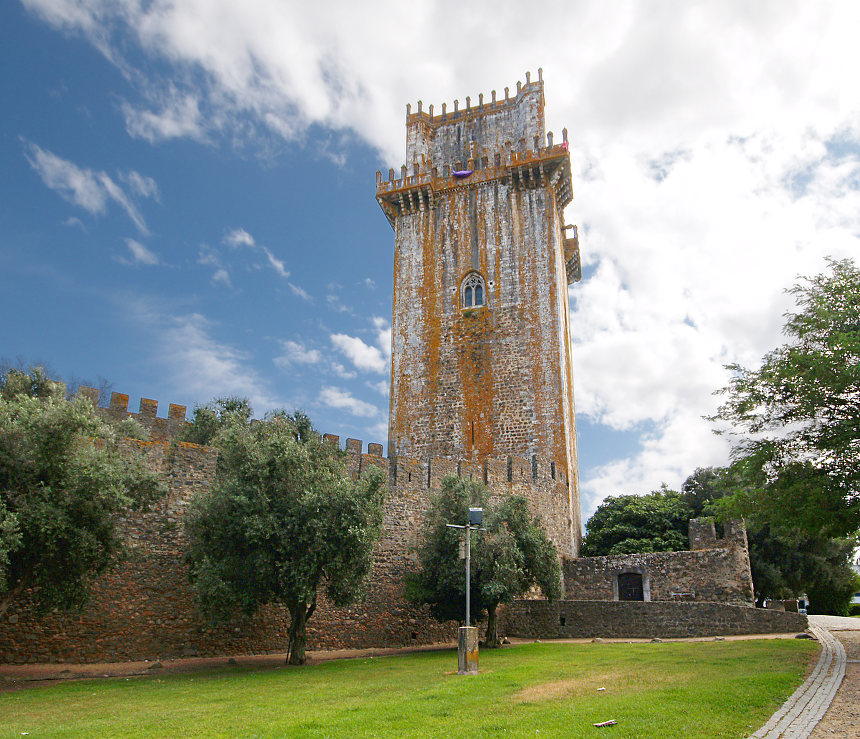
The tower keep seen from the southern Rua Antero de Quental

The Portuguese government classified the castle as National Monument by Decree published on 16 June 1910. In order to recuperate the architectural heritage, in 1938 the Roman arch (Évora Gate) was reconstructed and the fortification walls rebuilt from the backyards and homes that intersected the old lines. This involved the removing obstructions, consolidation of the Gate, reconstruction of the Alcácçova and Roman arch. Over time there were various individual projects: in 1965, work on the keep tower; in 1969, consolidation of the tower and walls between Rua das Portas Aljustrel and Rua da Liberdade; between 1970-1973, consolidation between castle and Avis Gate; between 1980-1981, recuperation of the castle, Aviz Gate and keep; and in 1982, general work on the walls. This movement culminated in the 1960s study to re-landscape and integrate the old fortifications into aesthetic of the town, undertaken by architectural landscaper António Viana Barreto.

A competition was initiated on 16 March 2004, sponsored by the DGEMN/DREMS, to recuperate the area that included the castle, supported the following year (September), by a risk assessment study by the DGEMN. This work had begun in 2003, with the clearing of built vegetation accumulated in the walls, battlements and joints, and the repair of these segments with lime mortar and sand, as well as the treatment of parapets and adarves. The municipal council continued between 2007 and 2008, with the removal of evasive plants, cleaning of bird droppings and the construction of structures to impede further destruction by birds. This work lead to the implementation of a February 2008 program to reuse the former Governor's Residence into a military museum, tourist centre and cafeteria.

The first archaeological excavations were initiated in 2008 by the municipal authority of Beja. In November 2014, due to issues of safety and security, the keep tower was closed to the public, following the collapse of a balcony. It was only reopened on 19 July 2016. Between 2014 and 2015, archeological excavations were undertaken at the top of the hilltop of Outeiro do Circo, that also included conservation of the keep tower. The following year, in March, during work in the park of Vista Alegre, archaeological vestiges of a gate and former-Roman wall, and in August, further excavations were initiated in Outeiro do Circo along the northwest wall, associated with the late Bronze Age fortification. A joint project between the Câmara Municipal of Beja and the DRCAlentejo continued to work on conservation in the keep tower, costing 500,000 Euros, that included a 2016 project to recuperate the walls of the Terreirinho das Peças, for 71,000 Euros.

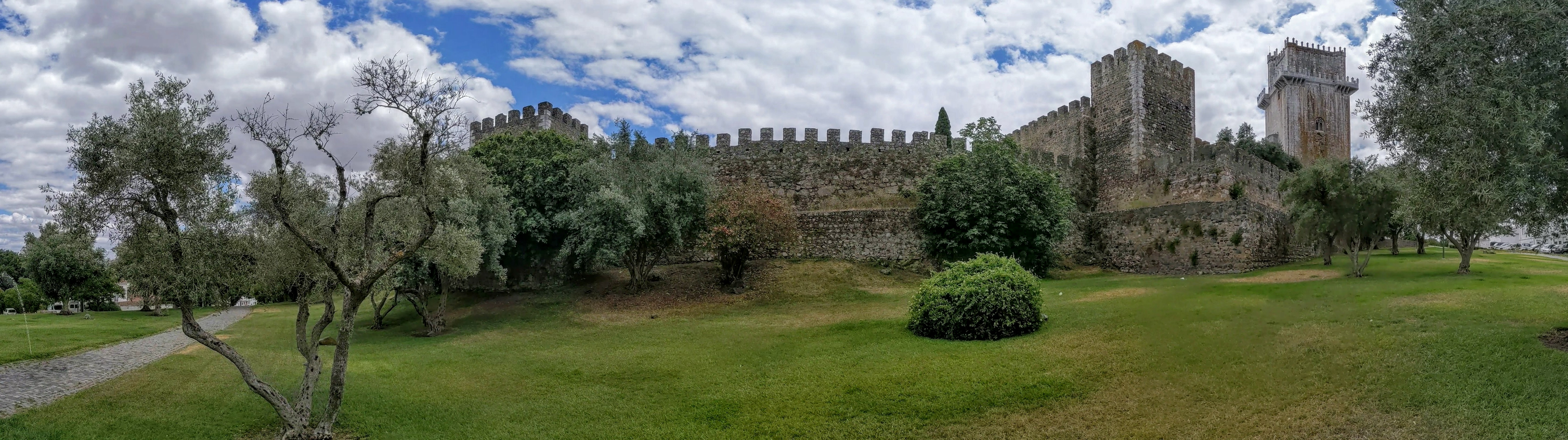
Panoramic view from the garden, 2019

== Architecture ==
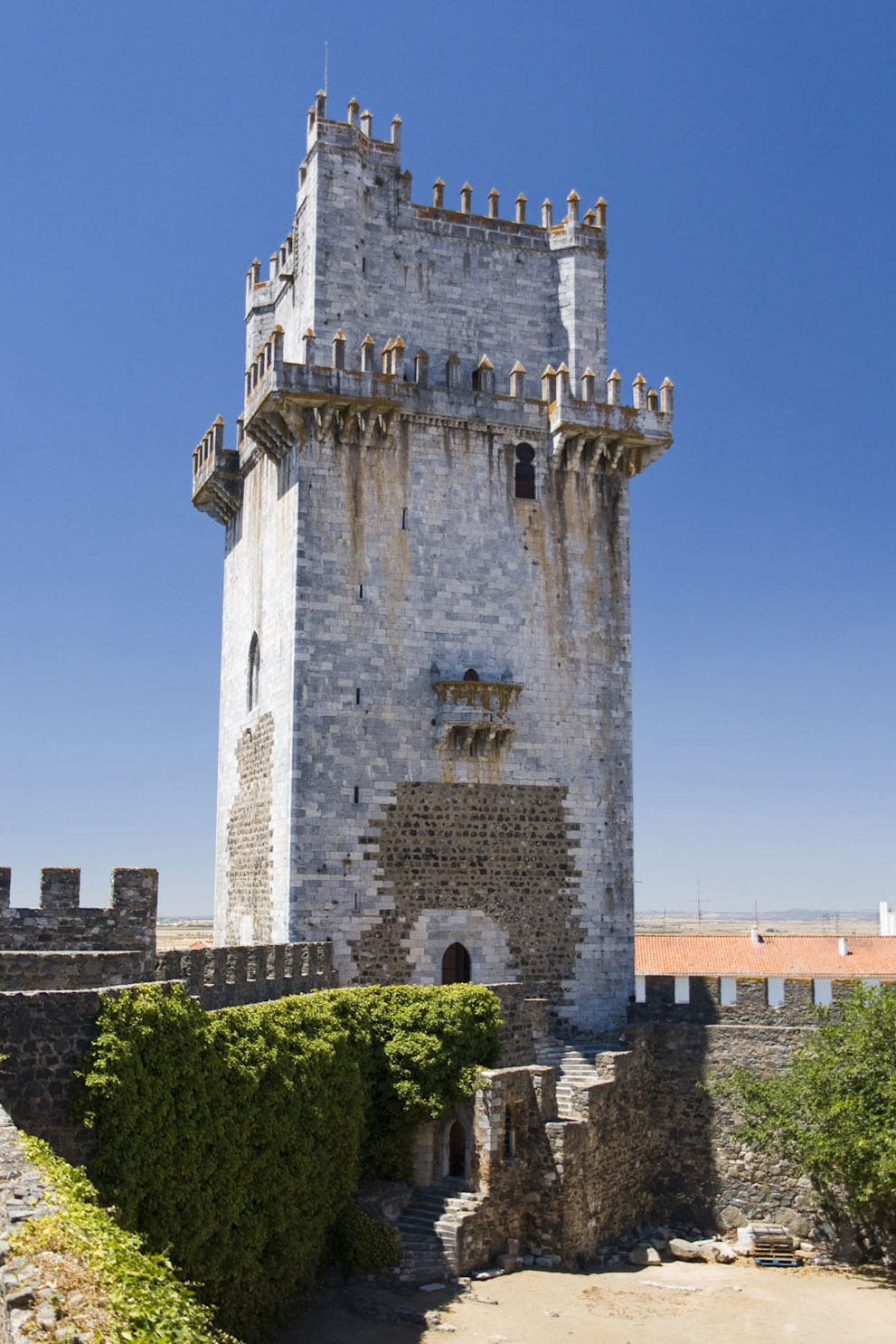
Detail of the keep tower with its alternating rectangular and polygonal floors

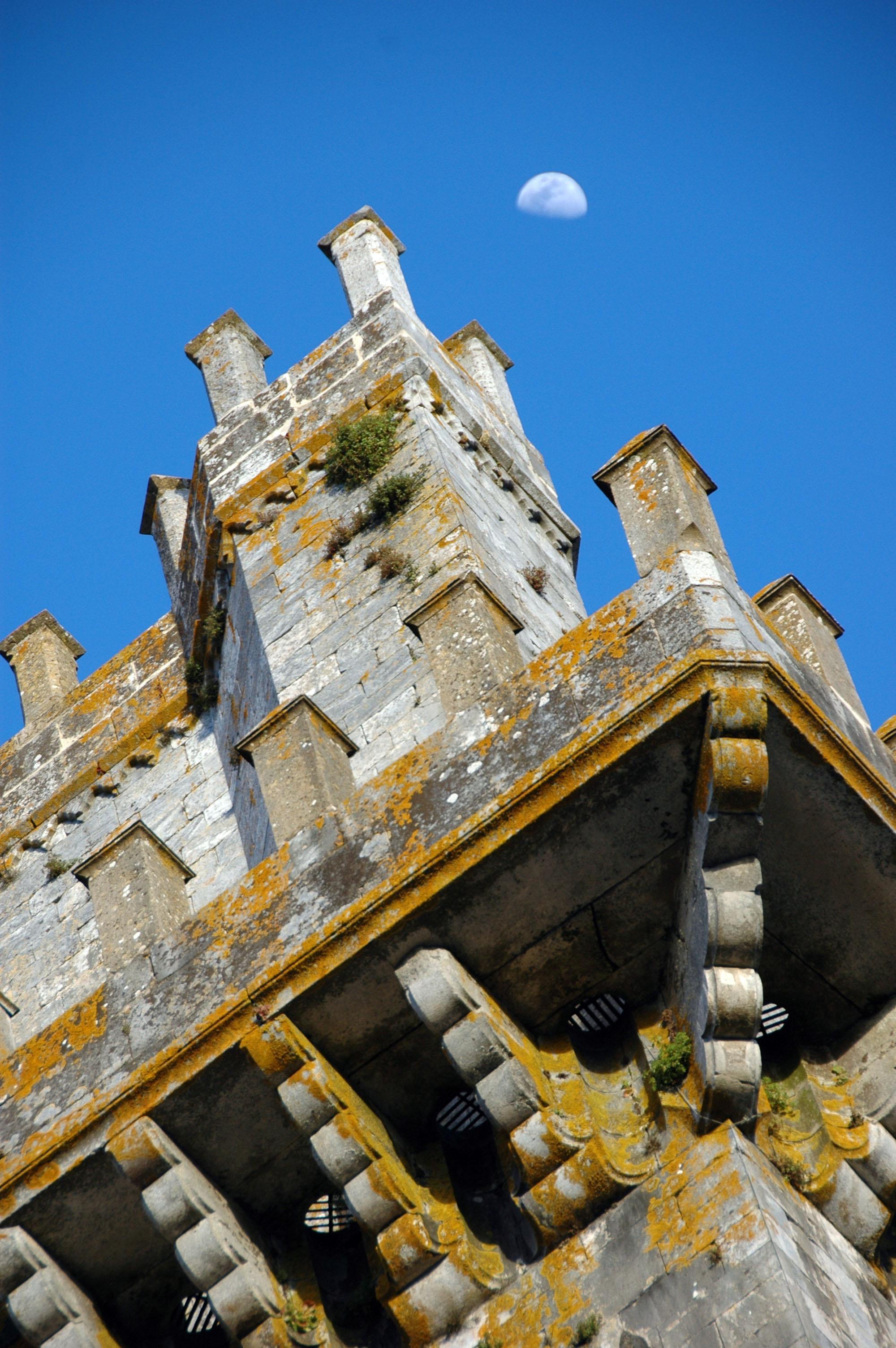
Detail of the machicolations from the first floors to the third

The remnants of the castle are situated on a hilltop, along which extends the wall fortifications of the city Beja, encircled by landscaped gardens. Immediately nearby are the Sé Cathedral, Chapel of Santo Amaro, the building of the Hospital da Misericórdia, residences of the Guedes and Campos families, and municipal palace.

The castle is the principal nucleus of a group of fortifications that encompass the medieval city, implanted in its northwest corner. It is an irregular pentagonal plan, with a partially-encircled irregular barbican to the north and southern line. The two lines of walls are lined with parallel merlons over embrasures, internally encircled by adarves and reinforced by corbels and towers, protected by battlements towers. The exception is the eastern tower, an irregular pentagon, addorsed externally on the castle angle, and two semi-circular corbel, that reinforces the southeast barbican with gates.

The Praça de Armas (place-of-arms) is accessible from these gates which links to the other wall fortifications, between corbels, and the other open to the north. In the interior, addorsed to the north and eastern walls, is the two-storey Casa do Governador (Governor's Residence). The residence has a first-floor chimney with entrance torn by arched openings, one that provides access to barbican to the north, that includes second-storey windows.

The tower keep is situated in the northeast, and projects to the exterior; it is 40 metres (130 ft) tall tower, approximately three stories, with adarves and machicolations and marked by prismatic merlons and covered with a terrace. Each space has different plans. The first registry, includes has two pentagonal floors marked by spaces of differing profile: the facade oriented to the praça de armas has a Roman portico, a balcony window and an arched window. Over this space, circled by adarves, is a smaller second floor, prismatic with small polygonal towers, corresponding to the third floor, with door. Below the parapet covered in merlons with a tri-lobe freise and zoomorphic gargoyles.

=== Interior ===
The three floors of the tower are linked by circular staircase, with one space per floor, the floors are rectangular on the first and third floors and octagonal on the second floor. The first floor is covered with polygonal copula and ribs over half columns, decorated in sculpted vegetal surfaces. The second floor is illuminated by four windows and includes a vaulted ceiling with ribs forming an eight-pointed star and decorated in with vegetal forms supported by anthropomorphic sculptures. Similarly, the third floor is covered in vaulted ceiling cruciform of ogives.
