= Mariana (Vaz novel) =

Book by Katherine Vaz

- Author: Katherine Vaz
- Language: English
- Publication date: 1997
- Publication place: United States

Mariana is the second novel by Katherine Vaz, published in 1997. Originally written in English, it was published by Flamingo/HarperCollin. The novel was selected by the Library of Congress as one of the Top 30 International Books of 1998. The novel has been translated into more than six languages including Portuguese, Italian, and Greek.

== Plot ==
The plot retells the seventeenth-century romance between Mariana Alcoforado, a nun at the Convent of Beja, and an officer in the French army.
