= Beja (Salvador e Santa Maria da Feira) =

União das Freguesias de Beja e Salvador e Santa Maria da Feira
- Civil parish
- Location in Portugal
- Coordinates: 38.015°N 7.863°W
- Country: Portugal
- Region: Alentejo
- Intermunic. comm.: Baixo Alentejo
- District: Beja
- Municipality: Beja

Area
  - Total: 22.51 km^{2} (8.69 sq mi)

Population (2011)
  - Total: 11,133
  - Density: 490/km^{2} (1,300/sq mi)
- Time zone: UTC+00:00 (WET)
  - Summer (DST): UTC+01:00 (WEST)

União das Freguesias de Beja e Salvador e Santa Maria da Feira) is a parish in the Concelho of Beja, Portugal. It was formed in 2013 by the merger of the former parishes Salvador and Santa Maria da Feira. The population in 2011 was 11,133, in an area of 22.51 km^{2}.
