= Albernoa e Trindade =

- Civil parish
- Location in Portugal
- Coordinates: 37.860°N 7.959°W
- Country: Portugal
- Region: Alentejo
- Intermunic. comm.: Baixo Alentejo
- District: Beja
- Municipality: Beja

Area
  - Total: 209.39 km^{2} (80.85 sq mi)

Population (2011)
  - Total: 1,032
  - Density: 4.9/km^{2} (13/sq mi)
- Time zone: UTC+00:00 (WET)
  - Summer (DST): UTC+01:00 (WEST)

Albernoa e Trindade is a civil parish in the municipality of Beja, Portugal. It was formed in 2013 by the merger of the former parishes Albernoa and Trindade. The population in 2011 was 1,032, in an area of 209.39 km^{2}.
