= Trigaches e São Brissos =

- Civil parish
- Location in Portugal
- Coordinates: 38.090°N 7.972°W
- Country: Portugal
- Region: Alentejo
- Intermunic. comm.: Baixo Alentejo
- District: Beja
- Municipality: Beja

Area
  - Total: 68.26 km^{2} (26.36 sq mi)

Population (2011)
  - Total: 572
  - Density: 8.4/km^{2} (22/sq mi)
- Time zone: UTC+00:00 (WET)
  - Summer (DST): UTC+01:00 (WEST)

Trigaches e São Brissos is a civil parish in the municipality of Beja, Portugal. It was formed in 2013 by the merger of the former parishes Trigaches and São Brissos. The population in 2011 was 572, in an area of 68.26 km^{2}.
