= Santa Vitória e Mombeja =

- Civil parish
- Location in Portugal
- Coordinates: 37.966°N 8.026°W
- Country: Portugal
- Region: Alentejo
- Intermunic. comm.: Baixo Alentejo
- District: Beja
- Municipality: Beja

Area
  - Total: 167.10 km^{2} (64.52 sq mi)

Population (2011)
  - Total: 981
  - Density: 5.9/km^{2} (15/sq mi)
- Time zone: UTC+00:00 (WET)
  - Summer (DST): UTC+01:00 (WEST)

Santa Vitória e Mombeja is a civil parish in the municipality of Beja, Portugal. It was formed in 2013 by the merger of the former parishes Santa Vitória and Mombeja. The population in 2011 was 981, in an area of 167.10 km^{2}.
