= Nossa Senhora das Neves =

- Civil parish
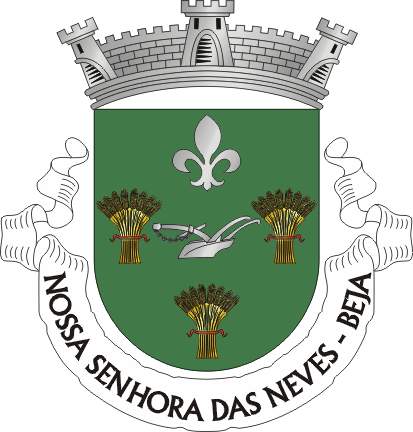
- Coat of arms

- Location in Portugal
- Coordinates: 38.022°N 7.811°W
- Country: Portugal
- Region: Alentejo
- Intermunic. comm.: Baixo Alentejo
- District: Beja
- Municipality: Beja

Area
  - Total: 53.14 km^{2} (20.52 sq mi)

Population (2011)
  - Total: 1,747
  - Density: 33/km^{2} (85/sq mi)
- Time zone: UTC+00:00 (WET)
  - Summer (DST): UTC+01:00 (WEST)

Nossa Senhora das Neves is a parish of the municipality of Beja, in southeast Portugal. The population in 2011 was 1,747, in an area of 53.14 km^{2}.
