= Beja, Portugal =

City in the Baixo Alentejo, Portugal

Beja
- City, municipality and district capital
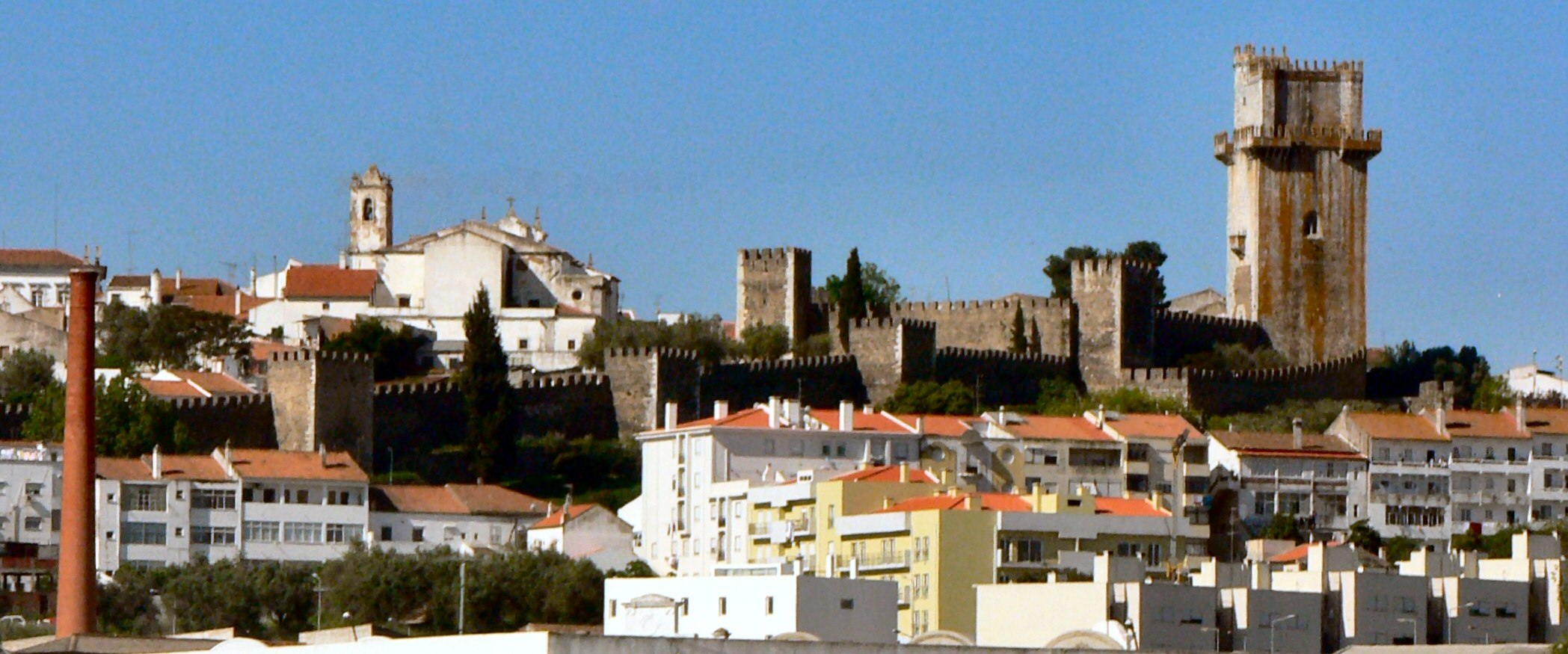
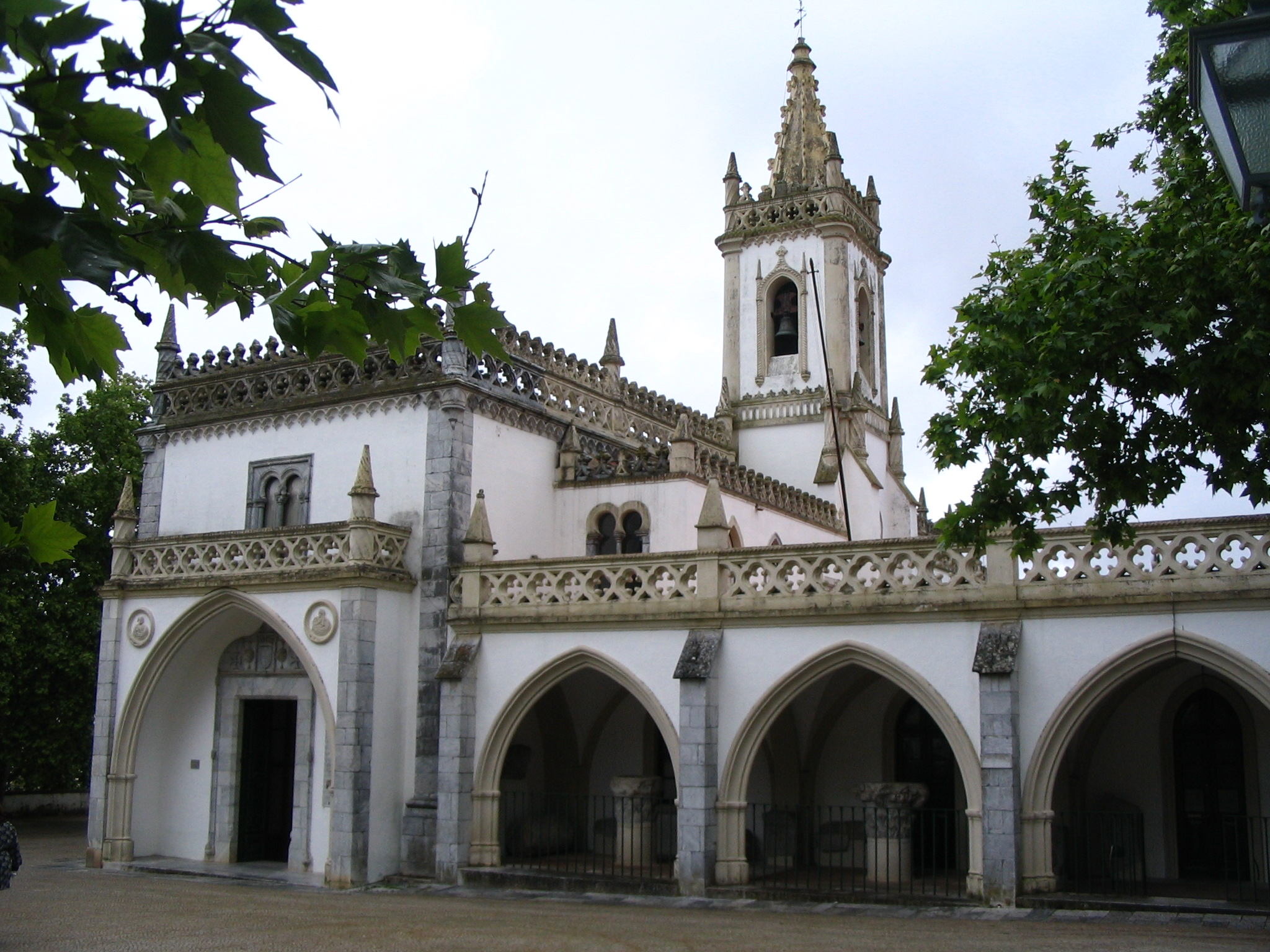
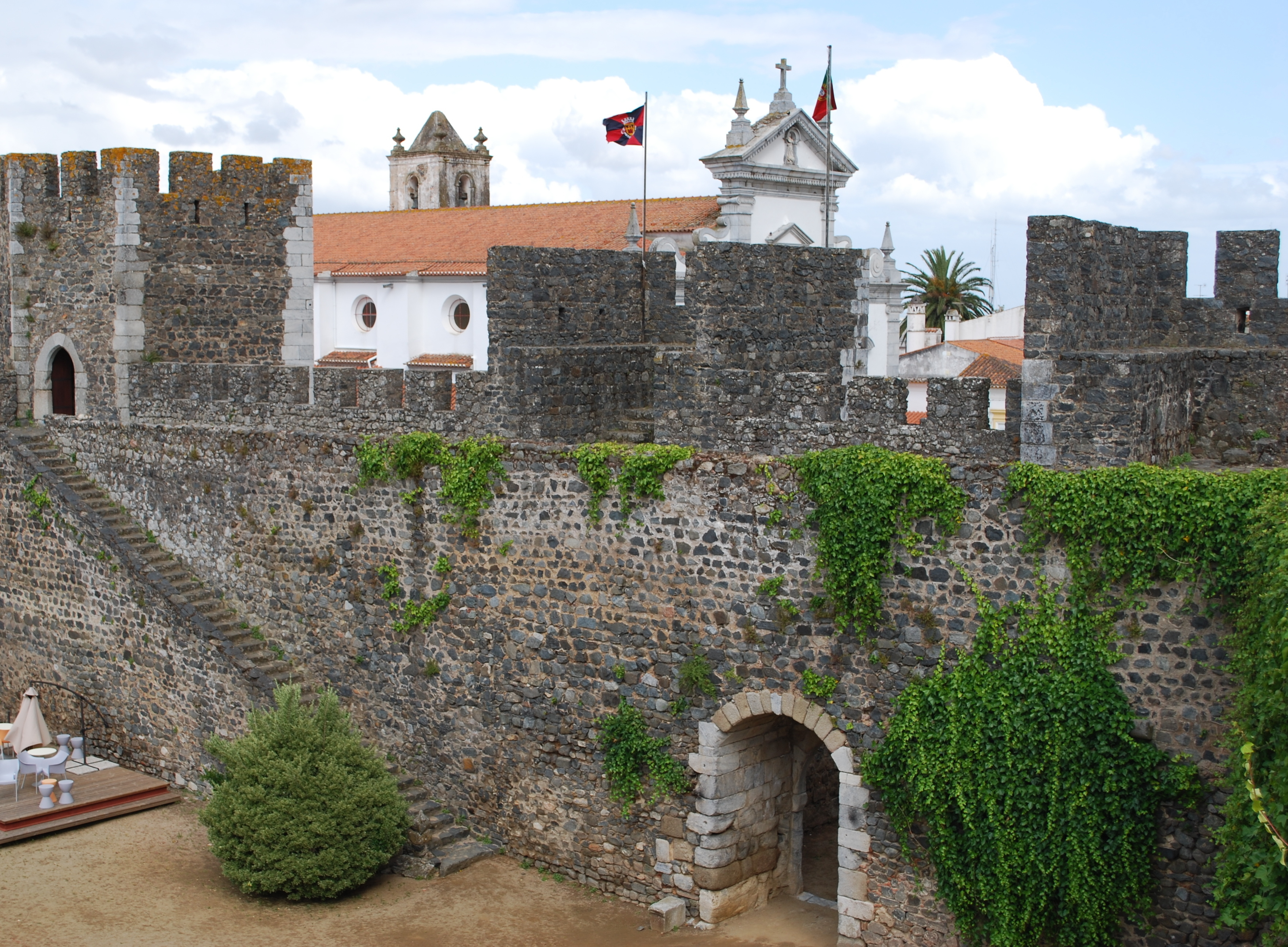
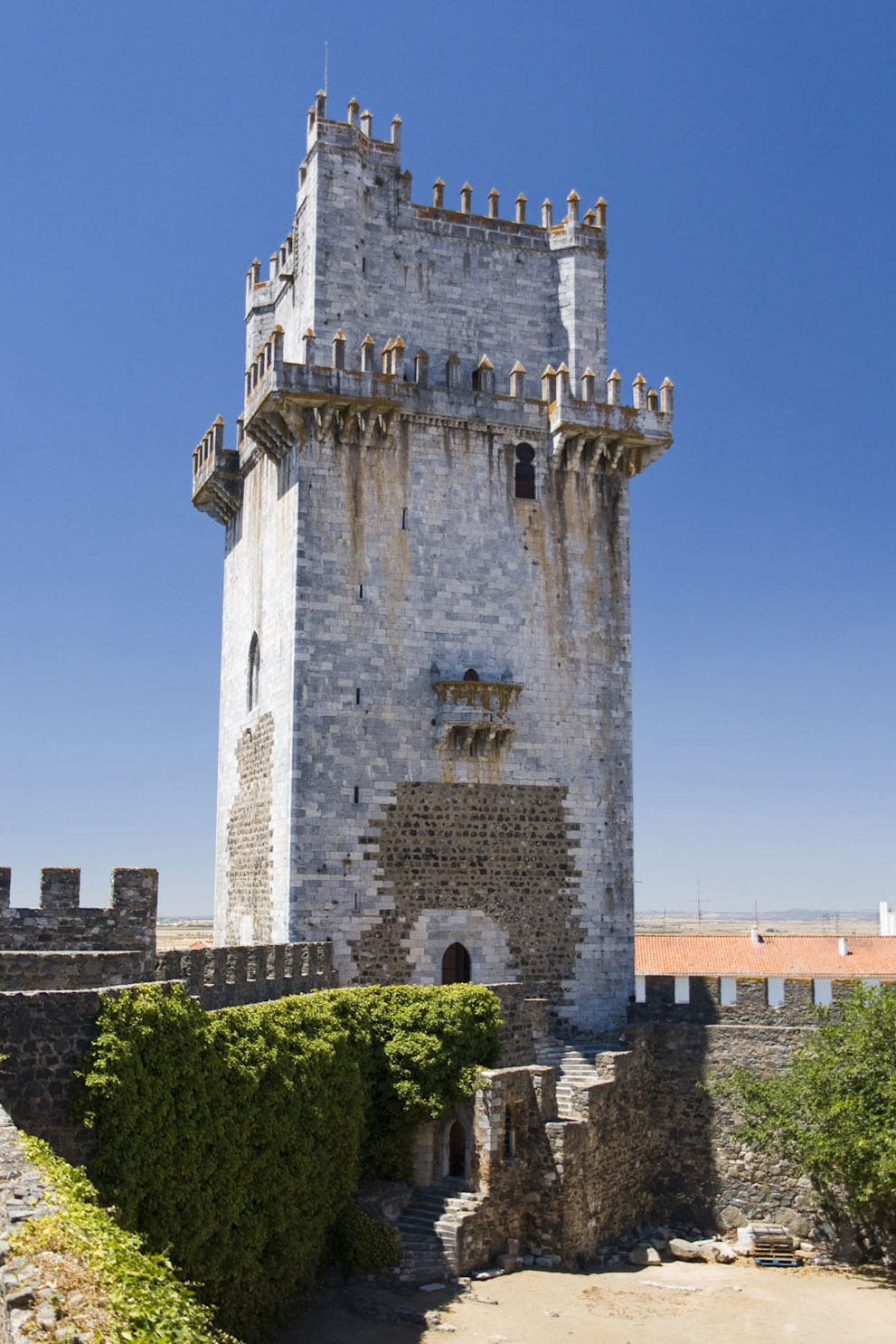
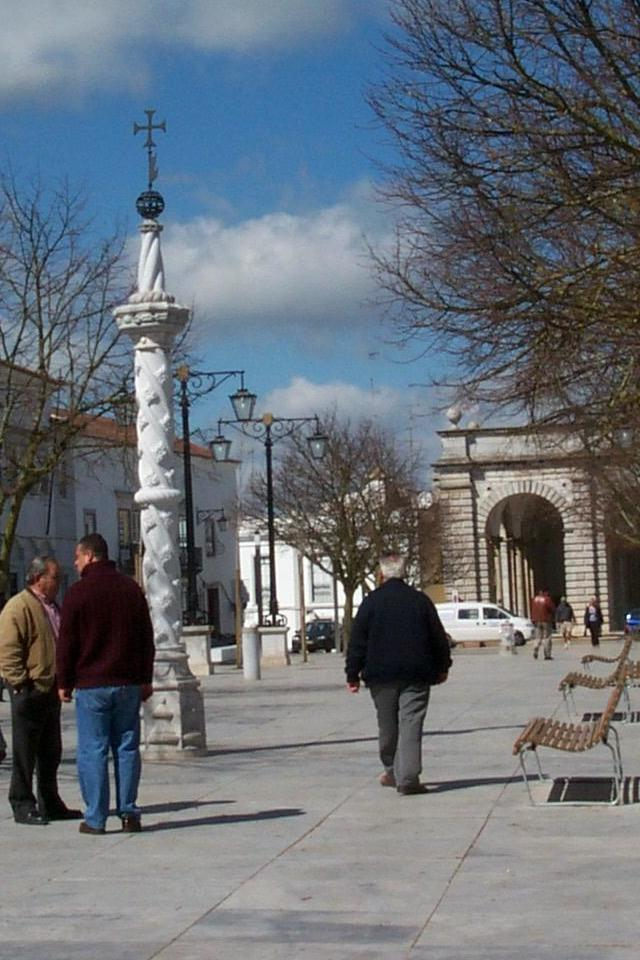
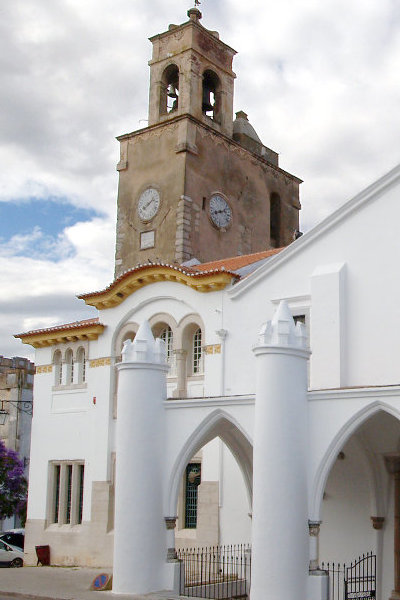
- Left to right, from top: City panorama with Beja Castle, Convent of Beja, Castle interior with Beja Cathedral (See) in the background, the Castle Keep, Praça da República, Church of Santa Maria da Feira

- Flag Coat of arms
- Interactive map of Beja
- Location within Portugal
- Coordinates: 38°02′N 7°53′W
- Country: Portugal
- Region: Alentejo
- Intermunicipal community: Baixo Alentejo
- District: Beja
- Historical province: Baixo Alentejo (1936 map), Alentejo (pre-1832)
- Established: Antiquity
- Roman Pax Julia: 48 BCE
- Definitive conquest: 1232-1234
- Afonsine charter: 16 February 1254
- Manueline charter: 1510
- City status: 1518/1521
- Civil parishes: 12

Government
  - Type: Municipality (LAU)
  - Body: Câmara Municipal (executive); Municipal Assembly (deliberative)
  - Mayor (2025-29): Nuno Palma Ferro (Beja Consegue (PSD/CDS-PP/IL))
  - President of the Assembly: Filipe Pombeiro (Beja Consegue (PSD/ CDS-PP/IL))

Area
  - Total: 1,146.44 km^{2} (442.64 sq mi)
  - City-proper (INE): 11.60 km^{2} (4.48 sq mi)

Population (2021)
  - Total: 33,401
  - Density: 29.135/km^{2} (75.458/sq mi)
  - City-proper (INE): 22,362
  - City-proper (INE) density: 1,928/km^{2} (4,993/sq mi)
- Demonym(s): pacense, bejense
- Time zone: UTC+00:00 (WET)
  - Summer (DST): UTC+01:00 (WEST)
- Postal code: 7800
- Area code: 284
- Dicofre code: 0205
- Patron saint: Saint Sisenandus of Beja
- Municipal holiday: Ascension Day (date varies)
- Website: www.cm-beja.pt

Beja (Portuguese pronunciation: [ˈbɛʒɐ]), officially styled the City of Beja (Portuguese: Cidade de Beja), is a city and municipality in the Alentejo region of southern Portugal, as well as the capital of the eponymous district. The population in 2021 was 33,401, in an area of 1,146.44 km^{2} (442.64 sq mi). The city proper had a population of 21,658 in 2001.

The municipality is the capital of the Beja District. The municipal holiday is Ascension Day. The Portuguese Air Force has an airbase in the area – the Air Base No. 11.

== History ==
Situated on a 277-metre (909 ft) hill, commanding a strategic position over the vast plains of the Lower Alentejo, Beja was already an important place in antiquity. Already inhabited in Celtic times. Recently, remains as far back as the 7th century BC, were found during archaeology studies in the city centre that began during the 1990s. The city has been considered one possibility for the place known as Conistorgis, a relevant settlement of the Cynetes and mentioned by Plato and Strabo in their studies, although this hypothesis is not consensual among academics. Friar Manuel do Cenáculo also mentions in 1800 that prior to roman presence, the settlement had the name of "Ges".

The town was later named Pax Julia by Julius Caesar in 48 BCE, when he made peace with the Lusitanians. He raised the town to be the capital of the southernmost province of Lusitania (Santarém and Braga were the other capitals of the conventi). During the reign of emperor Augustus the thriving town became Pax Augusta. It was already a strategic road junction.

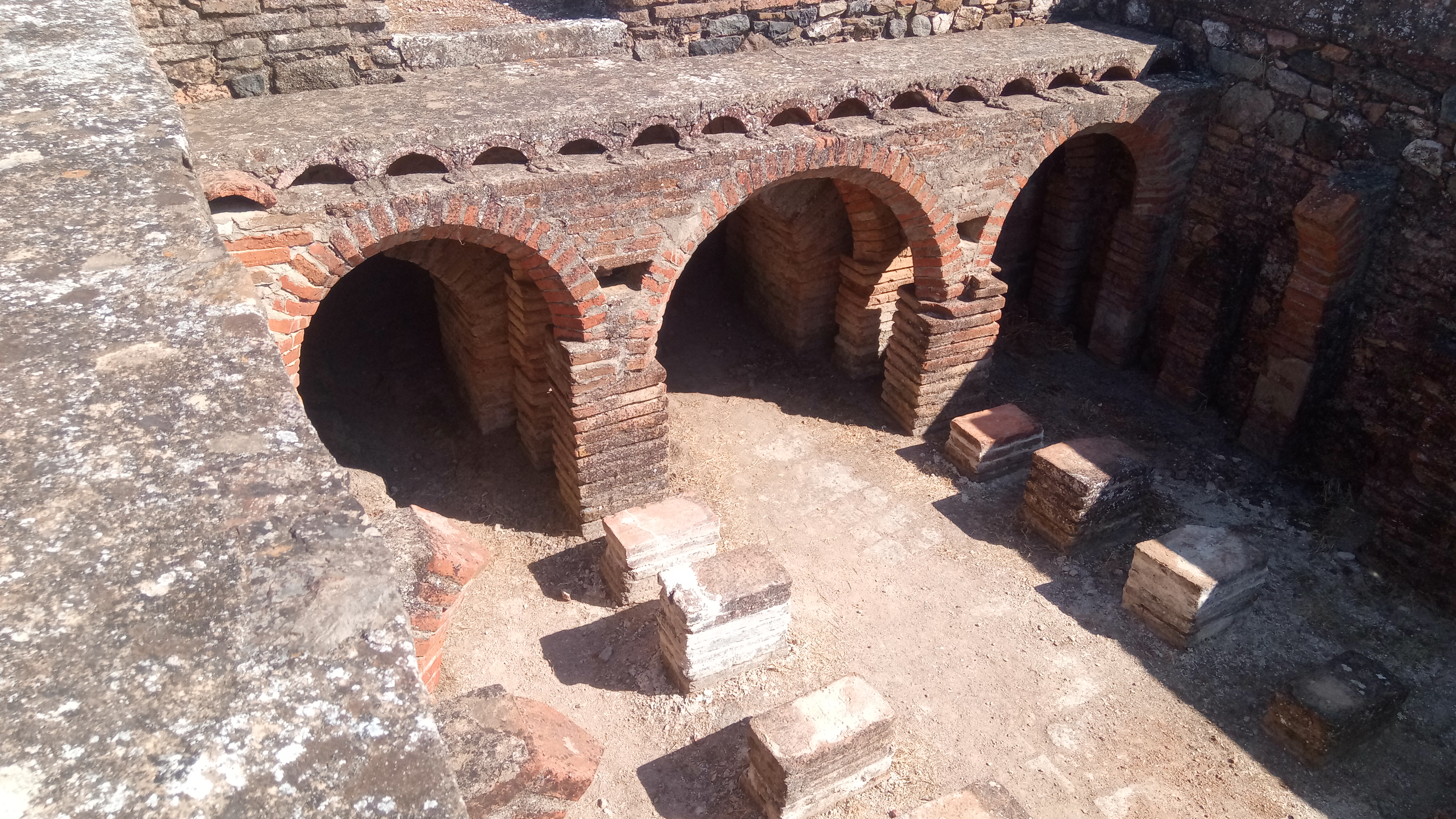
Baths of the Roman Villa of Pisões, ruins on the city's outskirts near Penedo Gordo

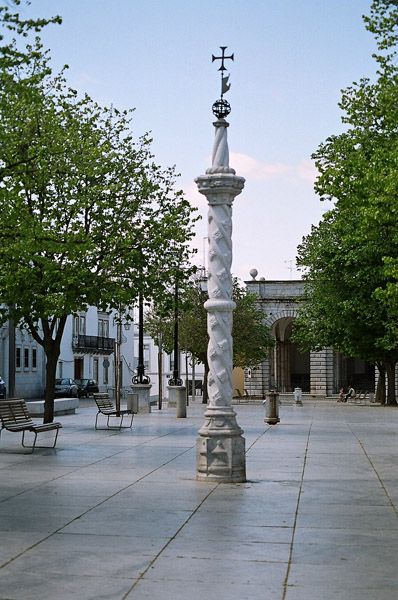
The city pillory in Praça da República

When the Visigoths took over the region, they called the town Paca (a direct derivation or shortening of the Latin Pax or Pace-Augusta) which then became the seat of a bishopric. Saint Apringius (died in 530) became the first Visigothic bishop of Paca. The town fell to the invading Umayyad army in 713. Paca was then adapted to Arabic Baja (Arabic: باجة), as there is no "p" sound in Arabic, and eventually became Beja.

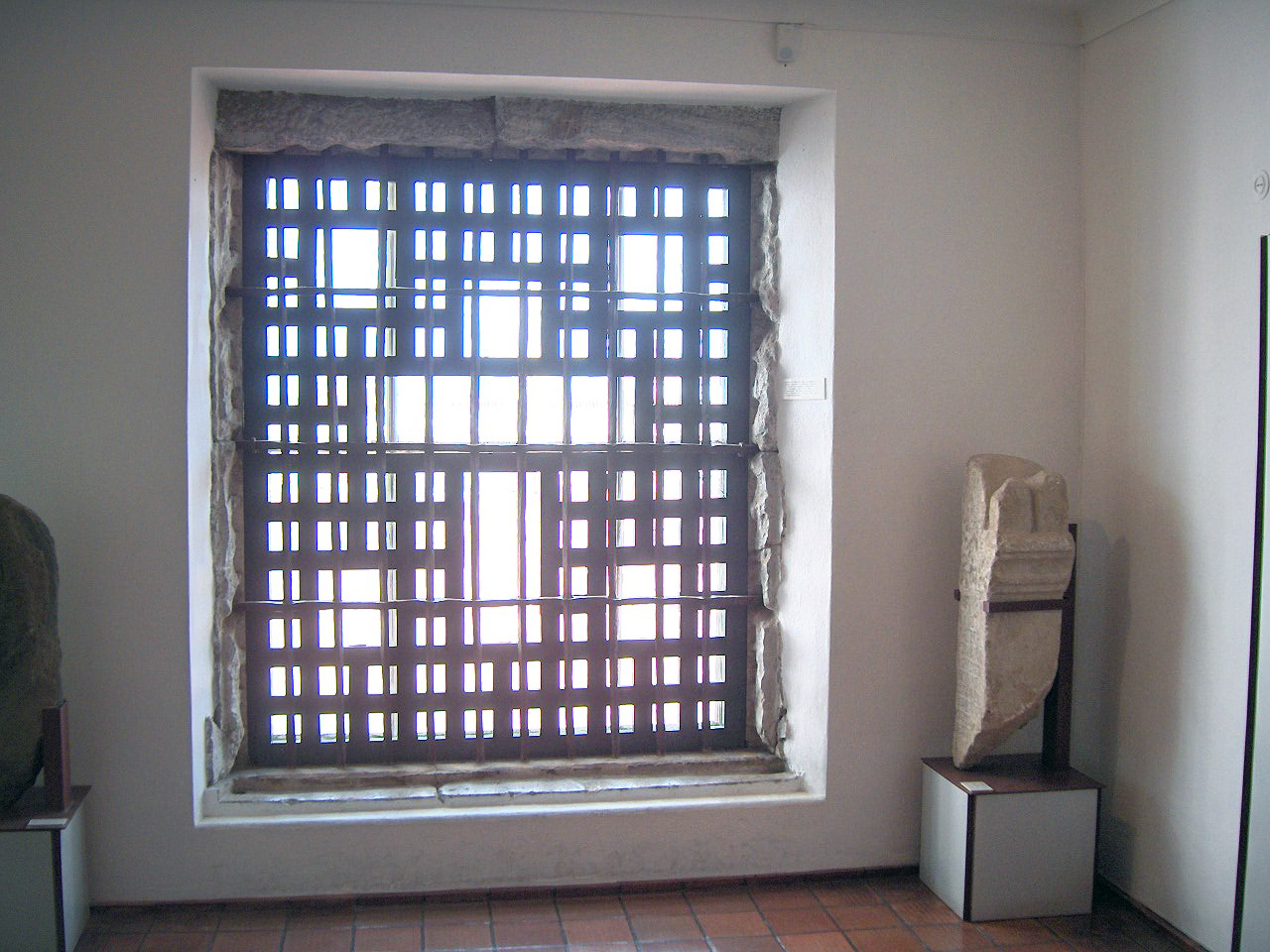
Replica of the window where the famous nun Mariana Alcoforado spoke with the Marquis of Chamilly

Starting in 910 there were successive attempts of conquest and reconquest by the Christian kings. With the collapse of the Umayyad Caliphate of Córdoba in 1031, Beja became a taifa, an independent Muslim-ruled principality. In 1144 the governor of Beja, Sidray ibn Wazir [pt], helped the rebellion of the Murīdūn (disciples) led by Abul-Qasim Ahmad ibn al-Husayn al-Quasi in the Algarve against power of Seville. In 1150 the town was captured by an army of the Almohads, who annexed it to their North African empire.

Simultaneously, with the definitive advance of Portugal (as well as other Christian kingdoms southward), Beja became a border town and therefore witnessed several incursions with the attempt to conquer it. It was first taken around 1158 or 1559, and later in 1162 by knights from Santarém led by Fernão Gonçalves, where it remained under Portuguese rule, entrusted to Gonçalo Mendes da Maia. In legend, as would later be written by Alexandre Herculano, it is said that he died in 1170 in a confrontation in Beja, although the veracity of this date is questioned seeing as the knight would be around 95 years of age at this time. In 1172, Geraldo Geraldes retook the town again from Muslim rule, and before departing from it the medieval Arab city was reduced to rubble and left desolate. A scarce 200 men and their families returned to the city rebuilding once more, but a mere six years later, when the Almohad caliph crossed the straits to Morocco in 1178, the Portuguese under Afonso I launched an expedition against the city. The entire population fled to Mértola thus bringing a temporary end to Muslim inhabitation of Beja. A definitive end to the Reconquista period in Beja came in the reign of Sancho II when the town was finally recaptured from the Moors, sometime between 1232 and 1234.

In 1254, Afonso III conceded the now garrison town of Beja its first charter, also marking the objective of its reconstruction as to recover its importance during this period. His son Denis would order construction at the castle, giving it the now recognisable main tower. Later, during the Dynasty of Aviz, Afonso V created the title of the Duke of Beja in 1453 for his younger brother, the Infante Ferdinand, and would later be given to whoever was the second son of the king.

As part of a larger scale reform of Portuguese local rule, Manuel I, who himself had been a duke of Beja, gave the city a new charter in 1510. The elevation of the settlement to the status of city happened soon after, although the exact date is open to interpretation as either April 1518, when the city received the distinction or 10 April 1521, when the king signed a royal letter concluding the national charter reforms and gave instructions to ensure their enforcement.

During the Portuguese Restoration War (1640–1667), it was attacked and occupied by the Portuguese and the Spanish armies Beja became the head of a diocese again in 1770, more than a thousand years after the fall of the Visigothic city. In 1808 Napoleonic troops under General Junot sacked the city and massacred the inhabitants.

=== Jewish history ===
Jews had already been living in Beja by the time the Kingdom of Portugal was established in the 12th century. Clauses regarding Jews are mentioned in the town's first charter. When the Jews were expelled from Portugal, Beja became a center for crypto-Judaism. The surname Beja was common among Sephardim living in other parts of Europe and the Middle East, presumably the descendants of those who were expelled, as it was common for Sephardic Jews to take on the surnames of the towns they were expelled from.

== Geography ==
=== Climate ===
Due to its southernmost inland location with the descending winds of the subtropics and low precipitation, especially in summer, the city has a hot-summer Mediterranean climate (Köppen: Csa). It is the hottest main city in Portugal and one of the hottest places in Europe during summer. Between 2001 and 2018 it had the hottest summer of any main city in the country. Winters are mild and moderately rainy, while summers are hot and dry.

The average high in January is around 14 °C (57 °F), while the July and August highs are around 33 °C (91 °F). However, in the last few years there has been an increase, to around 34-36 °C+. The July and August lows are around 16 °C (61 °F), while the January lows are around 5 °C (41 °F), occasionally dropping below 0 °C (32 °F) during the cold months, with an average of 9 days with frost per year. The annual mean temperature is around 17 °C (63 °F). The average total rainfall in a year is 540 mm (21 in).

Snow is rare but may fall about once per decade, the last major snowfall having happened on January 10, 2009. The year 2005 was particularly dry in Portugal and Beja suffered devastating forest fires in the surrounding rural areas contributing to the desertification that affects Alentejo.

Climate data for Beja (Santiago Maior), elevation: 246 m or 807 ft, 1991-2020 normals, 1981-present extremes
Month	Jan	Feb	Mar	Apr	May	Jun	Jul	Aug	Sep	Oct	Nov	Dec	Year
Record high °C (°F)	20.7 (69.3)	24.5 (76.1)	30.0 (86.0)	32.6 (90.7)	38.7 (101.7)	42.8 (109.0)	45.2 (113.4)	45.4 (113.7)	43.3 (109.9)	35.0 (95.0)	26.6 (79.9)	22.0 (71.6)	45.4 (113.7)
Mean daily maximum °C (°F)	14.1 (57.4)	15.7 (60.3)	18.9 (66.0)	21.1 (70.0)	25.3 (77.5)	30.2 (86.4)	33.5 (92.3)	33.4 (92.1)	29.3 (84.7)	23.9 (75.0)	17.9 (64.2)	14.8 (58.6)	23.2 (73.8)
Daily mean °C (°F)	9.9 (49.8)	10.9 (51.6)	13.4 (56.1)	15.1 (59.2)	18.5 (65.3)	22.2 (72.0)	24.7 (76.5)	25.0 (77.0)	22.3 (72.1)	18.5 (65.3)	13.6 (56.5)	10.8 (51.4)	17.1 (62.8)
Mean daily minimum °C (°F)	5.7 (42.3)	6.0 (42.8)	7.9 (46.2)	9.2 (48.6)	11.7 (53.1)	14.2 (57.6)	15.8 (60.4)	16.6 (61.9)	15.4 (59.7)	13.2 (55.8)	9.2 (48.6)	6.8 (44.2)	11.0 (51.8)
Record low °C (°F)	−2.7 (27.1)	−2.3 (27.9)	−3.2 (26.2)	1.8 (35.2)	3.5 (38.3)	7.6 (45.7)	8.7 (47.7)	10.8 (51.4)	7.5 (45.5)	3.4 (38.1)	0.4 (32.7)	−0.9 (30.4)	−3.2 (26.2)
Average precipitation mm (inches)	60.2 (2.37)	48.2 (1.90)	52.7 (2.07)	58.1 (2.29)	45.5 (1.79)	12.0 (0.47)	1.1 (0.04)	4.4 (0.17)	27.4 (1.08)	74.4 (2.93)	75.9 (2.99)	80.2 (3.16)	540.1 (21.26)
Average precipitation days (≥ 1.0 mm)	7.8	6.6	6.9	7.6	5.7	1.7	0.3	0.5	3.1	7.3	7.5	8.3	63.3
Mean monthly sunshine hours	160.9	158.8	216.4	244.5	287.5	338.4	373.3	338.6	261.3	206.1	177.2	149.0	2,866.9
Source 1: IPMA
Source 2: Météo Climat 1991-2020 (sunshine values) "Moyennes 1991/2020 Beja". Baseline climate means (1991–2020) from stations all over the world. Météo Climat.

Climate data for Beja (Santiago Maior), elevation: 247 m or 810 ft, 1961-1990 normals and extremes
Month	Jan	Feb	Mar	Apr	May	Jun	Jul	Aug	Sep	Oct	Nov	Dec	Year
Record high °C (°F)	22.0 (71.6)	24.1 (75.4)	28.8 (83.8)	29.8 (85.6)	36.7 (98.1)	43.3 (109.9)	42.7 (108.9)	41.4 (106.5)	42.0 (107.6)	34.3 (93.7)	28.1 (82.6)	21.2 (70.2)	43.3 (109.9)
Mean daily maximum °C (°F)	13.8 (56.8)	14.9 (58.8)	17.3 (63.1)	19.4 (66.9)	23.7 (74.7)	28.4 (83.1)	32.5 (90.5)	32.5 (90.5)	29.3 (84.7)	23.2 (73.8)	17.5 (63.5)	14.2 (57.6)	22.2 (72.0)
Daily mean °C (°F)	9.6 (49.3)	10.4 (50.7)	11.9 (53.4)	13.7 (56.7)	16.9 (62.4)	20.8 (69.4)	23.8 (74.8)	24.0 (75.2)	22.2 (72.0)	17.7 (63.9)	13.0 (55.4)	10.1 (50.2)	16.2 (61.1)
Mean daily minimum °C (°F)	5.4 (41.7)	5.9 (42.6)	6.6 (43.9)	7.9 (46.2)	10.1 (50.2)	13.2 (55.8)	15.1 (59.2)	15.4 (59.7)	15.1 (59.2)	12.3 (54.1)	8.5 (47.3)	6.0 (42.8)	10.1 (50.2)
Record low °C (°F)	−3.0 (26.6)	−4.0 (24.8)	−2.8 (27.0)	0.3 (32.5)	2.3 (36.1)	6.2 (43.2)	9.1 (48.4)	9.0 (48.2)	6.4 (43.5)	3.2 (37.8)	−0.5 (31.1)	−4.9 (23.2)	−4.9 (23.2)
Average precipitation mm (inches)	81.0 (3.19)	80.0 (3.15)	54.0 (2.13)	60.0 (2.36)	36.0 (1.42)	23.0 (0.91)	2.0 (0.08)	3.0 (0.12)	22.0 (0.87)	65.0 (2.56)	76.0 (2.99)	83.0 (3.27)	585 (23.05)
Average precipitation days (≥ 1.0 mm)	9.0	10.0	7.0	7.0	6.0	3.0	trace	1.0	2.0	6.0	8.0	9.0	68
Average relative humidity (%)	81	79	72	70	64	56	50	50	56	68	76	81	67
Mean monthly sunshine hours	148.0	147.0	195.0	219.0	282.0	298.0	357.0	336.0	245.0	199.0	158.0	142.0	2,726
Source: NOAA

=== Human geography ===
Map of the civil parishes of Beja, after the 2013 administrative reorganization

Administratively, the municipality is divided into 12 civil parishes (freguesias):

- Albernoa e Trindade
- Baleizão
- Beja (Salvador e Santa Maria da Feira)
- Beja (Santiago Maior e São João Baptista)
- Beringel
- Cabeça Gorda
- Nossa Senhora das Neves
- Salvada e Quintos
- Santa Clara de Louredo
- Santa Vitória e Mombeja
- São Matias
- Trigaches e São Brissos

==== International relations ====
Beja is twinned with:

- Béja, Tunisia (1993)

== Architecture ==
=== Castle ===
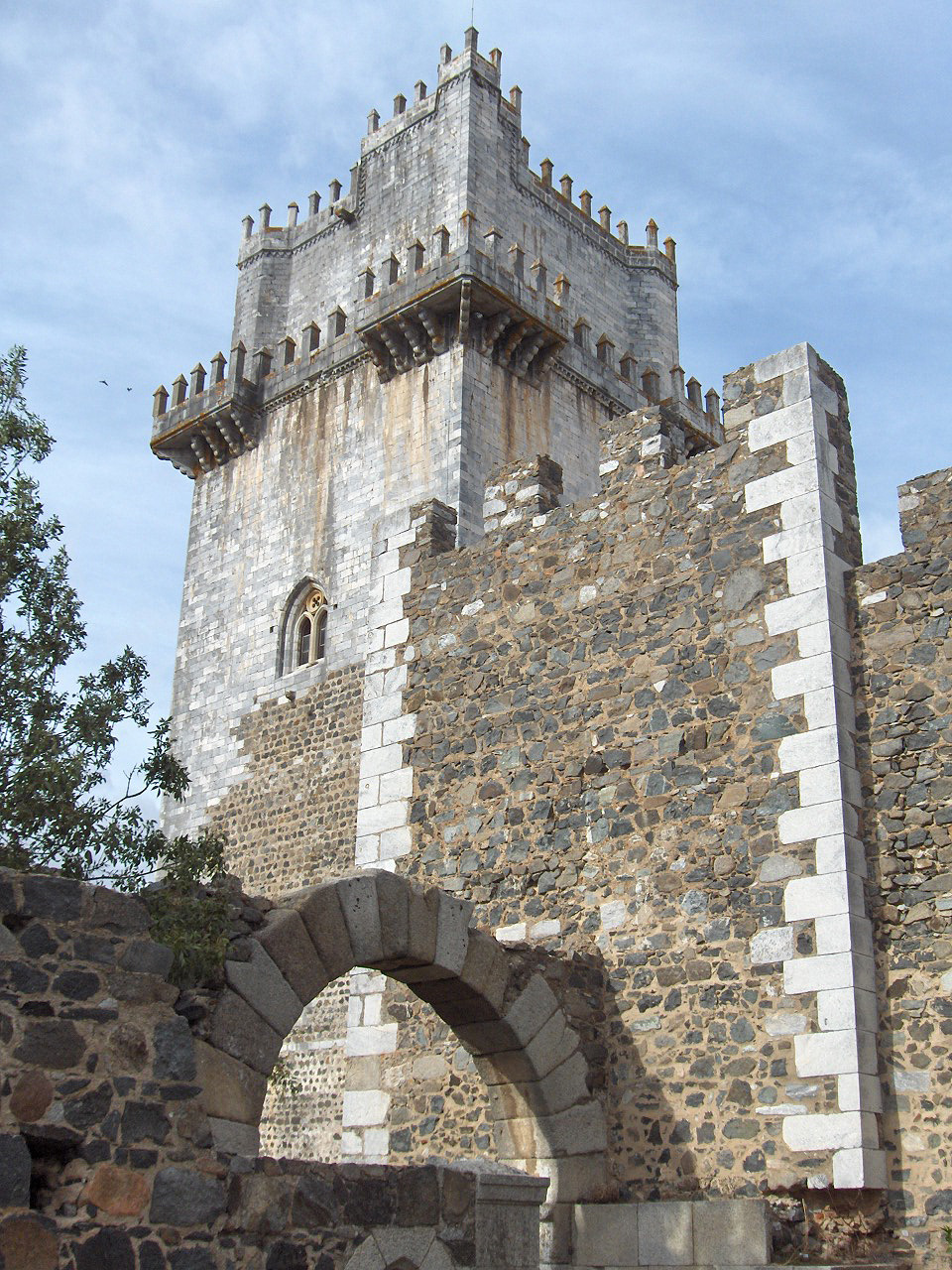
The 14th-century castle keep

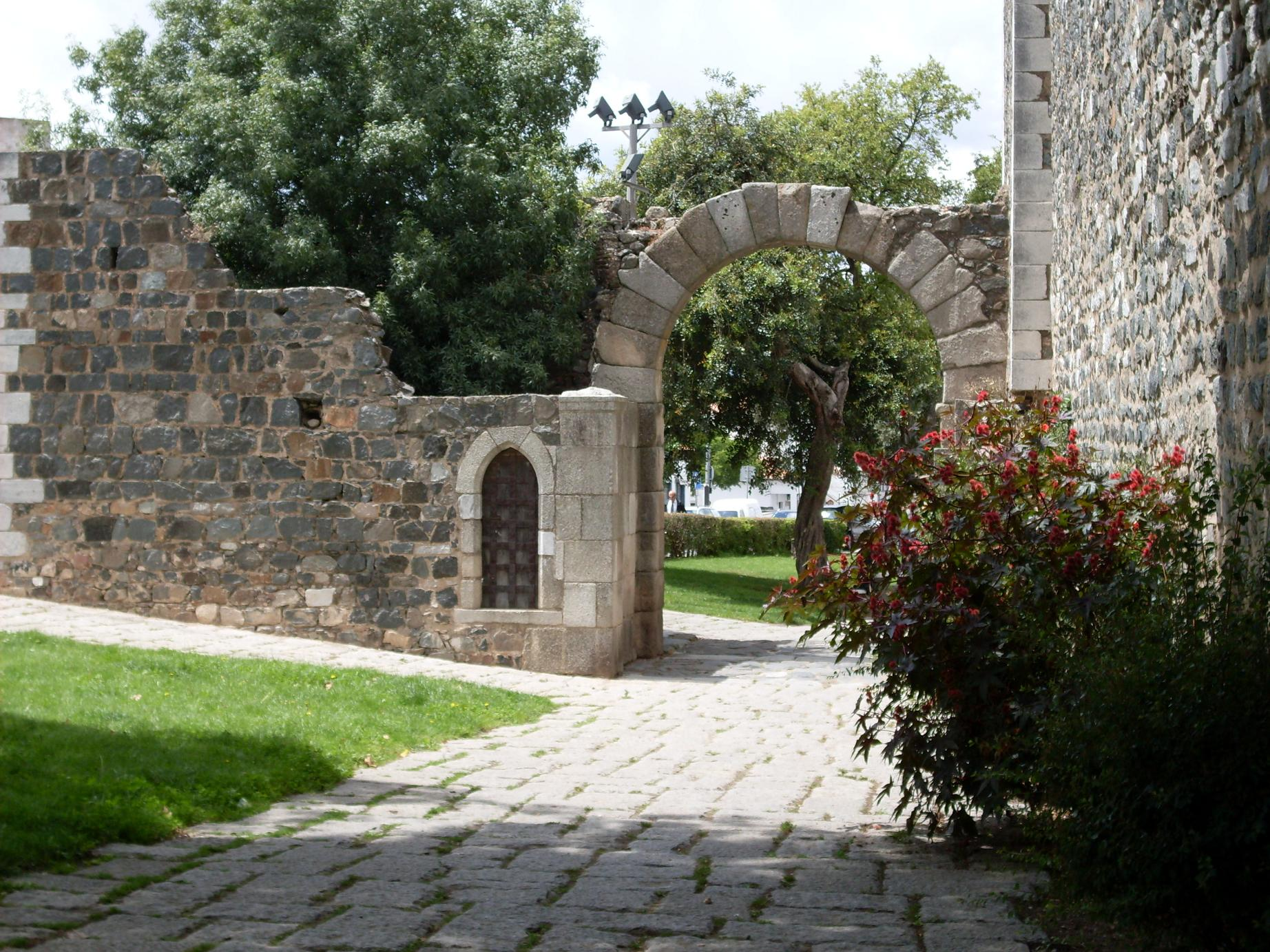
Roman Arch

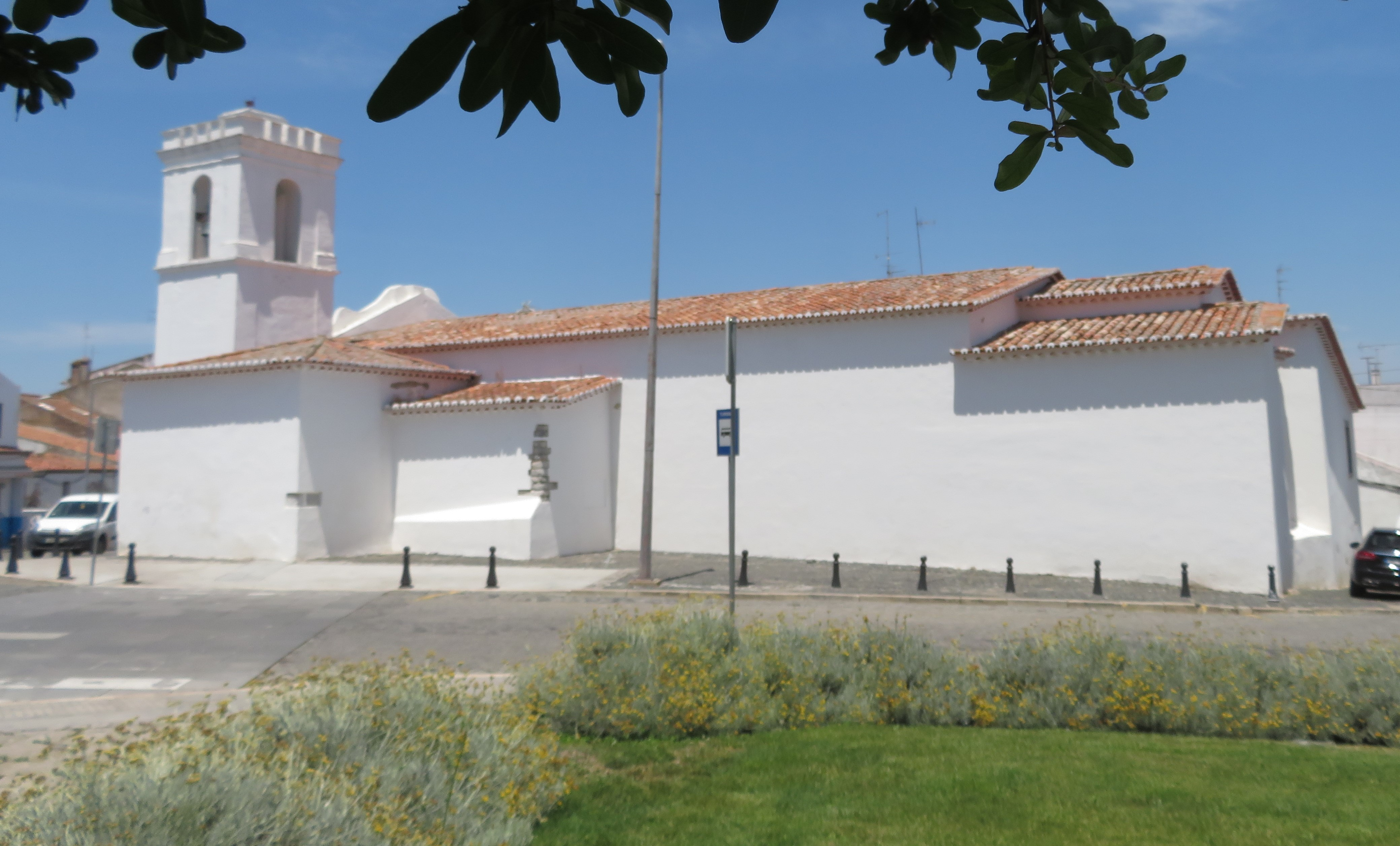
The church of Saint Amaro houses the visigothic museum.

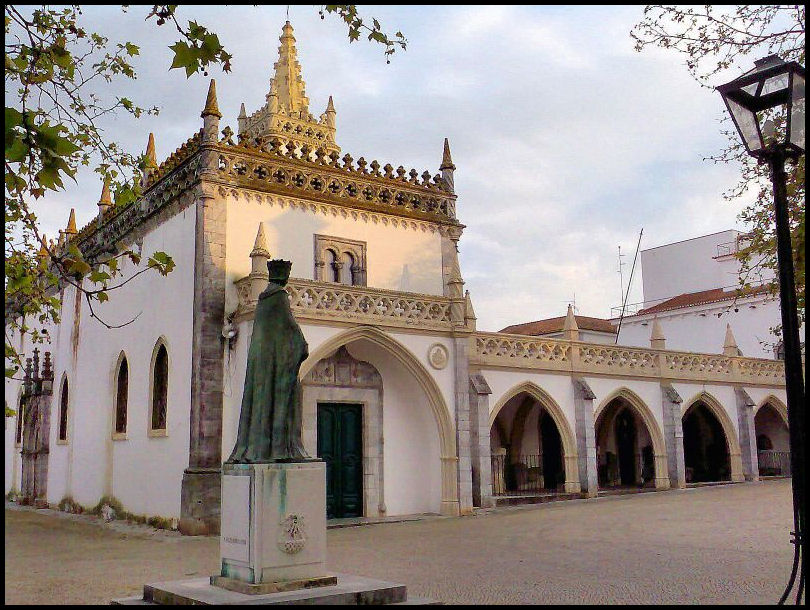
Main façade of the Regional Museum

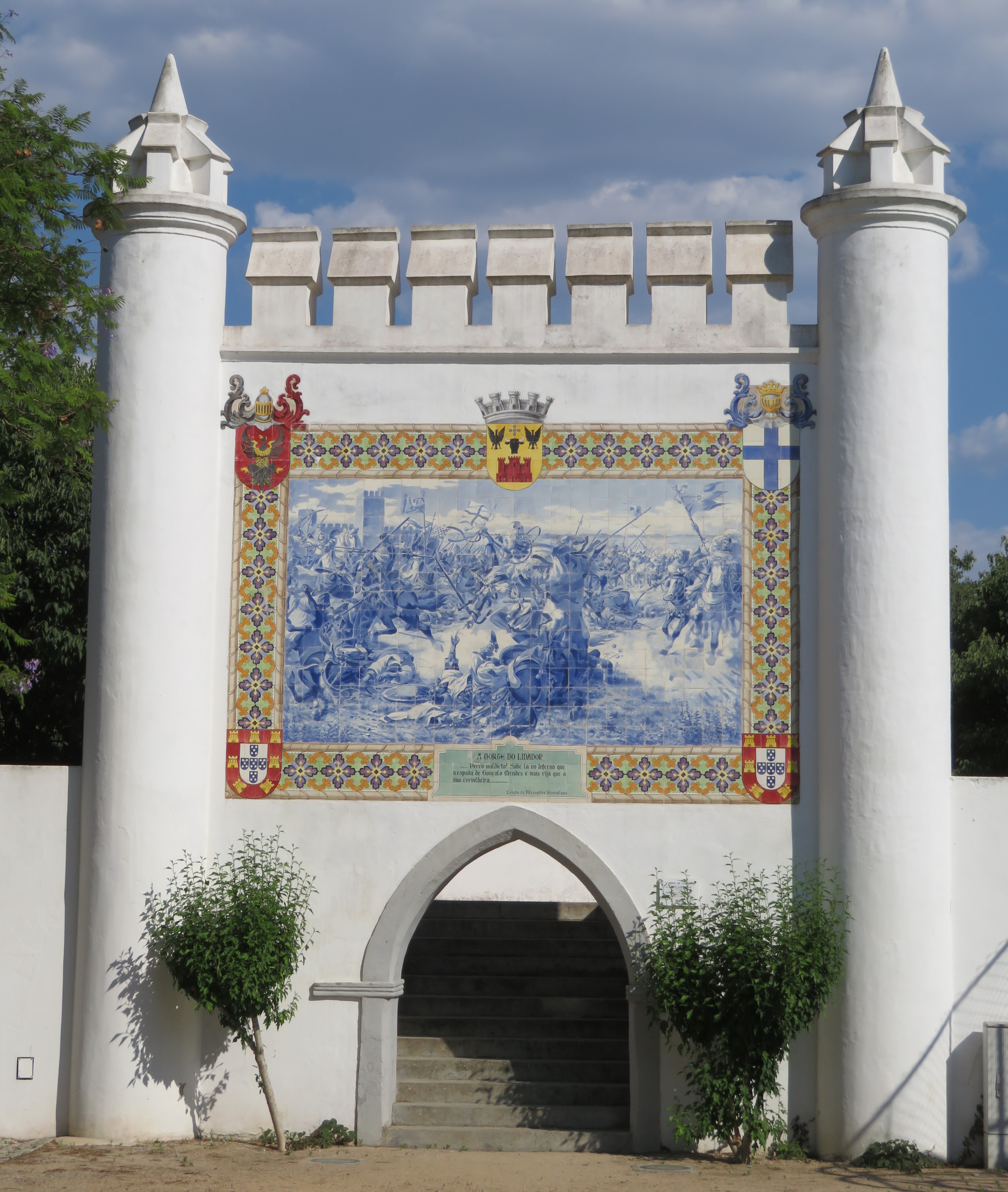
Entrance gate of the Jardim Gago Coutinho e Sacadura Cabral depicting the legendary death of Gonçalo Mendes da Maia

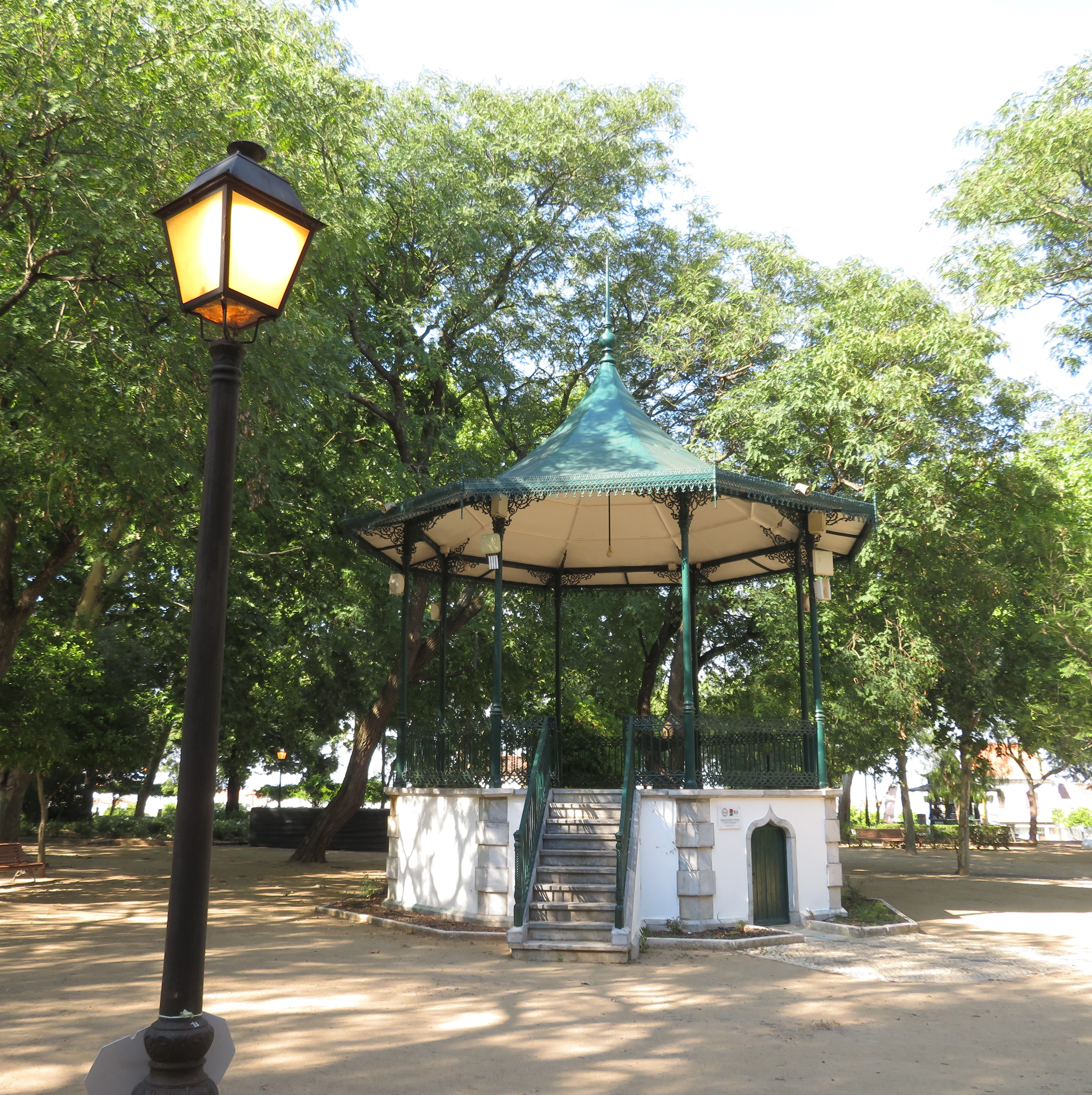
Bandstand in Jardim Gago Coutinho e Sacadura Cabral

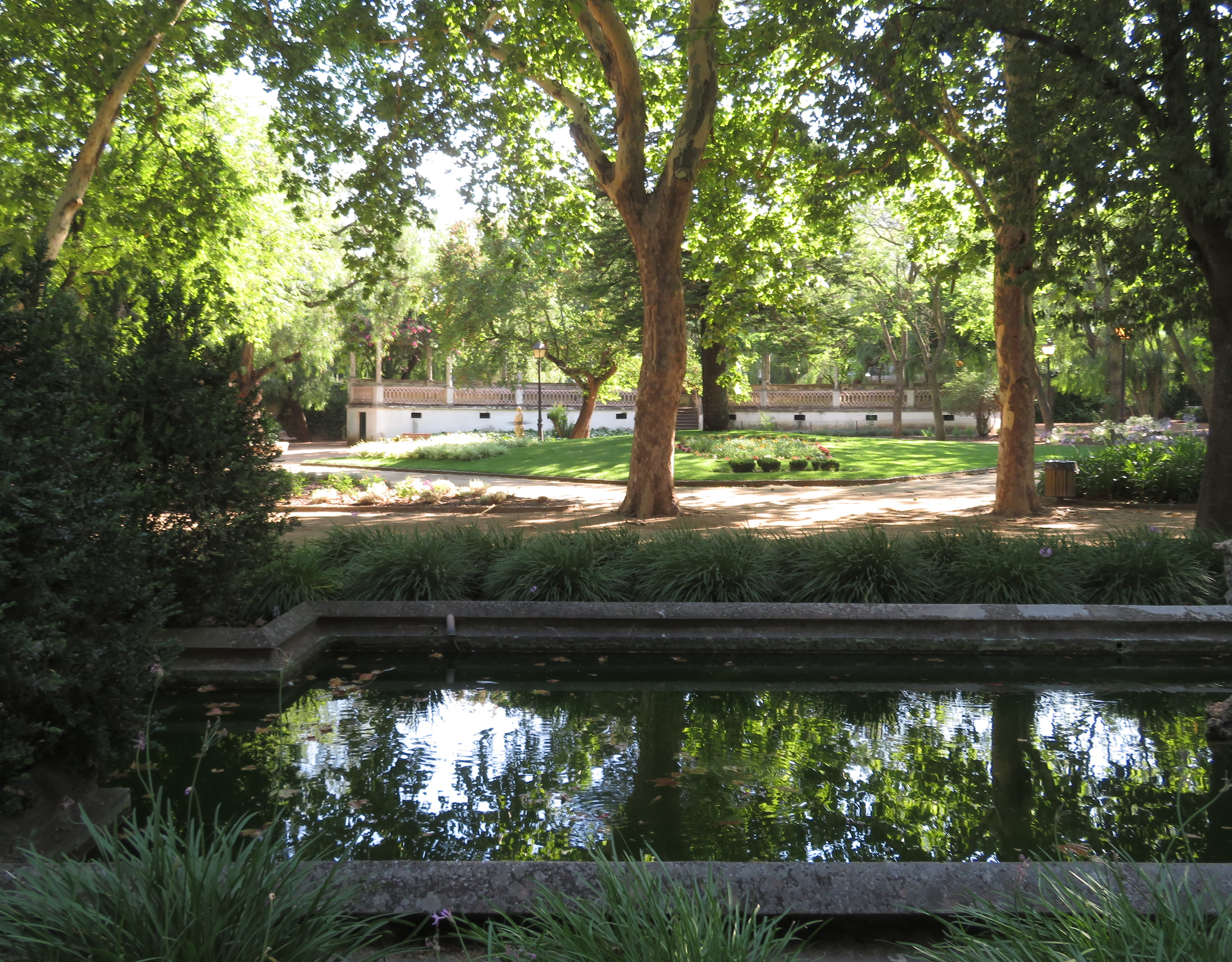
Pergola in Jardim Gago Coutinho e Sacadura Cabral

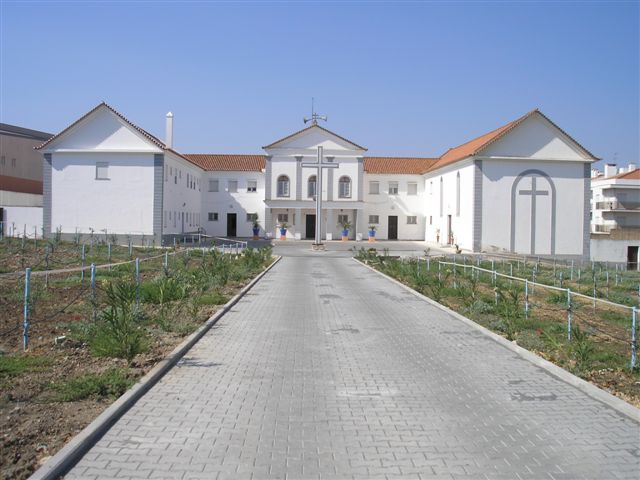
The Carmelite convent of Beja

The Castle of Beja on top of the hill can be seen from afar and dominates the town. It was built, together with the town walls, under the reign of King Diniz in the 13th century over the remains of a Roman castellum that had been fortified by the Moors. It consists of battlement walls with four square corner towers and a central granite and marble keep (Torre de Menagem), with its height of 40 m the highest in Portugal. The top of the keep can be accessed via a spiral staircase with 197 steps, passing three stellar-vaulted rooms with Gothic windows. The merlons of the machicolation around the keep are topped with small pyramids. Standing on the battlements, one has a sensational panorama of the surrounding landscape. One can also glimpse the remains of the city walls that once had forty turrets and five gates. The castle now houses a small military museum.

The square in front of the castle is named after Gonçalo Mendes da Maia or O Lidador, a brave knight killed in the battle against the Moors in 1170.

=== Visigothic Museum ===
The whitewashed Latin-Visigothic church of Santo Amaro, dedicated to Saint Amaro, standing next to the castle, is one of just four pre-Romanesque churches left in Portugal. Some parts date from the 6th century and the interior columns and capitals are carved with foliages and geometric designs from the 7th century. Especially the column with birds attacking a snake is of particular note. It houses today a small archaeological museum with Visigothic art.

=== Queen Leonor Museum ===
The Museum of Queen Eleanor regional museum was set up in 1927 and 1928 in the former Convent of Our Lady of the Conception (Convento de Nossa Senhora da Conceição) of the Order of Poor Ladies (dissolved in 1834), gradually expanding its collection. This Franciscan convent had been established in 1459 by Infante Fernando, Duke of Viseu and duke of Beja, next to his ducal palace. The construction continued until 1509.

It is an impressive building with a late-Gothic lattice-worked architrave running along the building. This elegant architrave resembles somewhat the architrave of the Monastery of Batalha, even if there are some early-Manueline influences. Above the entrance porch on the western façade is an ajimez window (a mullioned window) in Manueline and Moorish style in the room of the abbess, originating from the demolished palace of the dukes of Beja. The entrance door is embedded under an ogee arch. A square bell-tower and a spire with crockets tower above the complex. The convent has been classified as a national monument.

The entrance hall leads to the sumptuously gilded Baroque chapel, consisting of a single nave under a semi-circular vault. Three altars (one of the 17th century, dedicated to St. John the Evangelist, and two of the 18th century, dedicated to St. Christopher and St. Bento) are decorated with gilded woodwork (talha dourada). The fourth altar, dedicated to St. John the Baptist, was decorated with Florentine mosaics by José Ramalho in 1695.

On the wall are three religious azulejos dating from 1741, depicting scenes from the life of St. John the Baptist.

The refectory and the claustro are decorated with exquisite azulejos, some dating from Moorish times, others from the 16th to the 18th centuries.

One enters the chapter house through a Manueline portal from the quadra of St. John the Evangelist. The ribbed vault of this square room was distempered during the renovations of 1727. The walls are covered with Arab-Hispanic azulejos with geometric and vegetal designs that are among the most important ceramic decorations in Portugal. Above the azulejos are some semicircular distempered paintings with religious themes: St. John the Baptist, St. John the Evangelist, St. Christopher, St. Clare and St. Francis of Assisi.

The museum houses also an important collection of Flemish, Spanish and Portuguese paintings from the 15th to the 18th centuries, among them:

- Flemish paintings: Virgin with Milk; Flemish School (c. 1530) and "Christ and His Apostles" (16th century)
- Portuguese paintings: Ecce Homo (15th century), "St. Vincent by Vicente Gil and Manuel Vicente (16th century), "Virgin with the Rose" by Francisco Campos (16th century), "Mass of St. Gregory" probably by Gregório Lopes (16th century), "Annunciation" (16th century) and four paintings by António Nogueira (16th century), "Last Supper" by Pedro Alexandrino (17th century).
- Spanish paintings: St. Augustine, St. Jerome and "Martyrdom of St. Bartholomew" by José de Ribera (Spanish, 17th century), Head of Saint John the Baptist (Spanish School, 17th century)

The museum houses also the funeral monuments in late-Gothic style of the first abbess D. Uganda and of the Infante Fernando, Duke of Viseu and his wife Beatriz of Portugal.

The archaeological collection of Fernando Nunes Ribeiro, donated to museum in 1987 after forty years of archaeological research, is on display on the upper floors: Visigothic and Roman artefacts, gravestones from the Bronze Age with antique writings of the Iberians and steles from the Iron Age.

Among the several other artefacts in its collection, the museum possesses the Escudela de Pero de Faria, a unique piece of Chinese porcelain from 1541.

== Museums and monuments ==
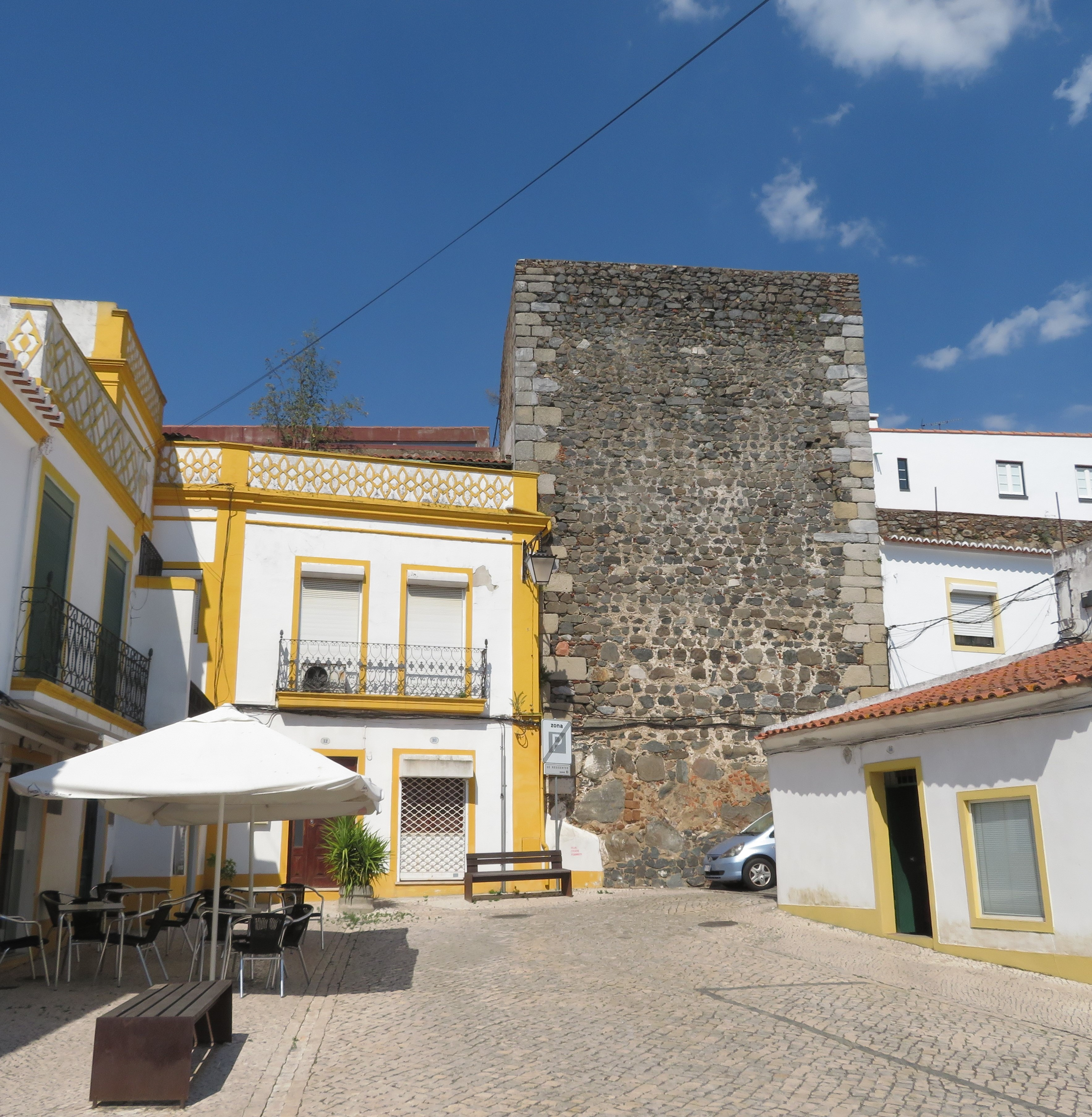
The mediaeval city's Aljustrel Gate.

- Castle of Beja
- Medieval city wall with various gates, e.g. Porta de Mértola, Porta de Aljustrel
- Queen Leonor Museum, formerly known as the Regional Museum of Beja, housed in the Convent of Beja
- Museological Core of Rua do Sembrano
- Visigotic Core of the Regional Museum (housed in the Church of Santo Amaro)
- Old Stone Pillory
- Roman ruins of Pisões
- Jorge Vieira's Art Museum

== Historical churches ==
- Cathedral of St. James the Great (Beja Cathedral or See) (Igreja de Santiago Maior ou Sé-Catedral de Beja)
- Church of Saint Amaro / Visigothic Core of the Regional Museum of Beja
- Church of Mercy (Igreja da Misericórdia)
- Church of Santa Maria da Feira (originally built as a mosque)
- Church of Our Lady of Carmo (Igreja de Nossa Senhora do Carmo)
- Convent of Our Lady of Conception (Convent of Beja) / Regional Museum
- Church of Our Lady at the Foot of the Cross (Igreja de Nossa Senhora do Pé da Cruz)
- Church of Our Lady of Peace (Igreja de Nossa Senhora da Paz)
- Church of Our Lady of Pleasures (Igreja de Nossa Senhora dos Prazeres)
- Church of the Savior (Igreja do Salvador)
- Convent of Saint Anthony
- Convent of Saint Francis (Convento de São Francisco, presently a historical hotel or Pousada)
- Hermitage of Saint Andrew (Ermida de Santo André)
- Hermitage of Saint Sebastian (Ermida de São Sebastião)
- St. Stephen's Chapel

== Urban green spaces ==
- Jardim Gago Coutinho e Sacadura Cabral is a well-kept public park in the centre with several monuments, fountains, a pergola and a pavilion. The park is named after two pilots, Sacadura Cabral and Gago Coutinho, who were the first to cross the Southern Atlantic by plane in 1922. A large and sightworthy painting consisting of tiles can be seen on the entrance gate.
- Jardim do Bacalhau
- Jardim do Castelo
- Jardim do Tribunal
- Mata da Cidade, also known as Parque de Merendas da Cidade de Beja (Picnic Park)
- Parque da Cidade

== Economy ==
Known as the breadbasket of Portugal, the region's agriculture is a mainstay of the local economy. It produces wheat, wine and olives. Tourism is important due to sunny weather, a long history and many cultural attractions including a 13th-century castle and a number of museums.

== Infrastructure ==
=== Transport ===
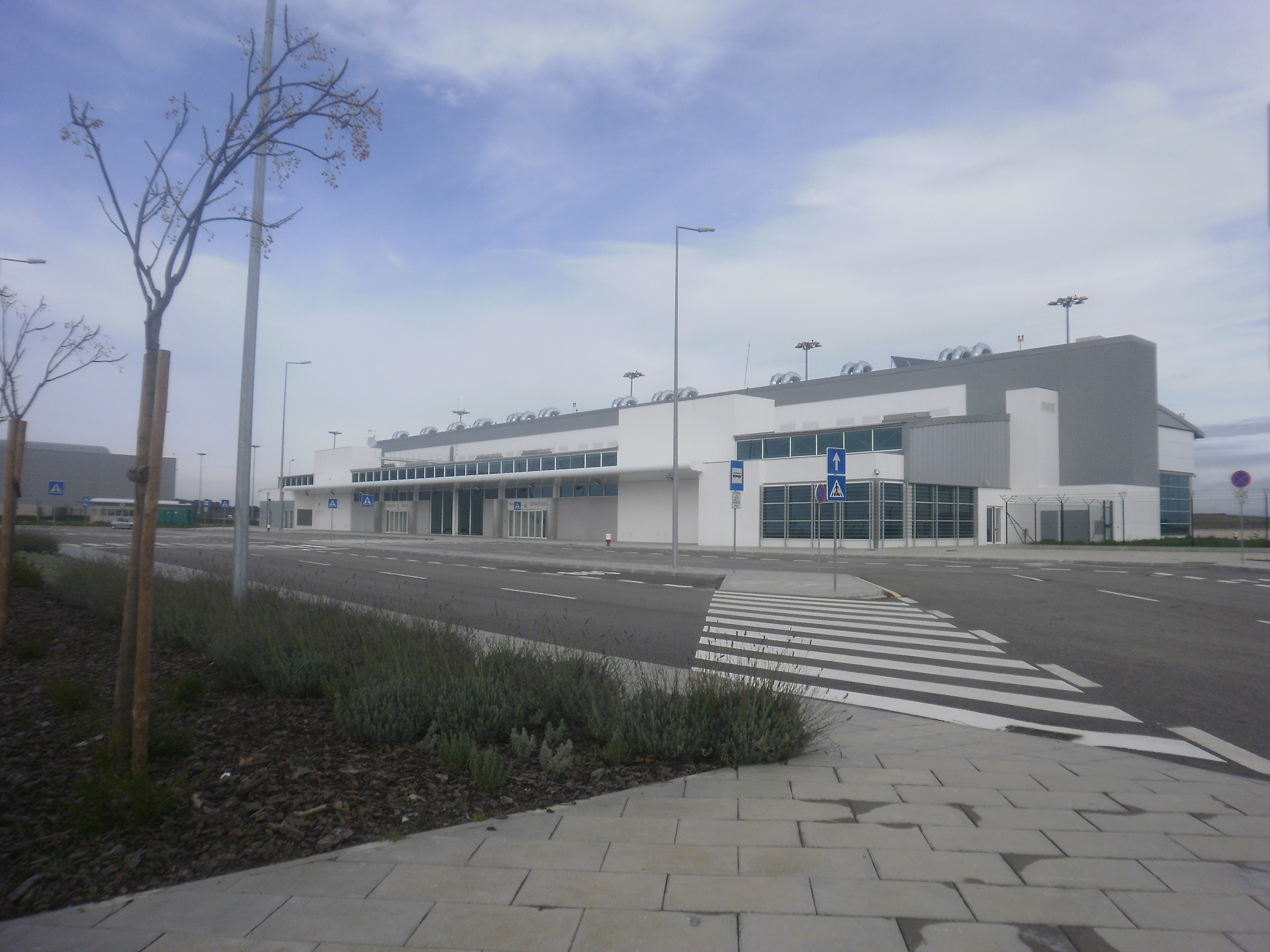
The Beja Airport building in São Brissos, before opening in April 2011

Beja has one of four international airports in mainland Portugal, opened in 2011. Located 9 kilometres (5.6 mi) from the city in São Brissos, Beja Airport was constructed using infrastructure from the already existing military airport of Beja. Conceived as a key point in a "regional development triangle" consisting of Beja, Sines and Alqueva, its intermediate distance between Lisbon and the Algarve also envisioned it as a potential alternative base for the popular destinations, but it has since received criticism of being a "white elephant" due to a lack of use - as of mid-2026, no regular passenger services operate to or from Beja. Formerly, the Portuguese wet lease airline Hi Fly operated its Airbus A380, purchased second-hand in 2018, from Beja, as well as other airplanes of its fleet. A smaller, second air strip exists bout 3 km (1.9 mi) east of the São Brissos base which functions as the Municipal Aerodrome of Beja.

Located in the southern interior, Beja's terrestrial links are developed albeit relatively more isolated than that of other district capitals, being one of two district capitals (alongside Portalegre) to not be on the national motorway network. The IP8 highway (which here runs concurrent to the EN259 and EN260 roads), passes through Beja and connects the deepwater port city of Sines about 60 kilometres (37 mi) away Sines to the Spanish border at Vila Verde de Ficalho (Serpa). This road was intended to in large part be superseded by the A26 motorway, but due to the financial crisis, its construction was suspended in the late 2000s. Beja is at the crossroads of the IP8 with the IP2, the interior's highway, which travels from the north-eastern border town of Portelo (Bragança) to the Algarve, via Guarda, Évora and Castro Verde. The national road network from Beja also includes the southwesterly EN18 road toward the mining town of Aljustrel, meeting the notable EN2 at Ervidel and a road south-east, EN122 toward Vila Real de Santo António, via Mértola. The latter was planned to be served by a parallel road, an extension of the IC27 up to Beja, running parallel to it.

The city is on the railway network with Beja railway station, within the city, being the current terminus of the Linha do Alentejo railway line. It previously ran, until 2011, south to Funcheira (Ourique), where it connected with the Southern Line for services toward Faro.

== Education ==
=== Higher education ===
- Polytechnic University of Beja

=== Schools ===
- EB 2,3 Santiago Maior School
- EB 2,3 Mário Beirão School
- EB 2,3 Santa Maria School
- D. Manuel I - High School
- Diogo Gouveia - High School
- Regional Music Conservatory of Baixo Alentejo

== Culture ==
=== Cultural places ===
Located in the Largo de São João, the Pax Julia Theatre is the city's main performance venue. To its right are the untitled sculptures by Noémia Cruz

- Beja Public Library
- Pax Julia Theatre
- Casa da Culture (meaning House of Culture)

=== Events ===
- Ovibeja
- Patrimónios do Sul
- Beja Romana (historical recreation from Roman times)
- International Comics Festival
- Palavras Andarilhas

== Notable citizens ==
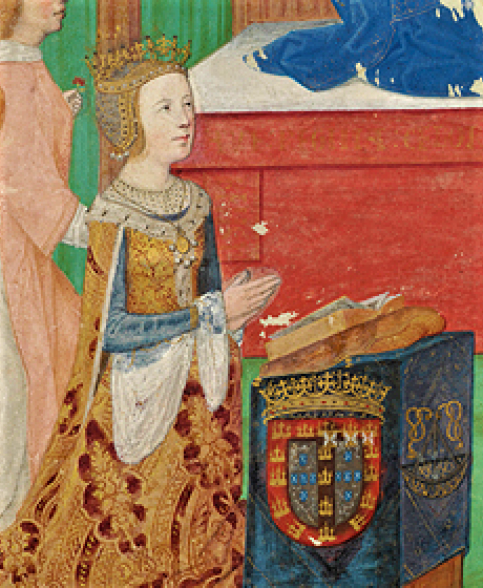
Eleanor of Portugal, ca. 1500

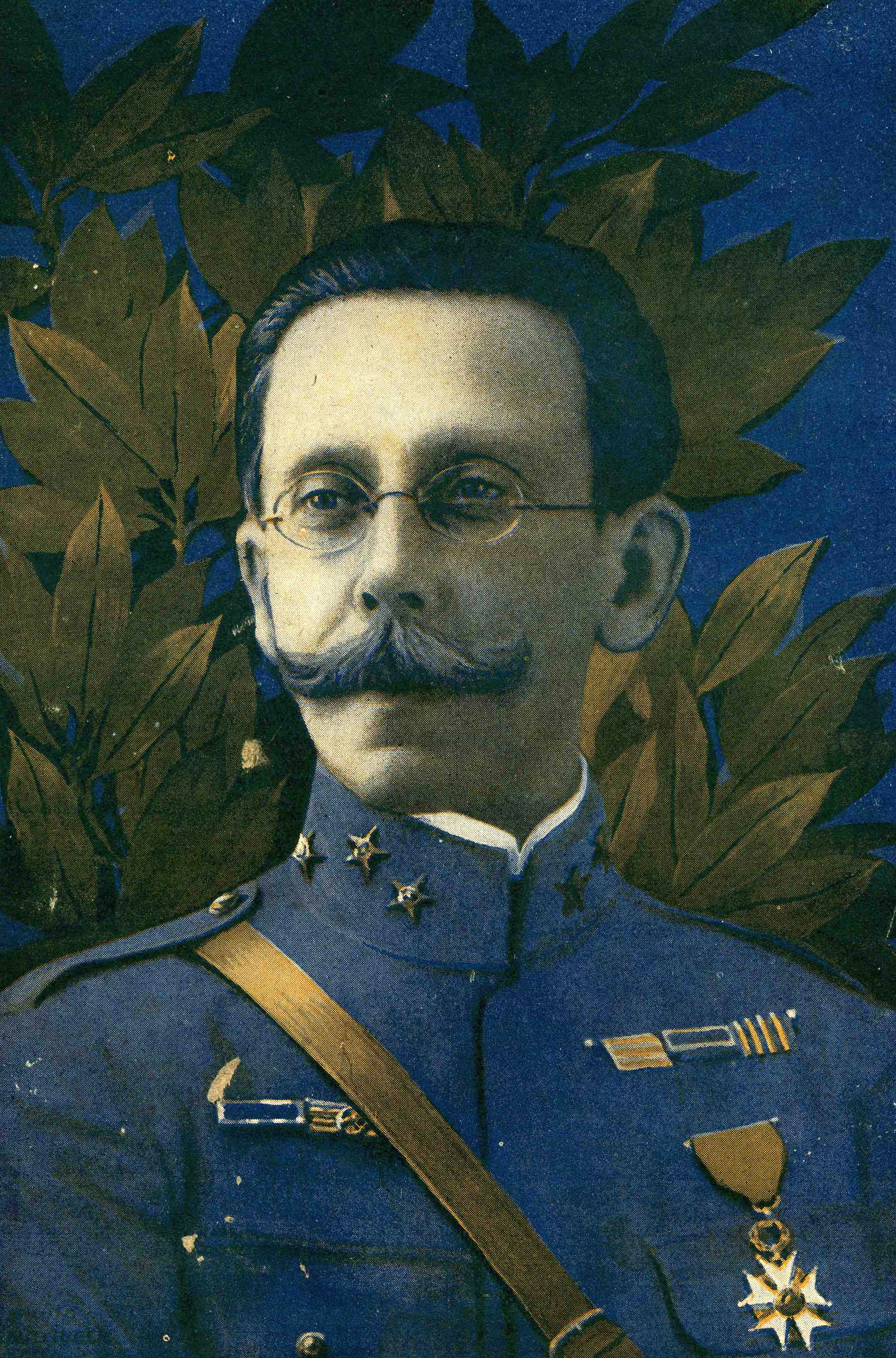
Tomás António Garcia Rosado, ca. 1918

- Apringius (7th c.), known as Saint Apringius of Beja, bishop and church father
- Abu al-Walid al-Baji (c. 1013–c.1081), goldsmith and Maliki scholar
- Al-Mu'tamid ibn Abbad (1040–1095), third and last ruler of the taifa of Seville in Al-Andalus
- Atto of Pistoia (c.1070-1153), known as Saint Atto, bishop and historiographer
- Gonçalo Mendes da Maia (1079–1170), knight in the service of Afonso Henriques, responsible for the border defence of Beja
- Queen Eleanor of Viseu (1458–1525), infanta (princess) and later queen consort of Portugal
- Diogo de Gouveia (c.1471-1557), teacher, theologian, diplomat and humanist during the Renaissance
- André de Gouveia (1497–1548), humanist and pedagogue during the Renaissance
- António de Gouveia (c.1505–1566), humanist and educator during the Renaissance
- Antonio de Gouvea (1575-1628), bishop, diplomat and Spanish ambassador to Safavid Iran
- Mariana Alcoforado (1640–1723), nun who wrote the Letters of a Portuguese Nun
- José Agostinho de Macedo (1761–1831), Portuguese poet and prose writer
- Tomás Garcia Rosado (1854–1937), infantry officer, general of the Portuguese Army, governor of Mozambique, 1902-1905 and Ambassador to the United Kingdom, 1926–1934
- António Maria Baptista (1866–1920), military officer and politician, President of the Ministry in 1920
- Deolinda Lopes Vieira (1888–1993), teacher, anarcho-syndicalist activist and feminist
- Mário Beirão [pt] (1890–1965), Portuguese poet
- Francisco Miguel Duarte (1908-1988), known as "Chico Sapateiro", writer and politician
- Maria Lucília Estanco Louro (1922–2018), teacher, pacifist and opponent of the Estado Novo regime
- Catarina Eufémia (1928–1954), harvester and political murder victim in Beja
- Linda de Suza (born 1948), singer, actress and best-selling author
- Tonicha (born 1946), a pop-folk singer, represented Portugal at the 1971 Eurovision Song Contest
- Cândida Branca Flor (1949–2001), entertainer and traditional singer
- Maria da Graça Carvalho (born 1955), politician and minister in several governments.
- António Serrano (born 1965), professor, businessman and minister of the XVIII Constitutional Government
- Carlos Moedas (born 1970), politician, former European commissioner and current Mayor of Lisbon
- António Zambujo (born 1975), singer-songwriter

=== Sport ===
- Alfredo Valadas (1912-1990), Portuguese football international
- Fernando Mamede (1951-2026), long-distance running specialist
- Quim (born 1967), real name Joaquim Serafim, one-club footballer for Vitória F.C.
- Pedro Caixinha (born 1970), football manager
- Manuel Damião (born 1978), middle- and long-distance runner
- Ana Cabecinha (born 1984), middle- and long-distance runner and race-walker
- João Aurélio (born 1988), professional footballer with over 300 club caps
