= Santa Clara de Louredo =

- Civil parish
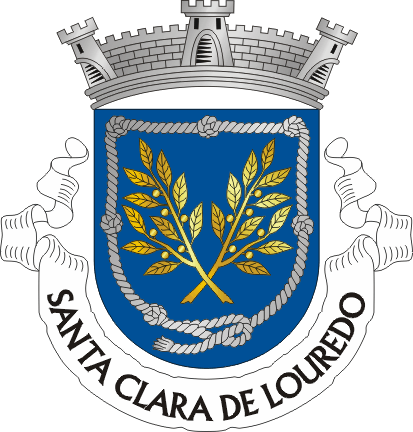
- Coat of arms

- Location in Portugal
- Coordinates: 37.972°N 7.872°W
- Country: Portugal
- Region: Alentejo
- Intermunic. comm.: Baixo Alentejo
- District: Beja
- Municipality: Beja

Area
  - Total: 71.88 km^{2} (27.75 sq mi)

Population (2011)
  - Total: 864
  - Density: 12/km^{2} (31/sq mi)
- Time zone: UTC+00:00 (WET)
  - Summer (DST): UTC+01:00 (WEST)

Santa Clara de Louredo is a parish of the municipality of Beja, in southeast Portugal. The population in 2011 was 864, in an area of 71.88 km^{2}.
