= São Matias (Beja) =

- Civil parish
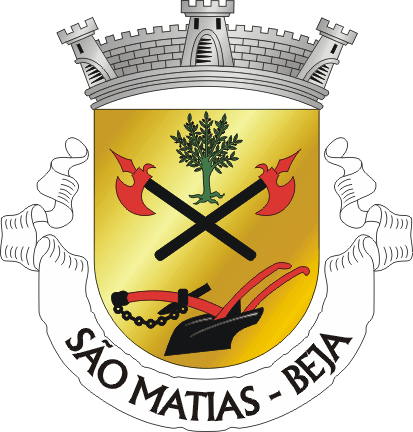
- Coat of arms

- Location in Portugal
- Coordinates: 38.109°N 7.857°W
- Country: Portugal
- Region: Alentejo
- Intermunic. comm.: Baixo Alentejo
- District: Beja
- Municipality: Beja

Area
  - Total: 70.23 km^{2} (27.12 sq mi)

Population (2011)
  - Total: 569
  - Density: 8.1/km^{2} (21/sq mi)
- Time zone: UTC+00:00 (WET)
  - Summer (DST): UTC+01:00 (WEST)

São Matias is a parish of Beja Municipality, in southeast Portugal. The population in 2021 was 511, in an area of 70.23 km^{2}.
