= Salvada e Quintos =

- Civil parish
- Location in Portugal
- Coordinates: 37.935°N 7.774°W
- Country: Portugal
- Region: Alentejo
- Intermunic. comm.: Baixo Alentejo
- District: Beja
- Municipality: Beja

Area
  - Total: 199.72 km^{2} (77.11 sq mi)

Population (2011)
  - Total: 1,352
  - Density: 6.8/km^{2} (18/sq mi)
- Time zone: UTC+00:00 (WET)
  - Summer (DST): UTC+01:00 (WEST)

Salvada e Quintos is a civil parish (Freguesia) in the municipality of Beja, Portugal.

It was formed in 2013 by the merger of the former parishes Salvada and Quintos. The population in 2011 was 1,352, in an area of 199.72 km^{2}.
