= History of the Portuguese Communist Party =

The history of the Portuguese Communist Party (Portuguese: Partido Comunista Português, pronounced [pɐɾˈtiðu kumuˈniʃtɐ puɾtuˈɣeʃ], or PCP), spans a period of 104–105 years, from its foundation in 1921 as the Portuguese section of the Communist International (Comintern) to the present. The Party is still an active force within Portuguese society.

After its foundation, the party experienced little time as a legal party before it was forced underground after a military coup in 1926. After some years of internal re-organization, that adapted the PCP to its new clandestine condition and enlarged its base of support, the party became a force in the opposition to the dictatorial regime led by António de Oliveira Salazar, despite being brutally suppressed several times during the 48 years of resistance and having spent several years with little connection with the Comintern and the World Communist Movement.

After the end of the dictatorship, with the Carnation Revolution in 1974, the party became a major political force within the new democratic regime. Despite being less influential since the fall of the Socialist bloc in eastern Europe, it still enjoys popularity in vast sectors of Portuguese society, particularly in the rural areas of the Alentejo and Ribatejo, and also in the heavily industrialized areas around Lisbon and Setúbal, where it holds the leadership of some municipalities.

== Party's origins and formation (1919–1926) ==
=== Portuguese Maximalist Federation ===
At the end of World War I, in 1918, Portugal fell into a serious economic crisis, in part due to the Portuguese military intervention in the war. The Portuguese working classes responded to the deterioration in their living standards with a wave of strikes. Supported by an emerging labour movement, the workers achieved some of their objectives, such as an eight-hour working day.

In September 1919, the revolutionary syndicalists of the more radical sectors of the labour movement founded the Portuguese Maximalist Federation. Two years before, the October revolution had occurred, which led to the creation of the Russian Soviet Federative Socialist Republic. The worsening of the living conditions potentiated the amplification and radicalization of the social movement, and in the same year, the General Confederation of Labour was constituted. In this Federation, inspired by the Bolshevik revolution, there were those who did not conform to the impasses and limitations of the traditional trade union action. They sought to follow the example of the Bolshevik revolution, proclaiming through the insurrectional path and working towards its repetition. The designation "maximalist" was chosen because: "After a broad debate the conclusion that Bolshevism meant 'revolution taken to the max' was reached". The goal of FMP was to promote socialist and revolutionary ideas and to organize and develop the worker movement. The FMP started publishing the weekly Bandeira Vermelha (Red Flag) which became a popular newspaper among the Portuguese working classes.

Unlike other communist parties, PCP was not formed after a split of a Social Democratic or Socialist Party, but from the ranks of anarcho-syndicalism and revolutionary syndicalism. The Party opened its first headquarters in the Arco do Marquês do Alegrete Street in Lisbon. In the same year, 1921, it also opened the Communist Centers of Porto, Évora, and Beja. Seven months after its creation, the first issue of O Comunista (The Communist), the first newspaper of the party, was published.

The first congress of the party took place in Lisbon in November 1923, with Carlos Rates leading the party. The theses of the congress had previously been published in O Comunista and discussed by all the local organizations. The congress was attended by about a hundred members of the party and asserted its solidarity with Socialism in the Soviet Union and the need for a strong struggle for similar policies in Portugal.

The ideological consistency of its leaders was low, inheriting what they had from their syndicalist origins, still far from freeing it to embrace the doctrine and dominant conceptions of Lenin's Party. Despite this, another centre opened in the Portuguese workers' movement, claiming that the syndicalist organization, in itself, was insufficient in a new social order. However, the organization wasn't able to survive the impact of the arrest of their main driving force, Manuel Ribeiro, at the end of 1920. The articles that he published in the maximalist newspaper "Red Flag" (Bandeira Vermelha), about the governmental behavior in the strike of the railway workers where he ended up arrested, or the "cold dread that the government felt because of the propaganda of the triumphant revolution in Russia", led to the ban of the Maximalist Federation.

=== Foundation of the Portuguese Communist Party ===
However, after three months the Portuguese Communist Party would be founded, continuing with the group of people that in the disarticulation of the Maximalist Federation demeaned the need of a communist congress. The PCP was founded on the 6 of March 1921. Shortly after the Party's foundation, the Communist Youth was created, that immediately established contact with the Young Communist International.

The third of the provisional organic Basis states that:

The supreme goal that the Portuguese Communist Party will seek to make in a revolutionary action, that the circumstances of the European and national means make timely, is the full socialization of the means of production, circulation and consumption, this means, the radical transformation of capitalist society into a communist society.

The historian João Madeira considers that in the document remained "a set of confusing and not very clear references, or that collided with the doctrine in which the Soviet experience anchored itself, that had been working since the maximalist experience".

=== Connection to the Communist International and I Congress ===
In 1922, PCP's connection to the Communist International (Comintern) is established, the PCP's Secretary of the National Board, Henrique Caetano de Sousa, was designated by the Party as its delegate for the IV Congress of the Communist International in Moscow, where he would become the only leader in PCP's history to be in the presence of Vladimir Lenin. The militant José Pires Barreira is nominated as PCP's delegate for the III Congress of the Communist Youth International. However, the political divergences and personal rivalries within the Party generated a profound crisis, that lead to the arrival of a Comintern delegate, the Swiss Jules Humbert-Droz, in mid August, 1923. He knew the condition of the Party's creation — outside of any direct influence from the Comintern, and that the Party's model had nothing to do with the Leninist model of democratic centralism.

According to Droz's evaluation, "[the] Party hadn't yet had its constituent congress and didn't have an organic status nor a theoretical and tactical program".

Besides this, what also concerned the "international" was the organic desegregation state found in the Party, polarized in two groups, on one side Henrique Caetano de Sousa and José Pires Barreira, and on the other, Carlos Rates, that mutually fought. The Congress, meanwhile postponed to November, 1923, had Droz's participation, armed with a Comintern mandate that gave him full powers. Having constituted the Portuguese Section of the Communist International. The Congress elected a new Central Committee (CC), through secret and nominal voting. Out of 71 lists, Carlos Rates was, with 70 votes, the most voted leader in a CC of nine members, becoming the 1st Secretary General of PCP. In these circumstances, it would have to be established if it was possible to not only clarify the Party's political line but also pass to the social and political intervention, unifying a Party with feeble origins and diffuse thoughts, making way for its bolshevization, like the Communist International demanded. The Communist Youth is, in fact, dissolved.

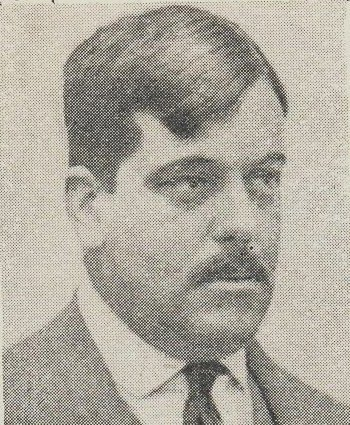
José Carlos Rates, 1st Secretary General of the PCP

Right after the Congress, PCP became very active. In the beginning of the following year, Carlos Rates went to Moscow to participate in the V Congress of the Communist International. Because of his absence, or not, there's an attempt of change of direction in the Party's orientation, starting to focus its propaganda on the danger of a right-wing coup and defending a left front that included the General Confederation of Labour (CGT) and the Democratic Leftwing Republican Party (ED).

=== 1924 manifestation ===
The danger of the right and the coverage of the left front made it that in a big manifestation, in February 1924, they screamed "Down with the reaction!" and "Out with the predominance of living forces!". The communist militants, while telling the press they were standing before the beginning of a proletarian revolution, also stated that it was through their initiative and effort that the protesters that wanted to overtake the parliament were diverted to the headquarters of the newspaper "A Batalha". At the same time that the PCP maintained the version of the imminent revolution, it was also going through many political weaknesses, tactical uncertainties, and profound contradictions, that would end up internally dividing the Party. It was particularly significant that the PCP's representation in the V Congress in the International was ensured by Jules Humbert-Droz, and not by the main leader of the Party, Carlos Rates. The "international" didn't fail to recognize that: "It didn't have illusions about the communist maturity of the Party's direction".

Unlike virtually all other European communist parties, the PCP was not formed after a split of a social democratic or socialist party, but from the ranks of anarcho-syndicalist and revolutionary syndicalist groups, the most active factions in the Portuguese labor movement. The party opened its first headquarters in the Arco do Marquês do Alegrete Street in Lisbon. Seven months after its creation, the first issue of O Comunista (The Communist), the first newspaper of the party, was published.

The congress was attended by about a hundred members of the party and asserted its solidarity with socialism in the Soviet Union and the need for a strong struggle for similar policies in Portugal; it also stated that a fascist coup in Portugal was a serious threat to the party and to the country.

=== 1925 legislative elections ===
For the 1925 legislative elections, PCP proposed an alliance, but it was rejected by the Portuguese Socialist Party, only forming the ED/PCP bloc, where none of the eight PCP candidates, that participated in the respective lists, were elected. In "O Trabalhador Rural", for example, considered that the Party was hidden by its allied, and that the tactic ended up manifesting negatively. It was about the failure of Carlos Rates' direction.

Related or not with this failure and the resulting disappointments, Rates accepts a beneficial proposal by the Union of Economic Interests, a powerful employer central, to be a writer for the newspaper, "O Século". The Party and Comintern found this an unacceptable action with the role he had, and his resignation was demanded. However, he rejected that, being kicked out of the Party on the II Congress, in a framework of demoralization and weakening.

=== Establishment of the military dictatorship ===
This Congress started in Lisbon on 29 May 1926, a day after the coup that, beginning in Braga, established the military dictatorship. Despite this, and still conditioned by this event, the congress' works prolonged until the 30th. A motion is approved, identifying it as a fascist movement, and mandating immediately that the delegates that were present contacted the CGT and the Democratic Leftwing, with the goal of proposing an organization as an answer to the coup. However, the answers were met with hesitation and indifference, especially by the CGT, opposing to any alliance with political parties. The Democratic Leftwing opted to support the coup. PCP, weak enough to elaborate any autonomous reaction, ended the congress on 30 May.

== Outlawing and clandestinity (1926–1974) ==
=== From the 1926 military coup to the Reorganization of 40 ===
After the military coup of May 28, 1926, the party was outlawed, and had to operate in secrecy. By coincidence, the coup was carried out on the eve of the second congress, forcing the suspension of the tasks. In 1927 the party's Main Office was closed. The party was first re-organized in 1929 under Bento Gonçalves. Adapting the party to its new illegal status, the re-organization created a net of clandestine cells to avoid a wave of detentions.

In 1931, the first number of Avante! was published. Despite its illegal status, the newspaper would become the most important publication of the party, being distributed among clandestine members. However, due to the constant assaults of the clandestine printing offices, the newspaper would not become widely available until the 1940s.

In November 1940, several of Portugal's communist leaders, including Álvaro Cunhal, Militão Ribeiro and Júlio Fogaça, were released from prison, where they began reorganizing the PCP. The release of important cadres, combined with the internal dissatisfaction about the decline of the party influenced a major re-organization in 1940–41, named the Reorganization of 40.

These series of events would, in part, lead to the end of the Comintern in 1943. The PCP would only re-establish its relations with the Communist movement and the Soviet Union in 1947, after some sporadic contacts made, at first, through the Communist parties of Spain and France and later through Mikhail Suslov.

For the first time ever, the party was able to build a strong clandestine organization, with a net of clandestine cadres, which would make the party the foundation of the Portuguese resistance against the regime. These improvements in the party's structure led to the creation of the first national platform of democratic organizations, the Movement of National Antifascist Unity (MUNAF), in December 1943. In 1944, the Portuguese support of the German war effort created severe shortages of food and goods, greatly decreasing Portugal's living standards. The situation led to waves of strikes, greatly influenced by the party, in the regions of Lisbon, Ribatejo and Alentejo. By this time, with the re-organized structure successfully avoiding the persecutions, the Avante! was being published at least once per month, stating the party's support to the popular turmoil.

==== Repression and resistance ====
The repression hits the Party in Lisbon, with the break-in of their headquarters, syndicates that it influenced, and the arrest of some leaders, thus causing its disarticulation in the country's capital. Despite the party's activity remaining in some places, like in Porto, the repression that fell upon the February 1927 Revolt is considered demolishing. The break-in and the closing of the regional headquarter led to the dissolving of the north's leadership. The party's activity shrinks, but the channels with the Communist International (CI) remained open, with two Portuguese delegations going to Moscow, one for the 10th anniversary of the February revolution, in 1927, and another for a congress of the Red Trade Union International, in 1928. These delegations included army and navy arsenalists, even though many elements weren't yet part of the Party, like Bento Gonçalves.

==== 1929's "reorganization" ====
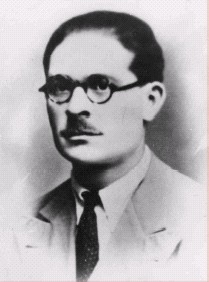
Bento Gonçalves (1929–1942)

In the summer of 1928, when the VI Congress of the CI took place, the PCP was reduced to 50 elements in Lisbon and 20 in Porto. On 21 April 1929, 15 militants gathered in a Conference to proceed to the Party's reorganization. Bento Gonçalves will acknowledge that: "we were few and young".

The new Provisional Central Executive Committee didn't include any of its past elements. It is composed of, among others, by Bento Gonçalves, who will become secretary-general in the first meeting of the new governing body. The April 1929 Conference marked a cut with the previous PCP situation in the organic level, despite the fact that, the ideological changes in the near future will, in the political and ideological point-of-view, be significantly unimpressive. In this phase, "O Proletário" is the main press agency. It is also in this phase that the historian João Madeira considers that Bento reveals himself as "a leader equipped with a strategic sense of action and invested in the doctrinal formulation and consolidation of the party" and that "[he] constituted the most important theoretical production, of Marxist character that PCP had produced". In 1930, the foundations are set for the relaunching of the Federation of the Portuguese Communist Youths. Bento Gonçalves characterized the new regime that was installing itself in Portugal from the Military Dictatorship as fascist. Even though Bento wasn't yet a party official, he was arrested while working in the Navy's Arsenal, in September 1930, being deported without a trial to Cape Verde, where he was jailed for three years.

In the middle of 1931, no element of the Central Executive Committee elected in the April Conference remained free, except José de Sousa, that had immense activity as a union responsible, having also been head of the delegation to the XII Plenum of the Comintern. The Secretariat now consisted of other members.

In the last trimester of 1934, Álvaro Cunhal is recruited by the PCP via the Federation of the Portuguese Communist Youths. There were rapid processes of vertical mobility. Given the context of new militant membership within a framework of intense repression, members who were often newcomers were rapidly called to intermediate and superior bodies. In the VII Congress of the Communist International, in 1935, the PCP Secretariat publishes a resolution that seeks to enshrine, once again, the change in political orientation of the PCP, opposing the fascist unit and the construction of the "Popular Front" to the "class versus class" politic of the Comintern, that revealed itself difficult to accomplish. The document also notes the absence of a Socialist Party, critics the anarcho-syndicalists and revolt republicans, persisting, however, in the idea that in those sectors there was an ongoing shift to what could lead to a likely approach to the antifascist front. The VII Congress of the CI had a profound impact in the delegation. Bento Gonçalves sent the following note to the leaders in the interior about the transformations that would have to happen in the PCP:

The VII Congress highlighted our lack of work in the organizations of fascist masses and others, our political lines excessively sectarian, our slogans and our very radical campaigns, our delay in the united front and the popular front against the fascist dictatorship.

==== Secretariat's arrest ====
Surprised by the political police, in November 1935, in what was described by the historian João Madeira as a "reckless and incredible street meeting", leads, in a single move, to the arrest of the whole Secretariat. Due to this event in the return of the PCP's delegation, the return of the remaining elements is postponed to March 1936. Bento Gonçalves and Franscisco Oliveira expose the behavior of a member of the delegation that stayed in Moscow until January 1936, that facing the police, had exposed one of the Party's typographies and a clandestine house of the Communist Youth whilst being previously arrested, was kicked out by the International Staff Committee, leaving a "ballast of distrust towards the PCP". The efforts that begun in 1929 were unfeasible for many years, and until the end of the decade the Party never recovered itself, in a political, ideological and organic sense. The leadership is recomposed of second-line militants that compose an appeal Secretariat until the spring of 1936. In April 1936, an extended meeting of the board elected a new Central Committee, having Álvaro Cunhal in it for the first time. However, this turbulence is seen by the Communist International as suspicious.

==== The PCP in the Spanish Civil War ====
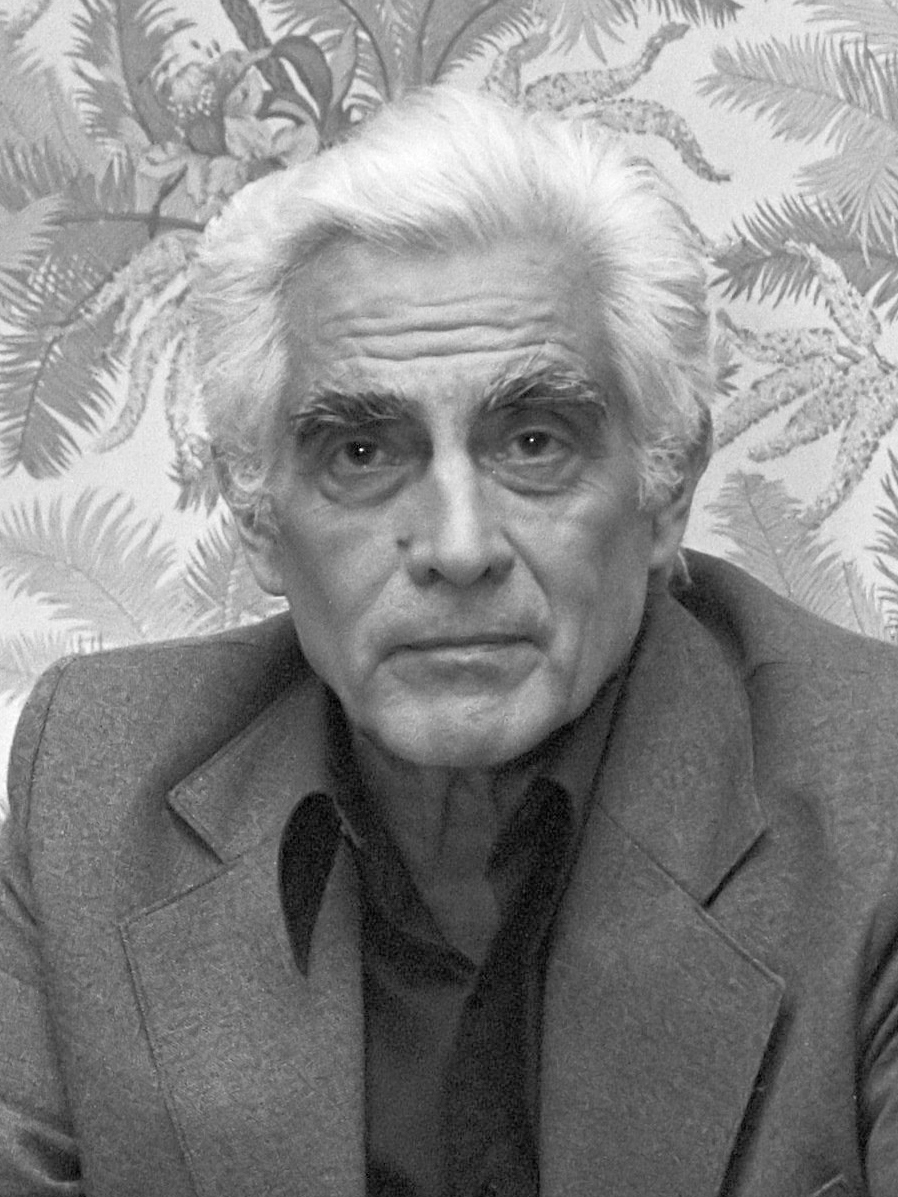
Álvaro Cunhal (1961–1992), its 3rd and longest serving secretary-general.

The PCP's presence in Spain during the Republic and Civil War was due largely to the presence of a high-level Comintern delegation, that ensured the connection between the Central Committee and the Communist Party of Spain, party cadres that featured Victorio Codovilla and Palmiro Togliatti, aspiring the Portuguese representation to a direct connection to the International, with the CPS's intermediation. Militants were sent to Spain to fight on the battlefront for the Republic in the International Brigades, even though that wasn't a central goal of the Party. Nevertheless, it's estimated that there were between 500 and 1200 Portuguese fighters in the republican ranks. Cunhal and Francisco Oliveira arrived in Portugal in January 1937, and Francisco Miguel arrived the following month, all directly from the Soviet Union.

An estimated 1,000 Portuguese fought against the Francoist forces, integrated in the Republican ranks.

==== Suspension of the Communist International ====
CTG's refusal and the republican's reservations caused difficulties in giving shape to the Popular Front. The difficulties to solve the internal wars were large, and the constant police pressure lead to consecutive raids. Cunhal is arrested in July 1937, Alberto Araújo in November, Francisco de Paula Oliveira and Francisco Miguel in January 1938. The organizational situation and the social influence were weak, and the Popular Front was inactive and disjointed. The situation, scrutinized gruffly by Moscow, lead to the suspicion that the Party could be corrupted by police and agent provocateur, since the rhythm of the party cadres' arrests was very high, and that the efforts to replace them from the outside showed to be ineffective. Francisco de Oliveira (Pável) escaped from Aljube's prison and gets out of the country towards Paris and Moscow. In the Comintern, suspicions grew - suspecting the reasons of the success of Pável's escape from salazarist prisons, and being that, all past students of the Leninist School that had come back in 1938, were all arrested, only one being able to escape prison. The Cadres Section of the International suspended the Party and put them under surveillance, cutting ties with it (but not expelling it), under the pretext that they remain: "in the CP of Portugal an environment, observed by the ECCI in 1936, of corrosive provocation and fractionism of the Party".

==== Beginning of the Second World War ====
Álvaro Cunhal's sentence ends in July 1938, when the internal problems in PCP's leadership are advanced. He continues his studies, and doesn't return immediately to clandestinity, but does not also deprive himself from political activity. In 1939 the Second World War starts, and he receives the task of clarifying the Party's position. The Popular Front's strategy ends, evidenced by an article on the party's newspaper:

The war making more profound the contradictions of capitalism, clearly unmasking the "leaders" of the II International as traitors of the proletariat in service of the bourgeoisie, demonstrating that the communists are the only true defenders of the working class, made it possible in some countries to face the seizing of power by the proletariat as a task to put on the agenda.

However, Cunhal and Carolina Loff, important member of the leading group, were arrested, leaving the PCP weakened in many aspects.

=== The Reorganization of 1940 and World War II ===
The concept of "Reorganization" in the PCP, just like in other communist parties, was based on an idea elaborated by the Comintern for cases when parties faced problematic situations regarding leadership, trust, and political control, or when they were unable to carry out "in their country the orientation conjuncturally established by the communist centre". Nevertheless, the suspension meant a "practically total isolation from the international communist device".

==== Tarrafal Prison Communist Organization and the Amnesty of the Centenarians ====
The Tarrafal's Prison Communist Organization (OCPT), where many important communists met up - mainly all of the Secretariat that was arrested in 1935, in the middle of 1940, upon learning about the "Amnesty of the Centenarians", discussed "the way we should act in Portugal to reorganize the Party and to find ways to regularly contact the Camp's organization".

This amnesty of the Centenarians, "by coinciding with the monumental moment of the regime's propaganda", this is, Portugal's Independence in 1140 and the Restoration of Independence in 1640, released from the Tarrafal concentration camp almost four dozen militants, with these playing an important role in the reorganization, for example, Militão Ribeiro, Pedro Soares, Sérgio Vilarigues or Américo Gonçalves de Sousa. Alfredo Dinis (pseudonym Alex), militant since 1936, was arrested in 1938 for having connections to the International Red Aid, being released in 1939. Other militants were also released in 1940, like Júlio Fogaça, who belonged to the Secretariat arrested in 1935 and was the most qualified cadre in the party's hierarchy, José Gregório, important communist leader and responsible for the International Red Aid in Portugal, and Manuel Guedes, arrested in Spain in 1936. The first extended meeting of the "reorganizers" was held in December 1940, in Cova da Piedade. Álvaro Cunhal, that probably rejoined the Party still in 1941, said, in 1992, referring to this period, that:

The government declared that the PCP was definitely liquidated and such confidence showed that with the defeat of the USSR in the war, communism would definitely be a lost cause that released from Tarrafal and other prisons in 1940 several Party leaders. In such circumstances, undertaking the reorganization, I think I can say that the PCP showed how the communists understand their duties to the people and to the country...

The first step of the "reorganization" ends with the constitution of the Political Bureau and its Secretariat, coinciding with the re-release of the party's clandestine press - O Militante, since July 1940, and Avante! since August. Re-establishment of contact with the Communist International is tried through the Communist Party USA, intermediated by the writer José Rodrigues Miguéis, being exiled there. The Vila Franca organization, like the Ribatejo one, were one of the zones where the "reorganized" PCP instituted itself. According to the Ribatejo region responsible, António Dias Lourenço, "[...] we had an active life, organized in regional terms". Pedro dos Santos Soares was the delegate of the "reorganizers" in Braga.

In the war situation, they are approached by the Secret Intelligence Service to report lists of names of pro-Nazis.

==== Financing problems ====
The conjuncture and the scarce financial means made the situation more difficult. And so, they resorted to "not well clarified" ways to obtain funds, especially through the involvement of wolfram businesses. Militão Ribeiro, when in prison in 1942, declared that he negotiated wolfram during a year, after coming back from Tarrafal, because he wanted to buy a new car, thus evading confirming his role as a leader of the "reorganization". José Pedro Soares, that came back from Tarrafal in July 1940, was also involved in the wolfram business. A worker from Sacavém proposed fabricating fake notes, but this proposition was rejected by the leadership because, "in case it is detected, it can be discreditable, because the masses would not understand".

=== The PCP and the Second World War ===
After the favorable conjucture to the antifascist movements, nationally and intertionally, the growth of the party and the start of the Movement of National Antifascist Unity, lead to the idea that the dictatorship had its days counted. According to Avante!, in December 1943, a new working offensive was underway since autumn. The course of the war, heard attentively through Radio Moscow broadcasts, unveiled the defeat of Nazi Germany and Nazifascism. This raised the question of whether Salazar's dictatorship would survive. The PCP's position in this matter is that the defeat of fascism in Europe would lead the initiative of popular actions that would end up overthrowing the dictatorship, and that a foreign liberation wouldn't come. In December 1943, in Sintra, the MUNAF's constitution is institutionalized. It was the PCP's responsibility to share the statement that had its first objective:

Prepare and carry out the current government's suppression and, in its place, establish a Democratic National Government in which every current of antifascist opposition is represented and that gives the Portuguese People the possibility to choose in truly free elections its leaders"

In 1944, the PCP had as its burning goal the overthrow of Salazar, something that seemed close. This seemed to insist in two types of fundamentals of its political action - the MUNAF's amplification and the triggering of another striker movement of the same or superior range of the ones in July/August 1943. In March/April 1944, the bread started being rationed. Alfredo Dinis, communist leader that controls the important region of Lisbon, clearly perceives the "large and alive discontent in the working and popular environments", informing immediately the Central Committee's Secretariat. Other working party sectors were ready to advance, only waiting for the Party's instructions. The strike's date is set late, 8/9 May by the Secretariat, with a similar scheme as the previous ones. However, the attendance fell short of what the Party expected, not exceeding half of those who got involved the previous summer, leading to the necessity of a more in depth evaluation of the striker's movement, that will happen in a plenary meeting of the Central Committee on the 30th of that month. In a discussion, based by the report presented by Alfredo Dinis, it is concluded that it was a "victory with failure" in some aspects, pointing as the fundamental cause of the movement's performance the organization.

In July 1944, the MUNAF's emergency program is approved, coinciding with the beginning of the Nazifascism's defeat, with the battle of Normandy and the soviet offensive of the European East. The idea that Salazar would be swept by the Nazi's defeat was intense. The PCP's Military Committee was formed; Fernando Piteira Santos was responsible for it, which also featured José Magro and Francisco Ramos da Costa. And so, they looked to increase the MUNAF's and the Party's influence in the Armed Forces, and to weaker its repressive capacity through the soldiers that, in case there was a national uprising, would start being on the people's side. The MUNAF's body in the army and navy published the newspaper "A Voz do Soldado".

==== 1942 arrests ====
In 1942, Pedro Soares, Pires Jorge, Júlio Fogaça and other important cadres are arrested, due to the lack of financial means, that lead to the absence of necessary security conditions on the premises that they used. With the arrest of Militão Ribeiro, only one of the three elements of the Secretariat of the Political Bureau remains in clandestinity. And so, important changes happened inside the Party's leadership, leading to the rise of Álvaro Cunhal to the Secretariat, body that "will quickly acquire indisputable political authority", with José Gregório. The growth of the Party's influence, even though limited, and the admission of new militants, led to a significant growth of funds. Pedro Soares, when returning to Tarrafal resumes his studies and participates in the "important student movement against the increase of tuition fees". Cândida Ventura, already a PCP militant, says she participated "in the leadership of big college students manifestations against the increase of tuition fees that originated strikes and rallies in each Colleges and parades through the streets of Lisbon". Armando Bacelar, a Law finalist, said that at that time the manifestation was "the only linking element in the PCP organization between the student sector and the working sector". The Party's goal at that time was to extend the party ranks. José Augusto da Silva Martins, that had a "fundamental role in the academic environment", leaves Coimbra to take care of the "reorganization" in Porto. Due to the war situation, there is a deterioration of the living conditions of the popular layers, leading to a "reawakening of social agitation", that translates in a cycle of strikes between 1942 and 1944 and in the rural movements of 1943-45. The Party, whose influence is absent in these spontaneous movimentations, speaks out in the paradigm of agitation and propaganda through flyers and Avante!.

==== 1942 strikes ====
In a conjuncture that originated the system of rationing, there was a deterioration of salaries that were already low, and other clearly unpopular measures, like the overtime pay of just 50%. After being alerted, Salazar refuses any role of syndicalism activity of the corporate syndicates. But the strikes erupt in Lisbon, spontaneously initiating in Carris, and subsequently in Telephones, continuing to have industrial and factory workers, who were fundamental, join. According to the National Institute of Work and Pensions of the Estado Novo, there where 14 thousand striking workers. Even though a lot of communist militants participated, in the report that José Gregório (Pseudonym Alberto) presents to the III Congress, he acknowledges that:

(...) the leadership of our Party, even though it led the workers in their daily fight to the point of outbreak of the movement, did not realize in time the maturing of the conditions that facilitated the triggering of the strike and did not perform in it its true leadership role.

However, the movement grows exponentially, causing a wave of enthusiasm within the Party. The Secretary of the Political Bureau, Militão Ribeiro, shortly before being arrested, puts the slogan "general strike" in a manifest that he writes at the end of 1942. The government's lack of capability in containing the worsening of the people's living conditions lead the PCP to discuss how to organize new strikes, its size and character.

==== 1943 strikes ====
The 1943 strikes, unlike the previous ones, will be organized and led by the Party, not giving them, however, a general strike character, due to the analysis of the party and the masses conditions by the Party's Leadership. When considering the conditions as met to advance in the industrialized areas, Lisbon, Almada, Barreiro and Ribatejo, the Secretariat proclaimed that:

To oppose to the brutal force with which fascism forces the workers to hunger and misery, the only thing that is left for the workers to respond with is the masses strength. It is necessary to resort to superior ways to fight. It is necessary to suspend the work! It is necessary to go to the strike! It is necessary to do hunger marches! It is necessary to raid all the places where the goods are hoarded! It is necessary to take the goods wherever they are!

On 26 July the first strikes take place, in the cork producers of Almada. When the GNR intervenes, there's already 3 500 strikers. The next day, workers from other sectors join the strike, with the strike having well over ten thousand people. To agitate the sectors, the Communist Party publishes a second manifest in this day, looking to also amplifying them:

A retreat or forfeit, would put the working masses in the mercy of the patronage, it would represent to the future a redoubled exploration and a triggering of a permanent terror over the working masses. The Unity and the Fight are the victory conditions. It is necessary to continue to spread the movement.

Two days after, the PCP talks about 50 thousand strikers. In Barreiro, a state of emergency was declared and in Lisbon the stations entered prevention mode. In the manifest of the CC's Secretariat in this day, a general increase in wages and the expansion of the strike throughout the national territory are requested. However, in the last days of the month, the repression takes on a large scale, with a high number of arrests, compulsive firings, and military mobilization. On 4 August, given the repression proportions, the Party advises the return to the jobs, in what José Gregório calls "organized retreating". According to a report by PIDE-DGS, the PCP emerged before the worker as a leading political force, thus giving place to the consolidation of the "reorganization".

==== Creation of the Movement of National Antifascist Unity ====
Shortly before the strikes, still in 1943, the Communist Party proposed the creation of the MUNAF platform, Movement of National Antifascist Unity, to the remaining opposition political forces, given the conjuncture of the Second World War, that favored the Allies. This idea of an Antifascist Nacional Front was also supported by the Communist International. In O Militante!, the need to organize the resistance against the support of Salazar to the Axis powers is recognized:

Down with the ill-intended that preach the neutrality at all costs to, more easily aid the fascist powers! Let's enlighten the well-intentioned that the salazarist neutrality is nothing more than a mystification to favor the "Axis"! Let's continue the Victory Army for union of all the people crushed by fascism! Let's unite our resistance to the aid provided by Salazar to the "Axis" fascists, and their war maneuvers! Long live the union of all anti-fascists!

MUNAF's goal was, fundamentally, to overthrow Salazar, replace him for a National Unity government that would take measures against the "Axis", liquidate its institutions like the Legião Portuguesa and the National Union, liquidate its corporate institutions, extinguish Tarrafal and release the political prisoners. It also had the goal to implement a wage policy according to the cost of living, a democratic land reform, and the call for elections for a Constituent Assembly. In December 1943, it is formally constituted. Fernando Piteira Santos was the PCP member that took part in the composition of its Central Committee.

==== National and international relations ====
The Party was aware and studied its positions in the International and Soviet Communist Movement, despise its international war situation and channel cuts, through Radio Moscow, that according to Cunhal "frequently clarifies the international life events, that, in another way, would be late to be clarified". The only formal contacts with the international movement were just in the coverage and logistic support sense to the leaders of the Communist Party of Spain exhiled in Latin America to Spain. Santiago Carrillo, that organized these exchanges, complimented the PCP: "We really needed the help of the Portuguese. Later I went to Portugal. The Portuguese comrades always behaved with extraordinary loyalty and great sense of solidarity". This support by the PCP, especially when it came to clandestine housing and transport means, allowed the reconstitution of the PCE. Despite this, there is a dissolution of the Communist International in 1943 without the re-establishment of their ties with the PCP. In the same year, the III Congress, or the I Illegal Congress of the Party, ends with the essential of the "reorganization" process. The new numbering constituted a symbolic importance to the Party, since it was about a new party, "reorganized", quoting with the previous period to Bento Gonçalves' "reorganization". This congress, that defined the tactical and strategical, political and ideological line of the PCP, took place within the framework of the "hot experience" of workers' strikes, in what came out of the VII Congress of the Communist International, and the adoption of orientations spread by the USSR. The strikes "represented the reopening of an offensive cycle of the workers' movement", in which the PCP had an important leading role. The strikes also helped to mold the "united front of the working class" to the concrete conditions of the Portuguese reality, that differentiated fundamentally from those of other countries by not having other expressive resistance parties. The efforts for the MUNAF creation intensified in the spring of 1943, with the German defeat in Stalingrad, just like other communist parties in western Europe with its respective new anti-fascist fronts. The PCP was hegemonic in the front due to the weakness in an organic level of other Parties. The front based itself on the idea that Salazar represented the treason, and that the MUNAF should represent the patriotic and freedom sentiments that were rooted in the nation's forces. The Party advocated for the insurrectional overthrow of fascism, created through the fight of the masses. Cunhal clarifies, also in his report, that this movement of masses would provoke the membership of Armed Forces sectors and police devices.

=== Post-war and the Movement of Democratic Unity ===
In October 1945, the democratic resistance was authorized to form a platform, which was named Movement of Democratic Unity (Portuguese: Movimento de Unidade Democrática, or MUD). Initially, the MUD was controlled by the moderate opposition, but soon became strongly influenced by the PCP that controlled its youth wing. Among the leadership of the youth wing were several communists, including Octávio Pato, Salgado Zenha, Mário Soares, Júlio Pomar and Mário Sacramento.

At this time, Álvaro Cunhal travelled to Yugoslavia with the aid of Bento de Jesus Caraça in order to improve the relations with the Socialist Bloc. Later, in 1948, he travelled to Soviet Union in order to speak with Mikhail Suslov, after the ties between the PCP and the International Communist Movement were re-established.

In 1951, after the death of the president António Carmona, the government, continuing the policy of staging democratic changes, called for an election. The Party, along with other sectors of the opposition, supported the mathematician Ruy Luís Gomes, who would be declared ineligible five days before the election. During the campaign, some supporters of his candidacy had been imprisoned and Gomes himself had been beaten in Rio Tinto.

=== Portuguese Colonial War and last years of the regime ===
The fifth congress, held in September 1957, was the first and the only to be held outside Portugal. In Kyiv, Soviet Union, the Party approved its first program and statutes, revealing an increase of the Party's organic stability. The congress took, for the first time, an official position on colonialism, stating that all people had the right to self-determination, and made clear its support of the liberation movements in the Portuguese colonies, such as MPLA in Angola, FRELIMO in Mozambique and PAIGC in Guinea-Bissau. This was the first congress in the party's history to receive salutations from foreign communist parties.

Despite a massive campaign with a major rally in Porto, attended by 200,000 people, the government's candidate, Américo Tomás, won the election through massive election fraud.

In January 1960, a remarkable event in the party's history occurred: A group of ten PCP members managed to escape from the high-security prison in Peniche. The escape returned to freedom many top figures of the party, among them, Álvaro Cunhal, who would be elected in the following year the first Secretary-general in nineteen years. Among the escapees was also Jaime Serra, who would help to organize a secret commando group, the Armed Revolutionary Action (Portuguese: Acção Revolucionária Armada or ARA.) The ARA was the armed branch of the PCP that would be responsible in the early 1970s for some military action against the dictatorial regime.

In 1961, the Colonial War in Africa began, first in Angola, and in the next year in Mozambique and Guinea-Bissau. The war lasted 13 years and devastated Portuguese society, forcing many thousands of Portuguese citizens, mainly young people, to leave the country seeking a better future in countries like France, Germany or Switzerland, and also to escape conscription. The Party, which had been involved in the formation of the nationalist guerrilla movements along with the Soviet Union, immediately stated its opposition to the war, and political support of the anti-colonial movements. The war initiated a process of decline of the regime as it caused a growing unrest inside Portuguese society.

In 1962, the "Academic Crisis" occurred. The Portuguese regime, fearing the growing popularity of democratic ideas among the students, carried out the boycott and censure of several student associations and organizations, including the important National Secretariat of Portuguese Students. Most members of this organization were intellectual communist militants that were persecuted and forbidden to continue their university studies. The students, with strong aid from the PCP, responded with demonstrations that culminated on 24 March with a huge student demonstration in Lisbon. The demonstration was brutally suppressed by the shock police, leading to hundreds of student injuries.

Álvaro Cunhal, elected General-secretary in 1961, released the report The Path to Victory—The tasks of the Party in the National and Democratic Revolution which became a document of major influence within the democratic movement.

The ARA would keep attacking political and military targets of the regime until August 1972. Some of its major attacks included an attack to the school of the political police, the PIDE, the bombing of the Niassa ship, the destruction of several war helicopters in the Tancos air base, the bombing of the cultural center of the United States embassy and an attack to the regional NATO command in Oeiras.

== Between the Carnation Revolution and the end of the Cold War (1974–1991) ==
=== 1970s ===
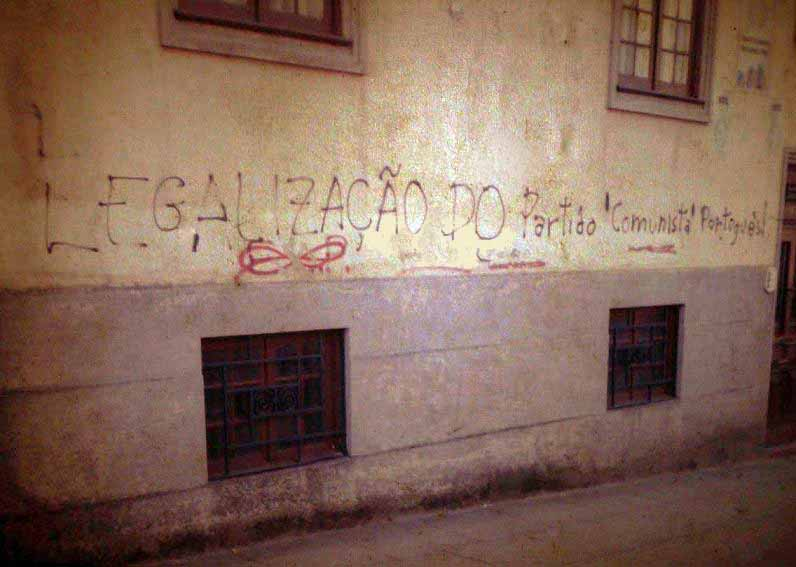
"Legalização do Partido Comunista Português" (transl. Legalization of the Portuguese Communist Party) (1974)

Immediately after the revolution, basic democratic rights were re-established in Portugal. On 27 April, political prisoners were freed. On 30 April, Álvaro Cunhal returned to Lisbon, where he was received by thousands of people. May Day was commemorated for the first time in 48 years, and an estimated half million people gathered in the FNAT Stadium (now 1 May Stadium) in Lisbon to hear speeches by Cunhal and the socialist Mário Soares.

A major struggle of the party was assuring the unity of all labour unions inside the General Confederation of the Portuguese Workers, which was opposed by the Socialists and the Social Democrats. The Party also criticized the growing interference by NATO in the revolutionary process, which was supported by the Socialists and by the right-wing.

Six months after the Carnation Revolution, on 20 October 1974, the party's seventh congress took place. More than a thousand delegates and hundreds of Portuguese and foreign guests attended. The congress set forth important statements that discussed the ongoing revolution in the country. The 36 members of the elected central committee had in the aggregate experienced more than 300 years in jail. On 26 December 1974, the PCP became the first legally recognized party. The 36 members of the elected Central Committee had spent more than 300 years in jail.

On 11 March 1975, the left-wing military forces defeated a coup attempt by rightists in the military. This resulted in a turn in the revolutionary process to the political left, with the main sectors of the economy, such as the banks, transportation, steel mills, mines, and communications companies, being nationalized. This was done under the lead of Vasco Gonçalves, a member of the military wing who supported the party and who had become prime minister after the first provisional government resigned. The party then asserted its complete support for these changes and for the Agrarian Reform process that implemented collectivization of the agricultural sector and the land in a region named the "Zone of Intervention of the Agrarian Reform" or "ZIRA", which included the land south of the Tagus River. The PCP took the lead of that process and drove it according to the party's program, organizing thousands of peasants into cooperatives. Combined with the party's strong clandestine organization and support of the peasants' movement during the preceding years in that region, these efforts made the south of Portugal the major stronghold of the PCP. The party gained more than half of the votes in Beja, Évora, and Setúbal in subsequent elections.

In the spring of 1975, as rumors of a communist takeover spread, relations between the communists and the moderate socialists deteriorated. Non-communist parties and the military attempted to exclude the PCP from government. The United States, several West European governments and political parties supported the Portuguese socialists against the PCP, which was supported by the Soviet Union although its focus shifted to Angola and other Portuguese colonies in Africa.

One year after the revolution, the first democratic elections took place to elect the parliament that would write a new Constitution to replace the Constitution of 1933. The Party achieved 12.52% of the voting and elected 30 MPs. In the summer of 1975 the revolutionary process reached its climax, and the government of Vasco Gonçalves, influenced by the left, was under attack from the Socialist Party and the right-wing. Several rallies and demonstrations both in support of and against the government were being held. During the summer, several party offices were attacked, pillaged or set on fire. On July 19 a major rally organized by the Socialists against the party was held in Lisbon. In August, nine influential military officers (the Group of 9) issued a document against Vasco Gonçalves and the Movement of the Armed Forces. In the following months the tension continued between the PCP and the moderated parties. In September, Gonçalves was replaced by Pinheiro de Azevedo. The divisions inside the military were growing, and, on November 25, a coup attempt by the radical left was thwarted by the right wing military. In the aftermath, the party was attacked by the remaining forces, but a notable speech by Melo Antunes, a member of the Group of 9, asserted the importance of the PCP inside the Portuguese democratic regime.

In 1976, after the approval of the constitution, the second democratic election was carried out and the PCP raised its share of the vote to 14.56% and 40 seats. In the same year, the first Avante! Festival took place, and the eighth congress was held in Lisbon from 11–14 November. The congress mainly stated the need to continue the quest for socialism in Portugal and the need to defend the achievements of the revolution against what the party considered to be a political step backward, led by a coalition of the Socialist Party and the right-wing Centro Democrático Social, who opposed the agrarian reform process.

In 1979, the party carried out its ninth congress, which analyzed the state of the post-revolutionary Portugal, right-wing politics and the party's struggles to keep the nationalized economy.

=== 1980s ===
After the sudden death of Sá Carneiro in an airplane crash in 1980, the political instability returned and the right-wing coalition government disintegrated in 1983. In the subsequent legislative election, the party achieved 44 MPs and 18.20% of the vote as part of the APU in the 1983 elections. The election was won by the Socialists that formed a grand coalition with the Social Democrats. Also in 1983 the party held the tenth congress that again criticized what it saw as the dangers of right-wing politics.

In 1986, the surprising rise of Mário Soares, who reached the second round in the presidential election, defeating the party's candidate, Salgado Zenha, made the party call an extra congress. The eleventh congress was called with only two weeks' notice, in order to decide whether or not to support Soares against Freitas do Amaral. Soares was supported, and he won by a slight margin. Had he not been supported by the PCP, he would have probably lost. In 1987, after the resignation of the government, another election took place. The PCP, now in the Unitary Democratic Coalition (Portuguese: Coligação Democrática Unitária or CDU) with the Ecologist Party "The Greens" (Portuguese: Partido Ecologista "Os Verdes" or PEV) and the Democratic Intervention (Portuguese: Intervenção Democrática or ID), saw an electoral decline to 12.18% and 31 seats.

The first Avante! Festival took place. The festival would become a major political and cultural event in Portugal and is still held yearly, as of 2006. The eighth congress was held in Lisbon from November 11–14. The congress mainly stated the need to continue the quest for Socialism in Portugal and the need to defend the achievements of the Revolution against what the party considered to be a political step backward, led by a coalition of the Socialist Party and the right-wing Centro Democrático Social, who were opposed to the Agrarian Reform process.

Funeral of Álvaro Cunhal in Lisbon

In 1988, another congress took place, the twelfth, held in Porto, in which more than 2,000 delegates participated. The congress analyzed the evolution of the political situation in Eastern Europe and also the right wing policies carried out by the government of Aníbal Cavaco Silva. A new set of statutes and a program were put forth, with the new program being titled, "Portugal, an Advanced Democracy for the 21st Century". The program, which is still the party's program (as of 2006), traced five major objectives to the party's struggle: a free democratic regime, based on the citizens' participation, an economic development based on a mixed economy at the service of the people, a social policy capable of assuring the rise of the country's living standards, culture available to everyone, and an independent and sovereign Portugal, pursuing peaceful relations with all countries and peoples.

At the end of the 1980s, the Socialist Bloc of Eastern Europe started to disintegrate and the Party faced new challenges. With many members leaving, the Party called an extra congress for May 1990, in Loures. There, the majority of the more than 2,000 delegates decided to continue the Party's "revolutionary way to Socialism", clashing with what many other communist parties around the world were doing, by keeping its Marxist-Leninist guidelines. The congress asserted that socialism in the Soviet Union had failed, but that a unique historical experience, several social changes and several achievements by the labour movement had been influenced by the Socialist Bloc. Álvaro Cunhal was re-elected General Secretary and Carlos Carvalhas was elected Assistant General Secretary.

== Modern era (1991–present) ==
=== 1990s ===
In December 1996, the fifteenth congress was held, this time in Porto, with more than 1,600 delegates participating. The congress criticized the right-wing policies of the Socialist government of António Guterres and also debated the future of the Party following the debacle of the Socialist Bloc. During the first government of Guterres, the first referendum to the abortion law was held in Portugal. Despite a massive campaign from the Party and the remaining leftwing forces, the liberalization of abortion was rejected by the voters.

In the subsequent local elections, the Party continued to decline, but in the legislative election of 1999 the Party increased its voting percentage for the first time in many years. The sixteenth congress was held in December 2000 and Carlos Carvalhas was re-elected General Secretary. In the legislative election of 2002, held after the resignation of the socialist Prime-Minister António Guterres, the Party achieved its lowest voting result ever, with only 7.0% of the votes. The right-wing returned to power with a coalition between the Social Democratic Party and the People's Party. The new government introduced several changes in the labour laws that triggered the first general strike in many years, in December 2002. With the strong support of the Party and of the CGTP, hundreds of thousands of workers participated in the strike.

=== 2000s ===
The seventeenth congress, in November 2004, elected Jerónimo de Sousa, a former metallurgical worker, as the new General Secretary and analyzed the political situation since the last congress in 2000. It also reaffirmed the program adopted in the 12th Congress. Minor changes in the statutes, such as considering the official website as the Party's official press or adapting the voting methods to the new laws that made voting by showing hands illegal, were also introduced.

After the 2005 local election, in which the PCP regained the presidency of 7 municipalities, the party holds the leadership of 32 (of 308) municipalities, most of them in Alentejo and Setúbal, and holds the leadership of hundreds of civil parishes and local assemblies. The local administration by PCP is usually marked by concern about such issues as preventing privatization of the water supply, funding culture and education, providing access to sports, and promoting health, facilitating participatory democracy, and preventing corruption.

Álvaro Cunhal died on 13 June 2005 after being away from the public eye for several years. Two days later, 250,000 people gathered in Lisbon to attend to his funeral, one of the largest funerals in Portuguese history.

The PCP's work now follows the program of an "Advanced Democracy for the 21st Century". Issues like the decriminalization of abortion, workers' rights, the increasing fees for the health service and education, the erosion of the social safety net, low salaries and pensions, imperialism and war, and solidarity with other countries such as Iraq, Afghanistan, Palestine, Cuba, and the Basque Country are constant concerns in the party's agenda.

=== 2010s ===
In 2017, the party, alongside the Portuguese Socialist Party, the social-democratic PSD, BE and the ecologist party PEV, voted in favour of abolishing party fundraising limits, thereby opening all Portuguese parties to private political donorship, with no obligation to disclose the donations source. The new proposal was reluctantly approved by the Portuguese president Marcelo Rebelo de Sousa.

=== 2020s ===
After the last local election, in 2021, in which the Party lost the presidency of 5 municipalities, the Portuguese Communist Party holds the leadership of 18 (of 308) municipalities, most of them in Alentejo and Setúbal, and has leadership of hundreds of civil parishes, and local assembly members. The local administration of the PCP often concerns itself with issues such as preventing privatization of the water supply, funding culture and education, providing access to sports and promoting health, facilitating participatory democracy and preventing corruption.

The Party's work still follows the program set forth by "Advanced Democracy for the 21st Century". Issues like the decriminalization of abortion, workers rights, the increasing fees for the Health Service and Education, the erosion of the social safety net, low salaries and pensions, imperialism and war, and solidarity with other countries such as Cuba, and the Basque Country are constant concerns in the Party's agenda.

In the XVII Legislative election, of May 18, 2025, the Party ran in coalition with the Partido Ecologista os Verdes party, under the CDU banner. The coalition received 183,741 votes, representing 2,91% of the electorate, which entitled them to 3 parliamentary seats.

==== Reaction to the 2022 invasion of Ukraine ====
Since the beginning of the 2022 Russian invasion of Ukraine, the PCP has come under the spotlight for being the sole political party represented in Parliament to have avoided a clear condemnation of Russia from the start, choosing instead to repeatedly blame the United States, the European Union, and NATO for the war.

On 24 February (the first day of the invasion), the party refused to condemn Russia, upon being explicitly invited to do so by Foreign Affairs Minister Augusto Santos Silva (Socialist Party) in a parliamentary debate. The communists stated that the conflict was "more profound" than "a problem between Russians and Ukrainians", and instead blamed the United States, accusing them of being "the party that is truly interested in having a new war in Europe" and of "promoting" it in order to "turn attentions away from internal problems" and to "ensure a large-scale sale of weapons".

On 1 March, the two Communist Party members of the European Parliament voted against a resolution condemning the invasion. The party said the resolution was "fuelling the escalation", "seeking to impose a unilateral view" and "justifying the colossal process of increasing military expenditures, the strengthening and expansion of NATO and the militarisation of the EU". The document was approved with more than 600 votes in favour, 13 against and 26 abstentions.

On 8 March, the PCP's leader Jerónimo de Sousa blamed all entities involved in the war (Russia included, although referring to its actions by the Kremlin's language of a "military operation"). He stated the party condemned "the whole process of meddling and of confrontation which took place [in Ukraine], the US-promoted coup d'état in 2014, Russia's recent military intervention and the intensification of the bellicose escalation made by the US, NATO and the EU".

On 20 April, the PCP announced that it would not attend the Parliament's solemn session where President of Ukraine Volodymyr Zelenskyy would speak, the following day. The party's parliamentary leader Paula Santos rejected condoning "the participation of someone who personifies a xenophobic and bellicose power", calling the session a "stage to contribute for the escalation of war".

On 23 April, questioned by a journalist as to whether he considered that there was an invasion going on, party leader Jerónimo de Sousa replied: "There was a military operation which we have condemned." Following the journalist's insistence on the question, he rejected using the word 'invasion' and instead hesitantly responded: "At least, from the images we have... from the images we have, there is a conflict, there is a war. That is unavoidable and must be recognised." The word 'invasion' would later be used officially by new secretary-general Paulo Raimundo in November 2022, following similar statements from fellow MPs.

== See also ==
- Communist Party of Portugal (in Construction)
- Portuguese Communist Party
- Electoral results of the Portuguese Communist Party
- History of Portugal
- Carnation Revolution
- Catarina Eufémia
