= List of Portuguese communists =

This is a list of persons that are or were supporters or members of the Portuguese Communist Party.

== General secretaries ==
- José Carlos Rates (1871–1961) — Carlos Rates was elected after the 1st congress, held in Lisbon in 1923. He was chosen to General Secretary by the delegate of the Communist International in Portugal, Jules Humbert-Droz, after several problems inside the newly founded Party. Later, Bento António Gonçalves would become the Party's General Secretary and criticize Rates' work as the leader of PCP.
- Bento António Gonçalves (1929–1942) — Elected in 1929, Bento Gonçalves was born in Montalegre, near Bragança, in the North of Portugal. In September 1928 he joined the Portuguese Communist Party and became a member of the cell of the Arsenal of Alfeite. In 1929 he participated in the reorganizing conference that adapted the Party to its illegal status after the military coup of 1926. Soon after, he became Secretary General. He was arrested several times by the political police and sent to the Tarrafal concentration camp, where he died in 1942.
- Álvaro Barreirinhas Cunhal (1961–1992) — Álvaro Cunhal (1913–2005) is considered one of the most influential personalities of the Portuguese 20th Century. Cunhal joined the PCP in 1931 and rapidly became one of the leading members of the Party. Cunhal was elected in 1961 after escaping from the prison in 1960. After the Carnation Revolution he returned and had a major role in the revolutionary process, being minister of several provisional governments. Cunhal had a degree in Law, but was also a writer and a painter. He died in June 2005 and his funeral was attended by an estimated 250.000 people.
- Carlos Alberto Carvalhas (1992–2004) — Elected in 1992 after being elected assistant General Secretary in the 13th congress, in 1990. Carvalhas (b. 1941) is an economist. After participating in several protests and campaigns against the dictatorship, he became a member of the provisional governments after the Carnation Revolution in 1974/75 with the tasks of the employment. In the 1980s he was member of the European Parliament and of the Council of Europe. In 1991 he was the Party's candidate to the presidential election. He was later a member of the Portuguese Parliament for several years.
- Jerónimo Carvalho de Sousa (2004–) — Elected after the 17th Congress in 2004, Jerónimo de Sousa (b. 1947) is a former metallurgical worker and still member of the metallurgical workers' union. He was member of the Constituent Assembly and of the subsequent Parliaments and was noted for being among the few MPs with working-class origins, a strange fact at the time, and also today. Jerónimo was also the Party's presidential candidate in 1996, but left the race giving his support to the Socialist candidate Jorge Sampaio. He was chosen again as presidential candidate again to the election of 2006.

== Artists ==
- Adriano Correia de Oliveira
- Carlos Paredes
- Fernanda Lapa
- Fernando Lopes Graça
- José Dias Coelho
- Manuel Freire
- Siza Vieira

== Writers ==
- Alves Redol
- Ary dos Santos
- Augusto da Costa Dias
- José Gomes Ferreira
- José Saramago
- Miguel Urbano Rodrigues
- Orlando Costa
- Soeiro Pereira Gomes
- Urbano Tavares Rodrigues
- Francisco Miguel Duarte

== Anti-fascist resistants ==
- Alfredo Dinis
- Ângelo Veloso
- António Dias Lourenço
- Alves Redol
- Carolina Loff
- Catarina Eufémia
- José Casanova
- José Vitoriano
- Júlio Fogaça
- Militão Ribeiro
- Octávio Pato
- Virgínia Moura

== Academics ==
- Bento de Jesus Caraça
- José Barata-Moura
- Mário Sacramento
- Carlos Aboim Inglez

== Trade unionists ==
- Arménio Carlos
- Manuel Carvalho da Silva

== Others ==
- Abílio Fernandes
- António Simões de Abreu
- Ilda Figueiredo
- Miguel Madeira
- Odete Santos
- Alexís Jasek
- Grégory Jerome Jasek
- Pedro Guerreiro
- Sérgio Ribeiro
- Vasco Gonçalves
