= Lucyna Nyka =

Polish architect

- Born: Poland
- Citizenship: Polish
- Education: Gdańsk University of Technology
- Scientific career
- Fields: Architecture, Urban planning
- Thesis: Wpływ przemian estetycznych początku XX wieku na współczesne relacje pomiędzy architekturą i naturą (1995)

Lucyna Nyka is a Polish architect, full professor at Gdańsk University of Technology. Dean of the Faculty of Architecture (since 2016), head of Department of Marine and Industrial Architecture, in 2008-2016 a vice-dean for Research

Her research interests focus on issues concerning water-related architecture and urban landscapes. She is the author and co-author of many projects focused on urban renewal. She was an author of the EU-founded (Audiovisual and Cultural Agency) Intensive Program ‘Bridging the City – Water in Architecture, Urban Spaces and Planning’, co-author of ‘Sensing the City – Designing Urban Experience’ and ‘Art & Science– Synergy of Technology and Art in the City Spaces’. She is an author of the ‘Reclaiming the Royal Brook in Gdańsk’ project co-financed by Pomeranian Foundation for Environmental Protection and Water Management, participated in the project ‘Think BETA - Evolution of Smart Cities’ co-financed by German Federal Ministry for Education and Research. Since 2011 she has been a Faculty coordinator of the international CEEPUS ‘Urban Innovation Network’ programme and a visiting expert to European Workshop on Waterfront Urban Design (Lusófona University Lisbon). She is an invited guest lecturer and studio critic at many European universities.

== Teaching subjects ==
- Architecture

== Research interests ==
- Architecture
- Urban planning
- Public utility objects architecture

== Publications ==
Lucyna Nyka is an author of two books (‘Od architektury cyrkulacji do urbanistycznych krajobrazów’, 2006 (From Architecture of Circulations to Urban Landscapes) and ‘Architektura i woda – przekraczanie granic', 2013 (Architecture and Water – Crossing the Boundaries). She is an editor of several books, e.g. L. Nyka (Ed.): ‘Water for urban strategies’. Weimar: Verlag der Bauhaus-Universität Weimar 2007, L. Nyka, J. Szczepański (Eds.): ‘Culture for Revitalisation/ Revitalisation for Culture’. Laznia CCA, Gdansk, 2010, and author and co-author of many scientific papers published internationally, e.g. Nyka L.: From Structures to Landscapes – towards re-conceptualisation of urban condition, in: Architectural Research Addressing Societal Challenges, Taylor & Francis 2016 (in print). Nyka L.: Experiencing Historic Waterways and Water Landscapes of the Vistula River Delta, in: F. Vallerani, F. Visentin (Eds.) Waterways as Cultural Landscapes, Routledge 2017 (in print), Nyka L.: Polder And City: Sustaining Water Landscapes on an Urban Edge, in: SGEM 2016, Wien, Urbanowicz K., Nyka L.: Interactive and media architecture – from social encounters to city planning strategies. Procedia Engineering (2016), Nyka L., Borucka J., Urbanowicz K.: Experiencing the Ocean – the Paths for Urban Development of São Pedro do Estoril, in: P. Ressano Garcia (Ed.), Waterfront Cascais, University Lusofona, Lisboa 2015, and many others.

== Membership of societies ==
- Research Committee by the European Association for Architectural Education (EAAE) (2011-2012)
- EAAE Council member (2012-2014)
- Member of the Architecture and Urbanism Committee by the Polish Academy of Sciences (PAN) (since 2011)

== Redactor ==
Editorial board member and a reviewer to several journals in Poland and abroad, e.g.:

- Architecture and Urbanism Quarterly (Kwartalnik Architektury i Urbanistyki) issued by Polish Academy of Sciences, Architectus, etc.

== Books ==
- Lucyna Nyka Od architektury cyrkulacji do urbanistycznych krajobrazów (From Architecture of Circulations to Urban Landscapes) Gdańsk 2006, ISBN 83-7348-165-6
- Lucyna Nyka Architektura i woda – przekraczanie granic, 2013, (Architecture and Water – Crossing the Boundaries) ISBN 978-83-7348-500-6
- Lucyna Nyka (red.): Water for urban strategies. Weimar: Verlag der Bauhaus-Universität Weimar 2007
- Lucyna Nyka, Jakub Szczepański (red.): Culture for Revitalisation/Revitalisation for Culture. Łaźnia CCA, Gdańsk, 2010
