= Cândida Ventura =

Portuguese political activist (1918–2015)

- Born: Cândida Margarida Ventura; 30 June 1918; Maputo, Mozambique
- Died: 16 December 2015 (Aged 97); Portimão, Portugal
- Education: University of Lisbon
- Known for: Activities in opposition to the Estado Novo regime in Portugal.

Cândida Ventura (30 June 1918, Maputo, Mozambique – 16 December 2015, Portimão, Portugal) was a political activist against the Portuguese Estado Novo regime and a political prisoner. She was the first woman to hold a leadership position in the Portuguese Communist Party (PCP).

== Early life ==
Cândida Margarida Ventura was born in the city of Lourenço Marques (now Maputo), in Portuguese Mozambique, on 30 June 1918. She was the daughter of a railway official, António Ventura, and a primary-school teacher, Clementina de Deus Franco Pires Ventura. Shortly after her birth the family returned to Portugal, settling in Caldas de Monchique in the Algarve, where her father worked in the spa town. At the age of 11, Ventura went to study in Lisbon, being supported by a schoolteachers' organization. After completing high school, she entered the Faculty of Arts of the University of Lisbon, where she studied Historical-Philosophical Sciences. One of her friends there was the writer and painter Mário Dionísio, who wrote a poem called The ballad of separated friends, in which he referred to her as "Joana with clear eyes". At university she also met Fernando Piteira Santos. The two married but the marriage lasted less than a year.

== Early activism ==
Influenced by the Spanish Civil War, she joined the Brigada Anti-Fascista Femenil (Women’s Anti-fascist Brigade - BAFF), the Portuguese Communist Youth, the Conselho Nacional das Mulheres Portuguesas (National Council of Portuguese Women – CNMP), the Associação Feminina Portuguesa para a Paz (Portuguese Women's Association for Peace - AFPP) and Socorro Vermelho Internacional (International Red Aid), an aid organization established by the Communist International. She also worked with the future PCP leader, Álvaro Cunhal, as part of the editorial team of the weekly magazine O Diabo, which was published between 1934 and 1940, before being closed by the regime's censors.

== Clandestine for 18 years ==
After completing the degree work she started in Lisbon at the University of Coimbra in 1943, Ventura went underground, living a clandestine existence at the request of José Gregório, a member of the Central Committee of the PCP. One of her functions was to support the secretariat of the Central Committee. She used various pseudonyms, including Joana, Rosa, André, and Rosário. In 1946, she was the first woman to join the Central Committee. In that year she began publication of Tres Paginas, a bulletin for communist women working underground, which from 1956 took on the name A Voz das Camaradas das Casas do Partido (The Voice of the Comrades of the Party Houses).

== Arrest and detention ==
In the 1950s, Ventura became responsible for the PCP in the north of the country. It was at this time that she was accused of factionalism, when she disagreed with the statutes and the programme being planned by the party. As a consequence, she was temporarily removed from the Central Committee, although she returned in 1957. In 1958 she travelled illegally to the Soviet Union, where her first doubts about the communist regime began to emerge. Returning to Portugal, and still in hiding, she assumed responsibility for student and intellectual groups in Lisbon. On 3 August 1960 she was arrested by the Portuguese secret police, along with her partner at the time, Orlando Lindim Ramos, after 17 years in hiding. Held in isolation and subjected to torture at a time when she was pregnant, she was transferred to hospital in a very bad condition, where she had a miscarriage. She was eventually sentenced to five years in Caxias prison near Lisbon. However, she was paroled in 1963 in view of her bad health and fled to the Soviet Union for medical treatment.

== Czechoslovakia ==
Ventura then moved to Czechoslovakia, where she wrote for the Communist International magazine under the pseudonym of Catarina Mendes and also helped edit an international magazine called Problems of Peace and Socialism. She met and befriended Alexander Dubček, the Czechoslovak communist leader, and Artur London, who would later author the preface to Ventura's book about her experience with socialism. She was in Prague during the political liberalization of the first half of 1968 under Dubček, known as the Prague Spring, and witnessed the invasion of the country by Warsaw Pact troops. Her daughter Rosa joined her in Prague in 1969, when she was 17.

== Split with PCP and later life ==
After the Carnation Revolution that overthrew the Estado Novo, Ventura returned to Portugal. However, her denunciation of the Soviet Union's repression of Eastern Europe led to a split with the PCP. She initially obtained work with the Portuguese Ministry of Foreign Affairs. Moving back to the Algarve in 1976 she became a schoolteacher and, subsequently, a professor at the Instituto Superior Manuel Teixeira Gomes (ISMAT), which belongs to Grupo Lusófona. In 1984 she wrote O socialismo que eu vivi (The socialism that I lived), in which she recounted her experiences and criticised the oppression that characterized communist regimes.

Ventura, died on 16 December 2015, in Portimão, following respiratory problems.
