= Militão Ribeiro =

Portuguese politician

Militão Bessa Ribeiro (13 August 1896 – 2 January 1950) was a Portuguese politician, member of the Portuguese Communist Party, during the illegality, who struggled against the fascist regime of Estado Novo. They were born in Murça.

After the death of the former General Secretary of the Party, Bento Gonçalves, in the Concentration camp of Tarrafal, in Portuguese Cape Verde, Militão Ribeiro initiated, along with Álvaro Cunhal and Júlio Fogaça, a major reorganization of the Party, in the early 1940s. Such reorganization, based on the Leninist principles, transformed the Party in the major reference of the resistance against the regime.

In 1949, Ribeiro was arrested by the political police, the PIDE, and imprisoned in the penitentiary of Lisbon. Ribeiro would die shortly after, a victim of beatings and liver problems in captivity. Before dying, he managed to send a letter to some Party comrades, written with his own blood.
