= Júlio Fogaça =

Portuguese politician

Júlio de Melo Fogaça (1907, Cadaval – 1980) was a Portuguese politician and member of the Portuguese Communist Party (PCP), who had a major role in the resistance against the dictatorial regime that ruled Portugal from 1926 to 1974.

In 1935, Fogaça became a member of the Party's Secretariat, being imprisoned in the same year by the political police, and sent to the Tarrafal concentration camp in the Cape Verde Islands. In 1940, he received amnesty and was released. At the time, along with several other important Party cadres, such as Álvaro Cunhal and Militão Ribeiro, Fogaça initiated a major reorganization of the PCP.

In 1942, Fogaça was sent to Tarrafal again, being released in 1945. In 1946, he participated in the 4th Congress of the Party, being elected to the Central Committee. However, in the 1950s, ideological divergences with Cunhal led him to start conflicting with the PCP leadership. In 1960, he was imprisoned again, and would only be released in 1970. Meanwhile, in 1961, he was expelled from the PCP, as Cunhal assumed leadership (which he maintained for over 30 years).

After the democratic Carnation Revolution, in 1974, Fogaça approached the Party again. He died in 1980 and donated his goods to the Lisbon Science Academy.
