= Pedro dos Santos Soares =

Portuguese communist and anti-government activist

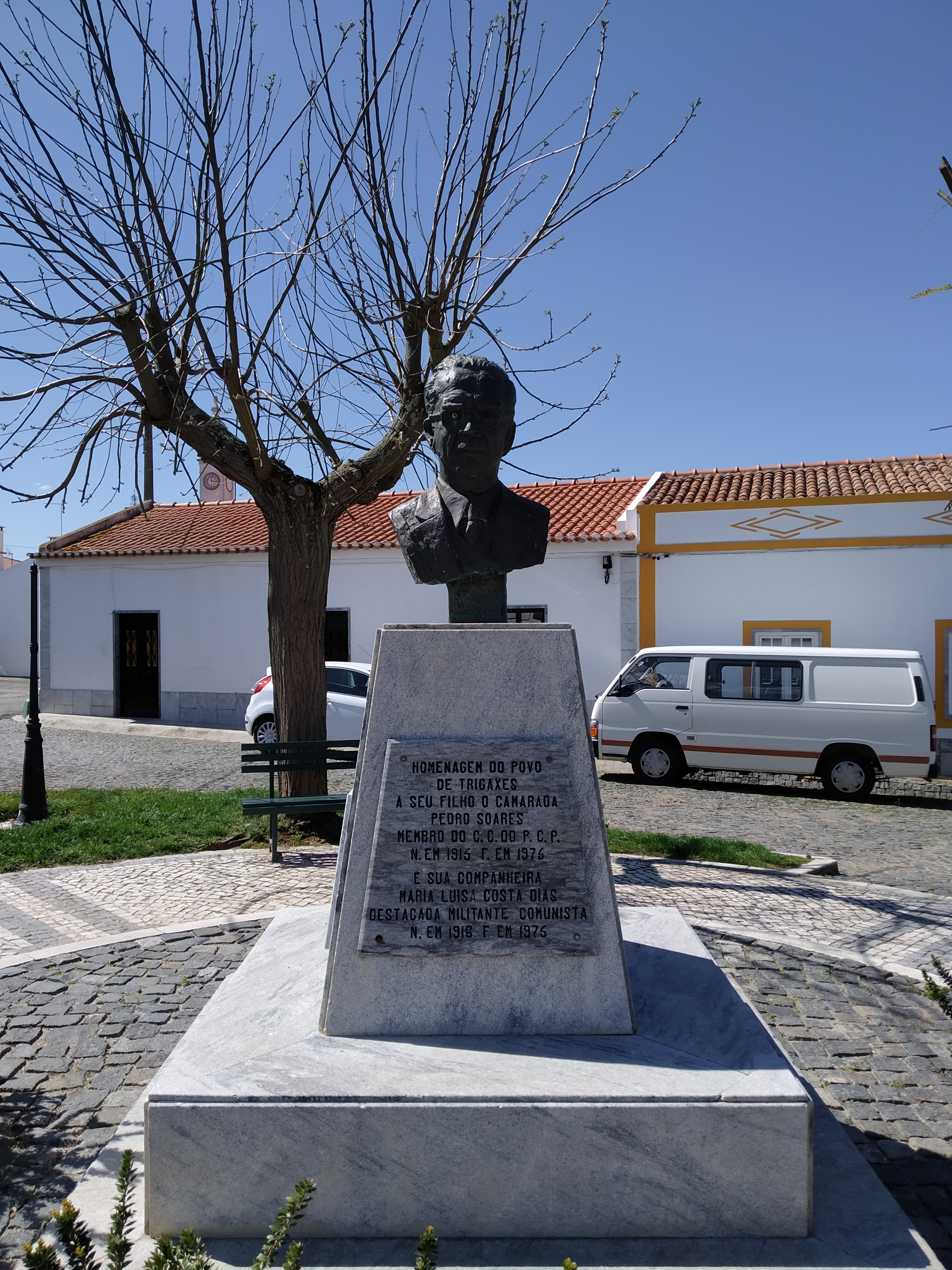
- Bust of Pedro Soares in Trigaches
- Born: 13 January 1915; Trigaches e São Brissos, Portugal
- Died: 10 May 1975 (aged 60); Vila Franca de Xira, Portugal
- Other names: Pedro Soares
- Known for: Opposition to Estado Novo government, spending twelve years in political prisons

Pedro dos Santos Soares (1915 – 1975) was a Portuguese communist activist who campaigned against the authoritarian Estado Novo government and was arrested on numerous occasions, spending about twelve years in political prisons.

== Early life ==
Pedro dos Santos Soares was born on 13 January 1915 in the village of Trigaches, in the municipality of Beja, in the Beja District of Portugal. He attended high school in Beja. He began his political activism at the age of sixteen, participating in several student strikes and protests against the Estado Novo. On moving to the Portuguese capital Lisbon in 1932 to complete his studies, he joined the Communist Youth Federation and began to contribute articles to the anti-government press.

== Arrests ==
Having joined the Portuguese Communist Party (Portuguese: Partido Comunista Português), he was arrested for the first time in March 1934, during a student demonstration in Lisbon, being released shortly afterwards. In total he would spend about twelve years as a prisoner of the regime, being incarcerated in several prisons, including Aljube prison in Lisbon, now a Resistance Museum; Caxias prison; the Peniche Fortress; and in Porto. In 1936 he was one of the first prisoners sent to Tarrafal camp, a prison in the Portuguese colony of Cape Verde, from which he was released in 1940, only to be returned there between 1943 and 1946. He wrote a book about his experiences there, called Tarrafal: Campo da Morte Lenta, (Tarrafal: Camp of the Slow Death), which was published by the Communist Party clandestinely and anonymously in 1947.

After being released in 1940 he resumed studies at the Faculty of Arts of the University of Lisbon. He was one of the leaders of the students in 1941 when they protested against an increase in fees. In 1941 and 1942 he played an important role in the reorganization of the Portuguese Communist Party. He was arrested again in August 1942 and held in Caxias prison, from where he made a failed attempt to escape, being sent back to Tarrafal in June 1943. After release from Tarrafal, Soares, accompanied by his wife, Maria Luísa Costa Dias, a doctor and also a communist activist, went to Mozambique from 1947 to 1950, to help organize the communist party there. In 1953 he joined the Portuguese party's Central Committee, where he remained until his death in 1975. In 1954, he was again arrested and held in the prison of the PIDE (International and State Defence Police) in Porto, from where he escaped, going underground and working to organize the Communist Party in the area to the south of Porto. In January 1960, he was arrested again, and held at the Peniche Fortress, being one of a group of nine to escape from there that included the Communist Party leader, Álvaro Cunhal. He then went to Algiers, leading the Patriotic National Liberation Front, which was an organization aiming to overthrow the Portuguese government. He returned to Portugal after the Carnation Revolution of 25 April 1974, which overthrew the Estado Novo, and was elected to the Portuguese Parliament in the 1975 elections as a representative of the District of Santarém.

== Death ==
Pedro dos Santos Soares died in the early hours of 10 May 1975 in a car accident, together with his wife. They were in a car on the motorway near Vila Franca de Xira, to the north of Lisbon, when it was rammed by a vehicle at high speed. The other car did not stop. In January 2015, the Portuguese Communist Party celebrated Pedro Soares' birth centenary with the unveiling of a plaque in the village of Trigaches, recording the work of both Soares and Costa Dias.
