= Electoral history of the Portuguese Communist Party =

This is a table of the electoral results of the Portuguese Communist Party. Despite the Party had been founded in 1921, the party experienced little time as a legal party, being forced into clandestinity after a military coup in 1926. In the following decades, Portugal was dominated by the dictatorial regime led by António Oliveira Salazar, that kept the Party illegal. Although the regime allowed elections during some periods, the Party, given its illegal status, could never legally enter the electoral process and the heavy manipulation of the electoral results never allowed a democratic candidate to win. The regime would only end in 1974, with the Carnation Revolution, that implemented broad democratic changes in the country.

Since then, four types of elections are held with different periodicity. The head of state, the President of the Republic, is elected for a five-year term, the Parliament is elected for a four-year term, like the municipal administrations, that since 1985, are also elected for a four-year term. Azores and Madeira elect a regional parliament each four years. Along with these, European elections are also held with a periodicity of five years since the country joined the European Union in 1986.

Since the revolution, the Party participated in every election, from the late 1970s until 1987, it ran in coalition with the Portuguese Democratic Movement in the United People Alliance (APU). In 1987, the APU was disbanded and since then, the Party participated in coalition with the Ecologist Party "The Greens" (PEV) inside the Unitary Democratic Coalition (CDU). The peak of the Party's electoral influence was from the Carnation Revolution until the early 1980s, since then, and mainly after the fall of the Socialist bloc in eastern Europe, the Party's electoral success was reduced, however, it still keeps a presence in the Parliament and still holds the presidency of 18 municipalities and several parishes.

== Results ==
=== Results in parliamentary elections ===
CDU sticker: "Mark your calendar and tell your friends: on 13 June, vote CDU for the European Parliament"

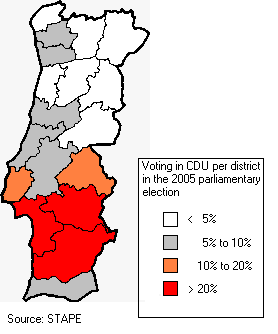
CDU results in the parliamentary election of 2005. (Azores and Madeira are not shown)

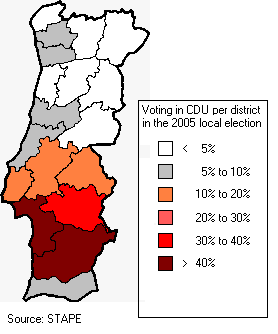
CDU results in the local election of 2005. (Azores and Madeira are not shown)

Results in Parliamentary Elections (year links to election page)
Year	Coalition	Votes	%	Mandates
1976	none	785,594	14.6%	40
1979	APU	1,121,374	19.0%	47 (44)
1980	APU	1,000,975	17.0%	41 (39)
1983	APU	1,024,475	18.2%	44 (41)
1985	APU	893,216	15.6%	38 (35)
1987	CDU	685,109	12.2%	31 (29)
1991	CDU	501,840	8.8%	17 (15)
1995	CDU	504,007	8.6%	15 (13)
1999	CDU	483,716	9.0%	17 (15)
2002	CDU	378,640	7.0%	12 (10)
2005	CDU	432,009	7.6%	14 (12)
2009	CDU	446,174	7.9%	15 (13)
2011	CDU	440,850	7.9%	16 (14)
2015	CDU	444,907	8.3%	17 (15)
2019	CDU	332,018	6.3%	12 (10)
2022	CDU	238,920	4.3%	6
2024	CDU	205,551	3.2%	4
2025	CDU	183,686	2.9%	3

Note:

- The 1975 elections was the Portuguese Constituent Assembly election, as such it is not counted as a regular parliamentary election.
- In brackets is the number of MPs elected by the PCP in the total elected by CDU.
- In 1991 the overall number of MPs changed from the original 250 to 230.
- In the 2022 legislative election all the elected members from the CDU lists were PCP members.

=== Results in local elections ===
Results in Local Elections (year links to election page)
Year	Coalition	Votes	%	Mandates	Mayors
1976	FEPU	720,499	17.7%	268	37
1979	APU	885,899	19.9%	316	50
1982	APU	1,038,033	20.9%	316	55
1985	APU	935,897	19.6%	303	47
1989	CDU	656,719	13.3%	258	50
1993	CDU	689,923	12.8%	246	49
1997	CDU	643,956	12.0%	236	41
2001	CDU	557,481	10.6%	199	28
2005	CDU	589,384	10.9%	203	32
2009	CDU	537,329	9.7%	174	28
2013	CDU	552,690	11.1%	213	34
2017	CDU	489,189	9.5%	171	24
2021	CDU	410,666	8.2%	148	19
2025	CDU	316,273	5.7%	93	12

Note:

- The Local election results report the voting for the Municipal Chambers only and don't include occasional coalitions in some municipalities, e.g. in Lisbon, between 1989 and 2001. Voting for the Municipal Assemblies and Parish Assemblies is usually higher (11.7% and 12.0%, respectively, in 2005).
- The mayor of Setúbal since 2021 is a member of the PEV, another party from the CDU electoral coalition. The remaining 18 elected mayors are members of the PCP.

=== Results in European Parliament elections ===
These are the results for Unitary Democratic Coalition, composed of the PCP, the PEV and the ID.

Election year	# of overall votes	% of overall vote	# of overall seats won	+/-	Notes
1987	646,640	11.50 (#4)	3 / 24		
1989	594,961	14.41 (#3)	4 / 24	▲1	PEV member Maria Amélia Santos was elected in the CDU list.
1994	339,283	11.19 (#4)	3 / 25	▼1	PEV member Maria Amélia Santos lost her seat.
1999	357,575	10.32 (#3)	2 / 25	▼1	
2004	309,406	9.09 (#3)	2 / 24	0	
2009	379,787	10.64 (#4)	2 / 22	0	
2014	416,446	12.68 (#3)	3 / 21	▲1	
2019	228,157	6.88 (#4)	2 / 21	▼1	
2024	162,630	4.12 (#6)	1 / 21	▼1	

(source: Portuguese Electoral Commission)

Note:

- In 2004, after the enlargement of the European Union, the number of MEPs elected by Portugal decreased from the original 25 to 24, to 22 in 2009 and it further decreased to 21 in 2014.

Coalitions Info:

- The FEPU was composed of the PCP, the MDP/CDE and the FSP;
- The APU was composed of the PCP and the MDP/CDE, later it included the PEV;
- The CDU is composed of the PCP and the PEV.

=== Results in presidential elections ===
Results in Presidential Elections (year links to election page)
Year	Candidate supported	Votes	%	Elected?
1976	Octávio Rodrigues Pato	365,344	7.6%	No
1980	Carlos Alfredo de Brito	withdrew	-	No
1986	Francisco Salgado Zenha	1,185,867	20.6%	No
1991	Carlos Alberto Carvalhas	635,867	12.9%	No
1996	Jerónimo Carvalho de Sousa	withdrew	-	No
2001	António Simões de Abreu	221,886	5.1%	No
2006	Jerónimo Carvalho de Sousa	466,428	8.6%	No
2011	Francisco Lopes	300,921	7.1%	No
2016	Edgar Silva	183,051	3.9%	No
2021	João Ferreira	179,764	4.3%	No

Notes:

- In 1980, Carlos Brito withdrew in favour of Ramalho Eanes.
- In 1986, the Party's first candidate was Ângelo Veloso, that later withdrew in favour of Salgado Zenha.
- In 1986, in the second round, the Party supported Mário Soares.
- In 1996, Jerónimo de Sousa withdrew in favour of Jorge Sampaio.

== See also ==
- Portuguese Communist Party
- History of the Portuguese Communist Party
- History of Portugal
- Carnation Revolution
