= Universidade Lusófona =

Private university in Lisbon, Portugal

Coordinates: 38.7581°N 9.1519°W

Lusophone University of Humanities and Technologies
- Universidade Lusófona de Humanidades e Tecnologias
- Motto: Humani nihil alienum
- Type: Private University
- Established: 1987
- Rector: José Bragança de Miranda
- Students: 9,195 (2017/18)
- Location: Lisbon, Portugal
- Campus: Urban
- Website: www.ulusofona.pt

Universidade Lusófona (Lusophone University) is the largest private university in Portugal. It is also the main institution of Grupo Lusófona, which administers other universities and colleges in Portugal, Brazil, Cape Verde, Angola, Guinea-Bissau and Mozambique. Promotion of the Portuguese language is seen as a major objective of the institution; students from former Portuguese African colonies pay substantially reduced fees.

== History ==
The Universidade Lusofona started in 1987 in Lisbon and is the property of Grupo Lusófona a Portuguese private investor group geared at developing higher education institutions in Lusophone countries. Since then, Universidade Lusófona has opened semi-autonomous offshoots in Porto, Luanda, Mindelo (2007). The Instituto Superior Manuel Teixeira Gomes (ISMAT), is a private higher education establishment that belongs to the Lusófona Group, located in Portimão, Portugal, and founded as such in 2004 from older private higher education institutions previously operating in the city.

In 2024, UL had more than 16,900 students and 1,671 teaching staff; UL offered 65 Bachelor programmes, 84 Masters courses and 13 PhD programmes.

In 2024, courses are accredited by A3ES.

In 2024, its highest ranking faculties were Veterinary, Arts & Humanities and Psychology.

== Courses offered ==
=== First Cycle of the Bologna process ("licenciatura" or undergraduate degree) ===
==== Department of Architecture, Urban Planning, Geography and Plastic Arts ====
- Architecture
- Geography and Development
- Urban Planning and Territorial Management

==== Department of Social and Human Sciences ====
- Political Science and International Relations
- Education Sciences
- Religious Sciences
- European Studies and International Relations
- Lusophone Studies
- Philosophy
- History
- Social Service
- Sociology
- Translation and Interpretation
- Tourism

==== Department of Communication Sciences, Architecture, Arts, and Information Technology ====
- Cinema, Video, and Multimedia Communication
- Communication and Culture Sciences
- Marketing, Advertising, and Public Relations
- Digital Animation
- Design
- Graphic Production and Design
- Photography
- Computer Engineering
- Communication and Arts
- Communication and Journalism
- Business Management Computing

==== Department of Health Sciences ====
- Pharmaceutical Sciences
- Health Unit Management

==== Department of Law ====
- Law

==== Department of Physical Education, Sports, and Leisure ====
- Physical Education and Sports

==== Department of Engineering and Natural Sciences ====
- Biology
- Ocean Sciences
- Chemistry
- Biotechnological Engineering
- Civil Engineering
- Environmental Engineering
- Electronic Engineering
- Industrial Management and Engineering
- Food Engineering
- Mathematics
- Biochemistry
- Biotechnology

==== Department of Veterinary Medicine ====
- Veterinary Medicine

==== Department of Psychology ====
- Psychology

==== Department of Economy and Management ====
- Accounting
- Economy
- Business Management
- Human Resources Management

=== Second Cycle of the Bologna process (master's degrees) ===
==== Department of Architecture, Urban Planning, Geography and Plastic Arts ====
- Advanced Studies in Architecture
- Geography and Development
- Museology
- Urban Planning

==== Department of Social and Human Sciences ====
- Education Scienceslll
- Political Science
- Science of Religions
- Special Education
- Literary Translation Studies
- Philosophy
- Social Service and Social Policy
- Sociology
- Lusophony and International Relations
- Political, Economic and Social Lusophone History
- Tourism

==== Department of Communication Sciences, Arts, and Information Technology ====
- Communication Sciences, Marketing, and Advertising
- Institutional Communication
- Alternative Communication and Support Systems
- Communication and Culture Sciences
- Film Studies
- Journalism, Politics, and Contemporary History
- Creation and Production in Technological Arts
- Multimedia Communication Systems
- Software Engineering and Information Systems
- Kino Eyes - The European Movie Masters - Erasmus Mundus Joint Master
- Docnomads - Erasmus Mundus Joint Master

==== Department of Health Sciences ====
- Dermatological and Cosmetic Sciences
- Pharmaceutical Sciences
- Pharmaceutical Care

==== Department of Law ====
- Law

==== Department of Physical Education, Sports, and Leisure ====
- Young Sportspeople Training
- Pedagogical Supervision in Physical Education and Sports

==== Department of Engineering and Natural Sciences ====
- Developmental Biology
- Engineering and Ocean Studies
- Environmental Engineering

==== Department of Veterinary Medicine ====
- Veterinary Medicine

==== Department of Psychology ====
- Education Psychology
- Psychology, Counselling and Psychotherapy
- Sexual Psychology
- Criminal Psychology and Social Exclusion
- Psychology in International and Inter-cultural environments

==== Department of Economy and Management ====
- Business Management
- Economy

=== Third Cycle of the Bologna process (doctor's degree) ===
==== Department of Architecture, Urban Planning, Geography and Plastic Arts ====
- Museology

==== Department of Social and Human Sciences ====
- Education
- Political Science
- Philosophy - Contemporary Thought

==== Department of Engineering and Natural Sciences ====
- Mathematics (Physics-Mathematics]

==== Department of Psychology ====
- Clinical Neuropsychology

== Instituto Superior Manuel Teixeira Gomes ==
The Instituto Superior Manuel Teixeira Gomes (ISMAT), is a private higher education establishment that belongs to the Lusófona Group, located in Portimão, Algarve region, Portugal, resulting from the merger between ISMAG and ISHT of Portimão in 2004. The main mission of the institute is to widen the offer of higher education in the western Algarve region. ISMAT's strategic objectives are to provide university courses and to develop research in the most different areas of specialization, with particular emphasis on scientific and technical fields that can contribute to the development of the Algarve region, that can respond to regional needs in terms of human resources training, and that can meet the most pressing regional development needs. The teaching institution was established in 2004 and is named after Manuel Teixeira Gomes, a Portuguese politician, diplomat and writer from Portimão who served as President of Portugal between 1923 and 1925. As of 2021, ISMAT awards degrees in fields such as architecture, data science, computer engineering, law, psychology and sports science. Besides research and teaching endeavors, the institution dynamizes the city's society through workshops and expositions it organizes. Among its teaching staff, ISMAT has counted with some notable individualities of the Algarve such as Cândida Ventura and Carlos Lopez Cano Vieira.
