= José Gregório =

Portuguese politician

- Born: March 19, 1908; Marinha Grande, Portugal
- Died: March 1961; Prague, Czechoslovakia
- Occupations: Glassmaker, trade unionist
- Known for: Leader of the 1934 Marinha Grande strike; member of the Portuguese Communist Party

José Gregório (born 19 March 1908, in Marinha Grande; died March 1961 in Prague) was a Portuguese glassmaker in Marinha Grande, a center of the glass industry in the country, a trade unionist and a member of the Portuguese Communist Party. He became notable for being one of the leaders of the labour strike his hometown against the dictatorial regime in 1934.

During the 1930s, the Party was the major force in the resistance against the dictatorial regime led by António de Oliveira Salazar. After the approval by the government of a law forbidding the free trade unions, several strikes and riots began all over the country. In Marinha Grande, the workers, in a riot led by the Gregório and other members of the Party, controlled the entire town. Only a massive intervention by the military ended the strike.

In 1938, Gregório was arrested by the PIDE, the political police, and was tortured for several times during his imprisonment. Released in 1940, Gregório had an important role in the reorganization of the Party in the early 1940s. In 1943, he became a member of the Party's secretariat and presented reports related to the Party's work among the trade unions in the 3rd and 4th congresses.

José Gregório died in 1961, after living more than 20 years clandestinely, due to the persecution of the political police.

Portuguese Wiki reports that in 1956, already seriously ill for cardiac reasons, he emigrated to Czechoslovakia for treatment, dying 5 years later in March 1961 in Prague. On January 18, 1975, his remains were taken to his homeland, with thousands at the funeral ceremony
