= Bento António Gonçalves =

Bento Gonçalves
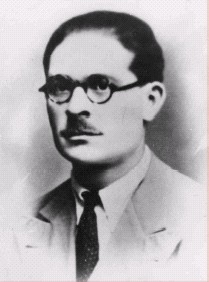

General Secretary of the Portuguese Communist Party
- In office 21 April 1929 – 11 September 1942
- Preceded by: José Carlos Rates
- Succeeded by: Álvaro Cunhal

Personal details
- Born: Bento António Gonçalves; 2 March 1902 Montalegre, Portugal
- Died: 11 September 1942 (aged 40) Tarrafal, Cape Verde
- Party: Portuguese Communist Party

For the city named Bento Gonçalves in Brazil, see Bento Gonçalves, Rio Grande do Sul

Bento António Gonçalves (2 March 1902 – 11 September 1942) was the second General Secretary of the Portuguese Communist Party. He was born in Montalegre, Vila Real District, in the north of Portugal.

In 1922 he joined the navy and one year later he started the elementary pilot course. In 1924 he was sent to the Portuguese colony of Angola and worked in the Luanda railroad company where he became an activist organizing the Union of Luanda's Workers.

In 1926 he returned to Lisbon.where he became a member of the Navy Workers Labor Union.

In September 1928 he joined the Portuguese Communist Party and became a member of the cell of the Arsenal of Alfeite. In 1929 he participated in the reorganizative conference of the Communist Party and was elected to the provisional Central Commission. Soon after, he became Secretary General.

In 1930 he was arrested by the political police of the Estado Novo regime and was forced to live in the Azores. One year later he was transferred to Portuguese Cape Verde. In 1933 he returned to Portugal and went underground.

In 1935, Bento Gonçalves participated in the 7th Congress of the Comintern. Soon after returning to Portugal he was arrested again by the political police. After that he was transferred to a prison in the Azores where he was put on trial by a military court for his communist activities. In the end of the year he was transferred to the prison camp in Tarrafal, where he died of sickness in 1942.
