= Alfredo Dinis =

Portuguese politician

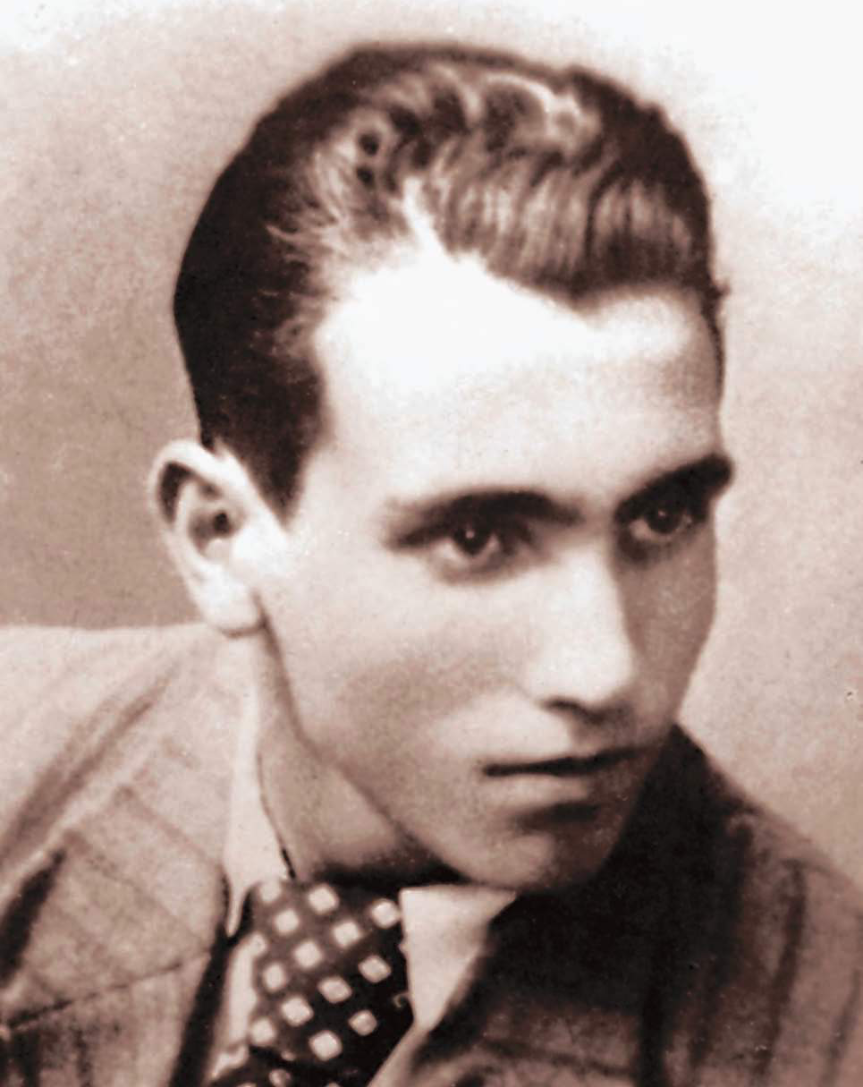
Alfredo Dinis ("Alex")

Alfredo Dinis, often known by his nom de guerre, "Alex", was a notable Portuguese anti-fascist and member of the Portuguese Communist Party who was murdered in 1945 by the PIDE (Policia Internacional de Defesa do Estado).

Dinis was a metallurgical worker who joined the Communist Youth in 1936, aged 19. In August 1938 he was arrested by the PIDE. After spending 19 months in jail, upon release he became responsible for the Party's local committee in Almada, a suburb of Lisbon. In 1942, he was one of the major stimulators of the vast wave of strikes and demonstrations that swept the region of Lisbon, which were brutally repressed due to the criminal character of the Portuguese fascist regime.

In 1943, Dinis was present in the Party's 3rd Congress and was elected to the Central Committee. In 1944, he was again involved in the wave of strikes carried out in May. In 1945, shortly before being murdered, was elected to the Party's Political Bureau.

Alfredo Dinis was killed by the political police near Sintra, on 4 July 1945.
