= Mário Sacramento =

Mário Emílio de Morais Sacramento (7 July 1920 – 27 March 1969) was a Portuguese physician and essayist that became famous for his antifascist activities against the dictatorial regime led by Oliveira Salazar in Portugal.

Sacramento was born in Ílhavo, Aveiro District and studied medicine in Coimbra, Lisbon, Porto and finally graduated in Paris. He started his writing activity very soon and became a regular contributor to several newspapers and magazines, such as "O Diabo" (The Devil), "Sol Nascente" (Rising Sun), "Vértice" (vertex) or the "Diário de Lisboa" (Lisbon Daily).

Sacramento also published several essays about Eça de Queiroz, Moniz Barreto, Cesário Verde, Fernando Namora or Fernando Pessoa, that made him become a respected person among the Portuguese intellectuals.

Due to his intellectual activities and Anti-fascist and democratic feelings, Sacramento soon developed connections to the Portuguese Communist Party, at the time, the only organized resistance movement against the dictatorship. Because of that he became a member of the Central Commission of the youth wing of the Movement of Democratic Unity (Portuguese: Movimento de Unidade Democrática - Juvenil or MUD), the only opposition movement "allowed" by the regime, that congregated almost all those who were against the dictatorship. There, he developed his political activities and became famous among the democratic resistance. He was one of the main organizers of the 1st and 2nd Republican Congresses in Aveiro, congresses that in a somewhat secret way, set important guidelines to the anti-fascist struggle, and was honored in the 3rd, that was only carried out after his death.

Sacramento was arrested a total of five times by the political police, the PIDE. The first time was in 1938, when he was a member of the students union in a high school in Aveiro.

Today, Mário Sacramento remains one of Aveiro’s most prominent figures, with his name being memorialized in several places like schools, streets and avenues.
