= José Carlos Rates =

Portuguese politician (1879–1961)

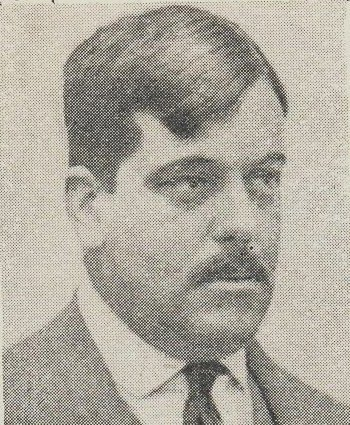

Secretary General of the Portuguese Communist Party
- In office November 1923 – October 1925

Personal details
- Born: 19 February 1879 Setúbal, Portugal
- Died: 21 January 1961 (aged 81) Lisbon, Portugal
- Party: Portuguese Communist Party (1921–1926); National Union (1931–1961)
- Occupation: Trade union leader, politician, journalist

José Carlos Rates (19 February 1879 – 21 January 1961) was a Portuguese politician and trade union leader. He served as General Secretary of the Portuguese Communist Party between 1923 and 1925.

== Biography ==
Rates was born into a poor family in Setúbal. He began working at a canning factory at 15, before enlisting in the navy at 17. During his time in the navy Rates was introduced to the works of the Russian anarchist Peter Kropotkin, and his military record was marked by rebelliousness against his superiors. This would result in disciplinary actions against him, and he was eventually sent to the Portuguese overseas territories as punishment.

After returning to Setúbal Rates again took up work in the canning industry, and was active as a trade union organizer. He embraced communist ideas in the wake of the October Revolution in Russia, and joined the Portuguese Maximalist Federation. In 1921 he took part in the foundation of the Portuguese Communist Party; he was elected General Secretary in 1923 with support from Jules Humbert-Droz, a Swiss communist tasked by the Communist International to solve internal divisions within the party.

As leader of the Communist Party's "moderate" wing, which was opposed to the idea of a communist revolution in Portugal unless in the context of a world revolution, Rates was removed as General Secretary in October 1925, following further internal struggles. In 1926 he was recruited as editor of O Século; as this position was incompatible with the statutes of the Communist International, Rates was expelled from the party altogether in May of the same year. Although he initially remained a leftist politician, he joined the National Union, the sole legal party under the Estado Novo regime led by António de Oliveira Salazar, in 1931.
