= Álvaro Cunhal =

Former leader of the Portuguese Communist Party (1913–2005)

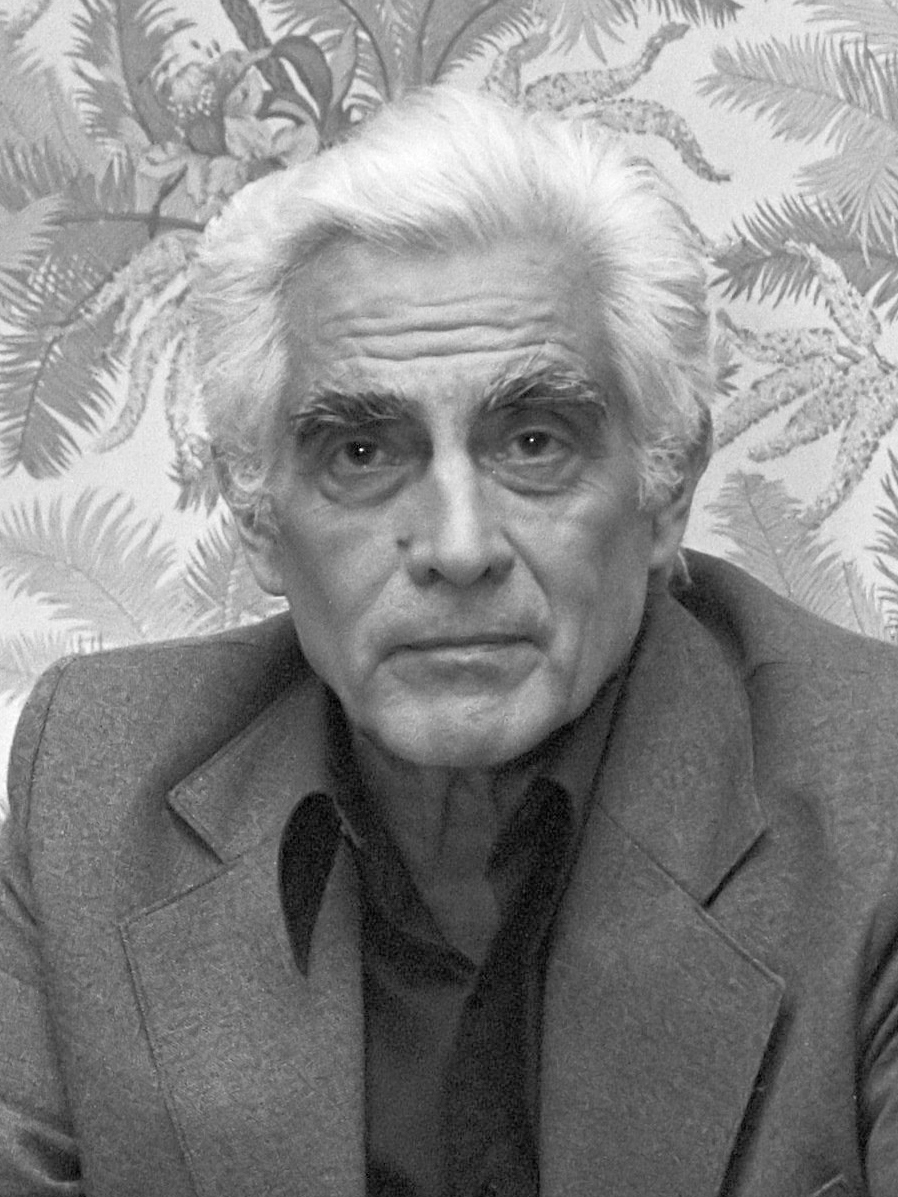
- Cunhal in 1980

Minister without Portfolio
- In office 16 May 1974 – 8 August 1975
- Prime Minister: Adelino da Palma Carlos; Vasco Gonçalves
- Preceded by: Office established
- Succeeded by: Jorge Campinos (politician)

General Secretary of the Portuguese Communist Party
- In office 31 March 1961 – 5 December 1992
- Preceded by: Bento Gonçalves
- Succeeded by: Carlos Carvalhas

Member of the Assembly of the Republic
- In office 3 June 1976 – 12 August 1987
- Constituency: Lisbon

Personal details
- Born: Álvaro Barreirinhas Cunhal; 10 November 1913 Coimbra, Portugal
- Died: 13 June 2005 (aged 91) Lisbon, Portugal
- Party: Portuguese Communist Party (1931–2005)
- Domestic partner: Isaura Moreira (1960–1965)
- Relations: Maria Eugénia Cunhal (sister)
- Children: Ana Cunhal
- Education: University of Lisbon

Álvaro Barreirinhas Cunhal (Portuguese pronunciation: [ˈalvɐɾu kuˈɲal]; 10 November 1913 – 13 June 2005) was a Portuguese communist revolutionary, writer and politician. He was one of the major opponents of the corporatist regime of the Estado Novo. He served as secretary-general of the Portuguese Communist Party (PCP) from 1961 to 1992.

== Early life ==
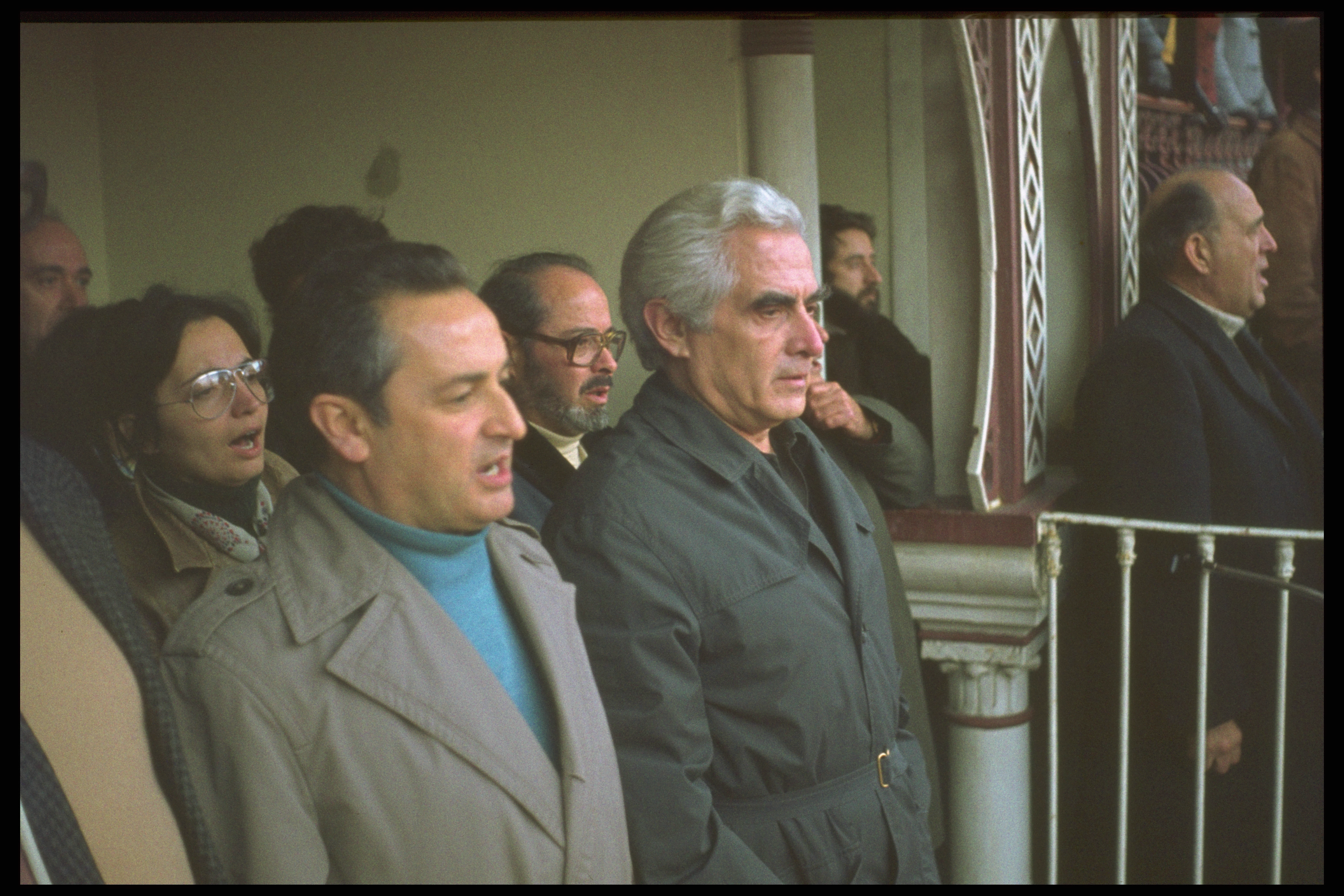
Cunhal, Portuguese Communist Party Secretary-General, with Octávio Pato, its presidential candidate, at Campo Pequeno, Lisbon, 1976

Cunhal's funeral in Lisbon

Cunhal was born in Coimbra on 10 November 1913, the son of Avelino Henriques da Costa Cunhal (Seia, 28 October 1887 – Coimbra, Sé Nova, 19 December 1966) and Mercedes Simões Ferreira Barreirinhas (Coimbra, Sé Nova, 5 May 1888 – Lisbon, 12 September 1971). His parents were married in Coimbra on 22 August 1908. He was the third of four children: António José (Coimbra, 1909–1933), Maria Mansueta (1912–1921) and Maria Eugénia (1927–2015). The family moved to Seia when Cunhal was three years old. He studied at home with his father, who was a lawyer and writer, and from 1918 the municipal administrator.

"In Seia, the first day of school I went was a spectacle of savagery, slaps given out and kids hit with rulers. In that school, that's how the education was. After I left school and went home, I told my father what I saw, and so I did not return to school."

Cunhal was baptized on 5 May 1919 in Seia; his godfather was his older brother António José, then 10, and the godmother was Imaculada Conceição.

When he was a child, he accompanied his mother to church every Sunday, she had a religious way of thinking and living. His father, held a liberal mindset and was the origin of Cunhal's "irreverent and creative personality". His father denounced feudal titles and relations between the aristocracy and the priesthood. His sister, Eugénia Cunhal, despite the pervasive rejection of the religious world in Cunhal's political life, talked about the "opening of their father's spirit" when he "showed his children the Old Testament and appealed to each of them to form their own conscience". His father's republicanism cemented in Cunhal's personality a feeling of "social solidarity" and "political nonconformity". Both Álvaro and Maria Eugénia would later denounce religion.

His sister Maria Mansueta died 13 January 1921, at nine years old, of tuberculosis, and a year later his father became the governor of the district of Guarda. In 1924, the family moved to Lisbon, initially to Pinheiro Chagas Street, where Maria Eugénia was born in 1927. Later they would move to a bigger house in Benfica, in Grão Vasco Avenue, when António was already gravely ill. The need for more space due to the contagiousness of tuberculosis would have been a catalyst for the move. António José would die at 24, in 1932, of tuberculosis and lung grangrene. After his brother's death, the family moved again to the centre of Lisbon, first to the 5 de Outubro Avenue, and then to the Miguel Bombarda Avenue, place where Avelino and Eugénia would years later be arrested by PIDE.

After moving to Lisbon in 1924, he took the Pedro Nunes Lyceum admission exam. In 1929, he transferred to the Camões Secondary School. He played football on the right winger; as well as chess, checkers, and card games, and practiced track and field, while also taking part in the publishing of children's books. His experiences in track and field would become useful when he had to live clandestinely, as he had to travel thousand of kilometers on a bicycle to communicate with Communist Party members.

He ended secondary school with an average score of 13, then studied law at the University of Lisbon in 1931, right after turning 18. His first engagement with Marxism occurred at this point, and gradual contact with the Portuguese Communist Party (PCP) came through books and newspapers. In the PCP, his initial reference and mentor was Bento Gonçalves.

== Political career ==
He visited the Soviet Union for the first time in 1935 to attend the Seventh World Congress of the Comintern in Moscow. He joined the Central Committee of the party in 1936. His first arrest occurred in 1937, at the age of 23.

While in prison in July 1940, Cunhal submitted his final thesis on the topic of abortion and obtained his law degree (the jury included future Prime Minister Marcello Caetano, who would later replace Salazar). In his thesis, Cunhal supported the legalisation of abortion in Portugal, while he also scrutinised the case of abortion in the Soviet Union, which had been made legal under Lenin but was outlawed once again by Stalin in 1936. Cunhal claimed abortion was no longer practised in the Soviet Union and thus supported this change, but contrasted this with Portugal, highlighting the dangers and social costs of illegal abortions in his country and exploring the reasons that led women to decide to end their pregnancy. He then taught for some months at the Colégio Moderno, in Lisbon. Among his pupils was the future President of Portugal, Mário Soares, who would become one of his great political rivals after the 1974 revolution.

From 1941 to 1949, Cunhal lived "underground" and became de facto party leader. Arrested by the PIDE in 1949, he remained in prison for 11 years until escaping from the seaside Peniche Fortress prison in 1960. The government of António Salazar claimed that a Soviet submarine was near the Peniche coast waiting for Cunhal. In 1961, Cunhal was elected as the party's secretary-general, following the death of Bento Gonçalves in the political prisoners colony of Tarrafal in Cape Verde. Cunhal lived in exile in Moscow, where his daughter, Ana Cunhal, was born on December 25, 1960, and in Paris until the Carnation Revolution of April 1974.

Back in Portugal, Cunhal took charge of the newly-legalized Portuguese Communist Party and led the party through the political upheavals which followed the revolution. He was minister without portfolio in several of the provisional governments which followed the revolution of 1974. A faction of army officers seen as aligned with the party dominated the post-revolutionary provisional governments, with the pro-communist prime minister Vasco Gonçalves leading four provisional governments, which brought accusations that the party was attempting to take power via the military. Cunhal was largely responsible for the party's hardline attitude, particularly its hostility towards the Socialist Party led by Soares, which prevented the formation of a united left.

Cunhal left his office in 1992. Succeeded by Carlos Carvalhas, he remained influential within the party in the following years, consistently siding with the party's orthodox wing. He also revealed that under the pseudonym Manuel Tiago he had been the author of several neorealist novels. His drawings, made while in prison, were published as was his translation of Shakespeare's King Lear (edited towards the end of his life and originally written under the women's pseudonym Maria Manuela Serpa).

Álvaro Cunhal died in Lisbon in 2005, after several years out of the public eye. His funeral took place on 15 June in Lisbon and was attended by more than 250,000 people.

== Works ==
- IV Congresso do Partido Communista Português — O Caminho Para o Derrubamento do Fascismo.
- Duas intervenções numa reunião de quadros.
- Rumo à Vitória - As Tarefas do Partido na Revolução Democrática e Nacional.
- A Questão do Estado, Questão Central de Cada Revolução.
- A Verdade e a Mentira sobre a Revolução de Abril.
- Acção Revolucionária, Capitulação e Aventura.
- O Partido Com Paredes de Vidro.
- A Revolução Portuguesa - O Passado e o Futuro.
- Fracasso e Derrota do Governo de Direita do PSD/Cavaco Silva.
- O 1º Governo PSD e a Resistência Democrática.
- Falência da Política de Direita do PS (1983–1985).
- Os Chamados Governos de Iniciativa Presidencial.

=== Fiction works under the pseudonym Manuel Tiago ===
First acknowledged in 1995, Cunhal published fictional works under the pseudonym Manuel Tiago. He also illustrated the original edition of Esteiros by Soeiro Pereira Gomes. His novels have appeared in English, translated by Eric A. Gordon and released by International Publishers.

- Até Amanhã, Camaradas (adapted to television series in 2005). In English as: Until Tomorrow, Comrades (2023)
- Cinco Dias, Cinco Noites (adapted to film in 1996). In English as: Five Days, Five Nights (2020)
- A Estrela de Seis Pontas. In English as: The Six-Pointed Star (2020)
- A Casa de Eulália. In English as: Eulalia's House (2021)
- Lutas e Vidas. Um conto.
- Os Corrécios e outros Contos. In English as: The Slackers and Other Stories (2021)
- Um Risco na Areia. In English as: A Line in the Sand (2022)
- Fronteiras. In English as: Border Crossings (2021)
- Sala 3 e outros contos. In English as: The 3rd Floor and Other Stories of the Portuguese Resistance (2021), includes Lutas e Vidas (Struggle and Life)

== See also ==
- Armed Revolutionary Action
- Electoral history of the Portuguese Communist Party
