= Tarrafal concentration camp =

Concentration camp in Chão Bom, Santiago, Cape Verde

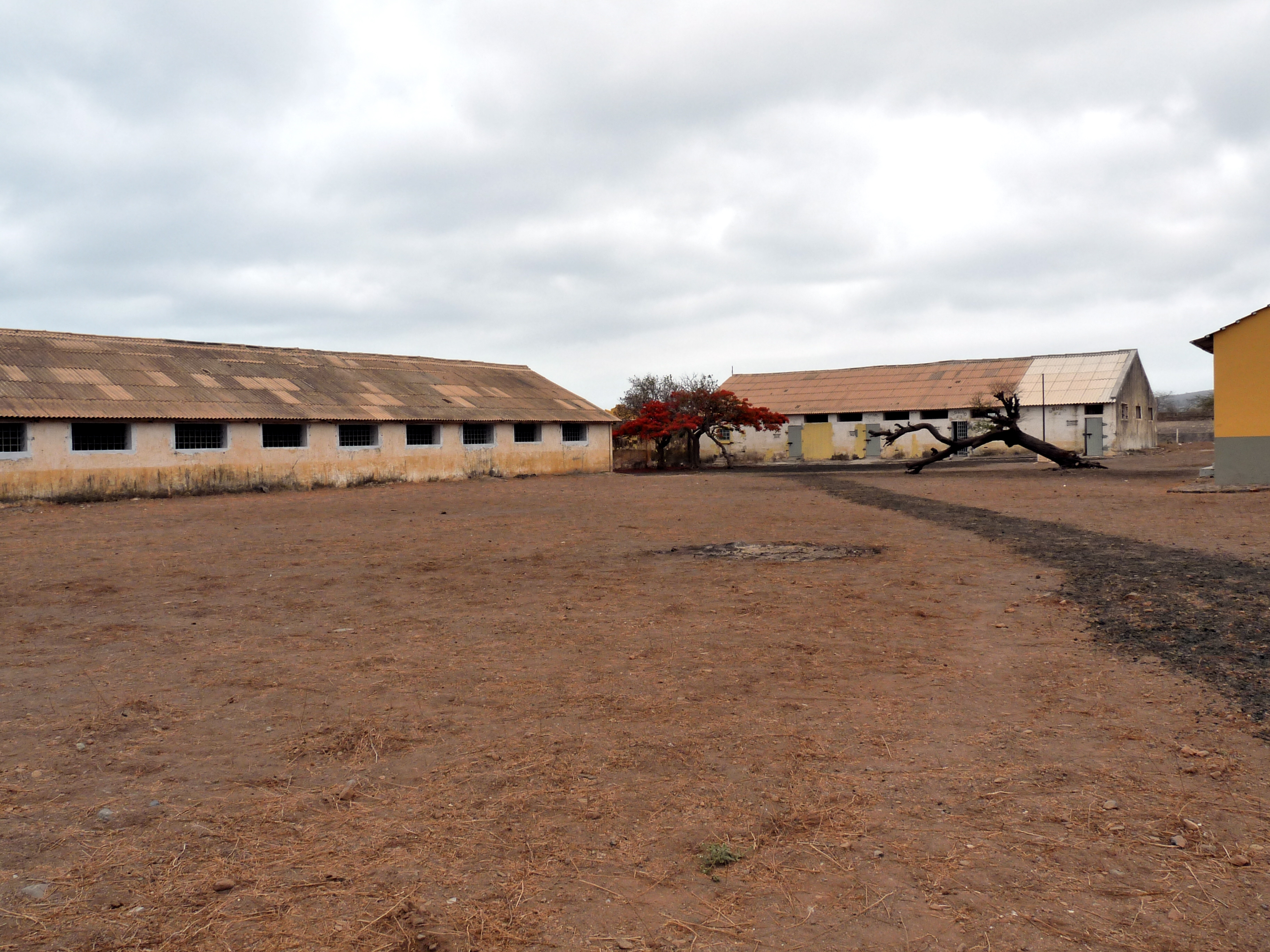
- Interior of the concentration camp
- Interactive map of Tarrafal concentration camp
- Location: Cape Verde, Santiago, Chão Bom; 15°15′51″N 23°44′38″W
- Status: Closed, transformed into the "Resistance Museum"
- Security class: Maximum
- Opened: 23 April 1936
- Closed: 1 May 1974
- Managed by: PVDE, PIDE

Tarrafal was a concentration camp located in the village of Chão Bom, in the Municipality of Tarrafal, on the island of Santiago in Cape Verde.

It was established in 1936, during a reorganization process of the Portuguese Estado Novo prison system, with the goal of incarcerating political and social prisoners. The location was strategically chosen, both for being remote so that testimonies would not come to light, and for having an unhealthy climate, with little drinking water, and many mosquitoes in rainy seasons, which facilitated the appearance of diseases. Its main objective was to physically and psychologically annihilate Portuguese and African opponents of the Salazar dictatorship, isolating them from the rest of the world in subhuman conditions of captivity, mistreatment, and insalubrity.

Ideologically Tarrafal had two purposes. First, it would be used to remove and isolate political prisoners who disrupted mainland prisons through protests and sit-ins. Second, the camp would have harsh conditions to send a clear message to the opposition in Portugal that Salazar's authoritarian regime would not tolerate any kind of political dissent. These objectives were clearly defined in the opening paragraphs of Decree-Law No. 26539 (Decreto-Lei n.º 26 539), the law that was enacted to build the Tarrafal Prison. It stated that the camp – which would be under the control of the PVDE (Polícia de Vigilância e de Defesa do Estado: Portugal's Secret Police) – was only for the exiling of political and social prisoners who had disrupted other prisons and were considered a "harmful element" to other inmates.

Its first phase, from 1936 to 1954, was aimed at Portuguese opponents. On 29 October 1936, the first 157 detainees arrived from Lisbon, some of them participants in the Sailors' Revolt of 1936. In the first two years, when the prisoners' only housing was canvas tents, they were forced to work for 45 days in extremely high temperatures to build the camp wall and other infrastructure. When the first illnesses began to appear, the only doctor present had no medicine to treat the patients, so he limited himself to issuing death certificates. Of the 340 Portuguese who passed through the camp, 34 died. Notable victims include Bento Gonçalves, then leader of the Portuguese Communist Party, and Mário Castelhano, then leader of the General Confederation of Labor. The "Frigideira" (English: "frying pan"), also called "elimination chamber" or "torture chamber" by the prisoners, was a place of punishment where prisoners were tortured, deprived of food, and light, and forced to suffer temperatures between 50 and 60 degrees Celsius (120-140 degrees Fahrenheit). The "Frigideira" was responsible for the death of 30 prisoners, and the sickness of dozens of others. The current museum states prisoners cumulatively spent 2824 days in the "Frigideira".

In the second phase, which reopened the camp on 14 April 1961, it began to hold militants from the national liberation struggles of the Portuguese Colonial War in Angola, Guinea-Bissau, and Cape Verde. 106 Angolans, 100 Guineans, and 20 Cape Verdeans went through Tarrafal. Replacing the "Frigideira", the "Holandinha" was opened, with almost the same objective, being "a little taller than a man standing, a little longer than a man lying down, a little wider than a man sitting down, with a small barred window" and "a real oven". One Angolan and two Guinean political prisoners died in this camp.

Following the Carnation Revolution in 1974, together with the end of the Estado Novo dictatorship, the camp was closed one week later. In 2009 it was transformed into the Museum of Resistance, and a project is currently underway with the aim of applying for the UNESCO World Heritage List. On 14 August 2016, the government of Cape Verde recognized the Tarrafal Concentration Camp in Santiago and its dependencies as a National Heritage Site of the Republic of Cape Verde. In honor of the anti-fascist struggle and resistance in Cape Verde, 29 October was consecrated as "Antifascist Resistance Day".

== Names ==
The camp was called "Tarrafal concentration camp" (Portuguese: campo de concentração do Tarrafal) and informally as the "Slow Death Camp" (Portuguese: campo da morte lenta) or "Tarrafal Camp" (Portuguese: campo do Tarrafal). The official name of the camp was "Cape Verde Penal Colony" (Portuguese: colónia penal de Cabo Verde) in the first phase, and "Chão Bom Labor Camp" (Portuguese: campo de trabalho de Chão Bom) in the second one. It was also referred to as the "Village of Death", the "Swamp of Death", and as the "Yellow Inferno".

== History ==
=== Foundation ===
The Tarrafal Concentration Camp was established in 1936 by Decree 26:539 of 23 April 1936, in the context of Estado Novo's reorganization of the prison system, with the purpose of incarcerating political and social prisoners. The location was chosen strategically, both because it was remote so that testimonies would not come to public attention, and because it had an unhealthy climate, with little drinkable water, and many mosquitoes in rainy seasons, which facilitated the appearance of diseases and from which many prisoners died. The construction was the responsibility of the Ministry of Public Works and Telecommunications, and the project was drawn up by Cottinelli Telmo, with the name "Penal Colony of Cape Verde". Cândido de Oliveira says that the true purpose of the construction was not publicized out of fear of Portuguese and international public opinion. According to the "Dossier do Tarrafal" from the Editorial "Avante!", most of the guards were members of the PSP connected to the PVDE and the Portuguese Legion.

=== Objectives ===
The "Tarrafal Penal Colony" was nicknamed by its prisoners as a concentration camp because it was analogous to the Nazi concentration camps, or "slow death camp", since its main objective was to physically and psychologically annihilate Portuguese and African opponents of the Salazar dictatorship, keeping them away from the rest of the world, in subhuman conditions of captivity, mistreatment and insalubrity. In the first phase, from 1936 to 1954, it was a prison for the opponents of Portugal's regime. Historian Fernando Rosas considers Tarrafal the "peak of repression in Portugal" and the "most brutal form of repression that fascism found" against the resistance, being "a terrain where the struggle of the Portuguese antifascists is joined with the struggle of the anti-colonialists or the patriots of the national liberation movements". The Dictionary of Portuguese History (2000) describes it as an "arbitrary deposit of the regime's opponents", and the "quintessence of state terrorism under Salazar". The way Tarrafal functioned and its method of treating prisoners were similar to those of other concentration camps that existed at the time. On a daily basis, inmates were subjected to punishment, torture, forced labor, poor nutrition, and lack of medical care. Most of the detentions were arbitrary.

The PVDE strongly modeled its camp regime after the Nazi concentration camps. Prisoners were subjected to brutal authority. Strict regulations were enforced and outside information was forbidden. The PVDE used physical and psychological violence against the prisoners, this included sleep deprivation, beatings, and humiliation. Men and women were tortured for information on their organizations and networks in Portugal. The most severe punishment was conducted in a concrete cell called the "Frigideira" (English: "frying pan"). Inside this windowless 6m x3m building, daytime temperatures could reach up to 60 °C. Prisoners could be held inside these blocks for days, weeks, or months. When used elsewhere, being held in cells of this kind had resulted in extreme dehydration, heat exhaustion, and death

=== First phase ===
The first phase lasted from 1936 to 1954. On 29 October 1936, the first 157 Portuguese political prisoners arrived from Lisbon, 37 of them being strikers participating in the strike of 18 January 1934, in Marinha Grande, and some participants in the Sailors' Revolt of 1936, organized by the Revolutionary Organization of the Navy, linked to the Portuguese Communist Party. In the beginning, the facilities were simple canvas tents with the capacity to house twelve prisoners, without any conditions, and the camp was surrounded by barbed wire and a four-meter deep ditch. There was no electricity, ventilation or wind/rain protection. According to the prisoners, due to the unpredictably rainy weather of the location, sometimes the tents would flood and rot. The wooden buildings were reserved for the secretariat and the warehouse. This was done concurrently with the construction of the sheds. Electricity, air renewal, and protection against the natural elements, especially the sun – which is "unbearable due to the country's climatic conditions" – were non-existent. According to Cândido de Oliveira, the barbed wire barred any direct contact with the outside, although it still allowed visual contact. Manuel Franscico Rodrigues affirms that the construction of slopes benefited the guards, restricted space, and increased the psychological torture on the prisoners. The only stone building was the kitchen, which was partially built. Manuel dos Reis, director of the camp for several years, would receive the political prisoners saying "Whoever comes to Tarrafal comes to die!".

According to the Commission of the Black Book on the Fascist Regime, the prison records of some prisoners sent to Tarrafal have not been found, saying that on examining the existing records, "it soon appears that many of them were not even tried and that others, despite having been sentenced, were not sentenced to imprisonment". In 1944, of the 226 prisoners imprisoned there, 72 had not been tried and 55 had already exceeded their sentences.

The first two years in prison were divided into two phases: in the first, called the "wild brigade", the prisoners were subjected to forced labor for 45 days, under extremely high temperatures, to build the walls of the concentration camp, the road, among others. The second, called the "acute period", which began in 1937, was when the first diseases began to appear – such as malaria, bilious and other infectious diseases – and during this period seven prisoners died. In 1937 the first doctor arrived, but, not having any medicine to cure the prisoners, limited himself to just writing death certificates. Today, on the Museum of the Resistance, there's a quote of his: "I am not here to cure, but to sign death certificates".

In the concentration camp of Tarrafal, there were several first-line communist leaders and cadres, subjected to various types of torture, since its establishment in 1936. Due to the large number of communists that came to the camp, the Communist Prison Organization of Tarrafal (OCTP) was quickly created. Here, the prisoners intended to maintain political debate, doctrinal training, analyze and systematize their own recent historical experience, be it the political situation or party line. However, they were faced with several difficulties, namely the lack of paper and pencils. Sometimes the isolation was so great that any information about what was going on in the world was seized upon, even scraps of paper lost on the floor. Most of the time, the newspaper had been used as toilet paper, which earned the name among the inmates of "shit radio", and was vividly used as a source of information.

After six years imprisoned in Tarrafal, in 1942 the leader of the Portuguese Communist Party — Bento Gonçalves — died, along with four other militants.

In January 1954 it was closed due to the increased influence of anti-regime forces and the defeat of Nazism in World War II.

==== The "Frigideira" ====
The "Frigideira" (English: "frying pan") was meant to punish prisoners who disobeyed the rules. Also known as the "elimination chamber", or the "torture chamber", it was the form of punishment that instilled the biggest fear in the prisoners. According to Pedro Martins, the "Frigideira" was created with the arrival of the second group of prisoners, where the punishments increased more and more and had the objective of quickly eliminating the antifascists physically. Before they entered, they were completely stripped naked. He described the "Frigideira" as:

This jail is called the "frying pan". Both light and air enter through three holes drilled in the heavy iron door and through a small rectangle, open near the ceiling. During the day, the hot sun of the tropics heats the doors and walls of this small tomb. The air heats up inside. The heat becomes unbearable. The prisoners undress, but the heat doesn't stop torturing them. Sweat drips from their tired bodies. If they are many, drops of water condense on the ceiling, and when they fall, far from being a relief, they are torture. (...) At night, the mosquitoes come. From the bite of the mosquito comes fever, from fever comes death by bilious and pernicious. A small rectangular block made of concrete, six meters long by three meters wide and three meters high, divided in two to obtain two cells. The only door it had was shaped like a ship door with a dimension of 1.70 X 0.60 meters, with two rows of half-inch holes and a dividing gap of 50 centimeters long above the door. This space was strategically built away from any shady spots. The temperature ranged from 50 to 60 degrees such that the inmates' perspiration came off their bodies like bacon fat on a hot grill.

Here, prisoners ate only bread and water, every other day. Torture was thus exacerbated along with starvation. It was described as "an open road to death in a place isolated from everything and everyone". Here, between 1937 and 1944, 30 prisoners died, 45 fell ill with malaria, with 14 deaths, and 52 acquired lung diseases. Prisoners could be kept in the "Frigideira" for days, weeks, and even months. In total, 2824 days spent in the "Frigideira" are accounted for by the current Resistance Museum.

Due to strong pressure from the international community, as well as reformers within the regime, and with the defeat of the Axis powers in World War II, the "Frigideira" was demolished and buried in São Miguel. On top of its former construction site, a chapel was built after the overthrow of the Estado Novo in memory of those who passed through there. In the second phase, it is replaced by the "Holandinha".

=== Second phase ===
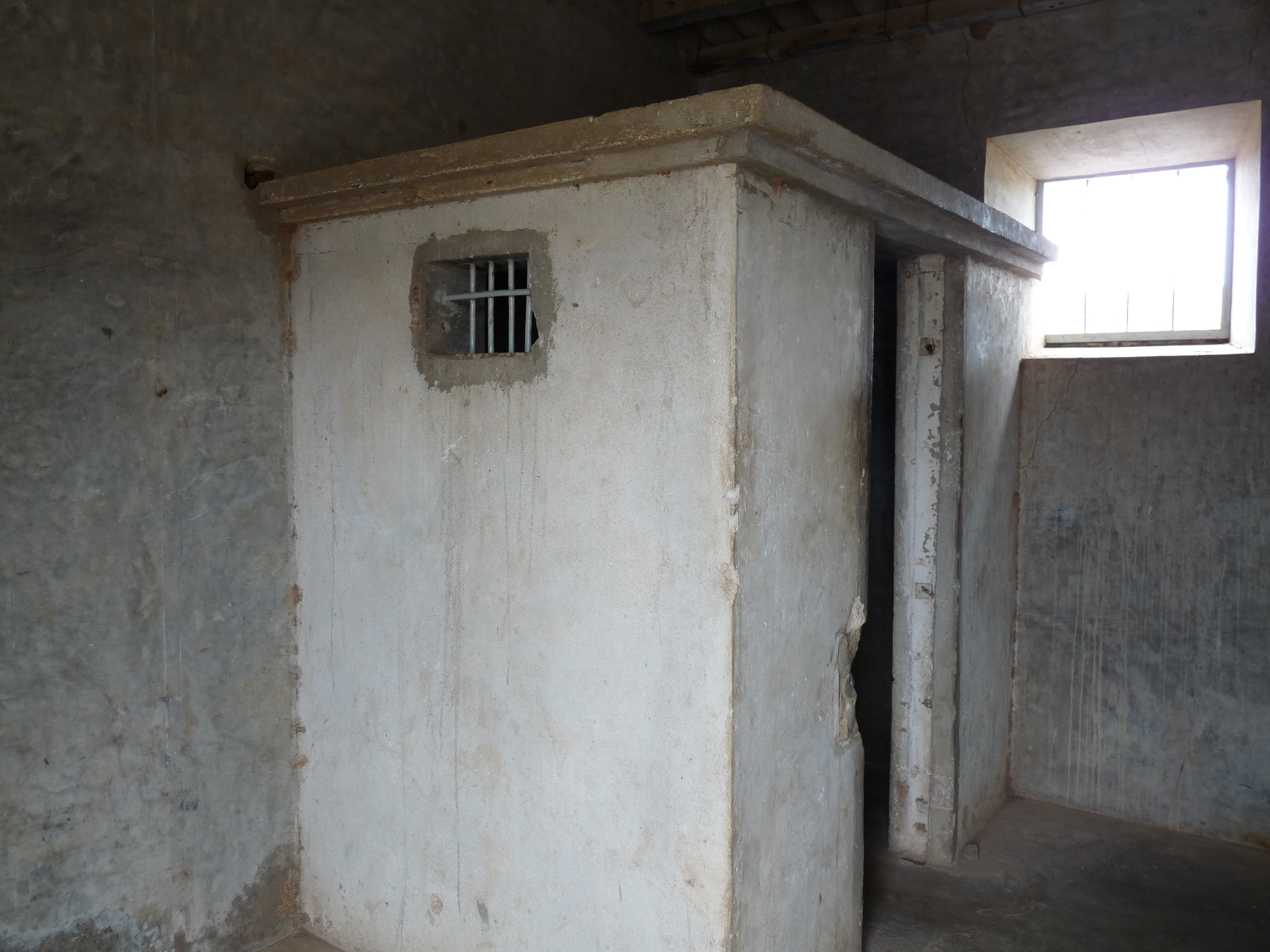
A hollandinha punishment cell. Temperatures inside could reach up to 45 °C during the day.

On 14 April 1961, the camp was reopened as a work camp by the Ministry of Overseas Territories, labeled "Chão Bom Work Camp". This phase coincided with the construction of the first stone pavilions and the reconfiguration of the protections to fortress-like protections. Its purpose was to imprison militants of the national liberation war from the Portuguese Colonial War in Angola, Guinea-Bissau and Cape Verde, isolating and torturing them. On 17 July 1961, it was expanded, in 1962 new buildings were constructed, and in 1967 a wall was built to increase security. According to Pedro Martins, then a Cape Verdean political prisoner, the Concentration Camp was "a place planned, designed, and built to make people suffer". According to him, the place where the Cape Verdeans were detained was so small that they were accommodated "like canned sardines". Regarding food, he says that "[c]achupa with a few traces of tuna was served to us daily," with minimal variation, and that when they refused to eat spoiled fish "that even dogs would not be able to eat", their meals were cut off. Luandino Vieira was one of the most prominent figures to be in Tarrafal during this phase, being imprisoned from 1964 to 1972. In 1965, the Portuguese Writers Society awarded him a prize, which resulted in the vandalization of its headquarters and its illegalization.

In total, about 230 African anti-colonialists were present in Tarrafal, including 106 Angolans, 100 Guineans, and 20 Cape Verdeans, with one Angolan and two Guineans dying from illness and mistreatment.

==== The "Holandinha" ====
The "Holandinha", as it was nicknamed by Cape Verdean prisoners, was the concrete structure that replaced the "Frigideira" of the first phase. It acquired the name "Holandinha" in reference to Holland, to where many Cape Verdeans departed. With a size of 1.76 x 1.05 x 1.79, it was intended to be "an authentic oven". It is described as "little taller than a man standing, little longer than a man lying down, little wider than a man sitting down, with a small barred window".

=== Closure ===
Following the Carnation Revolution of 25 April 1974 and the end of the dictatorship of the Estado Novo, the camp was definitively closed on 1 May 1974. Angolan Joel Pessoa refers to this event stating that "[the] Tarrafal was a prison for life. If it wasn't for the 25th of April we would all die there".

Between 1975 and 1985, it served as a recruitment center and military barracks but was abandoned after its closure. In 2009 it was transformed into the Museum of Resistance, and a project is currently underway that aims to apply for UNESCO's World Heritage List. It is the most visited museum in the country, with over 9,000 annual visits. The Resistance Museum is part of the preservation and musealization project of the former Concentration Camp of Tarrafal to give dignity to the site and the memories of the victims. The responsibility of its management and conservation was assigned to the Institute for Cultural Heritage Research (IIPC).

== Killed in Tarrafal ==
There were 37 political prisoners who died in Tarrafal, 34 Portuguese, one from Angola, and two from Guinea. The 34 Portuguese dead were only able to have their bodies returned to Portugal after the Carnation Revolution, and the closing of the camp on 1 May:

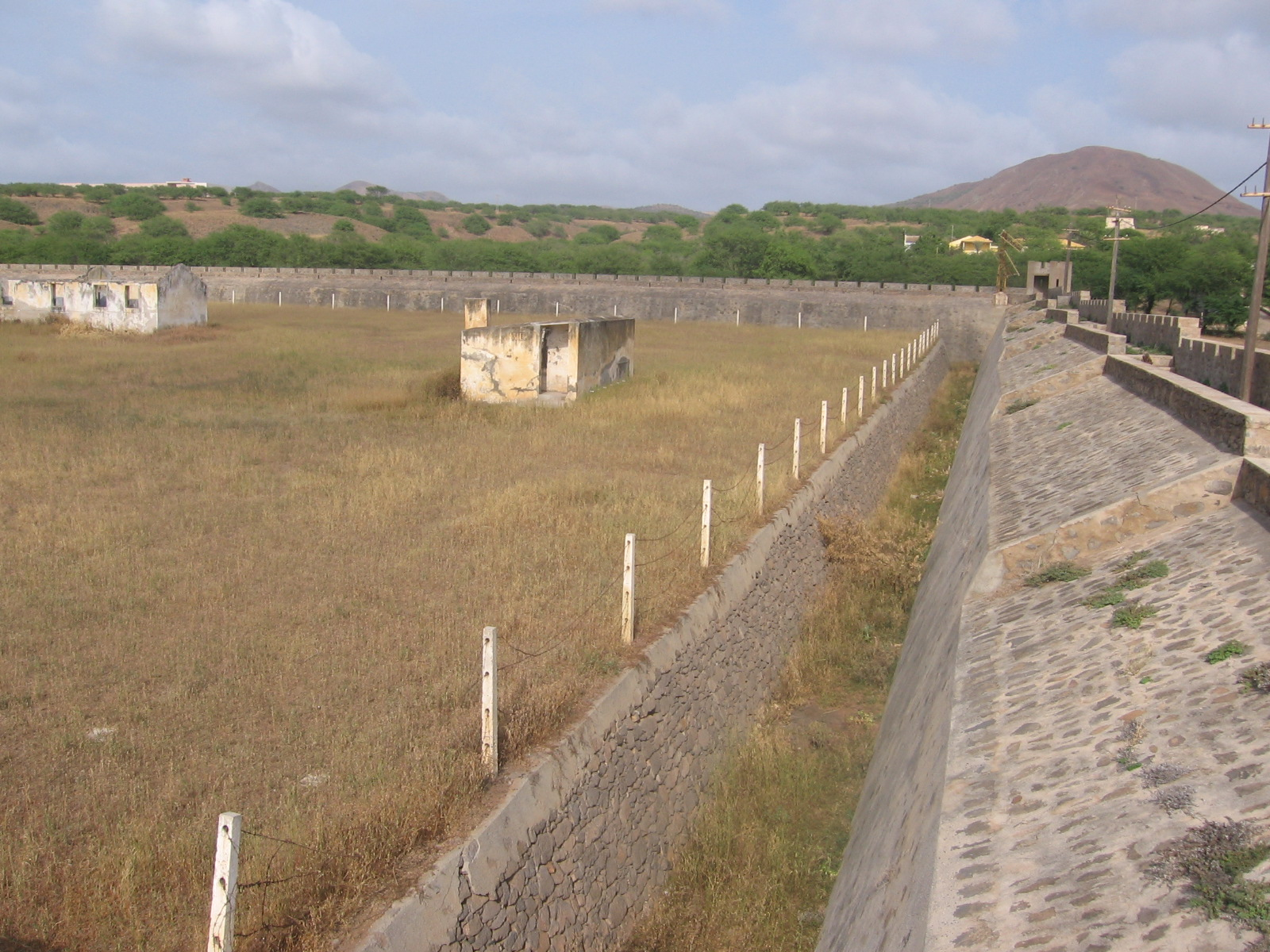
Perimeter walls around the camp.

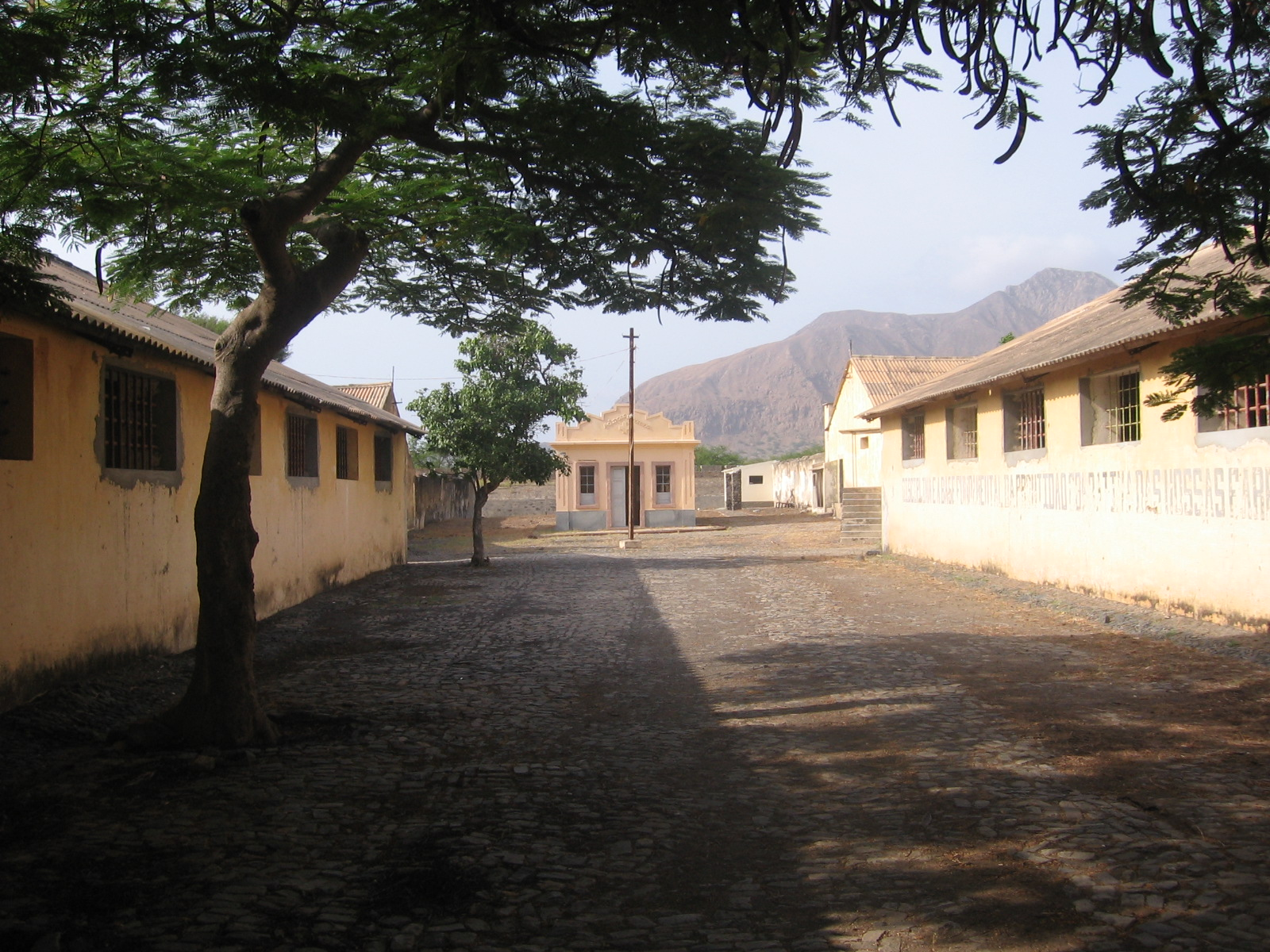
Barracks blocks within Tarrafal.

- Francisco José Pereira: Seaman, 28 (Lisbon, 1909 – Tarrafal 20 September 1937)
- Pedro de Matos Filipe: Docker, 32 (Almada, 19 June 1905 – Tarrafal, 20 September 1937)
- Francisco Domingues Quintas: Industrial worker, 48 (Grijó, Vila Nova de Gaia, April 1889 – Tarrafal, 22 September 1937)
- Rafael Tobias da Silva Pinto: Watchmaker, 26 (Lisbon, 1911 – Tarrafal 22 September 1937)
- Augusto Costa: Glassmaker (Leiria – Tarrafal, 22 September 1937?)
- Candido Alves Barja: Seaman, 27 (Castro Verde April 1910 – Tarrafal, 29 (24) September 1937?)
- Abilio Augusto Belchior: Marble worker, 40 years (1897 – Tarrafal, 29 October 1937?)
- Francisco do Nascimento Esteves: Mechanical turner, 24 (Lisbon, 1914 – Tarrafal, 21 (29) January 1938?)
- Arnaldo Simões Januário: Barber, 41 (Coimbra, 1897 – Tarrafal, 27 March 1938)
- Alfredo Caldeira: Painter decorator, 30 (Lisbon, 1908 – Tarrafal, 1 December 1938)
- Fernando Alcobia: Newsboy, 24 (Lisbon, 1915 – Tarrafal, 19 December 1939)
- Jaime da Fonseca e Sousa: Printer, 38 (Tondela, 1902 – Tarrafal, 7 July 1940)
- Albino António de Oliveira Coelho: Driver, 43 years (1897 – Tarrafal, 11 August 1940?)
- Mário dos Santos Castelhano: Office worker, 44 (Lisbon, May 1896 – Tarrafal, 12 October 1936)
- Jacinto Melo Faria Vilaça: Sailor, 26 years (May 1914 – Tarrafal, 3 January 1941?)
- Casimiro Júlio Ferreira: Tinker, 32 (Lisbon, 4 February 1909 – Tarrafal, 24 September 1941)
- Albino António de Carvalho de Oliveira: Shopkeeper, 57 (Povoa do Lanhoso, 1884 – Tarrafal, 22 (23) October 1941?)
- António Guedes de Oliveira e Silva: Driver, 40 (Vila Nova de Gaia, 1 May 1901 – Tarrafal, 3 November 1941)
- Ernesto José Ribeiro: Baker or hodman, 30 (Lisbon, March 1911 – Tarrafal, 8 December 1941)
- John Lopes Dinis: Construction, 37 (Sintra, 1904 – Tarrafal, 12 December 1941)
- Henrique Vale Domingues Fernandes: Sailor, 28 years (August 1913 – Tarrafal, 7 January (July) 1942?)
- Bento António Gonçalves: Mechanical Turner, 40 (Rio Fiães (Montalegre), 2 March 1902 – Tarrafal, 11 September 1942)
- Damásio Martins Pereira: Worker (? – Tarrafal, 11 November 1942?)
- António de Jesus Branco: Docker, 36 (Carregosa, 25 December 1906 – Tarrafal, 28 December 1942)
- Paulo José Dias: Maritime stoker, 39 (Lisbon, 24 January 1904 – Tarrafal, 13 January 1943)
- Joaquim Montes: Cork worker, 30 (Almada, 11 September 1912 – Tarrafal, 14 February 1943)
- Manuel Alves dos Reis (? – Tarrafal, 11 June 1943)
- Francisco Nascimento Gomes: Driver, 34 (Vila Nova de Foz Coa, 28 August 1909 – Tarrafal, 15 November 1943)
- Edmundo Gonçalves: 44 years (Lisbon, February 1900 – Tarrafal, 13 June 1944)
- Manuel Augusto da Costa: Mason (? – Tarrafal, 3 June 1945?)
- Joaquim Marreiros: Seaman, 38 (Lagos, 1910 – Tarrafal, 3 November 1948)
- António Guerra: Trade Employee, 35 (Marinha Grande, 23 June 1913 – Tarrafal, 28 December 1948)

=== Surviving prisoners ===
- Edmundo Pedro: future politician imprisoned in the 1930s and 1940s
- Pedro dos Santos Soares, a Communist Party member, was sent twice to Tarrafal, from 1936 to 1940 and from 1943 to 1946. He wrote a book about his experiences there, called Tarrafal: Campo da Morte Lenta, (Tarrafal: Camp of the Slow Death), which was published by the Communist Party clandestinely and anonymously in 1947.

== Legacy ==
In 2006, the World Monument Fund named Tarrafal one of its 100 watched monuments.

In 2009 an international symposium on the former Tarrafal concentration camp took place in Praia, Cape Verde, on the 35th anniversary of the camp's closing. The symposium was attended by former political prisoners and specialists from the countries of Cape Verde, Angola, Guinea Bissau and Portugal.
