= Catarina Eufémia =

Portuguese farmer and resistance symbol (1928–1954)

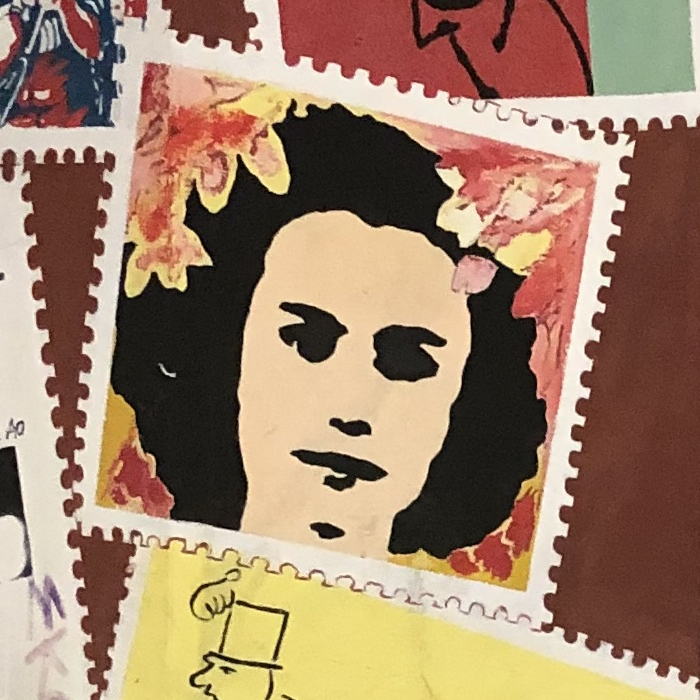

Catarina Efigénia Sabino Eufémia (Portuguese pronunciation: [kɐtɐˈɾinɐ ewˈfɛmiɐ]; February 13, 1928 – May 19, 1954) was an illiterate harvester from Alentejo, Portugal, who was murdered during a worker's strike by lieutenant Carrajola of the Guarda Nacional Republicana in Monte do Olival, Baleizão, in Beja, Alentejo. Catarina had three children, one eight months old, who was with her when she was shot.

The historic tragedy of Catarina came to personify the resistance movement against the regime of Salazar. She was adopted as an icon by the Portuguese Communist Party in Alentejo.

== Context ==
Alentejo was a region of large estates and seasonal jobs and the living conditions of the peasants and salaried workers were extremely difficult. This socio-economic and labor situation agitated the peasant masses in the region starting in the mid-1940s, and this social agitation escalated over the next two decades. There were constant uproars and rural workers' strikes, which were watched by the Portuguese police, who were looking for communist agitators and infiltrators.

== Death ==
=== Murder ===
On May 19, 1954, during the wheat harvest, Catarina and thirteen other harvest-women complained with the supervisor of the property where they were, trying to obtain a two escudo increase in their daily pay. The fourteen women frightened the supervisor enough for him to go to Beja to call the owner and the police.

Catarina was chosen to present the worker's grievances to the police. In response to a question of a police lieutenant, Catarina answered that they only wanted "work and bread". The lieutenant slapped her and she fell to the ground. When Catarina stood up, she said: "Now kill me already."

The lieutenant shot her three times, shattering her vertebrae. The eight-month-old boy she had in her arms was injured, along with another peasant. Catarina died a few minutes later in the hands of her own boss (who had arrived in the meantime.) He lifted her out of the pool of blood she lay in.

=== Funeral and burial ===
After the funeral, fearing the reaction of the populace, the authorities resolved to carry out Catarina's funeral secretly. When the commoners found out about the funeral, they ran towards the coffin with screams of protest. The police beat them back brutally. The coffin was hastily removed and taken not to the cemetery of Baleizão, but to the land of Catarina's husband António Joaquim, Quintos, about 10 km outside of Baleizão. In 1974, her remains were transferred to Baleizão.

In the sequence of disturbances during the funeral, nine peasants were accused of disrespecting authority; the majority of them were sentenced to two years in prison. Lieutenant Carrajola was transferred to Aljustrel but he never came to be judged in court. He died in 1964.

== Legend ==
=== Communist Party affiliations ===
While she has been made into an icon of the anti-fascist resistance, the Portuguese Communist Party supposedly adulterated details of the life and death of Catarina Eufémia. Firstly, they claim that Catarina was a militant of the Communist Party in the local committee of Baleizão in 1953, which some people claim to be false. The choice of Catarina as a spokeswoman for the harvest-women may actually have been influenced by there not being any suspicion of her being a communist. In fact, Mariana Janeiro, a militant communist imprisoned several times by the Polícia Internacional e de Defesa do Estado, always rejected the hypothesis that Catarina was a member of the party. On the other hand, António Gervásio, former leader of the PCP in Alentejo, affirms that Catarina was in fact a member of the local committee of the PCP of Baleizão in 1953.

=== Pregnancy ===
It has also been said that Catarina Eufémia was a few months pregnant when she was killed. Apparently, this information came from other harvest-women, whom Catarina had confided in a few days before her death. During the autopsy, the people of Baleizão were joined in the square of the Cathedral of Beja, a few meters from the Hospital da Misericórdia, crying out in despair: "It was not one, there were two deaths!" However, the forensic scientist who did the autopsy, Henriques Pinheiro, affirmed repeatedly, even after the revolution of 1974, that the references to a pregnancy were false.

=== In culture ===
Poets Sophia de Mello Breyner, Carlos Aboim Inglez, Eduardo Valente da Fonseca, Francisco Miguel Duarte, José Carlos Ary dos Santos, Maria Luísa Vilão Palma and António Vicente Campinas have all dedicated poems to her. António Vicente Campinas' "Cantar Alentejano" was put to music by Zeca Afonso on the album "Cantigas de Maio", made on Christmas 1971. (Hear part of the song here.)

The murder of Eufémia provides the inciting basis for Tiago Rodrigues' play Catarina and the Beauty of Killing Fascists, which toured Europe in 2026 before playing at the National Theatre, London, in September of that year.

== Bibliography ==
- Natália Santos, "Catarina Eufémia: (Des) Montagem de um Mito", Coimbra, 2005.
- Manuel de Melo Garrido, "A Morte de Catarina Eufémia. A Grande Dúvida de Um Grande Drama", Beja, ed. da Associação de Municípios do Distrito, 1974.
