= Armed Revolutionary Action =

Armed wing of the Portuguese Communist Party (PCP)

- Ação Revolucionária Armada
- Abbreviation: ARA
- Formation: 1964
- Purpose: End of repression: Civil rights; politics; expression; end of Colonial War; termination of Estado Novo
- Location: Portugal
- Affiliations: Portuguese Communist Party

The Armed Revolutionary Action (ARA) was the militant arm of the Portuguese Communist Party (PCP) active in metropole Portugal. It was a semi-autonomous organization that was active from 1970 to 1973 under the Estado Novo dictatorship then led by Marcelo Caetano. The first meeting of the Central Committee of the PCP on the use of violence as an action of self-defense took place in December 1962, and marked the Party's position on this issue, seeking to relate it to mass actions. Violence was not excluded and could be used in the paradigm of the "national uprising", as long as it was directed by the PCP, and in a context of radicalization and intensification of the mass struggle, which could lead to a revolutionary environment.

In 1964, the PCP decided to create the "special actions", and in 1965, the nucleus, composed of Raimundo Narciso and Rogério de Carvalho, went to Cuba to take a course on military training. Five months later, the "special actions" already had cadres, military equipment, and several clandestine locations. Their first target was the North Atlantic Treaty Organization (NATO) facilities near Rio de Mouro, but they were unsuccessful. That year, a wave of repression weakened the PCP and the ARA, which was unable to contact the PCP leadership for months. In 1966 a new group of militants were sent to Cuba for military training, but when they returned, influenced by the guerrilla line of foquismo, outside the party line, they broke with the PCP. In the meeting about the event, Álvaro Cunhal argued that future operatives of "special actions" should study in the Soviet Union instead of Cuba. In 1967, when Narciso returned from the Soviet Union, he was given the task of restructuring the "special actions" with Ângelo Veloso. In 1970, the "special actions" gathered approximately 42 operatives, being relatively stable and able to execute the actions already planned, and with a secure headquarters. In the context of radicalization of the Portuguese society, Raimundo Narciso starts directing the ARA with Jaime Serra and Francisco Miguel.

The "special actions" began to present themselves as Armed Revolutionary Action after the meeting held after the attack on the ship Cunene on October 26, 1970. On November 20, they detonated three bombs, each with a symbolic value, representing the fronts of political combat: the struggle against repression, colonial war, and imperialism. The International and State Defense Police (PIDE) – predecessor of the General Directorate of Security (DGS) – only discovered that the ARA was an organization linked to the PCP in the sabotage of the Tancos air base, with the code name, Operation "Águia Real" (Royal Eagle), due to the complexity involved and the size of the feat, which destroyed 28 aircraft, 13 of them irrecoverably. On June 3, 1971, there was a sabotage of the national and international telecommunication central during the NATO ministerial conference, which caused "great embarrassment" to the regime, and was reported worldwide. On October 2, the ARA carries out a mission to deflect explosive material in the assault on the quarry's gunroom. On October 27, two days before the inauguration of the Comiberlant Barracks, at 2 a.m., a bomb exploded, which caused giant destruction to the barracks, both inside and outside. In January 1972, the ARA carried out an action of destruction of sophisticated and new war material from France that was going to the colonial war on the ship Muxima, and in July there was an unsuccessful attempt to sabotage a ship. On August 9, on the day of Américo Tomás' inauguration, the ARA carried out one last action, which was to cut power throughout the country with sabotage actions.

After a year without action, and with conciliation between the opposition and the PCP, the ARA was suspended in May 1973. It had suffered heavy blows earlier, with the imprisonment of several important operatives. It remained clandestine until the Carnation Revolution and was only dissolved with the fall of the dictatorial Estado Novo regime.

== Political theory ==
=== Use of violence ===
In the meeting of the Central Committee of the Portuguese Communist Party held in December 1962, the question of using violence as a means of self-defense and its relation to mass actions was discussed for the first time. The position taken at this meeting was subsequently addressed and revisited in later meetings:

The possible organization of actions of a special type is a task to be carried out by special organizations which, although acting in conjunction with the actions and demonstrations of the masses and to stimulate them, must develop their action entirely independently of the action of the masses themselves. That is, the action of the organisms or groups for special actions can never be confused, even in the eyes of the repressive forces, with mass action and demonstrations.

For the PCP, the primary approach was peaceful mass actions aimed at achieving a "mass uprising," with armed struggle being a secondary and less emphasized aspect of their strategy, though it was still considered. The possibility of armed struggle was neither dismissed nor actively pursued; instead, it was viewed as a potential option to be used only when deemed appropriate. The April 1964 report Towards Victory endorsed the use of armed struggle but stressed that the main objective of the "Democratic and National Revolution" was to mobilize the masses to overthrow the regime and its repressive apparatus. The goal was to achieve the overthrow of the dictatorship through a "national mass uprising," although the conditions for such an uprising had not yet been met despite the growing popular opposition to the regime. According to the PCP, not being in a revolutionary situation meant that the masses were not yet prepared to undertake such action. For the PCP, its task was:

not only to push forward the popular struggle which itself aggravates the crisis of the regime, but to prepare to be able to lead the country into the decisive and final struggle in the coming revolutionary situation. [...] Guided by Marxism-Leninism, defining our orientation supported by the facts, we work to hasten the creation of a revolutionary situation and to create the political and organizational conditions to rise to the demands of the situation.

According to the PCP, if broad mass struggles lead to popular insurrection, the increasing confrontations between the repressive apparatus and the masses would necessitate that trained cadres transition to armed struggle. For the PCP, gaining the support of at least some segments of the military was crucial in this anti-fascist insurrection, as the military was a key pillar of the regime. Consequently, the PCP consistently sought to establish clandestine cells within various military divisions to focus on agitation, propaganda, mobilization, and organization among discontented military personnel. Within the leadership, there were differing opinions on the use of armed struggle. While some leaders favored mass struggles, others contended that armed actions were essential for overthrowing a repressive and violent regime.

=== Ideological issues ===
The PCP recognized the use of "special actions" as a means to deepen and intensify the political and social movement". Álvaro Cunhal defined "petty-bourgeois radicalism" as the "main ideological deviation that could affect the PCP:

Today, petty-bourgeois radicalism, verbal revolutionarism, insists on only one thing: immediate direct action, immediate violent action, immediate armed struggle. Some people talk like that and get sick when they hear about mass struggle and organization [...] This anarchist tendency is above all harmful because of the orientation it tries to give to the democratic struggle. It causes enormous harm in that it influences the democratic forces away from their essential, instantaneous, immediate tasks, without which they can never launch a victorious insurrection: the mass struggle and organization.

The most radical sectors included students and workers from the South Bank of the Tagus River. The PCP did not rule out violence but sought to use it within the framework of a "national uprising", provided it was directed by the PCP and occurred in a context of radicalization and intensified mass struggle, potentially leading to a revolutionary environment to overthrow the dictatorship. The PCP also aimed to combat "right-wing opportunism", "adventurism" and "leftism". After Álvaro Cunhal was released from prison, he strongly criticized the "right-wing policy" of Júlio Fogaça, and the possibility of armed insurrection was revisited. The PCP faced a complex situation, balancing Cunhal's criticisms, the Soviet Union's policy of peaceful coexistence, the most radical sectors of the workers' and students' movements, and attempts to reach agreements with other opposition groups. This impasse was resolved following the fraudulent elections in which General Humberto Delgado participated, which increased radicalization in Portuguese society. In 1964, the PCP began formulating a structure for non-lethal armed struggle against the colonial and repressive apparatus of the Estado Novo regime. This effort led to the creation of the Armed Revolutionary Action, a unique organization in the European context, as no other communist party had adopted armed struggle at that time. The ARA focused on targeting the colonial war—symbolizing imperialism, colonialism, repression, and loss of life—while also addressing the repressive state apparatus. The ARA committed to non-lethal actions, aiming to minimize the risk of loss of life, viewing lethal actions as counterproductive. Its struggle was designed to convey to the population that its primary target was the regime.

== Background ==
=== Formation of "special actions" ===
The PCP decided to begin the process of forming a new organization, focused on "special actions", stating that:

The worsening crisis of the fascist regime, the development of the political struggle of the masses, their radicalization, the brutality of the repressive apparatus, and the evolution of the colonial war, place a new task on the Party: the task of organizing actions of self-defense of the masses, actions aimed at hitting more directly the military apparatus of the colonial war, that create difficulties for the repressive apparatus, that hinder fascist propaganda and give new aspects to anti-fascist agitation and propaganda. The execution of such actions cannot be left to spontaneity. It must be faced on the practical ground.

Rogério de Carvalho, a member of the Central Committee since 1963, was tasked with establishing the "special actions" organization, which began recruiting its original core in 1964. Raimundo Narciso, a student at the Instituto Superior Técnico (IST) in Lisbon, who had been involved in several political activities, was contacted and went underground. A militia officer was also approached but refused to participate. Almeida, who collaborated with the PCP from 1965 to 1966, also declined to go underground due to his academic commitments but agreed to remain a party militant and carry out the tasks assigned to him. Consequently, the "special actions" group initially consisted of only two members and the support of Almeida.

In early 1965, Rogério de Carvalho and Raimundo Narciso traveled through the Soviet Union before proceeding to Cuba for military training. Both had previously served as militia officers in the Portuguese Army at different times. In the Soviet Union, they met with Álvaro Cunhal and Francisco Miguel Duarte, receiving direct instructions from Cunhal, who defined the objectives of the organization. According to Raimundo Narciso, "the PCP intended to create a parallel structure, politically tutored and supported, which allowed the PCP to disengage from direct responsibility for the actions to be carried out." They spent two months in Cuba receiving training in weapon handling, explosives, and guerrilla techniques at a mansion in El Vedado, Havana.

Upon their return to Portugal, Rogério de Carvalho and Raimundo Narciso sought to establish a support network. They made contact with António Pedro Ferreira (pseudonym "Morais"), a student at the Instituto Superior Técnico; Leonel (pseudonym), an engineer and veteran of the colonial war; and Mário Reis, a worker.

=== Suppliers ===
Paratrooper Lieutenant Cassiano Bessa, a PCP-linked officer and the main supplier of diverted materials from the barracks was denounced but managed to flee the country before his arrest. His escape was considered an "important loss" for the "special actions" group. Most of the equipment used by the "special actions" and later by the Armed Revolutionary Action, including weaponry and explosives, came from the Portuguese Army. This equipment was either diverted by militants, sympathizers, or military personnel opposed to the war. In 1967, work within the Armed Forces intensified both in Portugal and the colonies. The bulletin IRFA – Revolutionary Information for the Armed Forces began publication. This PCP organization within the Armed Forces continued until the April 25, 1974, revolution. According to Carlos Brito, "this party structure proved to be of great importance, as it allowed the PCP to closely monitor the movement of the captains, later known as the MFA (Armed Forces Movement), from its inception and throughout its evolution".

Leonel (pseudonym), while fighting in Mozambique, embezzled military material, which he transported to Portugal in a bag. He undertook this risk independently, without any directive from the PCP, driven by his belief that the materials would be useful in the fight against the regime. Upon learning of this, the PCP connected him with the "special actions" organization. According to Raimundo Narciso, "[the] war in Africa was a true school of training in the armed struggle against fascism and the colonial war. It provided technical training but, more importantly, political and psychological preparation. The Colonial War helped many young people mature for the armed struggle against Marcelism". In 1966, Leonel received political and military training in the Soviet Union and severed contact with Raimundo. Nevertheless, Raimundo had one final encounter with Leonel when the ARA sabotaged telecommunications during a North Atlantic Treaty Organization (NATO) meeting in Lisbon. Remarkably, Leonel was sent by his company to repair the damage caused by the explosives.

Mayer (pseudonym), the caretaker for a family with ties to the Estado Novo, served as the organization's supplier of chemicals necessary for making explosives. This included controlled substances such as concentrated sulfuric acid.

=== Attack attempt ===
After five months of recruitment involving Rogério de Carvalho, Raimundo Narciso, and the Portuguese Communist Party, the "special actions" group had assembled a team ready to commence operations. They also secured facilities for storing equipment, including a villa with a gunroom function in Mafra, a rented garage, and three storage rooms in Lisbon. Additionally, they acquired weapons and high-powered explosives from military personnel with connections to the PCP and identified several potential targets.

The first target was the North Atlantic Treaty Organization (NATO) facilities near Rio de Mouro. The goal was to make a significant impact and force the regime to acknowledge opposition to both itself and the colonial war. Antunes (pseudonym), a metallurgical worker from a war material factory, was tasked with placing the bomb near NATO's facilities. Narciso waited a few hundred meters away in a getaway car, but Antunes never returned. He vanished without a trace, causing the initial plan to fail.

=== Arrests of 1965 ===
In October 1965, a wave of arrests by the International and State Defense Police (PIDE) caused alarm among operatives, leading to the detention of several Portuguese Communist Party militants, some militia officers, and two key members of the Armed Revolutionary Action, Rogério de Carvalho and Álvaro Veiga de Oliveira. During this crackdown, the garage, two storage rooms, and some weapons were confiscated. However, the villa in Mafra and the material stored there remained secure because only Rogério knew its location, and Narciso was confident that Rogério would not disclose it to the police.

After the wave of repression, several measures were implemented to safeguard the organization and its operatives, who were now only connected to the Portuguese Communist Party through Rogério, who was in prison. According to Raimundo Narciso, attempts to contact the PCP in Lisbon were conducted "with the utmost care to avoid approaching anyone being monitored by the PIDE and to ensure that our cautiousness was not mistaken for a trap by the political police". However, reestablishing contact with the PCP leadership proved difficult, leading to the suspension of "special actions" until a connection with the leadership could be reestablished. This left the group isolated with only a few operatives. Despite this, recruits allowed the organization to continue its activities and cover expenses. In August 1966, contact with the PCP leadership was re-established through Ângelo Veloso, who became the intermediary between the PCP and the "special actions".

Due to the weakening of the PCP apparatus after the wave of repression, particularly in Lisbon, Rogério was informed by Ângelo Veloso that the PCP had decided to send him to the Soviet Union for political training. During this period, the "special actions" had to be suspended due to concerns about how much the International and State Defense Police (PIDE) knew about their activities. Additionally, a group of militants was sent to Cuba for military training, with the intention of integrating them into the "special actions" upon their return.

=== Contact with the foquismo ===
The group of four militants sent to Cuba eventually broke with the Portuguese Communist Party and established their guerrilla organization, the Armed Liberation Forces (FAL). This group remained active until 1969 when one of its commanders was arrested. Earlier, after completing their training, they met in Prague with Álvaro Cunhal, Manuel Rodrigues da Silva (both members of the Secretariat), and Carlos Brito. According to Carlos Brito, "It was a difficult meeting. The comrades were on a different wavelength. Influenced by the Cuban approach, they focused solely on 'special actions' and were primarily concerned with combating the colonial war apparatus". During the meeting, Cunhal attempted to convince the group that the "guerrilla focus" (foquismo) strategy was unsuitable for Portugal and that the PCP's strategy was more viable. Despite their initial willingness to adhere to the PCP, Cunhal concluded that engaging with comrades who were so committed to a divergent approach posed a "very serious risk." He was concerned that the group would continue to pursue foquismo in Portugal. In a subsequent Secretariat meeting, Cunhal recommended that future operatives of the Armed Revolutionary Action receive their military training in the Soviet Union. Despite the leadership's attempts to reach an agreement, the group only agreed to discreetly withdraw from the PCP.

=== Restructuring of "special actions" ===
When Narciso returned from Moscow in June 1967, he found the organization disorganized, weak, and disarticulated. He and Ângelo Veloso were tasked with restructuring the "special actions" group. They rented two storage rooms in Lisbon, a garage in Amadora, and a villa near Sintra for storing war materials and other equipment. In 1968, they purchased a farmhouse northeast of Torres Vedras to serve as a central gunroom, which remained operational until the Carnation Revolution on April 25, 1974. To protect the location from police scrutiny, a couple of clandestine PCP employees were appointed as caretakers. They posed as housekeepers for a landlord who visited only occasionally, which helped to avoid suspicion. Additionally, a group of militants, including three members of the PCP, was sent to Moscow for military training to integrate them into the "special actions. This group included Francisco Miguel Duarte, an individual known only by the pseudonym Almendra, and a third person described as a worker according to Almendra. At the time, Almendra was a student and a member of the Central Committee of the PCP, exiled in Paris. During their training in Moscow, they learned various skills, including ship sabotage, weapons handling, making and using bombs, grenades, Molotov cocktails, and military strategy. Almendra noted that the training required great preparation as well as physical and psychological resilience.

At the same time, reorganization efforts continued in Portugal. The PCP's strategy was for its militants to fulfill compulsory military service, thereby increasing political work within the Armed Forces, both in the barracks and in the colonies. With a growing supply of material, Narciso and Ângelo Veloso's most pressing concern was the shortage of operatives capable of armed action. When Francisco Miguel returned, he took over as the liaison between the "special actions" and the PCP Central Committee, replacing Ângelo Veloso.

=== Constitution of the ARA ===
In 1968, Francisco Miguel and Almendra, whose pseudonym and the fact that he arrived married to a French woman are the only known details, arrived in Portugal to join what would later become the Armed Revolutionary Action. From 1968 to 1970, the "special actions" group grew to about 42 operatives, maintaining relative stability and securing their gunroom. During this period, their activities focused on logistics and reconnaissance. In July 1970, Jaime Serra, a member of the PCP Central Committee, was appointed to lead the ARA, with Joaquim Gomes serving as the link between the PCP and the ARA. The Central Command was responsible for selecting targets, preparing and executing missions, and supervising the organization's operatives. Although the ARA operated as an autonomous structure within the PCP, it answered directly to the executive committee, which provided funding, material, and operatives. The ARA was a semi-autonomous organization with challenges in recruiting operatives, as the PCP maintained a high level of secrecy and only a few leaders were aware of its existence. Raimundo says about the recruitment of cadres and operatives:

They couldn't put in recent cadres or people who didn't give guarantees. These cadres generally didn't come, and the Party tended to send cadres they didn't want in other organizations. Generally, they didn't send the good cadres that were needed in other organizations. They sent people who had a propensity for special actions and who were sent here so that they could be framed and not cause problems in other organizations. The people who came to the ARA had to agree with the armed actions.

The ARA also engaged in recruiting individuals close to the leaders based on trust. The organization employed strict compartmentalization; each cell operated independently and had no knowledge of the others, even among the leaders themselves. According to Ana Ferreira in her PhD thesis on Contemporary History, "the ARA was a highly disciplined organization, and its members were fully aware of the risks associated with their involvement and participation in armed actions". The ARA adhered to the PCP's directives but also made independent decisions regarding armed actions, navigating through intense political repression and internal disagreements within the PCP about the use of armed struggle. In May 1970, the PCP Central Committee revisited the topic of armed struggle, leading to the decision to initiate armed actions. Jaime Serra, Raimundo Narciso, and Francisco Miguel were appointed as leaders for these actions. During this period, society experienced increasing radicalization, particularly among youth and students. Several groups emerged, advocating for armed struggle, including the Liga de Unidade e Ação Revolucionária, the Portuguese National Liberation Front, the Portuguese Revolutionary Joint, and the Brigadas Revolucionárias. Despite these developments, the ARA did not commence its armed struggle until 1970 due to the need for rigorous preparation, ongoing political repression, and internal disagreements about the use of violence.

== Operations ==
=== Attack on Cunene ===
The first armed action began to be planned and recognized in August 1970. By September, the target was defined and the plan was formulated, but due to the constraints of clandestinity, Gabriel Pedro could not reach Portugal in time. In October, the liner Vera Cruz and the "most modern cargo ship of the African lines", the Cunene, arrived in Portugal. Gabriel Pedro, along with Carlos Coutinho, was scheduled to board the Vera Cruz. Coutinho was responsible for installing the explosive charges on the ship. The planning involved detailed reconnaissance of the Algés dock and its surroundings, including the routes and timings of meetings, with strict adherence to compartmentalization and non-overlapping interactions among team members. Gabriel Pedro, after further review, proposed amendments that led to a complete reformulation of the procedures. He had the central role in the operation: acquiring a rowboat and transporting Carlos Coutinho to the Vera Cruz. Gabriel Pedro, a 72-year-old veteran communist militant, had previously spent several years imprisoned in the Tarrafal concentration camp. The operation team included Raimundo Narciso, Francisco Miguel, Carlos Coutinho, Gabriel Pedro, António João Eusébio, Manuel Policarpo Guerreiro, and Victor d'Almeida d'Eça. Just before the operation, the explosive charges assembled by Narciso and Miguel in the ARA laboratory in Arruda dos Vinhos were moved to a secure location in Alcântara, with the clocks synchronized for 5 a.m.

The Secretary-General had in that meeting a great ally, the legendary Gabriel Pedro, very dear to the organization, who by then already knew that he would come to Portugal to participate in an ARA attack and therefore could assure with full conviction that the Party did not reject and was even preparing to carry out armed actions. Gabriel Pedro was then already very weak. During the three days that the Assembly lasted he had to leave from time to time to rest. When he was absent, Cunhal took advantage of the intervals to visit him. In one of them, he invited me to accompany him. I hardly knew Gabriel Pedro and on seeing him prostrate I was appalled. I knew, due to my responsibilities in the interior, that he was the one who was going to enter the country to take part in a certain task of great risk. So I asked: "But do you think, Álvaro, that he is in a physical condition to go to the interior to take part in such a task? It is a task to be carried out on the Tagus, and he says that no one knows the Tagus like he does. It is the prospect of this task that gives him life".

— Carlos Brito on Gabriel Pedro, 2010

==== Start of operation ====
On October 26, 1970, at 9:45 p.m., the operation began. After several meetings among the operatives, Carlos Coutinho and Gabriel Pedro rowed out from the Poço do Bispo dock in Marvila. Disguised as fishermen, they had a low risk of detection. They successfully reached the Vera Cruz liner without incident, narrowly avoiding a collision with a cargo ship, which Gabriel Pedro skillfully maneuvered around. However, upon reaching the liner, they encountered an unexpected maritime police patrol, which made it impossible for Gabriel Pedro to proceed without detection. With the bombs' timers set for 5 a.m., they had to make a swift decision and opted to plant them on the Cunene instead. Placing the bombs proved challenging; they had to be secured in a clean underwater area. Carlos Coutinho used a steel brush to ensure the magnets adhered properly, despite the risk of slipping into the river. After considerable effort, he successfully placed the bombs. Following the mission, Gabriel Pedro emigrated to Paris, where he died two years later, in February 1972.

==== Result ====
The following day, news of an explosion on the Cunene appeared in the newspapers. O Século published a photograph of the ship showing visible damage. Meanwhile, Diário de Notícias reported an interview with several individuals, including the ship's commander, who suggested that "the rupture was likely caused by a leakage of diesel or gases in the hold".

On the same day, a meeting of the ARA Central Command took place. Jaime Serra presented a statement to Reuters, France Press, and United Press. During this meeting, the decision was made to establish a name for the group to claim responsibility for the action. Following a suggestion by Raimundo Narciso, the name "Armed Revolutionary Action" was chosen.

As a result of this action the ship CUNENE [capital letters in the original], of 16,000 tons used to feed the colonial war, was flooded and immobilized in the Alcântara dock, in Lisbon, with a big hole. The Central Command of the ARMED REVOLUTIONARY ACTION [capital letters in the original] declares that by attacking the war machine that feeds the colonial war we are not against the honorable soldiers, sergeants, and officers forced to wage a war they hate. Rather, we are against the continuation of this criminal war of colonial oppression that has become a scourge for the peoples of Angola, Guinea, and Mozambique and a cancer that corrodes the nation, that burns the life and property of the Portuguese people to serve the interests of a handful of stateless monopolists. We stand in solidarity with the just liberating struggle of the colonial peoples

— ARA Announcement, October 26, 1970.

In the same announcement, the line defended by the Portuguese Communist Party was emphasized again, and that this action was part of the mass struggle.

=== The "Triple Action" ===
==== Preparation ====
In the meetings following the Cunene action, new targets were proposed, including the PIDE/DGS headquarters. However, this idea was discarded due to the difficulty of accessing the location and the risk of causing casualties. Instead, the PIDE Technical School, located near Benfica Road, was suggested as a target. This choice was seen as a viable way to strike at the regime and its repressive apparatus. Additionally, several other targets were proposed. To symbolize opposition to American imperialism, the Cultural Center of the United States on Duque de Loulé Avenue was selected. Finally, a military target was chosen: the Niassa, a ship preparing to leave Portugal with war equipment. During the meeting, the teams were organized, and plans were made regarding the methods and materials for these actions.

Each of these planned actions carried symbolic significance, representing different fronts of political struggle: repression, the colonial war, and imperialism.

==== PIDE's Technical School ====
Superficially, the operation targeting the PIDE/DGS Technical School seemed the easiest to execute. The plan involved placing an explosive device on the street near the Technical School, a location with minimal foot traffic at night. The risk of an unintended casualty seemed low, as it was unlikely a passerby would be present at the exact moment of the explosion or tamper with the device's container. To minimize risk further, the bomb was planted at 3:40 a.m., just twenty minutes before the scheduled detonation. However, the operation turned tragic when a 15-year-old boy, who had returned from work, encountered the device. It is unclear whether he attempted to move or open the box or was simply in the vicinity when the explosion occurred. This incident marked the only ARA action with a fatal outcome.

The press reported the fatality alongside the explosions, and the PIDE/DGS attributed it to an ARA operative. The ARA viewed the fatality as a victim of repression and fascism and considered the placement of the explosive device outside the building a significant error. Consequently, the organization resolved never to conduct operations with targets near public roads again.

==== Foundry Wharf ====
The ship Niassa was selected as a target due to its station at the Foundry Wharf in Lisbon and its cargo of ordnance for the colonial war. The ARA Central Committee became aware of the ship through António Pedro Ferreira, a PCP militant employed at the Army's Transport Service Directorate. The operation involved sending a booby-trapped parcel to a soldier, which would be placed in the ship's hold. The parcel contained a large explosive device, an incendiary charge, and two synchronized timers set to detonate 18 hours after shipment, with the second timer as a backup in case the first failed. To prevent tampering, the box was reinforced with steel straps, a common practice for items sent to soldiers.

The bomb, intended for the Niassa, did not explode on the ship but rather at the Wharf warehouse due to unforeseen delays in shipment caused by bureaucratic issues. The device detonated at six in the morning, startling the residents.

==== United States Cultural Center ====
The plan for the action at the American Cultural Center involved placing an explosive device inside the building, with the clock set to detonate at dawn. The bomb was concealed within a thick, spine-bound book to avoid detection. Romeo (pseudonym), a militia furir serving his mandatory military service in the Commandos, was assigned the task of executing this mission.

The operation at the American Cultural Center began weeks in advance. Romeo visited the center to examine and plan his approach. He purchased a similar book in English from a bookstore to match the ones he had observed. After the book was opened and filled with a pound of plastic explosive by ARA operatives, it was placed inside a shirt box to resemble a gift. On the day of the operation, at 6:30 p.m., Romeo entered the Cultural Center with the shirt box and asked to browse the books. After the visitors had left, he proceeded to the shelf he had previously examined and replaced one of the books with the bomb-laden book, putting the center's book in the shirt box. He left the premises at 7:00 p.m. The device detonated at 4:30 a.m., injuring the two PSP guards and two other individuals with shattered window panes, but none sustained serious injuries.

The PIDE/DGS never uncovered the precise details of the operation, concluding that the operatives must have entered through the back door.

==== The result of the three actions ====
On November 20, 1970, the coordinated bombings were carried out. The press widely covered the events, featuring interviews with the head of the PIDE/DGS. At that time, the PIDE/DGS was unaware of the connection between the Armed Revolutionary Action and the Portuguese Communist Party. Instead, they suspected the attacks were the work of a Maoist group.

=== Operation "Águia Real" (Royal Eagle) ===
==== Preparation ====
In the early morning of March 8, 1971, one of the ARA's most significant actions occurred: the sabotage of the Tancos air base, which led to the destruction of numerous military airplanes and helicopters. The planning for this operation began in August 1970, when Raimundo Narciso was introduced to Ângelo de Sousa, a young Air Force corporal undergoing mandatory military service at Air Base No. 3 in Tancos, through Jaime Serra. Following this introduction, discussions ensued about a potential operation at the base. Fifteen days later, Ângelo de Sousa proposed a sabotage mission involving the explosion of several military aircraft. This plan involved placing explosive devices at dawn, which would be executed by an ARA commando team.

Ângelo de Sousa managed to obtain keys to the air base from a corporal who had access to them for gasoline refueling. These keys were borrowed from various ranks, including sergeants and officers, and given to Jaime Serra to produce a copy. Although the scheme was discovered, leading to an inquiry and a temporary delay in the operation, the investigation was eventually shelved. This allowed the illicit supply of keys to continue, facilitating the planning of the sabotage. The plan involved ARA operatives disguising themselves as military personnel and being introduced to the base's guard as members from Ota Air Base. Once inside the complex, they intended to place bombs equipped with incendiary charges and electrical circuits on each aircraft, which would be detonated simultaneously. The operatives responsible for executing the action included Ângelo de Sousa, Carlos Coutinho, and António João Eusébio, who would be transported to the base by a hired car. Raimundo Narciso was in charge of coordinating the operation. Following the mission, Ângelo de Sousa was to stay in a safe apartment until arrangements could be made to get him abroad. A comprehensive technical simulation of the operation was conducted at the farm in Arruda dos Vinhos, as detailed by Raimundo Narciso.

==== Action ====
In the early morning hours of March 7, 1971, the commandos involved in the action convened at a clandestine ARA apartment on Estados Unidos da América Avenue to verify the electrical systems and ensure all preparations were in order. Upon arriving at Tancos, they gained access to the base smoothly, bypassing any searches or formalities as planned. Using the copied keys, they entered the hangar and proceeded to install the electrical and explosive systems according to their pre-acquired data. The final, critical step was connecting the charges to the batteries. Any mistake at this stage could trigger an immediate and catastrophic explosion. After successfully setting up the system, Carlos Coutinho left the site, setting a trap by the door. This trap was designed to activate the entire explosive setup if someone attempted to open the door. The team managed to exit the base without arousing suspicion.

==== Result ====
At 3:45 a.m., the explosive devices were triggered, resulting in a massive fire. The explosion caused irreparable damage, destroying five helicopters and eight aircraft, while fifteen additional aircraft sustained varying degrees of damage. The hangar was also heavily impacted. The Secretary of State for Aeronautics received a confidential report detailing the explosive system used and the extent of the damage caused. In response, the ARA issued a press release taking responsibility for the attack. The statement highlighted the complexity and success of the operation, commending the bravery of the operatives involved. It also noted that "the increasingly predominant anti-colonialist sentiment among Portuguese soldiers, sons of the people in uniform, contributed decisively to its success", concluding with the rallying cry: "Down with the colonial war! Long live the armed popular insurrection!"

Photographs of Ângelo de Sousa were widely published in the press, accompanied by notes detailing several accusations against him. Following this high-profile operation, the PIDE/DGS began to connect the ARA to the PCP. The scale and sophistication of the sabotage were such that it suggested a well-organized and capable logistical and technical support structure. From the police's perspective, "only the PCP would possess the structures, operational capability, and resources necessary to execute such a complex operation successfully".

The Central Committee of the PCP hailed the formation of the ARA as "an important political event in national political life." They emphasized the "political justness" of the ARA's struggle against colonialism, fascism, and imperialism. The Committee assessed that the ARA's actions had generated "a wave of enthusiasm and increased confidence in the popular struggle toward armed insurrection".

The defense of your organization; the just evaluation of the political conjuncture and of the effect of each action to be undertaken; the effort to be efficient, always taking into account the actual strength at one's disposal and the enemy's strength and devices; initiative and audacity, not to be confused in any way with impatience and rashness; the effort to make the most of surprise and to best pick off the enemy where he may be unprepared; careful work to achieve the objectives without leaving a trace, nor a clue – such seem to us to be some of the essential norms for the continuity and progress of your action.

— Personal greetings from the Secretary General of the Portuguese Communist Party, Álvaro Cunhal.

Álvaro Cunhal also emphasized that the revolutionary movement in Portugal had limited experience with this type of struggle. He stressed that each action undertaken should be carefully analyzed to enhance and refine future operations.

=== Action against NATO meeting ===
On June 3, 1971, several ministers from NATO member countries gathered in Lisbon, accompanied by hundreds of international journalists covering the high-profile meeting, which was enthusiastically promoted by Marcello Caetano. This meeting, the first of its kind in many years, provided an ideal opportunity for the ARA to draw international attention to the colonial war and the opposition struggle in Portugal. Jaime Serra's brother, Alberto Serra, a technician at the telephone and telecommunications central office in Lisbon, had extensive knowledge of the communications system, including the crucial wires and underground cables connecting Portugal to the outside world.[51] Coordinated by Raimundo Narciso, the team for this action included Carlos Coutinho, António Eusébio, and Alberto Serra.

On June 3, 1971, three operatives disguised as company workers entered the Central Telecommunications Office, carrying two explosive charges set to detonate at 3:30 a.m. The explosion severed Lisbon's connections to the outside world, resulting in a complete communications blackout that lasted for six hours. This act of sabotage against the national and international telecommunications center during the NATO ministerial conference created significant embarrassment for the regime and was widely reported globally, including by French newspaper Le Figaro, the English The Guardian, and on BBC and West German radio. In addition to the telecommunications attack, the ARA planned to cut the electricity in Lisbon to prevent the broadcast of Marcello Caetano's speech. Three separate cells were organized for this operation: one led by Raimundo Narciso and Ramiro Morgado, another with Carlos Coutinho and António Eusébio working alongside the first cell, and a third comprising Francisco Miguel, Manuel dos Santos Guerreiro, and Manuel Policarpo Guerreiro, who were tasked with operations in Belas. However, the electricity disruption did not proceed as planned due to insufficient explosive charges. Despite this, the operation succeeded in damaging several poles, leading to power outages in certain areas of Lisbon, including the Palace of Ajuda, where the NATO meeting was taking place.

In their statement, the ARA justified their actions as a protest against the NATO Ministerial Council meeting, which they characterized as a "warmongering and imperialist manifestation." They condemned the meeting for providing "moral and political support to the fascist and colonialist government" of Portugal, viewing it as a provocation against the Portuguese people, who had long been deprived of basic democratic freedoms supposedly championed by NATO. The ARA claimed that their operations caused "the greatest confusion and disorientation in the logistical arrangements for the NATO meeting, as well as among the fascist authorities", highlighting that the "services of the meeting were seriously affected".

=== Assault on the quarry's armory ===
On October 2, 1971, the ARA executed a unique operation targeting a quarry in Loures to steal explosive material. This was the only action of its kind undertaken by the ARA, driven by the limited stock of explosives they had and heightened security at military barracks due to the increased frequency of attacks against the regime that year. The operation was initiated after the Central Command learned of a significant cache of explosive material stored in an armory at the Loures quarry. Reconnaissance missions were conducted by Francisco Miguel, Raimundo Narciso (accompanied by his wife and daughter), António Pedro Ferreira, and Ramiro Morgado.

That night, the commando moved from Lisbon toward the armory. Manuel dos Santos Guerreiro and Raimundo Narciso traveled in a car, while Manuel Policarpo Guerreiro and Amado Ventura da Silva preceded them by fifteen minutes on the latter's motorcycle. Jorge Trigo de Sousa, driving alone, kept a significant distance from the others to avoid detection. His role was to provide armed surveillance at one end of the quarry, monitoring the guardhouse and the access road to prevent any intervention. After cutting through the barbed wire and breaking down the armory door, the team successfully stole 498 kg of dynamite, along with a large quantity of detonators and incendiary cord. They left the site at 4 a.m.

This action remained unknown to the police until 1973.

=== Attack on Comiberlant ===
The inauguration of the new NATO Headquarters in Oeiras was scheduled for October 29, 1971. The NATO Command for the Ibero-Atlantic region (Comiberlant) was designed to serve as a central communications hub for all other NATO headquarters. The ARA viewed these facilities as a provocation and as evidence of NATO's support for the Portuguese dictatorship and its colonial wars. Therefore, attacking the headquarters would have significant symbolic value. To carry out the operation, the ARA needed to smuggle explosives past the guardhouse. Raimundo Narciso and Victor Eça conducted a reconnaissance of the site. Manuel dos Santos Guerreiro and Manuel Policarpo Guerreiro were selected to execute the plan, which was to be carried out in the early morning hours when there was a higher likelihood that the guards would be asleep. One of the ARA commanders, who lived near the target and was familiar with several of its employees, provided crucial inside information about the building, contributing to the operation's success, according to Jaime Serra. The selection of operatives was a matter of intense debate between Raimundo Narciso and Francisco Miguel, as Carlos Coutinho, Ângelo de Sousa, Eusébio, and Jaime Serra—some of the ARA's most experienced members—were in Moscow undergoing technical-military training.

During the night, Raimundo Narciso was transported by Jorge Trigo de Sousa to the storeroom Campo de Ourique. After retrieving the bomb, which was concealed in a wooden box decorated to resemble a birthday present, they proceeded to Oeiras, where Manuel Guerreiro was stationed. Manuel Policarpo Guerreiro received the bomb and was responsible for placing it in the building. Raimundo Narciso, Manuel Policarpo Guerreiro, and Manuel Guerreiro entered the premises by opening the gate. They first approached the guardhouse, where Narciso took cover, and then moved on to the main building to position the bomb. At 2 a.m., the bomb detonated, causing massive damage to the Comiberlant Barracks. The explosion resulted in the collapse of part of the facade and wall, as well as the destruction of windows, doors, nearly all furniture, and electronic devices.

According to Raimundo Narciso, the censorship prevented any news about the explosion from appearing in the newspapers. Since the action occurred just two days before the scheduled commemoration, there was a concerted effort to repair the building's facade to conceal the damage. However, the extent of the destruction rendered the attempt ineffective. Consequently, the inauguration ceremony had to be relocated to the street and held on an improvised stage, which ultimately resulted in a fiasco. While Portuguese newspapers were censored and did not report on the incident, international newspapers covered the story. The PIDE launched an extensive investigation, questioning workers, Portuguese Navy personnel, and US military staff. This investigation stretched over several months and represented a significant embarrassment for the government of Marcello Caetano. The government had planned a grand public event with NATO's top generals, Secretary-General Josef Luns, and Supreme Allied Commander of the Atlantic, Admiral Charles Duncan, to showcase Portugal's support from the international community and counteract perceptions of isolation. In their announcement, the ARA emphasized that there were no casualties and countered government claims, asserting that no operatives had been captured.

=== Attack on Muxima ===
On January 12, 1972, the ARA carried out an operation aimed at destroying new and advanced war material from France that was en route to the colonial war aboard the ship Muxima. They had gathered information on the ship's logistics from a former Milician officer who was a commander in the merchant navy. António Pedro Ferreira and Raimundo Narciso devised a plan to place a suitcase filled with explosives in the ship's hold. The suitcase would be delivered by an official customs agent, leveraging Ferreira's experience with the Transport Service Directorate to manage the luggage's routing discreetly. During a Central Committee meeting with Raimundo Narciso and Francisco Miguel, three operatives were selected for the mission: Manuel Guerreiro, Manuel Policarpo Guerreiro, and Ramiro Morgado.

Manuel dos Santos Guerreiro was tasked with purchasing a one-way ticket to Luanda to verify at customs that the suitcase's owner was indeed traveling to one of the colonies. A week later, Manuel Guerreiro visited the official forwarding agent's office to arrange for the suitcase to be sent to Luanda. The suitcase, transported to the pier in a van rented by Manuel Guerreiro, contained dishes, old books, and explosives concealed within a wooden box. The bomb detonated in the early hours of January 12, 1972, causing extensive damage to the wharf and warehouses.

The PIDE swiftly launched an investigation and interrogated anyone who might have had connections to the suitcase. Manuel Guerreiro, having booked the flight and dispatched the suitcase under a false name, led to the arrest and questioning of several individuals named António Pires. In the ARA announcement, it was declared that the operation had successfully destroyed a significant amount of ordnance destined for the colonial war and that the revolutionary struggle would persist in solidarity with the colonial peoples' fight for liberation.

Two explosions, almost in succession shook the buildings on July 24th Avenue. The pops of the explosions were heard at various points in the city, some quite far from the disaster. [...] Sheet-iron gates and metal doors from that sector of the warehouse were hurled and twisted down the wharf, while the stairway leading to the top-floor office was completely blocked by debris from collapsed brick and reinforced concrete walls. The concrete slab of the warehouse ceiling also suffered a large breach, despite being of appreciable thickness. [...] But it was actually in the warehouse that the damage was felt the most, since its reinforced concrete structure was able to resist, to some extent, the violence of the plastic loads placed there, it is not clear where or how.

— Newspaper O Século, Two explosions shook the buildings of 24 de Julho Avenue.

=== Failed action in Figueira da Foz ===
The ARA acquired information about the construction of patrol vessels in Figueira da Foz, designated for the Guinea war, including details on their operation, logistics, and other relevant aspects, from a member of the local PCP organization. Raimundo Narciso conducted a reconnaissance of the site, learning about the ships, access points, and security measures. To gather this information, Narciso took a vacation to Figueira da Foz beach with his wife. The plan, similar to the one in Cunene, involved planting an explosive on the hull of one of the ships. However, this time, it was necessary to reach the ship by swimming.

On July 25, 1972, Raimundo Narciso and Carlos Coutinho waited for the operative assigned to carry out the action. However, the operative failed to appear at the designated location or the alternative meeting points. Upon returning to Lisbon, they eventually found the operative, who apologized for the confusion, claiming he had mixed up the time and place but was now ready to proceed with the operation. Afterward, the operative reported that the mission was successful and that the bomb had been planted and set. Despite this, Raimundo Narciso was left with a negative impression of the operation, feeling that something had gone awry and doubting the excuses provided by the operative for his earlier absence.

There was no explosion, and the PIDE, in a statement, claims that a bomb was found and defused in the shipyards. ARA has never been able to clarify how the action took place.

=== Operation "Short-Circuit" ===
On August 9, 1972, the inauguration of Américo Tomás as President of the Republic was scheduled to proceed once again. Following the significant popular support for Humberto Delgado in the 1958 Portuguese presidential elections, the regime began employing an electoral college to select the President. The ARA's plan for this event involved coordinated sabotage actions aimed at disrupting power across the country, targeting Belas and Vialonga in Lisbon, Ermesinde in Oporto, and Coimbra. This operation was to be a major undertaking requiring a substantial number of operatives, with the most skilled members of the ARA, including the Central Command, selected for the task. Jaime Serra, who had recently returned from the Soviet Union, was leading this operation, marking his first action with the ARA since his return. Unlike the other two Central Command members, Jaime Serra and Francisco Miguel, Raimundo Narciso had not yet been arrested and was not widely recognized as a PCP leader. As a result, Narciso was tasked with the execution and on-ground coordination of the operation, while Serra and Miguel focused on decision-making, planning, and reconnaissance. Given the scale of the action, the entire Central Command was involved. The ARA targeted twenty steel towers of the national power grid's high-voltage lines in Lisbon, Coimbra, and Porto. The reconnaissance of these towers had been previously conducted when the organization was known as "special actions", and this was reiterated for the current operation. Francisco Miguel and Raimundo Narciso were assigned to execute the plan in Lisbon, with Miguel and his group responsible for the two towers in Belas, and Narciso and his group tasked with the six towers in Vialonga. Jaime Serra was assigned to oversee the execution in Porto, while Ângelo de Sousa was responsible for the four towers in Coimbra.

On the day of the operation, Raimundo Narciso was responsible for overseeing the execution of the plan, having delegated his duties to Carlos Coutinho. During the night of the action, Narciso traveled from Lisbon to Coimbra, and ultimately to Porto. With the assistance of the Portuguese Communist Party, which provided support in terms of transportation and accommodation—operatives were lodged in the homes of PCP members for several days—two houses were secured: one for assembling the explosives and another to serve as a clandestine laboratory, storage facility, and sleeping quarters. A total of eighty loads of explosive material, numerous detonators, watches, and hundreds of meters of electrical wire were transported and utilized. After a meticulous selection of targets to ensure the effective disruption of power while minimizing incidents, the bombs were detonated successfully, resulting in power outages that lasted several hours in various locations across the country.

According to Jaime Serra, the action "had great political repercussion and overshadowed the inauguration of the President of the Republic", and was broadcast with emphasis, being impossible to ignore. This was the last action of the ARA.

=== End of ARA ===
The ARA was suspended in May 1973. By this time, no operations had been conducted since August 1972. The decision to suspend the ARA, made by both the ARA Central Command and the Secretariat of the PCP Central Committee, was influenced by several factors. The PCP began prioritizing mass actions, workers' struggles, and unity among the opposition against the regime. This shift was part of a broader effort to reconcile with other opposition groups, notably the Portuguese Socialist Action (ASP) and progressive Catholics, which made armed actions less favorable. Contacts between the PCP and the ASP, later the Socialist Party (PS), became common since their meeting in 1972, between the delegation of Álvaro Cunhal and Carlos Brito and the delegation of Mário Soares and Ramos da Costa. In October 1973, the PCP and the newly founded PS issued a joint statement advocating for the establishment of a provisional democratic government to facilitate free elections, end the colonial war, achieve independence for the colonies, secure democratic freedoms, and combat capitalist monopolies". The ARA's statement explained that the suspension of certain actions was a strategic decision in light of the emerging broad political movement in the country, which was seen as crucial for weakening the fascist and colonialist dictatorship. The goal was to maximize the potential of other forms of anti-fascist popular struggle. Additionally, the organization had been significantly weakened by the arrest of six key operatives in 1970.

Although the ARA operated independently from the PCP, there were several connections between the two organizations. For instance, M, a worker at the Port of Lisbon who had made contact with Jaime Serra, possessed critical information that could have facilitated an ARA sabotage action. However, upon arrest, he divulged all the information he had to the police. The most damaging event for the organization was the betrayal by PCP employee Augusto Lindolfo. Lindolfo exposed militants and sympathizers of the PCP, leading the PIDE to establish a network of contacts that resulted in the capture in early 1973 of Manuel Policarpo Guerreiro, Jesuína Maria Coelho Rodrigues Guerreiro, Carlos Alberto da Silva Coutinho, Amado de Jesus Ventura da Silva, Manuel dos Santos Guerreiro, Mário Wrem Abrantes da Silva, José Augusto de Jesus Brandão, and Ramiro Rodrigues Morgado. This loss, coupled with intensified persecution by the political police, severely impeded the execution of actions. In 1973, Augusto Lindolfo survived an assassination attempt, which the PIDE attributed to the ARA, although no one claimed responsibility for the attack.

The ARA Central Command remained underground until the revolution of April 25, 1974, and was only dissolved with the fall of the dictatorial Estado Novo regime, then led by Marcello Caetano.

== Operational ==
=== Central command ===
Central Cc
Jaime Serra
Raimundo Narciso
Francisco Miguel

=== Main operational ===
Main Operational	Ref
Carlos Alberto da Silva Coutinho	
Gabriel Pedro	
Manuel dos Santos Guerreiro	
Ângelo de Sousa	
Manuel Policarpo Guerreiro	
António João Eusébio	
Ramiro Rodrigues Morgado	
António Pedro Ferreira	
Francisco Presúncia	
Maria Manuela	
Alberto Serra	
Amado de Jesus Ventura da Silva	
Jorge Trigo de Sousa	
Mário Wrem Abrantes da Silva	
Victor d'Almeida d'Eça	
José Augusto de Jesus Brandão	
Jesuína Maria Coelho Rodrigues Guerreiro	

=== After the revolution ===
After the Carnation Revolution on April 25, 1974, the ARA was dissolved, and its operatives returned to normal political life. According to one operative, "After April 25, the ARA was no longer necessary, it was no longer legitimate. Even if their operations had been justified, they lacked legitimacy in the emerging democracy".

Regarding the use of lethality, ARA operatives maintained that "our actions would not create casualties, preventing the regime from labeling us as terrorists. They could never say that. The population could also distinguish us, as they were not attacked and were not confused by our actions." Reflecting on the FP-25 attacks in the 1980s, an ARA operative commented, "[...] they killed a man in Sacavém. That man was a scoundrel, who deserved to die five hundred times, but that operation should never have happened because it challenged [...] the collective conscience, questioning the nature of a left that wanted to be necessary, just, and ethical." Thus, while the targets of FP-25 were considered legitimate, the political violence employed by the group is viewed as counterproductive to the broader struggle.

When Coutinho was arrested in 1973, he reported that he had been subjected to sleep deprivation torture for approximately 300 hours, divided into two periods: one lasting nine consecutive days and another lasting four days. He even attempted to find ways to commit suicide. Reflecting on the PIDE/DGS's response to the Tancos sabotage, Coutinho remarked: “To excuse their lack of effectiveness, the PIDE/DGS attributed to us a kind of 'superhuman ability,' superior to that of a James Bond. [...] These stories spread, with people discussing and commenting. In the Montecarlo coffee shop, which I frequented, the attack on Tancos and the 'superman' who supposedly carried it out were the main topics of conversation. I made a considerable effort not to laugh and eventually agreed with the narrative to avoid raising any suspicions".

== See also ==
- Red Brigades
- Red Army Faction
- Antifaschistische Aktion
- National Liberation Action
- Brigadas Revolucionárias
- FP-25
- Armed Forces Movement
- Grândola, Vila Morena
