= Annie Silva Pais =

Portuguese supporter of Cuban Revolution

- Annie Silva Pais in Cuba, 1965
- Born: Ana Maria Palhota da Silva Pais; 1 December 1935; Lisbon, Portugal
- Died: 13 July 1990 (aged 54); Havana, Cuba
- Known for: Her role in the Cuban Revolution

Ana Maria Palhota da Silva Pais, better known as Annie Silva Pais (1935 – 1990), was the daughter of the last director of PIDE, the secret police of the authoritarian, right-wing Estado Novo government of Portugal. Moving to Cuba to be with her diplomat husband, she became very close to the revolutionary government under Fidel Castro, eventually leaving her husband. Her story has been the subject of several books, a play and a television series.

== Early life ==
Pais was born in the Portuguese capital, Lisbon, on 1 December 1935, the only daughter of Fernando da Silva Pais and Armanda Palhota. Her upper-middle class father was appointed director of the Polícia Internacional e de Defesa do Estado (PIDE) in 1962 and served in that capacity until the Carnation Revolution of April 1974. Pais was educated in Switzerland.

In 1960, she met Swiss diplomat Raymond Quendoz and they married within three months. Christened Ana by her parents, she was nicknamed Annie by her husband. In 1962, just before the Cuban Missile Crisis she moved with him to Cuba, where he was in charge of the American Affairs section of the Swiss Embassy, with responsibilities that included decoding secret messages from the US government. Over time, she began to express enthusiasm for the revolutionaries, particularly Che Guevara, who she would meet at various diplomatic functions.

== Cuba ==
With a knowledge of German, French, Spanish, English and Portuguese, Pais began to work as a translator for the Cuban government, much to the concern of the Swiss Embassy and other diplomats. In 1965, on her fifth wedding anniversary, she did not appear when her flight from Mexico City landed at Havana. Her husband, believing that she had missed her plane, left the airport, allowing her to emerge from the plane and drive off with Communist Party representatives who were also there to meet her. Her disappearance led to allegations that she was a spy and caused the recall and interrogation of her husband. Eventually she became the translator-interpreter for Fidel Castro, being allocated an apartment in Havana and being given the same rations as other Cubans, while handing back her diplomatic passport to the Swiss.

Pais worked in the Department of Guides and Congresses at the Cuban Institute of Friendship with the Peoples (ICAP), a job only accessible to people trusted by the regime. She later worked at OSPAAAL (Organization of Solidarity with the Peoples of Africa, Asia and Latin America) and, at the same time, taught at the Abraham Lincoln School language school in Havana. During her time in Cuba, Pais is believed to have had relationships with René Vallejo, Castro's personal doctor, with the Minister of the Interior, Jose Abrantes Fernández and, possibly, with Che Guevara.

== Return to Portugal ==
Over the years, her mother tried several times to convince Pais to return to Portugal, but was not successful until she travelled to Portugal after the Carnation Revolution, when her father was in prison, in an attempt to get him released. While in Portugal, she put herself at the service of the Portuguese revolution, working as an interpreter and translator for the 5th Division, a civic organization that had been created to promote the ideals of the revolution through cultural production. She served as an interpreter for the revolutionary leader, Vasco Gonçalves, who was briefly Portuguese prime minister in 1975 and was his interpreter during a visit to Cuba. She also acted as translator and interpreter for Senén Casas Regueiro, head of the Revolutionary Armed Forces of Cuba, when he visited Portugal, and for the Cuban poet Nicolás Guillén when he visited.

== Death ==
Pais returned to Cuba in 1981, after her father's death. She died there on 13 July 1990 from breast cancer, having postponed an operation due to a work visit to North Korea, and is buried in an unmarked grave in the Colón cemetery in Havana.

== In popular culture ==
The life of Pais was the focus of a newspaper report by José Pedro Castanheira and Valdemar Cruz, written after Castanheira heard about her in an interview with a former Portuguese ambassador to Cuba, Gonzaga Ferreira. This would lead to the book A Filha Rebelde (The Rebel Daughter), by the same authors. This was followed by a play with the same name when Pais was played by Ana Brandão, which was performed at the D. Maria II National Theatre in Lisbon. In the 2022 television series adaptation, Cuba Libre, she was played by Beatriz Godinho. The play at the national theatre led to the theatre's administration being sued by her father's nephews, her cousins, who argued that the play defamed their uncle by suggesting that he was involved with the murder of former presidential candidate Humberto Delgado. The legal action was unsuccessful but media coverage served to highlight the story of Annie Pais.
