= Francisco Miguel Duarte =

Portuguese politician

Francisco Miguel Duarte, also known by the nickname Chico Sapateiro (18 December 1907 – 21 May 1988) was a Portuguese writer and a regional leader in the Portuguese Communist Party. He was a poet, whose principal subjects are revolution and the Portuguese people. Among his best known works is a poem in honor of the memory of Catarina Eufémia, his fellow countrywoman, since the author, like Eufémia, was a native of Baleizão, a village near Beja in the south of Portugal. He is also known for his book Das Prisões à Liberdade.

== Imprisonment ==
He was the leader of the regional committee of the Portuguese Communist Party in Algarve. His imprisonment in 1947 seriously weakened that provincial organization. He was the last political prisoner, remaining alone for six months, in the concentration camp of Tarrafal - the penal colony of Cape Verde - before being transferred, again, to Lisbon on January 26, 1954, where he was imprisoned first in Aljube and then in Caxias prison.

== Election ==
He was elected a member of the Portuguese parliament by the constituency of Beja in the election of April 25, 1975, the first free election after 48 years of dictatorship.

== See also ==
- Armed Revolutionary Action
