= José de Mello =

José de Mello or José de Melo may refer to:

== People ==
- António José de Melo, a colonial governor of Mozambique 1837
- Custódio José de Melo (1840–1902), Brazilian sailor and politician
- João José de Melo, a governor of Portuguese India 1768–1774
- José de Melo, Metropolitan archbishop of the Roman Catholic Archdiocese of Évora 1611–1633
- Dom José de Melo (fl. c. 1769), King of Balibo, a ruler of Timor

== Other uses ==
- Estádio José de Melo, or Stadium José de Melo, a multi-use stadium in Rio Branco, Brazil
- Grupo José de Mello, a Portuguese shareholder group

== See also ==
- José de Melo Carvalho Muniz Freire (1861–1918), Brazilian politician, governor Espirito Santo
- Retrato del arzobispo José de Melo ('Portrait of Archbishop José de Melo'), a painting by Juan Bautista Maíno (1581–1649)
