= José Manuel de Mello =

Portuguese businessman

- Born: December 8, 1927; Cascais, Portugal
- Died: September 16, 2009 (aged 81); Portugal
- Occupation: Businessman
- Children: 12

José Manuel de Mello (December 8, 1927 – September 16, 2009), was a Portuguese businessman who founded the conglomerate Grupo José de Mello. He was the heir of an older industrial conglomerate, Companhia União Fabril (CUF), which had been founded by his grandfather Alfredo da Silva.

== Career ==
José Manuel started to work for CUF until the Carnation Revolution military coup in Lisbon, on April 25, 1974. With the pro-communist inspiration of the radical events that followed the coup, José Manuel de Mello had to leave the country in 1975.

Some years later, as democracy and modern capitalism prevailed in post-revolutionary Portugal, Mello, like many other political refugees of the entrepreneurial class, returned to his country. He then resumed his business activities and ultimately built a business conglomerate - the Grupo José de Mello with strong interests on motorway infrastructure, healthcare and chemicals.

== Personal life ==
He had 12 children.
