= Caxias (Oeiras) =

- Civil parish
- Location in Portugal
- Coordinates: 38.702°N 9.276°W
- Country: Portugal
- Region: Lisbon
- District: Lisbon
- Municipality: Oeiras
- Disbanded: 2013

Area
  - Total: 3.41 km^{2} (1.32 sq mi)

Population (2011)
  - Total: 9,007
  - Density: 2,640/km^{2} (6,840/sq mi)
- Time zone: UTC+00:00 (WET)
  - Summer (DST): UTC+01:00 (WEST)
- Website: www.jf-caxias.pt

Caxias (European Portuguese: [kɐˈʃi.ɐʃ]) is a former civil parish in the municipality of Oeiras, Portugal. In 2013, the parish merged into the new parish Oeiras e São Julião da Barra, Paço de Arcos e Caxias. The population in 2011 was 9,007, in an area of 3.41 km².

== From pre-history to Rome ==
The area was developed alongside the Ribeira de Barcarena, through four stations classified by the Archaeological Chart of the Municipality: during the Paleolíthic, near the Quinta do Jardim (estação nº.74), in the immediate surroundings of Laveiras (nº.76) and at the beach near the São Bruno's Fort, in the confluence with the Ribeira de Barcarena (nº.77); and probably, in the Neolithic, in the Laveiras Station (Above mentioned).

At the station nº.75 in Laveiras, a tomb stone of Flavius Wuadratus of the II Roman Legion was found, validating the Roman presence in the area.

== Prison ==
Caxias became infamous for its prison, used by the Estado Novo regime (and its secret police, the PIDE) for the imprisonment of political dissidents between the 1930s and the Carnation Revolution in 1974.

== Heritage ==
- Fort of São Bruno
- Gardens, sculptures and two rooms with decorative paintings at the old Paço Real de Caxias
