= Fort of Giribita =

17th-century fort in Portugal

- Forte de Nossa Senhora de Porto Salvo
- Lisbon District, Near Oeiras in Portugal
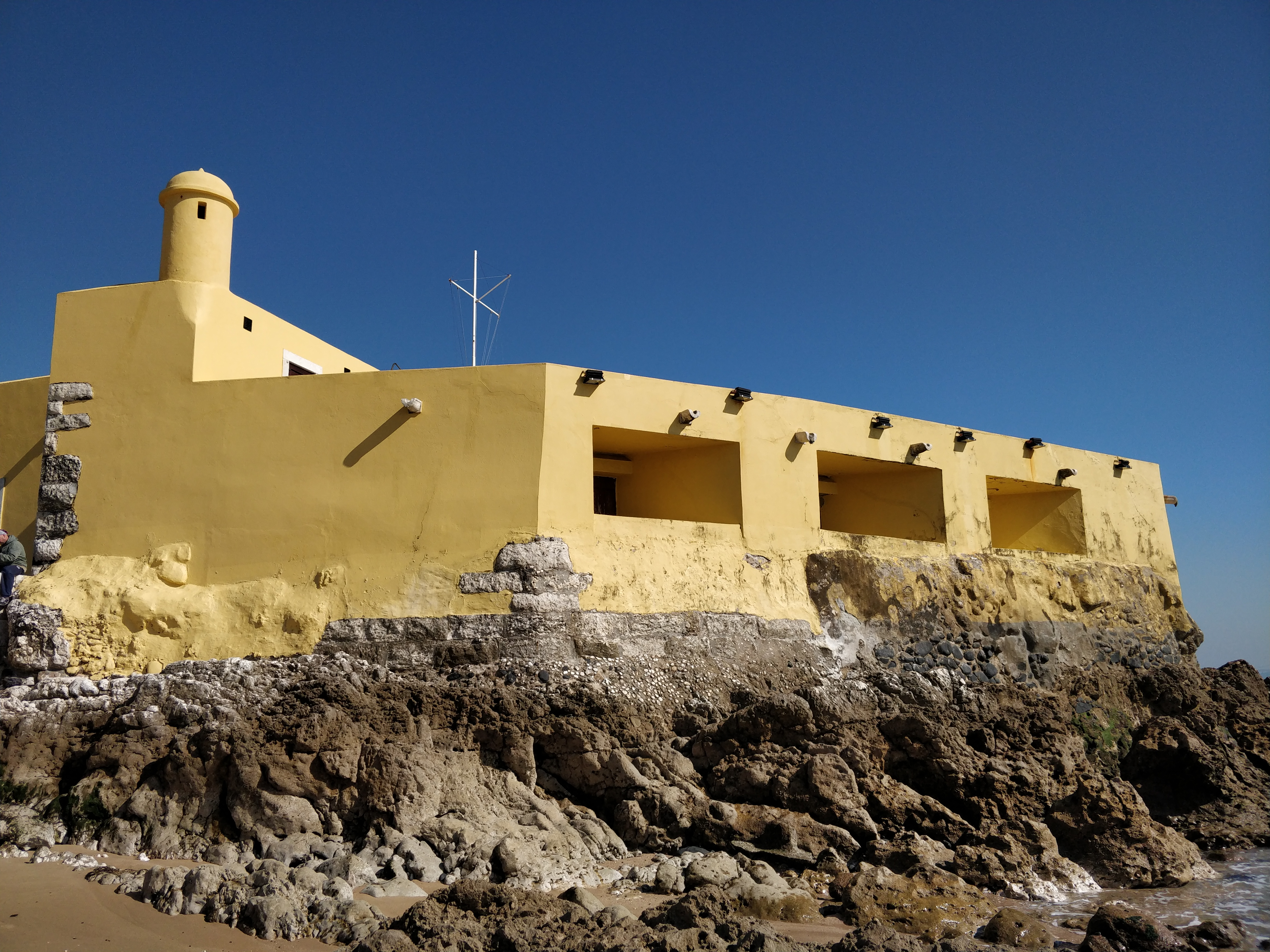
- View of the fort from the west

Site information
- Type: Fort
- Owner: National Government
- Open to the public: No

Location
- Coordinates: 38°41′50″N 9°16′57″W

Site history
- Built: 1649
- Built by: António Luís de Meneses, 1st Marquis of Marialva
- Fate: Well-preserved

Garrison information
- Occupants: Portuguese Navy

The Fort of Giribita, also referred to as the Fort of Our Lady of Porto Salvo and the Fort of Ponta do Guincho, is located on the right bank of the Tagus estuary, in the municipality of Oeiras, District of Lisbon, in Portugal. It was completed in 1649 during the Portuguese Restoration War (1640-1668), as part of the fortifications of Lisbon that stretched from Cabo da Roca on the Atlantic coast to Belém Tower close to Lisbon. It could exchange crossfire with the Fort of São Bruno to its east.

== History ==
The fort, which is relatively small, was built on a rocky outcrop into the Tagus estuary in a Mannerist style. It has a pentagonal outline, with the roof covered by a terrace, with two circular bartizans. There are six gaps in the walls for gun emplacements. Using the site of an earlier artillery battery, the Fort of Giribita was rebuilt and enlarged as a result of a decision of the Council of War created by King John IV. Work was supervised by António Luís de Meneses, 1st Marquis of Marialva and was completed in 1649, according to the inscription on the entrance. By 1735 a report noted that the fort had just two pieces of artillery, with a further five not fit for service. In 1763 it was reportedly armed with 7 cannon but by 1824 the functioning artillery was again back to just two pieces. During the Portuguese Civil War (1828-1834) the Fort of Giribita was armed with 22 gunners and seven cannon.

In 1873 work began on restoration and in 1877 the fort was assigned to the Defence Commission of Lisbon, which used it as a deposit for torpedo material, a function which it still exercised in 1911, the first year of the First Portuguese Republic after the 5 October 1910 revolution. Some repairs were carried out in 1911. In 1942 it was handed over to the Ministry of Finance. Prior to that, its surrounding environment had been completely changed by construction of the EN6 highway, known as the Marginal, connecting Lisbon with Cascais along the river and coastline, which passes within a few metres of the fort. After the Carnation Revolution in 1974, it was handed over to the Directorate of Naval Infrastructure in 1975.
