= Fernando da Silva Pais =

Leader of Secret Police under the Estado Novo of Portugal

Fernando da Silva Pais ComC CvA GOIH
- Born: Fernando Eduardo da Silva Pais; 16 November 1905; Barreiro, Portugal
- Died: 27 January 1981 (aged 75); Lisbon, Portugal
- Known for: Leader of Portugal's secret police

Fernando Eduardo da Silva Pais ComC CvA GOIH (1905–1981) was a Portuguese military officer and intelligence chief. He is best known for being the last leader of the PIDE, the secret police of the right-wing, authoritarian Estado Novo government in Portugal.

== Early life ==
Silva Pais was born in the parish of Barreiro in the Setúbal District of Portugal on 16 November 1905. After studying engineering, he enlisted as a recruit in 1926 and attended military school in 1927. He married Armanda Palhota, with whom, in 1935, he had a daughter, Annie Silva Pais, who would become a supporter of the communist government in Cuba. In 1943, he was promoted to captain. On 6 April 1962 he was appointed director of the Polícia Internacional e de Defesa do Estado (PIDE) by the prime minister, António de Oliveira Salazar.

== Director of PIDE ==
The PIDE was responsible for finding, imprisoning, interrogating and torturing political opponents of the government. There were many deaths in custody. In 1965, the former candidate for president, Humberto Delgado, and his Brazilian secretary, Arajaryr Campos, were assassinated close to the Spanish border, where they had been attempting to re-enter Portugal. Silva Pais always denied any involvement with this, although it is generally believed that Delgado was shot by Casimiro Monteiro, a PIDE agent.

== Arrest and death ==
During the Carnation Revolution of 25 April 1974, that led to the overthrow of the Estado Novo, he allegedly ordered agents to open fire on the crowd that gathered in the streets of Porto, but this order was not respected. Silva Pais remained in his office in Lisbon overnight and surrendered early on the morning of the 26th. According to him, António de Spínola, who would become the first president after the revolution, told him that he had 24 hours to leave the country, but he refused and was arrested on 27 April and detained in Caxias prison. He eventually went to trial regarding the Delgado Case, but all proceedings were dropped after his death, on 27 January 1981.

== Aftermath ==
A play inspired by his daughter's time in Cuba, performed at the D. Maria II National Theatre in Lisbon, suggested that he was responsible for Delgado's death. The theatre's administration was sued by his nephews, who argued that the play defamed their uncle. In 2011 it was announced that the legal action had been unsuccessful.

== Distinctions ==
=== National orders ===
- Commander of the Order of Christ (15 September 1948)
- Officer of the Order of Christ (21 June 1944)
- Knight of the Order of Aviz (9 June 1941)
- Grand Officer of the Order of Prince Henry the Navigator (20 November 1968)
