= Fort of São Bruno =

17th-century fort in Portugal

- Forte de São Bruno
- Lisbon District, Near Oeiras in Portugal
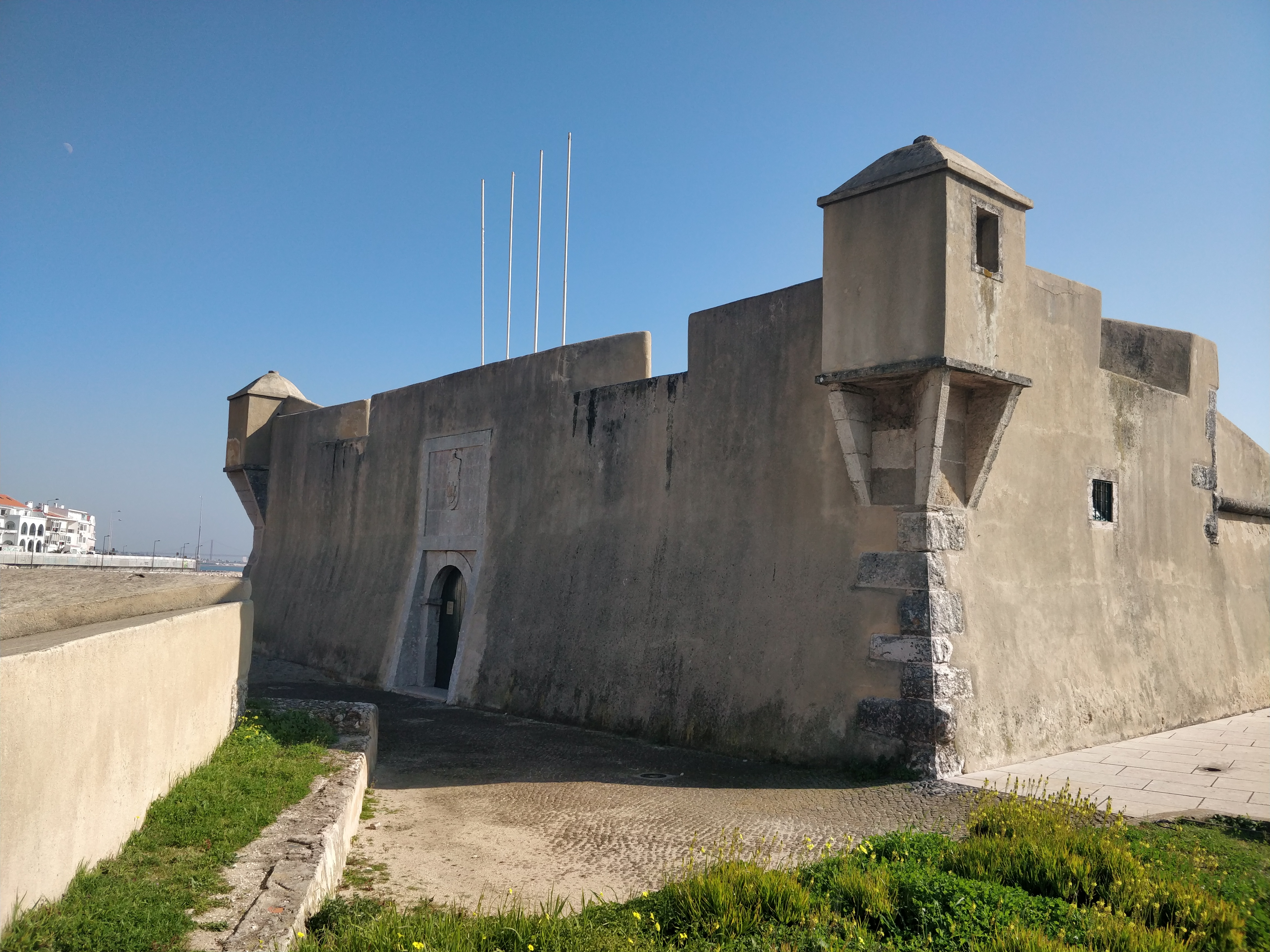
- View of the fort

Site information
- Type: Fort
- Owner: Oeiras municipality

Location
- Coordinates: 38°41′53″N 9°16′29″W

Site history
- Built: 1647-49
- Built by: António Luís de Meneses, 1st Marquis of Marialva
- Fate: Well-preserved

Garrison information
- Occupants: Associação Portuguesa dos Amigos dos Castelos

The Fort of São Bruno is situated on the estuary of the River Tagus in Caxias, Oeiras municipality, near Lisbon in Portugal. It was built in 1647 and became operational in 1649 as part of the construction of a line of forts to control access to Lisbon, which stretched from Cabo da Roca on the Atlantic coast to the Belém Tower near Lisbon. The fort is well preserved, following its original design, and is considered one of the most attractive examples of maritime military architecture on the Portuguese coast. It presently serves as the headquarters of the Associação Portuguesa dos Amigos dos Castelos (Portuguese association of friends of castles).

== History ==
During the Portuguese Restoration War, King John IV of Portugal identified the need to strengthen Lisbon's defences in the face of attacks by the Spanish navy. In 1647 he ordered construction of a fort at Caxias to improve the defence of the right bank of the Tagus by making possible crossfire with the Fort of Nossa Senhora do Vale (Our Lady of the Valley) to the east, now demolished, and the Fort of Giribita to the west, thus reinforcing the major Fort of São Julião da Barra to the west. António Luís de Meneses, 1st Marquis of Marialva, was given responsibility for the work.

Built on a rocky outcrop into the river estuary, the Fort of São Bruno (taking its name from a nearby convent) is in the shape of a star around a raised central square. Following a Mannerist style, it was built with batteries targeted at both the estuary and towards the land, together with rectangular bartizans on the front corners. The entrance to the interior is through a large arched gate, on which was placed the shield of Portugal, with the date 1647. It was equipped with cannon in 1649. A military inspection carried out in 1735 reported that the fort was deactivated and all its artillery had been destroyed. It also stated that at least one of the lower batteries had been invaded by sand. Some repairs took place in 1751 and the fort seems to have emerged relatively unscathed from the 1755 Lisbon earthquake. Throughout the 18th century the fort was deactivated on several occasions and was reported on one occasion to be occupied by farmers. However, it was again in operation during the Spanish-Portuguese War of 1762–1763, being armed with 16 cannon.

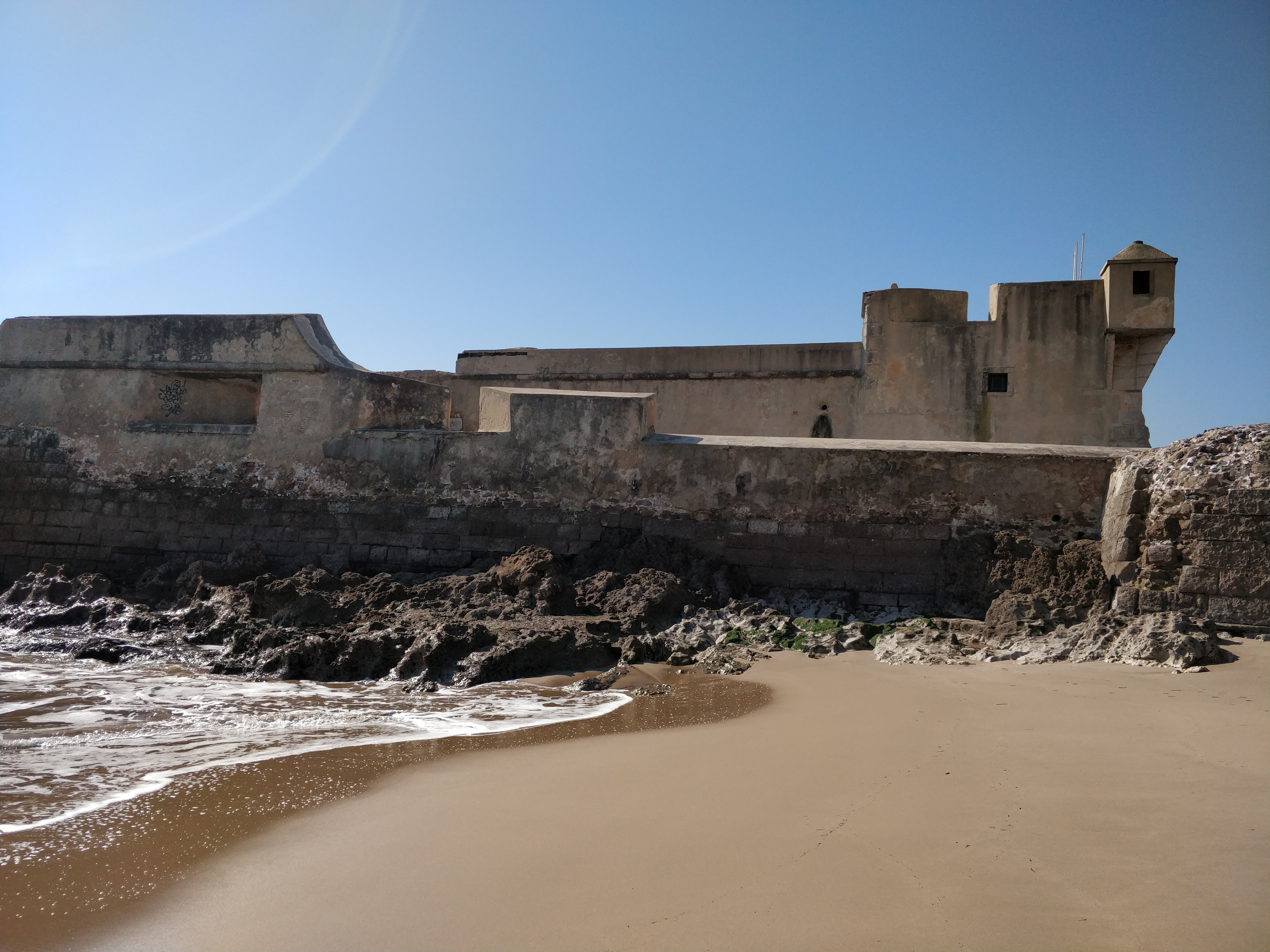
View of the fort from the east

King Miguel I used the fort in 1831 for target practice, using its artillery to aim at barges moored in the middle of the Tagus for that purpose. These were the only occasions on which artillery has been fired from the fort. With the end of the Portuguese Civil War the fort was once again deactivated. After that it ceased to be used for military purposes and in 1888 was leased to a private individual for nine years. In 1902 it was handed back to the Government and in 1903 occupied by the Guarda Fiscal, the Portuguese Customs and Excise department, to guard against smuggling. The Guarda Fiscal was responsible for it until 1946, although in 1941 it was used as a sailing centre by the Mocidade Portuguesa, a youth organization of the right-wing Estado Novo Government. A well-supported campaign in 1999-2000 for the restoration of the fort and improvements to the surrounding area led to significant work being carried out by the Oeiras municipality.
