= Companhia União Fabril =

Portuguese business conglomerate

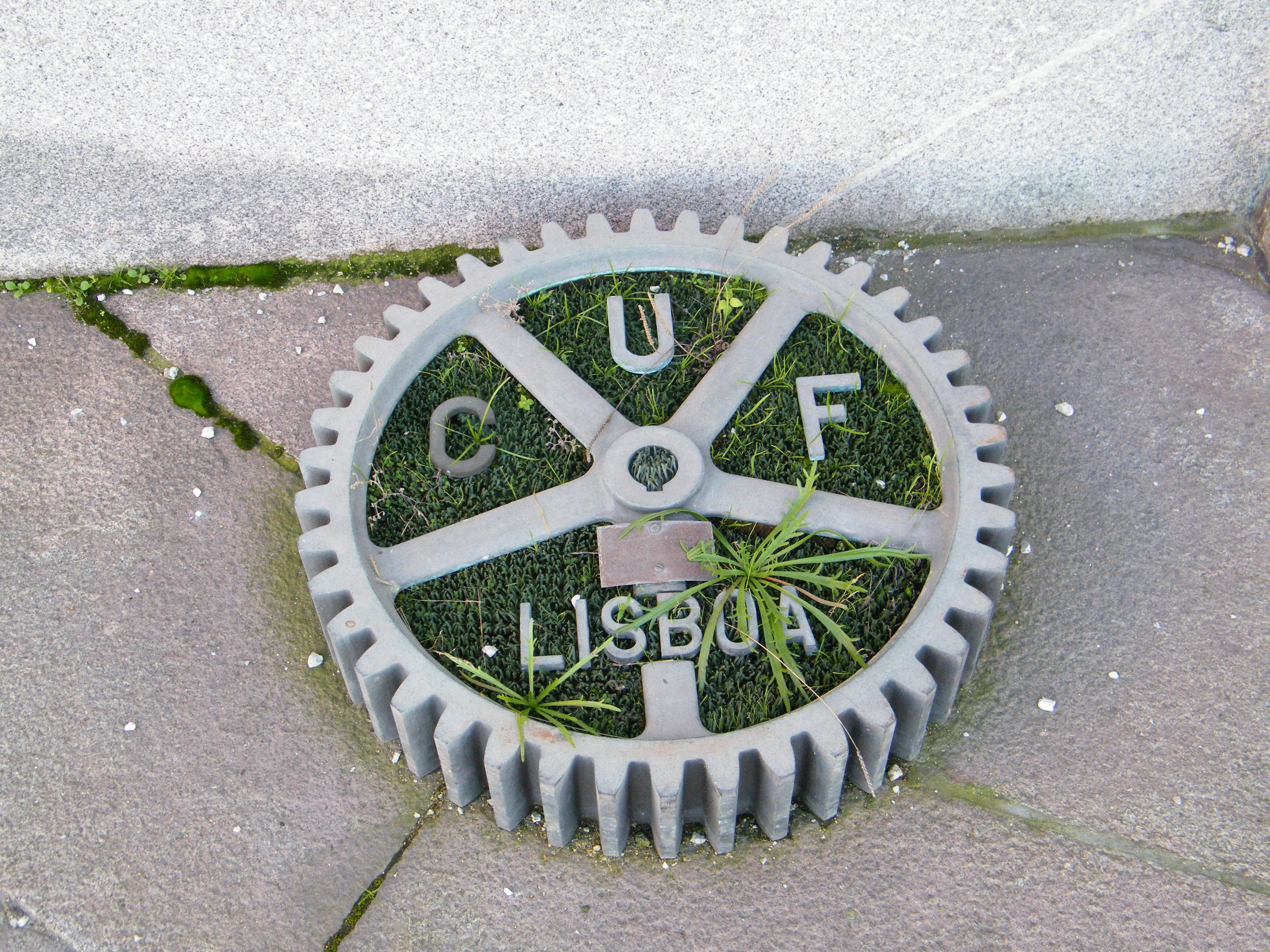
Commemorative historical marker of CUF.

The Companhia União Fabril (CUF) was one of the largest and oldest Portuguese business conglomerates. It first acquired a powerful position through the fruits of the Portuguese colonial empire. Subsequently, it grew into a major conglomerate from the 1930s to 1974. Throughout this period, CUF was at the forefront of the economy of Portuguese Guinea. It later became a chemical corporation which was by then a part of Grupo José de Mello founded in 1988. After many acquisitions, mergers and divestitures, from the late 1970s to the 2010s, the company known as CUF and its brand was gradually restructured and morphed into a brand-new hospital in Lisbon. Now the brand cuf, whose major shareholders and founders are heirs of the old CUF conglomerate, is tied to one of the major healthcare providers of Portugal known as cuf saúde with several hospitals and clinics across the country and formerly known as José de Melo Saúde, a healthcare provider which is a division of Grupo José de Mello. The chemical industry businesses were consolidated in 2018 into a new brand and company called Bondalti which was established within the Grupo José de Mello.

== History ==
The original Companhia União Fabril was founded in 1865. In 1898, under the businessman Alfredo da Silva, it was merged with the Companhia Aliança Fabril (founded in 1880) to create the CUF. CUF benefited greatly from the Portuguese colonial empire from its early years on. Its soaps contained vegetable oils from Guinea and Angola.

CUF was managed by da Silva's descendants, including José Manuel de Mello, as a family-run business conglomerate. It was one of the largest and most diversified Portuguese corporations from the 1930s until 1974. The company grew and developed as a large conglomerate enforcing a business model with similarities to South Korean chaebols and Japanese keiretsus and zaibatsus. With its core businesses (cement, chemicals, petrochemicals, agrochemicals, textiles, beer, beverages, metallurgy, naval construction, electrical equipment, oilseeds, insurance, banking, wood pulp, tourism, mining, etc.) and corporate headquarters located in mainland Portugal, but also with branches, plants and several developing business projects all around the Portuguese Empire, specially in the Portuguese territories of Angola and Mozambique, CUF was for many years the largest employer and exporter of Portugal. It grew so large that it reached 30 kilometers of private railway lines in Portugal.

Throughout the First Republic and the Estado Novo regime, CUF maintained an "oligopoly" in Portuguese Guinea. Writing in 1962, Perry Anderson described CUF as the "archetype of the Portuguese cartels". He further stated that "[t]hrough its subsidiary, Gouveia, CUF all but owns Portuguese Guinea: it has a monopoly of all wholesale and retail commerce, the rice and peanut industries, and all transport." On 3 August 1959, the PIDE massacred at least 25 workers who were striking against low wages and poor working conditions at Gouveia's Port of Bissau docks, in what would become known as the Pidjiguiti massacre. Aside from its role in Portuguese Guinea, CUF was also predominant in the other African colonies. It was responsible for imports and exports, naval construction, plantations and insurance. In the 1960s, most of its colonial profits originated from Angolan cotton, leather and sisal.

After the Carnation Revolution military coup on April 25, 1974, the fall of the far-right Estado Novo regime that ruled the country and its Colonial Empire from 1933 to 1974, and the subsequent Processo Revolucionário em Curso (PREC), CUF entered in collapse. Many of its companies were nationalized by the socialist-inspired National Salvation Junta, and the large conglomerate and many of its diverse companies didn't survive the PREC (1975) and its influence over Portuguese economy, society and government policies in the following years. However, after the turmoil of the Carnation Revolution from 1974 to 1976, its more leftist inspiration fade away from 1977 to 1978. In 1979, the founding family (the Mellos) was able to resume its business activity in Portugal and would proceed to found the Grupo José de Mello (José de Mello Group) in 1988.

Step by step, the CUF was revived with the acquisition of several chemical industry assets in the country from the 1980s to 1997, when it was in position to buy Quimigal (founded after the forcible nationalizations as the chemical company of the State) in the privatization of that company. During the 1990s and 2000s, CUF's main industrial assets were located in Estarreja where the company produced aniline and nitrobenzene. Also in the 2000s, the company started to develop innovative projects in other fields. The nanotechnology company Innovnano was founded in 2003 by CUF in Aljustrel. Its main facilities, including state-of-the-art research and development center and manufacturing plant, were scheduled to be relocated to the Coimbra's iParque in 2012. In the 2010s, the new CUF was a Portuguese chemical corporation and a part of Grupo José de Mello. After many acquisitions, mergers and divestitures, from the late 1970s to the 2010s, the company and its brand was gradually restructured and morphed into a hospital in Lisbon. Now the brand cuf, whose major shareholders and founders are heirs of the old CUF conglomerate, is tied to one of the majors healthcare providers of Portugal known as cuf saúde. In 2018, the remaining industrial assets and historical industrial tradition in the chemical industry with roots on the original CUF had been transferred to a new Portuguese chemical company called Bondalti.

=== Cultural endeavours of CUF ===
The company had also its own multisports clubs, founded as truly works teams. This model of sport ownership, also put in place by contemporary companies like Bayer AG, Carl Zeiss AG, Philips NV, Peugeot and others, was successfully replicated and expanded by notable companies of the following century like Red Bull GmbH. The most successful sports club of CUF was founded in 1937 and was located in Lisbon's industrial suburb of Barreiro on the left side of Tagus estuary, and was called Grupo Desportivo da CUF. The multisports club was a major contender in the main Portuguese Football Championship and also competed through other sports departments and sporting disciplines such as cycling, rowing and rink hockey, but was later disbanded and replaced by G.D. Fabril due to the 1974 military coup in Portugal. This sports club in Barreiro was only one of three sports clubs created by the parent conglomerate company, whose players and athletes were also workers. The other clubs were CUF Lisboa, founded in 1936 and now known as Unidos de Lisboa, and the short-lived CUF Porto, that existed between 1945 and 1950.

== See also ==
- Sovena Group
