= Revolução sem sangue =

- Theatrical release poster
- Directed by: Rui Pedro Sousa
- Based on: Esquecidos em Abril by Fábio Monteiro
- Release date: 11 April 2024 (Portugal)
- Country: Portugal
- Language: Portuguese

Revolução sem sangue (lit. Revolution without blood) is a 2024 Portuguese film directed by Rui Pedro Sousa. The film, the director's debut feature, was released on 11 April 2024 in Portugal near the 50th anniversary of the Carnation Revolution, which it depicts. Despite that revolution being largely considered a "bloodless" one, the film focuses on four (Note: The official number of victims is 5.) persons who were killed during the events. That is why the title, after being shown as Revolução sem sangue in the opening credits is stylised Revolução ~~sem~~ sangue (Revolution ~~without~~ blood) in the end credits (which is rendered as Revolução (sem) sangue in certain media).

The film is based on real events that took place on 24–26 April 1974, in Lisbon.

== Premise ==
João Arruda is an Azorean student at the University of Lisbon and is interested in Marxism and political philosophy. Fernando Giesteira works as a bartender, in the hope of studying later. Fernando Reis is a soldier, coming home to Lisbon for a few days.The path of the three young men, hoping for more freedom in the country, leads them in front of the seat of the PIDE, in Lisbon, on 25 April 1974. There, António Lage works as a civil servant, but his scruples become unbearable when he witnesses a young woman (Inês) being tortured, and he decides to quit his position. As the radio reports that a growing gathering of the population supported by the army is happening in the city, the director of the PIDE decides to have compromising documents burnt and let Inês be released in the morning. But in the evening she comes back among the crowd, accompanied by her young daughter, to join the demonstrations and shout her anger before the seat of the PIDE. From the windows of the building, the PIDE starts shooting on the crowd. Inês is hit by a bullet but Fernando Reis manages to drag her unconscious out of the shooters' range. João Arruda and Fernando Giesteira are shot, while Fernando Reis is accidentally shot by another soldier while trying to catch Lage, who had surrendered but is also shot as he is running away. All four men die; the fate of Inês is unclear.

== Cast ==
- Lucas Dutra as Fernando Giesteira
- Rafael Paes as João Arruda
- Diogo Fernandes as Fernando Reis
- Manuel Nabais as António Lage
- Teresa Vieira as Inês
- Helena Caldeira as Rita, Fernando Giesteira's girlfriend
- João Arrais

== Production ==
The film was shot on location in Lisbon. It was produced with the help of the victims' families.

== Release ==
In Portugal, the film was released in theaters on 11 April 2024, before the semi-centennial of the revolution. It aired in Galician at Televisión de Galicia the night of 24 April and was also available in the streaming platform AGalega for 24 hours. On 18 July, it became available on Max. It first aired in Spanish theaters on 7 July 2025 at the 31th Festival Ibérico de Cinema, which it opened. On 24 April 2025, the film aired on RTP1, making its debut on Portuguese television.

== Reception ==
Público found the film sincere but as surprising in its good as in its bad aspects. Another review praised the intentions of the film.

Revolução (sem) Sangue was seen by 20 000 people in Portugal, becoming 2024's fourth most seen Portuguese film in the country.

The film was selected by the Portuguese Film Academy as a candidate for Best Ibero-American Feature Film of the 2024 Macondo Awards in Colombia. It had ten nominations in nine categories at the 2025 Sophia Awards and won one: João Arrais as Best Supporting Actor.
