= António Vicente Campinas =

Portuguese poet

António Vicente Campinas (1910–1998) was a Portuguese poet from Algarve. His works include the book Raiz da Serenidade.

== Works ==
He began publishing poetry in 1938, with the book Aguarelas. Among his poetic works is the book Raiz da Serenidade. In 1952 he published his first novel "Fronteiriços", dedicated to smugglers. He also published books of short stories, with a poem in memory of Catarina Eufémia.
