= Baleizão =

- Civil parish
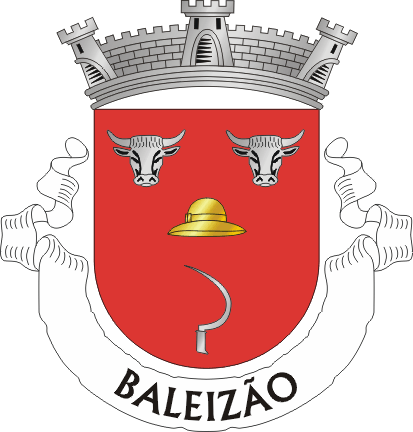
- Coat of arms

- Location in Portugal
- Coordinates: 38.026°N 7.714°W
- Country: Portugal
- Region: Alentejo
- Intermunic. comm.: Baixo Alentejo
- District: Beja
- Municipality: Beja

Area
  - Total: 139.74 km^{2} (53.95 sq mi)

Population (2011)
  - Total: 902
  - Density: 6.5/km^{2} (17/sq mi)
- Time zone: UTC+00:00 (WET)
  - Summer (DST): UTC+01:00 (WEST)

Baleizão is a Portuguese freguesia ("civil parish") of the municipality of Beja. The population in 2011 was 902, in an area of 139.74 km^{2}.

The parish contains Monte do Olival ("Hill of the Olive Grove"), where Catarina Eufémia was murdered in 1954. She subsequently became a national icon of the resistance against the Estado Novo regime.
