= Head of state succession =

Head of state succession is the process by which nations transfer leadership of their highest office from one person to another. The succession of a head of state can be brought about through various means, the most common of which include:

- Death of the current head of state
- A military coup d'état against the present government
- A general election
- A vote of no confidence by the national legislature
- Hereditary succession or appointment by a predetermined council
- Resignation (usually of a president)
- Impeachment (usually of a president)
- Abdication (usually of a monarch)

== Dramatic portrayals ==
The changing of national leadership has been the topic of several films, novels, and television series, including the following:

- The film Der Untergang details the last days of the Third Reich to include the succession procedure enacted by Nazi Germany after the death of Adolf Hitler
- Star Trek VI: The Undiscovered Country dealt with the succession of the Klingon Chancellor after an assassination against the reigning Klingon Head of State. Several episodes of Star Trek: The Next Generation dealt more in depth with the exact procedures of transferring the leadership of the Klingon High Council from one person to another.
- Although Battlestar Galactica (2003) is not set on Earth, the political structures of the 12 Colonies of Kobol closely resemble those of the United States. During the Cylon attack, Secretary of Education Laura Roslin receives a message from the Case Orange automated beacon, a special mechanism seeking communication with any surviving Colonial government officials. After verifying her identity, she learns that—other than herself—all members of President Richard Adar's government have apparently been killed or are missing. The Case Orange response assigns Roslin new instructions, and she (the 43rd in the line of succession) is duly sworn in as president.
- King Ralph: The entire British Royal Family is killed in a freak accident, and controversially the next person in line to the throne is a working-class American (John Goodman).
