= Eduardo Valente da Fonseca =

Portuguese writer

Eduardo Valente da Fonseca (Aveiro, 1928–2003) was a Portuguese writer. He collaborated on literary supplements for journals such as Comércio do Porto, Jornal de Notícias, Vértice and the Jornal de Letras. Other than writing features for journals and children's literature, he was also a poet.

His poem "Canto do Ceifeiro", with music by Francisco Fernandes was included in the LP "Cancões da Cidade Nova", by Francisco Fanhais.
