= Rio de Mouro =

Town in the municipality of Sintra, Portugal

- Civil parish
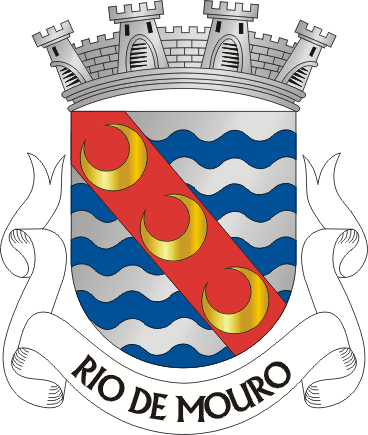
- Coat of arms

- Location in Portugal
- Coordinates: 38.784°N 9.322°W
- Country: Portugal
- Region: Lisbon
- Metropolitan area: Lisbon
- District: Lisbon
- Municipality: Sintra

Area
  - Total: 16.49 km^{2} (6.37 sq mi)

Population (2011)
  - Total: 47,311
  - Density: 2,869/km^{2} (7,431/sq mi)
- Time zone: UTC+00:00 (WET)
  - Summer (DST): UTC+01:00 (WEST)
- Website: jf-riodemouro.pt

Rio de Mouro (European Portuguese pronunciation: [ˈʁi.u ðɨ ˈmoɾu]) is a town and civil parish in the municipality of Sintra, Portugal. It is located at a distance of 15 km from the capital, Lisbon. The population in 2011 was 47,311, in an area of 16.49 km^{2}.

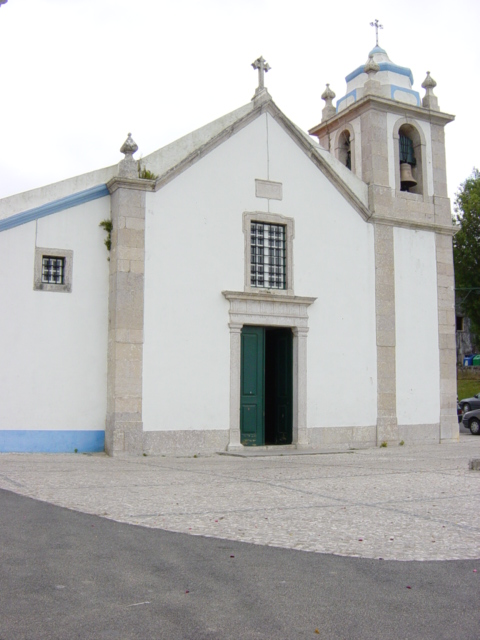
Church of Nossa Senhora de Belém (16th century)
