= Jaime Serra (politician) =

Portuguese politician (1921–2022)

Member of the Assembly of the Republic of Portugal
- In office 1976–1985

Member of the Constituent Assembly of Portugal
- In office 1975

Personal details
- Born: Jaime dos Santos Serra; 22 January 1921 Lisbon, Portugal
- Died: 9 February 2022 (aged 101)
- Party: PCP

Jaime dos Santos Serra (22 January 1921 – 9 February 2022) was a Portuguese politician.

A member of the Portuguese Communist Party, he served in the Assembly of the Republic from 1976 to 1985. He died on 9 February 2022, at the age of 101.
