= Grupo José de Mello =

José de Mello Group is a family-based and family-controlled Portuguese shareholder group and the family office of the de Mello family. It is one of Portugal's largest corporate groups. The Group has its origin in Companhia União Fabril, which was founded in 1898 by Alfredo da Silva.

== Core businesses and joint ownership ==
The José de Mello Group has stakes in companies that operate in different business areas: healthcare (cuf saúde); chemicals and water treatment (Bondalti); homes and services for seniors (José de Mello Residências e Serviços); infrastructure and mobility (Brisa); wines (Ravasqueira); maintenance and services (ATM).
