= UJC =

UJC might refer to:

- Urban Justice Center, New York City, US
- Universidade Joaquim Chissano, Cidade de Maputo
- United Jewish Communities, US
- Unión de Jóvenes Comunistas, Cuban political youth organisation
- Union de la jeunesse congolaise, a Congolese youth organisation
- União dos Jovens Comunistas, formerly the youth wing of the Portuguese Communist Party
- United Jihad Council
- United Jupiter Company, fictional corporation from 2022 video game “The Callisto Protocol”
