= Portuguese Maximalist Federation =

Portuguese revolutionary organization

Portuguese Maximalist Federation Federação Maximalista Portuguesa
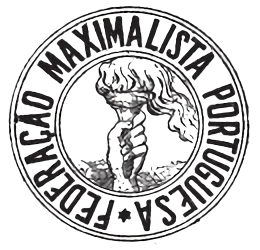
- Abbreviation: FMP
- Founded: April 27, 1919
- Dissolved: March 6, 1921
- Split from: Portuguese Socialist Party
- Succeeded by: Portuguese Communist Party
- Headquarters: Lisbon
- Newspaper: Bandeira Vermelha
- Ideology: Revolutionary socialism Anarcho-syndicalism; Maximalism
- Colours: Red

The Portuguese Maximalist Federation (Portuguese: Federação Maximalista Portuguesa or FMP) was a revolutionary movement founded on April 27, 1919 in Lisbon. The organization was inspired by the most radical factions involved in the Russian Revolution of 1917, and was mostly composed by anarchists, syndicalists and the revolutionary left of the Portuguese Socialist Party.

== History ==
Towards the end of World War I, Portugal fell into a serious economic crisis, in part due to the Portuguese military intervention in the war. The Portuguese working classes responded to the deterioration in their living standards with a wave of strikes. Supported by an emerging labour movement, the workers achieved some of their objectives, such as an eight-hour working day. But a feeling of political powerlessness, the lack of a coherent political strategy among the Portuguese working class and the growing popularity of the Russian Revolution, led to the foundation of the Portuguese Maximalist Federation (FMP) on April 27, 1919. The goal of FMP was to promote socialist and revolutionary ideas and to organize and develop the worker movement.

One of the main figures of the organization was Manuel Ribeiro, director of the federation's weekly newspaper Bandeira Vermelha. At the beginning of the 20th century, revolutionary syndicalists were opposed to purist anarchism, and defended Georges Sorel's position that only the trade union held the capacity to achieve a revolution. However, the Maximalists never failed to assert themselves as anarchists. For the maximalists the "proletarian army of conscientious men" was the only weapon against the bourgeoisie, one that could bring anarchism to operate in the masses and syndicalism to organize the economy.

In issue number 2 of Red Flag, the maximalists launched a program for social reorganization, in which they outlined a future maximalist society. The first step to be taken would be the abolition of private property and the right of production and consumption for all. Its other proposals included "the abolition of inheritances, the abolition of taxes, the suppression of public debt, the extinction of prostitution, free medical care, the prohibition of the sale of alcoholic beverages, the abolition of gambling and the implementation of religious freedom."

On October 5, 1919, the FMP launched its weekly publication, the Bandeira Vermelha (Red Flag), a newspaper that became very popular with the Portuguese working classes, eventually reaching a circulation of 6,000 newspapers. Although it is not possible to specify an exact number of militants in the federation, maximalist nuclei were found throughout much of the country:

	Lisbon	Porto	Coimbra	Madeira	Faro	Viana do Castelo	Braga
Maximalist Councils	28	1	1	1			
Communist Center	1	1			1	1	
Communist Groups		3					1

After some time, members of the FMP began to feel the need for a "revolutionary vanguard" among Portuguese workers. After several meetings at various trade union offices, and with the aid of the Comintern, the Portuguese Communist Party (PCP) was founded on March 6, 1921.
