= Communist Students' League =

Student wing of the Portuguese Communist Party

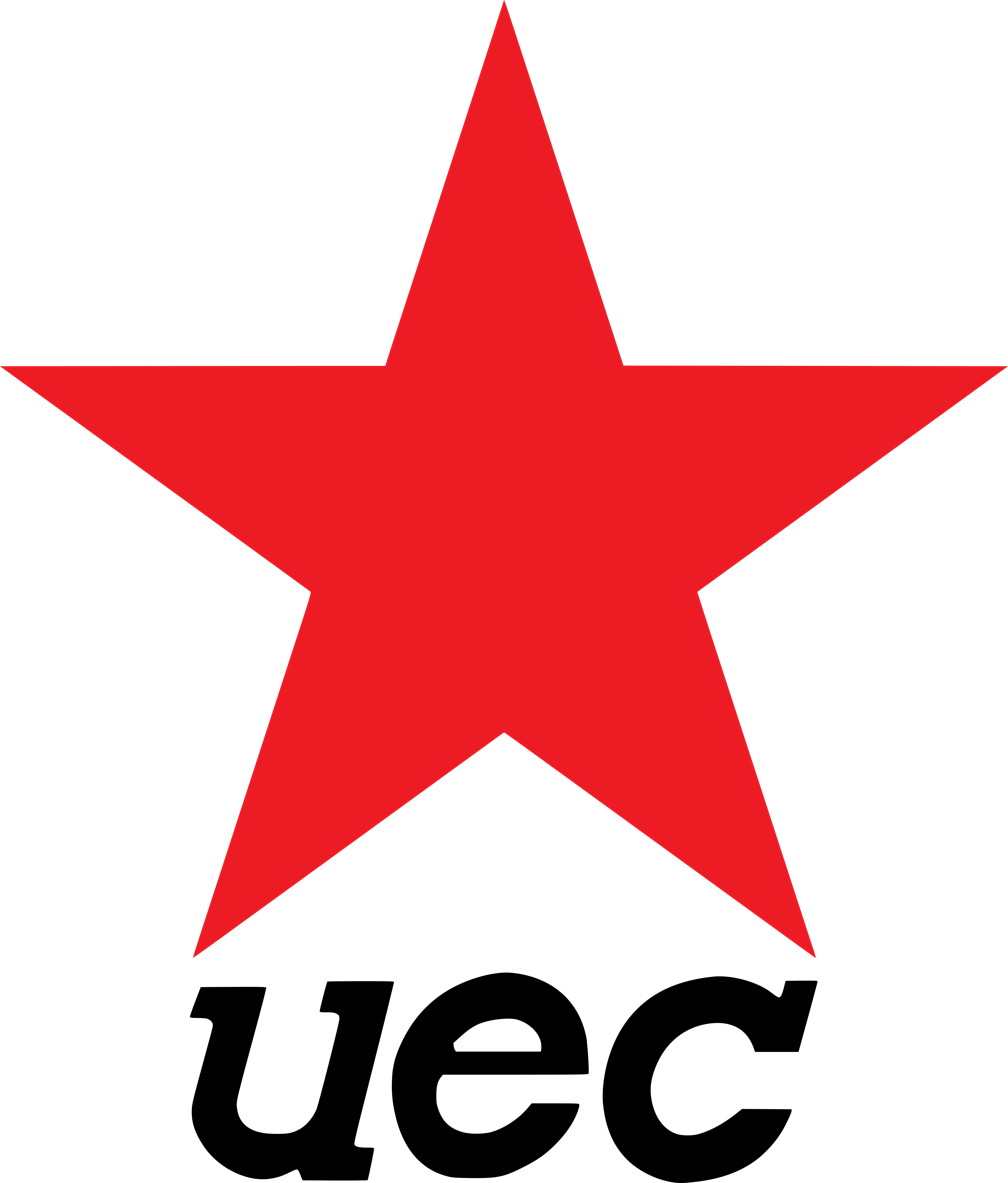
UEC logo

The Communist Students League (Portuguese: União dos Estudantes Comunistas or UEC) was the student wing of the Portuguese Communist Party. UEC was founded in 1972.

On 10 November 1979 UEC merged with the Young Communist League (UJC) to form the Portuguese Communist Youth (JCP).
