= Portuguese Communist Party =

Portuguese Communist Party Partido Comunista Português
- Abbreviation: PCP
- General Secretary: Paulo Raimundo
- Founded: 6 March 1921
- Legalized: 26 December 1974
- Preceded by: Portuguese Maximalist Federation
- Headquarters: Rua Soeiro Pereira Gomes 3, 1600-019 Lisboa
- Newspaper: Avante!; O Militante
- Youth wing: Portuguese Communist Youth
- Membership (2024): ▼47,612
- Ideology: Communism; Marxism–Leninism; Social conservatism; Anti-revisionism; Hard Euroscepticism
- Political position: Far-left
- National affiliation: Unitary Democratic Coalition
- European Parliament group: The Left in the European Parliament
- International affiliation: IMCWP
- Trade union affiliation: General Confederation of the Portuguese Workers
- Colours: Red
- Slogan: "For Freedom, Democracy, and Socialism. The Future has a Party!"
- Anthem: "The Internationale"
- Assembly of the Republic: 3 / 230
- European Parliament: 1 / 21
- Regional Parliaments: 0 / 104
- Local government (Mayors): 12 / 308
- Local government (Parishes): 97 / 3,216

Election symbol
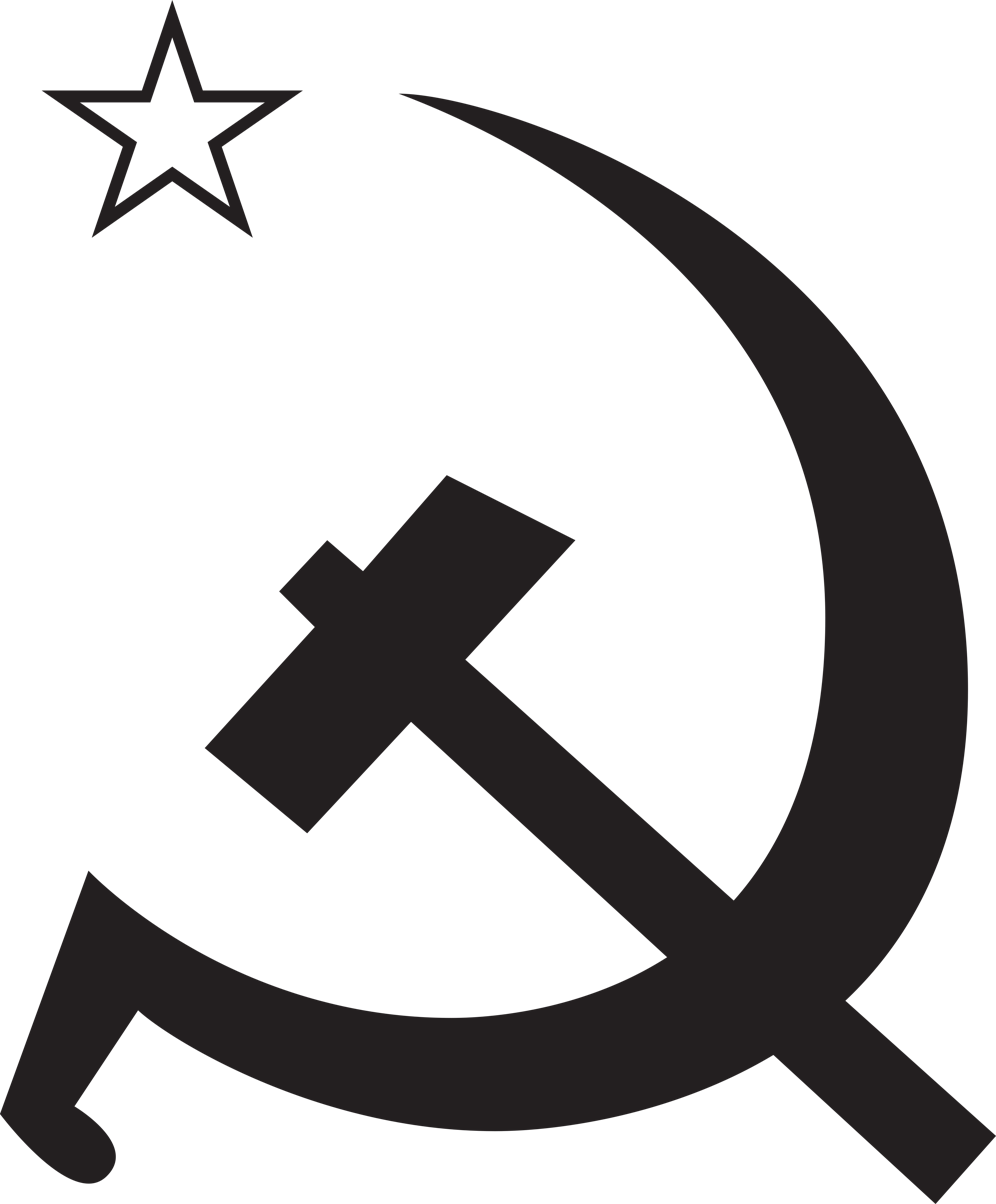

Party flag

Website
- pcp.pt
- Politics of Portugal; Political parties; Elections; A: The party is also described as left-conservative, given its more conservative stances on social issues.

The Portuguese Communist Party (Portuguese: Partido Comunista Português, pronounced [pɐɾˈtiðu kumuˈniʃtɐ puɾtuˈɣeʃ], PCP) is a communist and Marxist–Leninist political party in Portugal. It is one of the strongest communist parties in Western Europe and the oldest Portuguese political party with uninterrupted existence. It is characterized as a far-left party on the political spectrum. Since 1987, it runs to any national, local and European elections in coalition with the Ecologist Party "The Greens" (PEV), assembled in the Unitary Democratic Coalition (CDU).

After the death of its secretary-general, Bento Gonçalves, in the Tarrafal concentration camp, the Party went through a period, from 1942 to 1961, without a secretary-general. In 1961, the historic leader Álvaro Cunhal was elected. In 1992, he was succeeded by Carlos Carvalhas, and in 2004 Jerónimo de Sousa was chosen by the Central Committee to be PCP's Secretary General; Paulo Raimundo was elected in 2022, and currently acts as the party leader.

The PCP was founded in 1921, establishing contacts with the Comintern in 1922 and becoming its Portuguese section in 1923. The PCP was banned after the 1926 military coup and subsequently played a major role in the opposition against the dictatorial regime of António de Oliveira Salazar and Marcelo Caetano. During the nearly five-decade-long dictatorship, the PCP was constantly suppressed by the secret police, which forced the party's members to live in clandestine status under the threat of arrest, torture, and murder. After the Carnation Revolution in 1974, which overthrew the regime, the 36 members of party's Central Committee had, in the aggregate, experienced more than 300 years in jail.

After the end of the dictatorship, the party became a major political force in the new democratic government. One of its goals, according to the party is to maintain its "vanguard role in the service of the class interests of the workers". Currently, the PCP is the joint sixth largest in the Portuguese Assembly of the Republic, where it holds 3 of the 230 assembly seats. It is also represented in the European Parliament, where it is part of the European United Left/Nordic Green Left group.

The party publishes the weekly Avante!, founded in 1931. Its youth organization is the Portuguese Communist Youth, a member of the World Federation of Democratic Youth.

== History ==
=== Party's origins and formation (1919–1926) ===
==== Portuguese Maximalist Federation ====
At the end of World War I, in 1918, Portugal fell into a serious economic crisis, in part due to the Portuguese military intervention in the war. The Portuguese working classes responded to the deterioration in their living standards with a wave of strikes. Supported by an emerging labour movement, the workers achieved some of their objectives, such as an eight-hour working day.

In September 1919, the revolutionary syndicalists of the more radical sectors of the labour movement founded the Portuguese Maximalist Federation. Two years before, the October revolution had occurred, which led to the creation of the Russian Soviet Federative Socialist Republic. The worsening of the living conditions potentiated the amplification and radicalization of the social movement, and in the same year, the General Confederation of Labour was constituted. In this Federation, inspired by the Bolshevik revolution, there were those who did not conform to the impasses and limitations of the traditional trade union action. They sought to follow the example of the Bolshevik revolution, proclaiming through the insurrectional path and working towards its repetition. The designation "maximalist" was chosen because: "After a broad debate the conclusion that Bolshevism meant 'revolution taken to the max' was reached".

The ideological consistent of its leaders was low, inheriting what they had from their syndicalist origins, still far from freeing it to embrace the doctrine and dominating conceptions of Lenin's Party. Despite this, another centre opened in the Portuguese workers' movement, claiming that the syndicalist organization, in itself, was insufficient in a new social order. However, the organization wasn't able to survive the impact of the arrest of their main entertainer, Manuel Ribeiro, at the end of 1920. The articles that he published in the maximalist newspaper "Red Flag" (Bandeira Vermelha), about the governmental behavior in the strike of the railway workers where he ended up arrested, or the "cold dread that the government felt because of the propaganda of the triumphant revolution in Russia", lead to the ban of the Maximalist Federation.

==== Foundation of the Portuguese Communist Party ====
However, after three months the Portuguese Communist Party would be founded, continuing with the group of people that in the disarticulation of the Maximalist Federation demeaned the need of a communist congress. The PCP was founded on the 6 of March 1921. Shortly after the Party's foundation, the Communist Youth was created, that immediately established contact with the Young Communist International.

The third of the provisional organic Basis states that:

The supreme goal that the Portuguese Communist Party will seek to make in a revolutionary action, that the circumstances of the European and national means make timely, is the full socialization of the means of production, circulation and consumption, this means, the radical transformation of capital society into a communist society.

The historian João Madeira considers that in the document remained "a set of confusing and not very clear references, or that collided with the doctrine in which the Soviet experience anchored itself, that had been working since the maximalist experience".

==== Connection to the Communist International and I Congress ====
In 1922, PCP's connection to the Communist International (Comintern) is established, the PCP's Secretary of the National Board, Henrique Caetano de Sousa, was designated by the Party as its delegate for the IV Congress of the Communist International in Moscow, where he would become the only leader in PCP's history to be in the presence of Vladimir Lenin. The militant José Pires Barreira is nominated as PCP's delegate for the III Congress of the Communist Youth International. However, the political divergences and personal rivalries within the Party generated a profound crisis, that lead to the arrival of a Comintern delegate, the Swiss Jules Humbert-Droz, in mid August, 1923. He knew the condition of the Party's creation — outside of any direct influence from the Comintern, and that the Party's model had nothing to do with the Leninist model of democratic centralism.

According to Droz's evaluation, "[the] Party hadn't yet had its constituent congress and didn't have an organic status nor a theoretical and tactical program".

Besides this, what also concerned the "international" was the organic desegregation state found in the Party, polarized in two groups, on one side Henrique Caetano de Sousa and José Pires Barreira, and on the other, José Carlos Rates, that mutually fought. The Congress, meanwhile postponed to November, 1923, had Droz's participation, armed with a Comintern mandate that gave him full powers. Having constituted the Portuguese Section of the Communist International. The Congress elected a new Central Committee (CC), through secret and nominal voting. Out of 71 lists, Carlos Rates was, with 70 votes, the leader more voted in a CC of nine members, becoming the 1st Secretary General of PCP. In these circumstances, it would have to be established if it was possible to not only clarify the Party's political line but also pass to the social and political intervention, unifying a Party with feeble origins and diffuse thoughts, making way for its bolshevization, like the Communist International demanded. The Communist Youth is, in fact, dissolved.

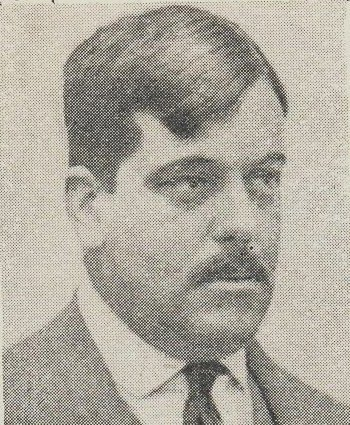
José Carlos Rates, 1st Secretary General of the PCP

Right after the Congress, PCP became very active. In the beginning of the following year, Carlos Rates went to Moscow to participate in the V Congress of the Communist International. Because of his absence, or not, there's an attempt of change of direction in the Party's orientation, starting to focus its propaganda on the danger of a right-wing coup and defending a left front that included the General Confederation of Labour (CGT) and the Democratic Leftwing Republican Party (ED).

==== 1924 manifestation ====
The danger of the right and the coverage of the left front made it that in a big manifestation, in February 1924, they screamed "Down with the reaction!" and "Out with the predominance of living forces!". The communists militants, while telling the press they were standing before the beginning of a proletarian revolution, also stated that it was through their initiative and effort that the protesters that wanted to overtake the parliament were diverted to the headquarters of the newspaper "A Batalha". At the same time that the PCP maintained the version of the imminent revolution, it was also going through many political weaknesses, tactical uncertainties, and profound contradictions, that would end up internally dividing the Party. It was particularly significant that the PCP's representation in the V Congress in the International was ensured by Jules Humbert-Droz, and not by the main leader of the Party, Carlos Rates. The "international" didn't fail to recognize that: "It didn't have illusions about the communist maturity of the Party's direction".

Unlike virtually all other European communist parties, the PCP was not formed after a split of a social democratic or socialist party, but from the ranks of anarcho-syndicalist and revolutionary syndicalist groups, the most active factions in the Portuguese labor movement. The party opened its first headquarters in the Arco do Marquês do Alegrete Street in Lisbon. Seven months after its creation, the first issue of O Comunista (The Communist), the first newspaper of the party, was published.

The congress was attended by about a hundred members of the party and asserted its solidarity with socialism in the Soviet Union and the need for a strong struggle for similar policies in Portugal; it also stated that a fascist coup in Portugal was a serious threat to the party and to the country.

==== 1925 legislative elections ====
For the 1925 legislative elections, PCP proposed an alliance, but it was rejected by the Portuguese Socialist Party, only forming the ED/PCP bloc, where none of the eight PCP candidates, that participated in the respective lists, were elected. In "O Trabalhador Rural", for example, considered that the Party was hidden by its allied, and that the tactic ended up manifesting negatively. It was about the failure of Carlos Rates' direction.

Related or not with this failure and the resulting disappointments, Rates accepts a beneficial proposal by the Union of Economic Interests, a powerful employer central, to be a writer for the newspaper, "O Século". The Party and Comintern found this an unacceptable action with the role he had, and his resignation was demanded. However, he rejected that, being kicked out the Party on the II Congress, in a framework of demoralization and weakening.

==== Establishment of the military dictatorship ====
This Congress started in Lisbon on 29 May 1926, a day after the coup that, beginning in Braga, established the military dictatorship. Despite this, and still conditioned by this event, the congress' works prolonged until the 30th. A motion is approved, identifying it as a fascist movement, and mandating immediately that the delegates that were present contacted the CGT and the Democratic Leftwing, with the goal of proposing an organization as an answer to the coup. However, the answers were met with hesitation and indifference, especially by the CGT, opposing to any alliance with political parties. The Democratic Leftwing opted to support the coup. PCP, weak enough to elaborate any autonomous reaction, ended the congress on 30 May.

=== Party's outlawing and clandestinity (1926–1974) ===
==== Repression and resistance ====
The repression hits the Party in Lisbon, with the break-in of their headquarters, syndicates that it influenced, and the arrest of some leaders, thus causing its disarticulation in the country's capital. Despite the party's activity remaining in some places, like in Porto, the repression that fell upon the February 1927 Revolt is considered demolishing. The break-in and the closing of the regional headquarter led to the dissolving of the north's leadership. The party's activity shrinks, but the channels with the Communist International (CI) remained open, with two Portuguese delegations going to Moscow, one for the 10th anniversary of the February revolution, in 1927, and another for a congress of the Red Trade Union International, in 1928. These delegations included army and navy arsenalists, even though many elements weren't yet part of the Party, like Bento Gonçalves.

==== 1929's "reorganization" ====
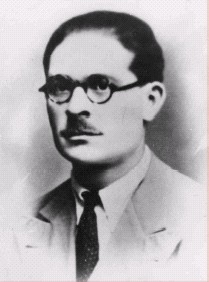
Bento Gonçalves (1929–1942)

In the summer of 1928, when the VI Congress of the CI took place, the PCP was reduced to 50 elements in Lisbon and 20 in Porto. On 21 April 1929, 15 militants gathered in a Conference to proceed to the Party's reorganization. Bento Gonçalves will acknowledge that: "we were few and young".

The new Provisional Central Executive Committee didn't include any of its past elements. It is composed of, among others, by Bento Gonçalves, who will become secretary-general in the first meeting of the new governing body. The April 1929 Conference marked a cut with the previous PCP situation in the organic level, despite the fact that, the ideological changes in the near future will, in the political and ideological point-of-view, be significantly unimpressive. In this phase, "O Proletário" is the main press agency. It is also in this phase that the historian João Madeira considers that Bento reveals himself as "a leader equipped with a strategic sense of action and invested in the doctrinal formulation and consolidation of the party" and that "[he] constituted the most important theoretical production, of Marxist character that PCP had produced". In 1930, the foundations are set for the relaunching of the Federation of the Portuguese Communist Youths. Bento Gonçalves characterized the new regime that was installing itself in Portugal from the Military Dictatorship as fascist. Even though Bento wasn't yet a party official, he was arrested while working in the Navy's Arsenal, in September 1930, being deported without a trial to Cape Verde, where he was jailed for three years.

In the middle of 1931, no element of the Central Executive Committee elected in the April Conference remained free, except José de Sousa, that had immense activity as a union responsible, having also been head of the delegation to the XII Plenum of the Comintern. The Secretariat now consisted of other members.

In the last trimester of 1934, Álvaro Cunhal is recruited by the PCP via the Federation of the Portuguese Communist Youths. There were rapid vertical mobility processes. given the context of the new militants membership in a framework of great repression, having militants, a lot of the time newcomers, being called for intermediate and even superior bodies. In the VII Congress of the Communist International, in 1935, the PCP Secretariat publishes a resolution that seeks to enshrine, once again, the change in political orientation of the PCP, opposing the fascist unit and the construction of the "Popular Front" to the "class versus class" politic of the Comintern, that revealed itself difficult to accomplish. The document also notes the absence of a Socialist Party, critics the anarcho-syndicalists and revolt republicans, persisting, however, in the idea that in those sectors there was an ongoing shift to what could lead to a likely approach to the antifascist front. The VII Congress of the CI had a profound impact in the delegation. Bento Gonçalves send the following note to the leaders in the interior about the transformations that would have to happen in the PCP:

The VII Congress highlighted our lack of work in the organizations of fascist masses and others, our political lines excessively sectarian, our slogans and our very radical campaigns, our delay in the united front and the popular front against the fascist dictatorship.

==== Secretariat's arrest ====
Surprised by the political police, in November 1935, in what was described by the historian João Madeira as a "reckless and incredible street meeting", leads, in a single move, to the arrest of the whole Secretariat. Due to this event in the return of the PCP's delegation, the return of the remaining elements is postponed to March 1936. Bento Gonçalves and Franscisco Oliveira expose the behavior of a member of the delegation that stayed in Moscow until January 1936, that facing the police, had exposed one of the Party's typographies and a clandestine house of the Communist Youth whilst being previously arrested, was kicked out by the International Staff Committee, leaving a "ballast of distrust towards the PCP". The efforts that begun in 1929 were unfeasible for many years, and until the end of the decade the Party never recovered itself, in a political, ideological and organic sense. The leadership is recomposed of second-line militants that compose an appeal Secretariat until the spring of 1936. In April 1936, an extended meeting of the board elected a new Central Committee, having Álvaro Cunhal in it for the first time. However, this turbulence is seen by the Communist International as suspicious.

==== The PCP in the Spanish Civil War ====
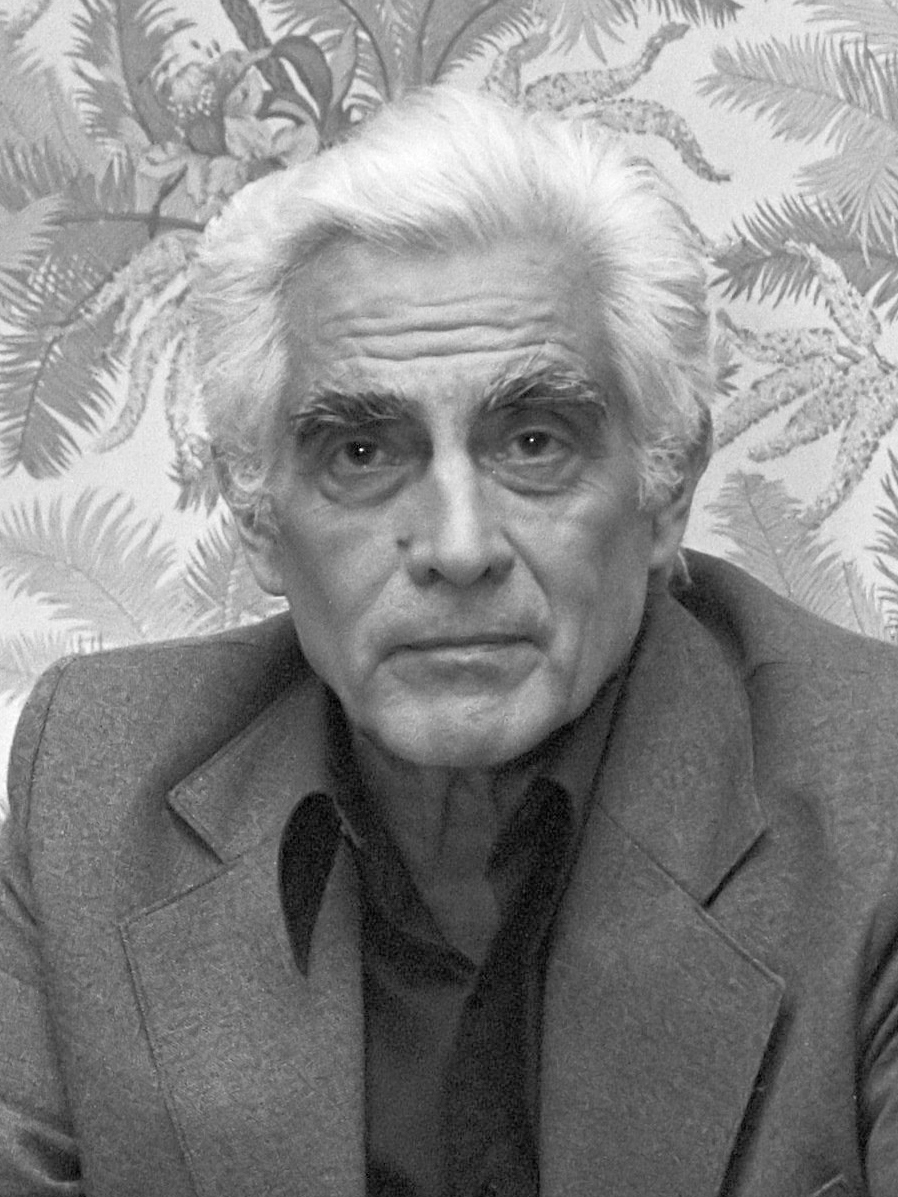
Álvaro Cunhal (1961–1992), its 3rd and longest serving secretary-general.

The PCP's presence in Spain during the Republic and Civil War was due largely to the presence of a high-level Comintern delegation, that ensured the connection between the Central Committee and the Communist Party of Spain, party cadres that featured Victorio Codovilla and Palmiro Togliatti, aspiring the Portuguese representation to a direct connection to the International, with the CPS's intermediation. Militants were sent to Spain to fight on the battlefront for the Republic in the International Brigades, even though that wasn't a central goal of the Party. Nevertheless, it's estimated that there were between 500 and 1200 Portuguese fighters in the republican ranks. Cunhal and Francisco Oliveira arrived in Portugal in January 1937, and Francisco Miguel arrived the following month, all directly from the Soviet Union.

==== Suspension of the Communist International ====
CTG's refusal and the republican's reservations caused difficulties in giving shape to the Popular Front. The difficulties to solve the internal wars were large, and the constant police pressure lead to consecutive raids. Cunhal is arrested in July 1937, Alberto Araújo in November, Francisco de Paula Oliveira and Francisco Miguel in January 1938. The organizational situation and the social influence were weak, and the Popular Front was inactive and disjointed. The situation, scrutinized gruffly by Moscow, lead to the suspicion that the Party could be corrupted by police and agent provocateur, since the rhythm of the party cadres' arrests was very high, and that the efforts to replace them from the outside showed to be ineffective. Francisco de Oliveira (Pável) escaped from Aljube's prison and gets out of the country towards Paris and Moscow. In the Comintern, suspicions grew - suspecting the reasons of the success of Pável's escape from salazarist prisons, and being that, all past students of the Leninist School that had come back in 1938, were all arrested, only one being able to escape prison. The Cadres Section of the International suspended the Party and put them under surveillance, cutting ties with it (but not expelling it), under the pretext that they remain: "in the CP of Portugal an environment, observed by the ECCI in 1936, of corrosive provocation and fractionism of the Party".

==== Beginning of the Second World War ====
Álvaro Cunhal's sentence ends in July 1938, when the internal problems in PCP's leadership are advanced. He continues his studies, and doesn't return immediately to clandestinity, but does not also deprive himself from political activity. In 1939 the Second World War starts, and he receives the task of clarifying the Party's position. The Popular Front's strategy ends, evidenced by an article on the party's newspaper:

The war making more profound the contradictions of capitalism, clearly unmasking the "leaders" of the II International as traitors of the proletariat in service of the bourgeoisie, demonstrating that the communists are the only true defenders of the working class, made it possible in some countries to face the seizing of power by the proletariat as a task to put on the agenda.

However, Cunhal and Carolina Loff, important member of the leading group, were arrested, leaving the PCP weakened in many aspects.

==== The "Reorganization" ====
The concept of "Reorganization" in the PCP, just like in other communist Parties, was based in an idea elaborated by the Comintern in case the Parties were going through problematic situations in terms of leadership, trust, political control and/or that was not up to carrying out "in their country the orientation conjuncturally established by the communist centre". Nevertheless, the suspension meant a "practically total isolation from the international communist device".

===== Tarrafal's Prison Communist Organization and the Amnesty of the Centenarians =====
The Tarrafal's Prison Communist Organization (OCPT), where many important communists met up - mainly all of the Secretariat that was arrested in 1935, in the middle of 1940, upon learning about the "Amnesty of the Centenarians", discuss: "the way we should act in Portugal to reorganize the Party and for us to find ways to contact regularly the Camp's organization".

This amnesty of the Centenarians, "by coinciding with the monumental moment of the regime's propaganda", this is, Portugal's Independence in 1140 and the Restoration of Independence in 1640, released from the Tarrafal concentration camp almost four dozen militants, with these playing an important role in the reorganization, for example, Militão Ribeiro, Pedro Soares, Sérgio Vilarigues ou Américo Gonçalves de Sousa. Alfredo Dinis (pseudonym Alex), militant since 1936, was arrested in 1938 for having connections to the International Red Aid, being released in 1939. Other militants were also released in 1940, like Júlio Fogaça, that belonged to the Secretariat arrested in 1935 and was the most qualified cadre in the party's hierarchy, José Gregório, important communist leader and responsible for the International Red Aid in Portugal, and Manuel Guedes, arrested in Spain in 1936. The first extended meeting of the "reorganizers" was held in December 1940, in Cova da Piedade. Álvaro Cunhal, that probably rejoined the Party still in 1941, said, in 1992, referring to this period, that:

The government declared that the PCP was definitely liquidated and such confidence showed that with the defeat of the USSR in the war, communism would definitely be a lost cause that released from Tarrafal and other prisons in 1940 several Party leaders. In such circumstances, undertaking the reorganization, I think I can say that the PCP showed how the communists understand their duties to the people and to the country...

The first step of the "reorganization" ends with the constitution of the Political Bureau and its Secretariat, coinciding with the re-release of the party's clandestine press - O Militante, since July 1940, and Avante! since August. Re-establishment of contact with the Communist International is tried through the Communist Party USA, intermediated by the writer José Rodrigues Miguéis, being exiled there. The Vila Franca organization, like the Ribatejo one, were one of the zones where the "reorganized" PCP instituted itself. According to the Ribatejo region responsible, António Dias Lourenço, "[...] we had an active life, organized in regional terms". Pedro dos Santos Soares was the delegate of the "reorganizers" in Braga.

In the war situation, they are approached by the Secret Intelligence Service to report lists of names of pro-Nazis.

==== Financing problems ====
The conjuncture and the scarce financial means made the situation more difficult. And so, they resorted to "not well clarified" ways to obtain funds, especially through the involvement of wolfram businesses. Militão Ribeiro, when in prison in 1942, declared that he negotiated wolfram during a year, after coming back from Tarrafal, because he wanted to buy a new car, thus evading confirming his role as a leader of the "reorganization". José Pedro Soares, that came back from Tarrafal in July 1940, was also involved in the wolfram business. A worker from Sacavém proposed fabricating fake notes, but this proposition was rejected by the leadership because, "in case it is detected, it can be discreditable, because the masses would not understand".

==== 1942 arrests ====
In 1942, Pedro Soares, Pires Jorge, Júlio Fogaça and other important cadres are arrested, due to the lack of financial means, that lead to the absence of necessary security conditions on the premises that they used. With the arrest of Militão Ribeiro, only one of the three elements of the Secretariat of the Political Bureau remains in clandestinity. And so, important changes happened inside the Party's leadership, leading to the rise of Álvaro Cunhal to the Secretariat, body that "will quickly acquire indisputable political authority", with José Gregório. The growth of the Party's influence, even though limited, and the admission of new militants, lead to a significant growth of funds. Pedro Soares, when returning to Tarrafal resumes his studies and participates in the "important student movement against the increase of tuition fees". Cândida Ventura, already a PCP militant, says she participated "in the leadership of big college students manifestations against the increase of tuition fees that originated strikes and rallies in each Colleges and parades through the streets of Lisbon". Armando Bacelar, a Law finalist, said that at that time the manifestation was "the only linking element in the PCP organization between the student sector and the working sector". The Party's goal at that time was to extend the party ranks. José Augusto da Silva Martins, that had a "fundamental role in the academic environment", leaves Coimbra to take care of the "reorganization" in Porto. Due to the war situation, there is a deterioration of the living conditions of the popular layers, leading to a "reawakening of social agitation", that translates in a cycle of strikes between 1942 and 1944 and in the rural movements of 1943-45. The Party, whose influence is absent in these spontaneous movimentations, speaks out in the paradigm of agitation and propaganda through flyers and Avante!.

==== 1942 strikes ====
In a conjuncture that originated the system of rationing, there was a deterioration of salaries that were already low, and other clearly unpopular measures, like the overtime pay of just 50%. After being alerted, Salazar refuses any role of syndicalism activity of the corporate syndicates. But the strikes erupt in Lisbon, spontaneously initiating in Carris, and subsequently in Telephones, continuing to have industrial and factory workers, who were fundamental, join. According to the National Institute of Work and Pensions of the Estado Novo, there where 14 thousand striking workers. Even though a lot of communist militants participated, in the report that José Gregório (Pseudonym Alberto) presents to the III Congress, he acknowledges that:

(...) the leadership of our Party, even though it led the workers in their daily fight to the point of outbreak of the movement, did not realize in time the maturing of the conditions that facilitated the triggering of the strike and did not perform in it its true leadership role.

However, the movement grows exponentially, causing a wave of enthusiasm within the Party. The Secretary of the Political Bureau, Militão Ribeiro, shortly before being arrested, puts the slogan "general strike" in a manifest that he writes at the end of 1942. The government's lack of capability in containing the worsening of the people's living conditions lead the PCP to discuss how to organize new strikes, its size and character.

==== 1943 strikes ====
The 1943 strikes, unlike the previous ones, will be organized and led by the Party, not giving them, however, a general strike character, due to the analysis of the party and the masses conditions by the Party's Leadership. When considering the conditions as met to advance in the industrialized areas, Lisbon, Almada, Barreiro and Ribatejo, the Secretariat proclaimed that:

To oppose to the brutal force with which fascism forces the workers to hunger and misery, the only thing that is left for the workers to respond with is the masses strength. It is necessary to resort to superior ways to fight. It is necessary to suspend the work! It is necessary to go to the strike! It is necessary to do hunger marches! It is necessary to raid all the places where the goods are hoarded! It is necessary to take the goods wherever they are!

On 26 July the first strikes take place, in the cork producers of Almada. When the GNR intervenes, there's already 3 500 strikers. The next day, workers from other sectors join the strike, with the strike having well over ten thousand people. To agitate the sectors, the Communist Party publishes a second manifest in this day, looking to also amplifying them:

A retreat or forfeit, would put the working masses in the mercy of the patronage, it would represent to the future a redoubled exploration and a triggering of a permanent terror over the working masses. The Unity and the Fight are the victory conditions. It is necessary to continue to spread the movement.

Two days after, the PCP talks about 50 thousand strikers. In Barreiro, a state of emergency was declared and in Lisbon the stations entered prevention mode. In the manifest of the CC's Secretariat in this day, a general increase in wages and the expansion of the strike throughout the national territory are requested. However, in the last days of the month, the repression takes on a large scale, with a high number of arrests, compulsive firings, and military mobilization. On 4 August, given the repression proportions, the Party advises the return to the jobs, in what José Gregório calls "organized retreating". According to a report by PIDE-DGS, the PCP emerged before the worker as a leading political force, thus giving place to the consolidation of the "reorganization".

==== Creation of the Movement of National Antifascist Unity ====
Shortly before the strikes, still in 1943, the Communist Party proposed the creation of the MUNAF platform, Movement of National Antifascist Unity, to the remaining opposition political forces, given the conjuncture of the Second World War, that favored the Allies. This idea of an Antifascist Nacional Front was also supported by the Communist International. In O Militante!, the need to organize the resistance against the support of Salazar to the Axis powers is recognized:

Down with the ill-intended that preach the neutrality at all costs to, more easily aid the fascist powers! Let's enlighten the well-intentioned that the salazarist neutrality is nothing more than a mystification to favor the "Axis"! Let's continue the Victory Army for union of all the people crushed by fascism! Let's unite our resistance to the aid provided by Salazar to the "Axis" fascists, and their war maneuvers! Long live the union of all anti-fascists!

MUNAF's goal was, fundamentally, to overthrow Salazar, replace him for a National Unity government that would take measures against the "Axis", liquidate its institutions like the Legião Portuguesa and the National Union, liquidate its corporate institutions, extinguish Tarrafal and release the political prisoners. It also had the goal to implement a wage policy according to the cost of living, a democratic land reform, and the call for elections for a Constituent Assembly. In December 1943, it is formally constituted. Fernando Piteira Santos was the PCP member that took part in the composition of its Central Committee.

==== National and international relations ====
The Party was aware and studied its positions in the International and Soviet Communist Movement, despise its international war situation and channel cuts, through Radio Moscow, that according to Cunhal "frequently clarifies the international life events, that, in another way, would be late to be clarified". The only formal contacts with the international movement were just in the coverage and logistic support sense to the leaders of the Communist Party of Spain exhiled in Latin America to Spain. Santiago Carrillo, that organized these exchanges, complimented the PCP: "We really needed the help of the Portuguese. Later I went to Portugal. The Portuguese comrades always behaved with extraordinary loyalty and great sense of solidarity". This support by the PCP, especially when it came to clandestine housing and transport means, allowed the reconstitution of the PCE. Despite this, there is a dissolution of the Communist International in 1943 without the re-establishment of their ties with the PCP. In the same year, the III Congress, or the I Illegal Congress of the Party, ends with the essential of the "reorganization" process. The new numbering constituted a symbolic importance to the Party, since it was about a new party, "reorganized", quoting with the previous period to Bento Gonçalves' "reorganization". This congress, that defined the tactical and strategical, political and ideological line of the PCP, took place within the framework of the "hot experience" of workers' strikes, in what came out of the VII Congress of the Communist International, and the adoption of orientations spread by the USSR. The strikes "represented the reopening of an offensive cycle of the workers' movement", in which the PCP had an important leading role. The strikes also helped to mold the "united front of the working class" to the concrete conditions of the Portuguese reality, that differentiated fundamentally from those of other countries by not having other expressive resistance parties. The efforts for the MUNAF creation intensified in the spring of 1943, with the German defeat in Stalingrad, just like other communist parties in western Europe with its respective new anti-fascist fronts. The PCP was hegemonic in the front due to the weakness in an organic level of other Parties. The front based itself on the idea that Salazar represented the treason, and that the MUNAF should represent the patriotic and freedom sentiments that were rooted in the nation's forces. The Party advocated for the insurrectional overthrow of fascism, created through the fight of the masses. Cunhal clarifies, also in his report, that this movement of masses would provoke the membership of Armed Forces sectors and police devices.

==== The PCP and the Second World War ====
After the favorable conjucture to the antifascist movements, nationally and intertionally, the growth of the party and the start of the Movement of National Antifascist Unity, lead to the idea that the dictatorship had its days counted. According to Avante!, in December 1943, a new working offensive was underway since autumn. The course of the war, heard attentively through the Radio Moscow's broadcasts, unveiled the defeat of Nazi Germany and Nazifascism. This raised the question of knowing whether or not if Salazar's dictatorship would survive or not. The PCP's position in this matter is that the defeat of fascism in Europe would lead the initiative of popular actions that would end up overthrowing the dictatorship, and that a foreign liberation wouldn't come. In December 1943, in Sintra, the MUNAF's constitution is institutionalized. It was the PCP's responsibility to share the statement that had its first objective:

Prepare and carry out the current government's suppression and, in its place, establish a Democratic National Government in which every current of antifascist opposition is represented and that gives the Portuguese People the possibility to choose in truly free elections its leaders"

In 1944, the PCP had as its burning goal the Salazar overthrow, something that seemed close. This seemed to insist in two types of fundamentals of its political action - the MUNAF's amplification and the triggering of another striker movement of the same or superior range of the ones in July/August 1943. In March/April 1944, the bread started being rationed. Alfredo Dinis, communist leader that controls the important region of Lisbon, clearly perceives the "large and alive discontent in the working and popular environments", informing immediately the Central Committee's Secretariat. Other working party sectors were ready to advance, only waiting for the Party's instructions. The strike's date is set late, 8/9 May by the Secretariat, with a similar scheme as the previous ones. However, the attendance fell short of what the Party expected, not exceeding half of those who got involved the previous summer, leading to the necessity of a more in depth evaluation of the striker's movement, that will happen in a plenary meeting of the Central Committee on the 30th of that month. In a discussion, based by the report presented by Alfredo Dinis, it is concluded that it was a "victory with failure" in some aspects, pointing as the fundamental cause of the movement's performance the organization.

In July 1944, the MUNAF's emergency program is approved, coinciding with the beginning of the Nazifascism's defeat, with the battle of Normandy and the soviet offensive of the European East. The idea that Salazar would be swept by the Nazi's defeat was intense. The PCP's Military Committee was formed, Fernando Piteira Santos was responsible for it, also featuring José Magro e Francisco Ramos da Costa. And so, they looked to increase the MUNAF's and the Party's influence in the Armed Forces, and to weaker its repressive capacity through the soldiers that, in case there was a national uprising, would start being on the people's side. The MUNAF's body in the army and navy published the newspaper "A Voz do Soldado".

=== Party in the current democracy (1974–present) ===
==== Carnation Revolution ====
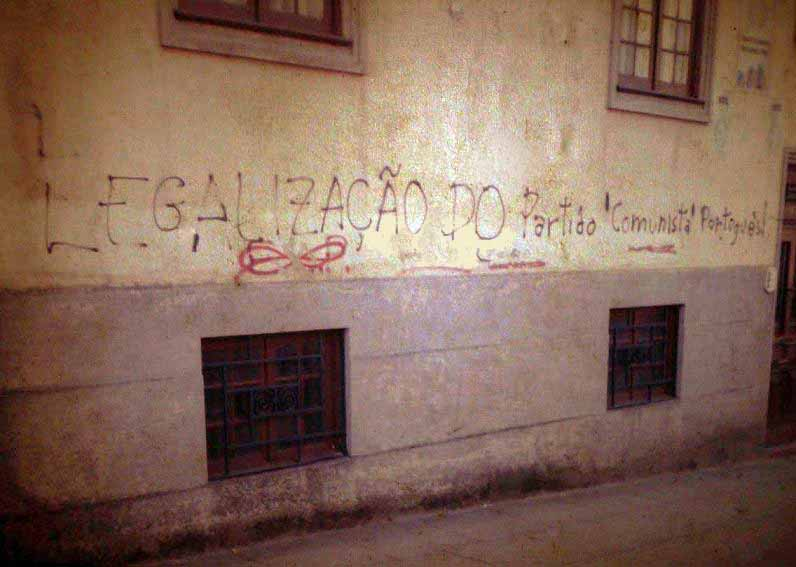
"Legalização do Partido Comunista Português" (transl. Legalization of the Portuguese Communist Party) (1974)

Immediately after the revolution, basic democratic rights were re-established in Portugal. On 27 April, political prisoners were freed. On 30 April, Álvaro Cunhal returned to Lisbon, where he was received by thousands of people. May Day was commemorated for the first time in 48 years, and an estimated half million people gathered in the FNAT Stadium (now 1 May Stadium) in Lisbon to hear speeches by Cunhal and the socialist Mário Soares. On 17 May, the party's newspaper, Avante!, produced the first legal issue in its history.

The following months were marked by radical changes in the country, always closely followed and supported by PCP. A stormy process to give independence to the colonies started with the full support of the party and, within a year, Guinea-Bissau, Angola, Mozambique, Cape Verde, and São Tomé and Príncipe became independent countries.

Six months after the Carnation Revolution, on 20 October 1974, the party's seventh congress took place. More than a thousand delegates and hundreds of Portuguese and foreign guests attended. The congress set forth important statements that discussed the ongoing revolution in the country. The 36 members of the elected central committee had in the aggregate experienced more than 300 years in jail. On 26 December 1974, the PCP became the first legally recognized party.

The revolutionary process continued. On 11 March 1975, the left-wing military forces defeated a coup attempt by rightists in the military. This resulted in a turn in the revolutionary process to the political left, with the main sectors of the economy, such as the banks, transportation, steel mills, mines, and communications companies, being nationalized. This was done under the lead of Vasco Gonçalves, a member of the military wing who supported the party and who had become prime minister after the first provisional government resigned. The party then asserted its complete support for these changes and for the Agrarian Reform process that implemented collectivization of the agricultural sector and the land in a region named the "Zone of Intervention of the Agrarian Reform" or "ZIRA", which included the land south of the Tagus River. The PCP took the lead of that process and drove it according to the party's program, organizing thousands of peasants into cooperatives. Combined with the party's strong clandestine organization and support of the peasants' movement during the preceding years in that region, these efforts made the south of Portugal the major stronghold of the PCP. The party gained more than half of the votes in Beja, Évora, and Setúbal in subsequent elections.

In the spring of 1975, as rumors of a communist takeover spread, relations between the communists and the moderate socialists deteriorated. Non-communist parties and the military attempted to exclude the PCP from government. The United States, several West European governments and political parties supported the Portuguese socialists against the PCP, which was supported by the Soviet Union although its focus shifted to Angola and other Portuguese colonies in Africa.

One year after the revolution, the first democratic elections took place to elect the parliament that would write a new constitution to replace the constitution of 1933. The party achieved 12.52% of the vote and elected 30 members of parliament. In the end, as the party wanted, the constitution included several references to "socialism" and a "classless society" and was approved with the opposition of only one party, the right-wing Democratic and Social Centre (Portuguese: Centro Democrático Social or CDS).

In 1976, after the approval of the constitution, the second democratic election was carried out and the PCP raised its share of the vote to 14.56% and 40 seats. In the same year, the first Avante! Festival took place, and the eighth congress was held in Lisbon from 11–14 November. The congress mainly stated the need to continue the quest for socialism in Portugal and the need to defend the achievements of the revolution against what the party considered to be a political step backward, led by a coalition of the Socialist Party and the right-wing Centro Democrático Social, who opposed the agrarian reform process.

In 1979, the party held its ninth congress, which analysed the state of post-revolutionary Portugal, right-wing politics, and the party's struggles to nationalize the economy. In December 1979, new elections took place. The party formed the United People Alliance (Portuguese: Aliança Povo Unido or APU) in coalition with the Portuguese Democratic Movement (Portuguese: Movimento Democrático Português or MDP/CDE) and increased its vote to 18.96% and 47 seats. The election was won by a centrist/right-wing coalition led by Francisco Sá Carneiro, which immediately initiated policies that the party considered to be contrary to working-class interests. Despite a setback in a subsequent election in 1980, in which the PCP dropped to 41 seats, the party achieved several victories in local elections, winning the leadership of dozens of municipalities in the FEPU coalition. After the sudden death of Sá Carneiro in an air crash in 1980, the party achieved 44 seats and 18.20% of the vote as part of the APU in the 1983 elections. Also in 1983, the party held its tenth congress, which again criticized what it saw as the dangers of right-wing politics.

In 1986, the surprising rise of Mário Soares, who reached the second round in the presidential election, defeating the party's candidate, Salgado Zenha, made the party call an extra congress. The eleventh congress was called with only two weeks' notice, in order to decide whether or not to support Soares against Freitas do Amaral. Soares was supported, and he won by a slight margin. Had he not been supported by the PCP, he would have probably lost. In 1987, after the resignation of the government, another election took place. The PCP, now in the Unitary Democratic Coalition (Portuguese: Coligação Democrática Unitária or CDU) with the Ecologist Party "The Greens" (Portuguese: Partido Ecologista "Os Verdes" or PEV) and the Democratic Intervention (Portuguese: Intervenção Democrática or ID), saw an electoral decline to 12.18% and 31 seats.

==== Fall of the Socialist Bloc ====
In 1988, the PCP held another congress, the twelfth, in which more than 2000 delegates participated and which put forth a new program entitled Portugal, an Advanced Democracy for the 21st Century.

At the end of the 1980s, the Socialist Bloc of Eastern Europe started to disintegrate, and the party faced one of the biggest crises in its history. With many members leaving, the party called a thirteenth congress for May 1990, in which a huge ideological battle occurred. The majority of the more than 2000 delegates decided to continue the party's "revolutionary way to Socialism" — i. e., to retain its Leninist ideology. By so doing, it clashed with what many other communist parties around the world were doing. The congress asserted that socialism in the Soviet Union had failed, but a unique historical experience, several social changes, and several achievements by the labour movement had been influenced by the Socialist Bloc. Álvaro Cunhal was re-elected secretary-general, but Carlos Carvalhas was elected assistant secretary-general.

In the legislative election of 1991, the party won 8.84% of the national vote and 17 seats, continuing its electoral decline.

The fourteenth congress took place in 1992, and Carlos Carvalhas was elected the new secretary-general, replacing Álvaro Cunhal. The congress analysed the new international situation created by the disappearance of the Soviet Union and the defeat of socialism in Eastern Europe. The party also traced the guidelines intended to put Cavaco Silva and the right-wing government on its way out, a fact that would happen shortly after. In 1995, the right-wing Social Democratic Party was replaced in the government by the Socialist Party after the October legislative election, in which the PCP received 8.61% of the votes.

The logo of the PCP used until 2016

In December 1996, the fifteenth congress was held, this time in Porto, with more than 1600 delegates participating. The congress criticized the right-wing policies of the socialist government of António Guterres, and debated the future of the PCP following the debacle of the Socialist Bloc. In the subsequent local elections, the party continued to decline, but in the legislative election of 1999, the party increased its voting percentage for the first time in many years. The sixteenth congress was held in December 2000, and Carlos Carvalhas was re-elected secretary-general. In the legislative election of 2002, the PCP achieved its lowest voting result ever, with only 7.0% of the vote.

In November 2004, the seventeenth party congress elected Jerónimo de Sousa, a former metal worker, as the new secretary-general.

In the legislative election of February 2005, the Party increased its share of the vote, and won 12 of the 230 seats in parliament, receiving about 430,000 votes (7.60%).

After the 2005 local election, in which the PCP regained the presidency of 7 municipalities, the party holds the leadership of 32 (of 308) municipalities, most of them in Alentejo and Setúbal, and holds the leadership of hundreds of civil parishes and local assemblies. The local administration by PCP is usually marked by concern about such issues as preventing privatization of the water supply, funding culture and education, providing access to sports, and promoting health, facilitating participatory democracy, and preventing corruption. The presence of the Greens in the coalition also keeps an eye on environmental issues such as recycling and water treatment.

The PCP's work now follows the program of an "Advanced Democracy for the 21st Century". Issues like the decriminalization of abortion, workers' rights, the increasing fees for the health service and education, the erosion of the social safety net, low salaries and pensions, imperialism and war, and solidarity with other countries such as Iraq, Afghanistan, Palestine, Cuba, and the Basque Country are constant concerns in the party's agenda.

The party has three members elected to the European Parliament, after the European election of 2014. They sit in the European United Left–Nordic Green Left group.

Since the 2015 legislative election, the party supports the government headed by António Costa, together with the Left Bloc and the Greens. However, the PCP has been historically critical of the Socialist Party.

In 2017, the party, alongside the Portuguese Socialist Party, the social-democratic PSD, BE and the ecologist party PEV, voted in favour of abolishing party fundraising limits, thereby opening all Portuguese parties to private political donorship, with no obligation to disclose the donations source. The new proposal was reluctantly approved by the Portuguese president Marcelo Rebelo de Sousa.

After the 2019 European Parliament election in Portugal the party lost one MEP, and in 2024 lost another one. The PCP currently has one MEP, sitting European United Left-Nordic Green Left group in the European Parliament.

==== Reaction to the 2022 invasion of Ukraine ====
Since the beginning of the 2022 Russian invasion of Ukraine, the PCP has come under the spotlight for being the sole political party represented in Parliament to have avoided a clear condemnation of Russia from the start, choosing instead to repeatedly blame the United States, the European Union, and NATO for the war.

On 24 February (the first day of the invasion), the party refused to condemn Russia, upon being explicitly invited to do so by Foreign Affairs Minister Augusto Santos Silva (Socialist Party) in a parliamentary debate. The communists stated that the conflict was "more profound" than "a problem between Russians and Ukrainians", and instead blamed the United States, accusing them of being "the party that is truly interested in having a new war in Europe" and of "promoting" it in order to "turn attentions away from internal problems" and to "ensure a large-scale sale of weapons".

On 1 March, the two Communist Party members of the European Parliament voted against a resolution condemning the invasion. The party said the resolution was "fuelling the escalation", "seeking to impose a unilateral view" and "justifying the colossal process of increasing military expenditures, the strengthening and expansion of NATO and the militarisation of the EU". The document was approved with more than 600 votes in favour, 13 against and 26 abstentions.

On 8 March, the PCP's leader Jerónimo de Sousa blamed all entities involved in the war (Russia included, although referring to its actions by the Kremlin's language of a "military operation"). He stated the party condemned "the whole process of meddling and of confrontation which took place [in Ukraine], the US-promoted coup d'état in 2014, Russia's recent military intervention and the intensification of the bellicose escalation made by the US, NATO and the EU".

On 20 April, the PCP announced that it would not attend the Parliament's solemn session where President of Ukraine Volodymyr Zelenskyy would speak, the following day. The party's parliamentary leader Paula Santos rejected condoning "the participation of someone who personifies a xenophobic and bellicose power", calling the session a "stage to contribute for the escalation of war".

On 23 April, questioned by a journalist as to whether he considered that there was an invasion going on, party leader Jerónimo de Sousa replied: "There was a military operation which we have condemned." Following the journalist's insistence on the question, he rejected using the word 'invasion' and instead hesitantly responded: "At least, from the images we have... from the images we have, there is a conflict, there is a war. That is unavoidable and must be recognised." The word 'invasion' would later be used officially by new secretary-general Paulo Raimundo in November 2022, following similar statements from fellow MPs.

==== Decline in the 2020s ====
At the 2022 legislative election, the party suffered its worst defeat ever, returning just six MPs, the first time the party finished with fewer than ten seats. The party was further reduced to four seats at the 2024 legislative election, and three at the 2025 legislative election.

== Ideology and principles ==
The PCP considers itself the vanguard of the Portuguese proletariat. It supports Marxism–Leninism and proletarian internationalism. Unlike its counterparts in Spain, France and Italy, the PCP resisted reformist trends and rejected Eurocommunism. The party is considered to be one of the most orthodox communist parties in Western Europe. The PCP calls for ‘the dissolution of European economic and monetary union’, large-scale renationalisation of strategic economic sector including banks and utilities and the renegotiation of public debt. One of the critical issues for the PCP is welfare state - the party presents itself as the guardian of the "April values", stating that one of the promises of the Carnation Revolution was a thriving welfare state, which did not materialize.

Its discourse is described as 'strongly nationalistic' given its absolute opposition to the EU and globalization. The party is supportive of the Soviet Union and upholds its legacy while rejecting liberal democracy. It supported the unsuccessful August Coup and attributes the collapse of the USSR to Gorbachev, arguing that his policies such as perestroika had betrayed socialism. The PCP proposes "advanced democracy" as an "embyronic socialist stage" and an alternative to liberal democracy, which would include political freedoms such as rights to expression and vote, democratic elections and "participatory and direct democracy"; notable characteristics of liberal democracy such as multi-party politics are excluded. At the same time, the PCP removed all mentions of "dictatorship of the proletariat" from its documents and programs, and became the first communist party in Western Europe to do so; regarding this decision, the party stated:

The dictatorship of the proletariat is a regime more democratic than the most democratic of bourgeois democracies. However, the expression dictatorship used now in Portugal after fifty years of a fascist dictatorship, in the very particular situation that we are going through, does not facilitate the comprehension of the policy of the Party, nor aid in the realization of its objectives.

Alongside upholding its "proletarian vanguard role", its official goals are:

- to bring about the process of social transformation and the defeat of capitalism through revolutionary means,
- to uphold dialectical and historical materialism as an "instrument of analysis and guide for action",
- the rupture with right-wing policies,
- the realization of a patriotic and left-wing alternative,
- the realization of an "Advanced Democracy" with the values of the April revolution, for a future socialist and communist Portugal.

=== Social issues ===
The party has been described as socially conservative. It is considered a 'conservative communist' party as it one of "the most conservative and least connected to post-materialist values" radical left parties. In the GAL-TAN (Green/Alternative/Libertarian vs Traditionalist/Authoritarian/Nationalist) dimension, used to measure stances on sociocultural issues, the party's ideology shows "a radical move towards the TAN axis". The PCP is also described as left-conservative in the sense of being a conservative party on the social conservative-libertarian division. Portuguese journalist Alexandra Lucas Coelho argues that "in many ways, before being left-wing, the PCP is conservative." The PCP-led Unitary Democratic Coalition is also considered socially conservative, and left-conservative. Portuguese political scientists José Pedro Lopes and Alena Vieira argue that since the 2010s, PCP had undergone a "shift to the right on the GAL-TAN scale" and put strong emphasis on issues like 'defending national sovereignty'. Analyzing the Chapel Hill Expert Survey, political scientist Isaac del Río Sánchez classifies the PCP as "left-authoritarian and not left-libertarian", noting stances "usually associated with conservative parties on social issues."

Political alignment of Portuguese political parties on a two-dimensional spectrum from the British Journal of Political Science. The Portuguese Communist Party is coded as PCP, and is placed in the left-conservative space.

The party abstained on votes regarding LGBT issues such as adoption rights for same-sex couples and the condemnation of LGBT persecution in Chechnya. It did vote in favor of adoption for same-sex couples in 2015, but only as a gesture to "unite the left" when it was certain that the proposal had insufficient support to pass regardless of PCP's vote. The party was criticized for expelling homosexual couples from its Avante! Festival, with party guards warning that "there are no faggot comrades" (Portuguese: não há camaradas maricas). In 2023, together with all left and right-wing Portuguese parties in the parliament except for the far-right Chega, PCP supported a law "to protect the human rights of transgender and homosexual people" and ban forced sexual orientation conversion.

The party's combination of cultural conservatism and economically far-left positions puts it in the 'left-conservative' ideological dimension, representing a break from the otherwise one-dimensional nature of Portuguese politics, as all other parties run along left-progressive (economically left-wing and culturally progressive) and right-conservative (economically right-wing and culturally conservative) lines. The PCP criticizes progressive movements as easily controlled by imperialist states and for embracing reformism instead of addressing the core issues of capitalism; the party considers the issues of sexual inequalities, animal rights and environmentalism to be distractions and substitutes to class struggle. Nevertheless, it finds cooperation with green and anti-globalization movements permissible as long as it "provides fruitful ground for promoting socialism". The party is considered to largely dismiss issues social such as "reproductive rights and cohabitation laws"; it argues that issues such as women and LGBT rights carry little political relevance.

Political scientist Jacopo Custodi also noted the party's subdued rhetoric towards far-right Chega; the PCP is critical of the tendency to center the political debate on the alleged threat of neo-fascism or polarizing Portuguese politics along the far-right and anti-far-right lines, calling it "a manifest exaggeration". Chega representatives praised the PCP for having "a firm and well-founded position" on many social issues. Along with CDS, the PCP was the only party to oppose euthanasia, writing that "enshrining in law the right to kill or to kill oneself is not a sign of progress but a step towards civilizational regression." According to Expresso, the party and its youth wing, the Portuguese Communist Youth, also established rapprochement with the Catholic Church, which led some supporters to accuse the party of further conservatism.

=== Foreign policy ===
The party has been described as 'Russia-friendly', "anti-Western" and hard Eurosceptic. It argues that NATO and the West are to blame for the Russo-Ukrainian War, and did not condemn Russian actions. Commenting on the war, the PCP declared:

[Ukraine is] the same problem we've seen in Yugoslavia, Iraq, Afghanistan, Libya, and Syria. The problem is the use of siege tactics, confrontation, and war to impose economic relations that engender injustice, inequality, and appropriation [prescribing] an end to escalating political, economic, and military confrontation by NATO, the USA, and the EU towards Russia and relying on its contribution towards a negotiated political, peaceful, resolution.

The party voted against the resolution condemning the Russian invasion in the European Parliament. It argued that the war in Ukraine was caused by "the strategy of tension" employed by the West against Russia, and presented a dossier with several ‘facts and numbers’ comparing the military spending of the West to Russia along with the 'chronology' of NATO expansion in Central and Eastern Europe. The PCP denounces Euromaidan as a 'fascist coup' that was financed by Western powers and led to the establishment of a "xenophobic and bellicose" regime in Ukraine; it also condemns Ukraine as fascist and accuses it of anti-Russian and anti-communist policies. The PCP opposes sanctions against Russia and objects to military aid to Ukraine, arguing that sanctions are a policy of 'exploitation and oppression' imposed on countries for refusing to "submit to the dictate of imperialism"; the party also stated that only the arms industry profits from sending weapons to Ukraine while penalizing "workers and peoples".

It supports Nicolás Maduro, and after the 2024 Venezuelan presidential election, it wrote: "The PCP salutes the election of Nicolás Maduro as President of the Bolivarian Republic of Venezuela, as well as all the progressive, democratic and patriotic Venezuelan forces that have achieved another important victory with this election, defeating the reactionary, anti-democratic and national abdication project." The party also "expresses its unwavering solidarity with Cuba, the Cuban people, its Government and its Revolution, which are the target of an unacceptable and criminal policy of interference, destabilisation and blockade by North American imperialism". The PCP supports the Democratic People's Republic of Korea, calling for its defence against 'Western imperialism' and participating in several working visits to the country. The party also expressed its support of the People's Republic of China, writing that "the PRC objectively represents a hopeful factor of stability, peace and social progress." In regards to the Chinese economic model, the party wrote:

We are also aware there are no «models» of revolution; that building socialism, obeying general laws, involves specificities in each country; that, as practice has demonstrated, building a new society without exploiters and exploited is a more complex and lengthy process than expected. Therefore we look upon the path of the PRC not as «teachers of the revolution», but as revolutionaries committed to the liberating cause of workers worldwide, ready to learn from the lessons of experience, towards adjusting our intervention in our own country. And wishing the Chinese communists, workers and people the greatest success in achieving the noble patriotic and socialist ideals of their liberating revolution.

The PCP denounces the EU "as imperialist, exploitative, and undemocratic". It argues that the EU is and will forever be dominated by France and Germany, and is based on "continued imposition of neoliberal policies" and "loss of sovereignty by member nations". The PCP praised Brexit and endorsed "the British people's decision to leave the EU"; however, the party also warns that after Brexit the EU has become more aggressive in pursuing "capitalist integration with neo-liberalism, militarism, and federalism by increasingly shifting power away from nations to EU institutions dominated by large powers such as Germany (within the EU) and the USA". The party argues that this aggressive shift is obscured by claims that the EU tries to protect itself against the extreme right, along with narratives revolving "European citizenship" and "European values". The PCP also argues that the EU cannot unite Europe against the competition capitalist camps as European integration failed to resolve conflicting interests between the bourgeoisie of the member states; weaker states such as Portugal are unable to benefit from this. It declares that EU must be dissolved as it led to "economic crisis, social regression, weakened democracy, and militarism; all inevitable results of the imperialist struggle."

=== Patriotism ===
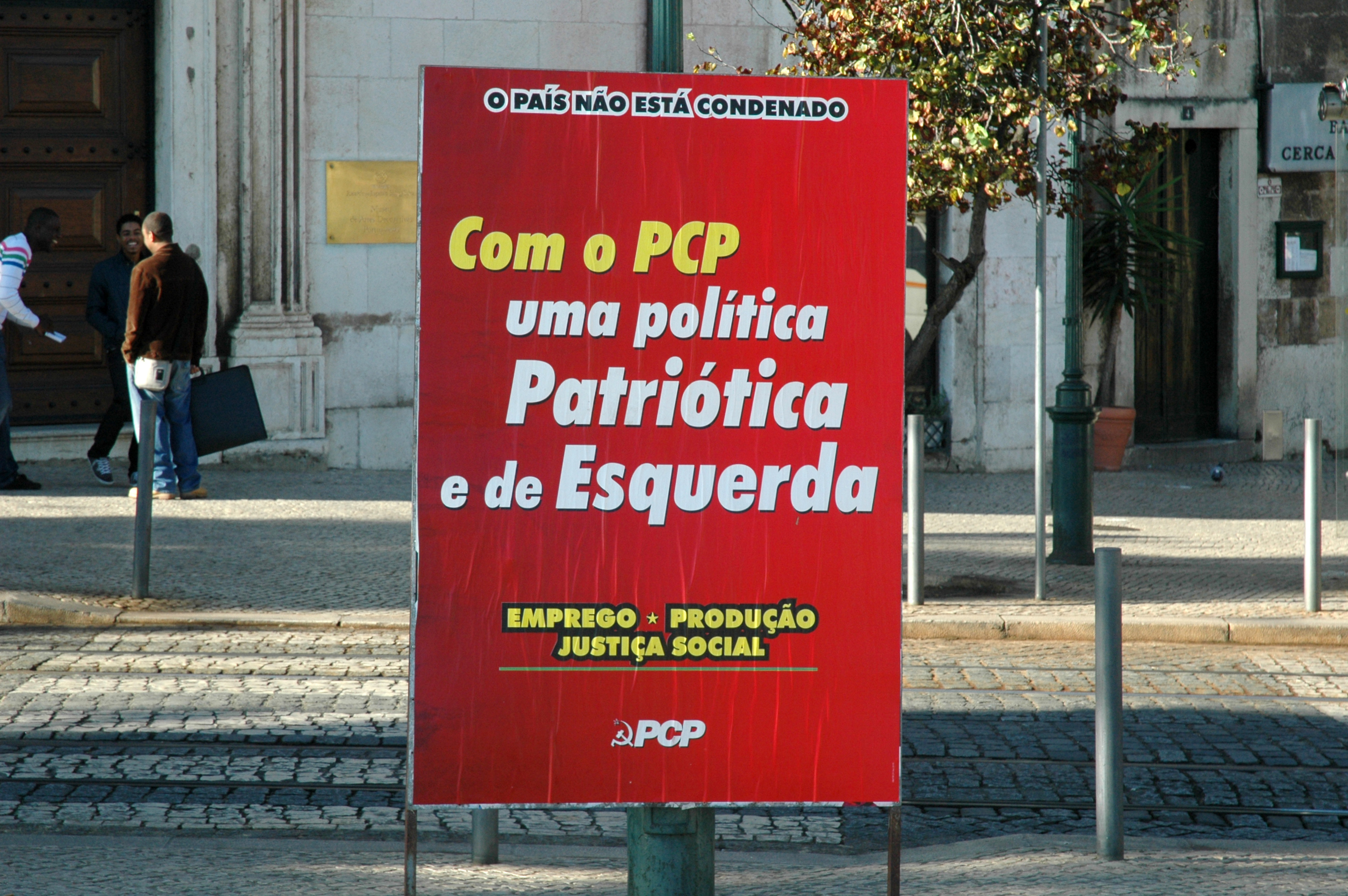
A 2010 poster, proclaiming "left-wing and patriotic politics".

The party opposes European integration and capitalism in general, and became known for its anti-austerity and anti-European Troika protests. It has been described as nationalist and Eurosceptic and one of its slogans is “for a patriotic and left politics.” It promotes "a form of Stalin's ‘socialism in one country’" that calls for the national liberation of Portugal "against capitalist elites and their foreign imperialist masters". The party argues that left-wing patriotism will lead to a "“sorely needed anti-monopolist, anti-imperialist rupture" and that the dissolution of NATO is a "crucial objective towards national sovereignty and world peace". The PCP "explicitly and frequently lays claims to patriotism". It frequently displays Portuguese national symbols, promotes a "national approach to the communist struggle", and states that its goals is to build "a free and sovereign country that realises a policy of unwavering defence of its interests, a patriotic policy". The party's former Member of the European Parliament, Pedro Guerreiro, stated:

Our history demonstrates that the great moments of progressive advance were carried out and reached by the popular masses, always having as base and aspiration the affirmation of national sovereignty and national independence – so it was with the April Revolution and the Constitution that consecrated it, so it is now with the patriotic and left-wing alternative that is necessary for the country. [...] Left-wing politics must be necessarily based on the affirmation and full exercise of national sovereignty and national independence – that is, left-wing politics must be patriotic or it will not be.

For the PCP, class struggle is associated with defending national sovereignty. The party argues that Portugal needs to establish 'national independence' and fight back imperialist forces before it could break with capitalism. It argues that "in [the] face of imperialism, the struggle for the defence of national sovereignty and independence is an expression of class struggle". One of the avenues through which Portugal is to defend its sovereignty is through breaking the foreign domination of Portuguese economy and ending the subjugation of Portugal to foreign interests. It proposes to counter the submissive place of Portugal in the economic world order through the establishment of a 'more scientific economy'; in the short term, the PCP envisions "the coexistence of state-run, self-managed, cooperative, collective, family and individually-run forms of private organization".

== Organization ==
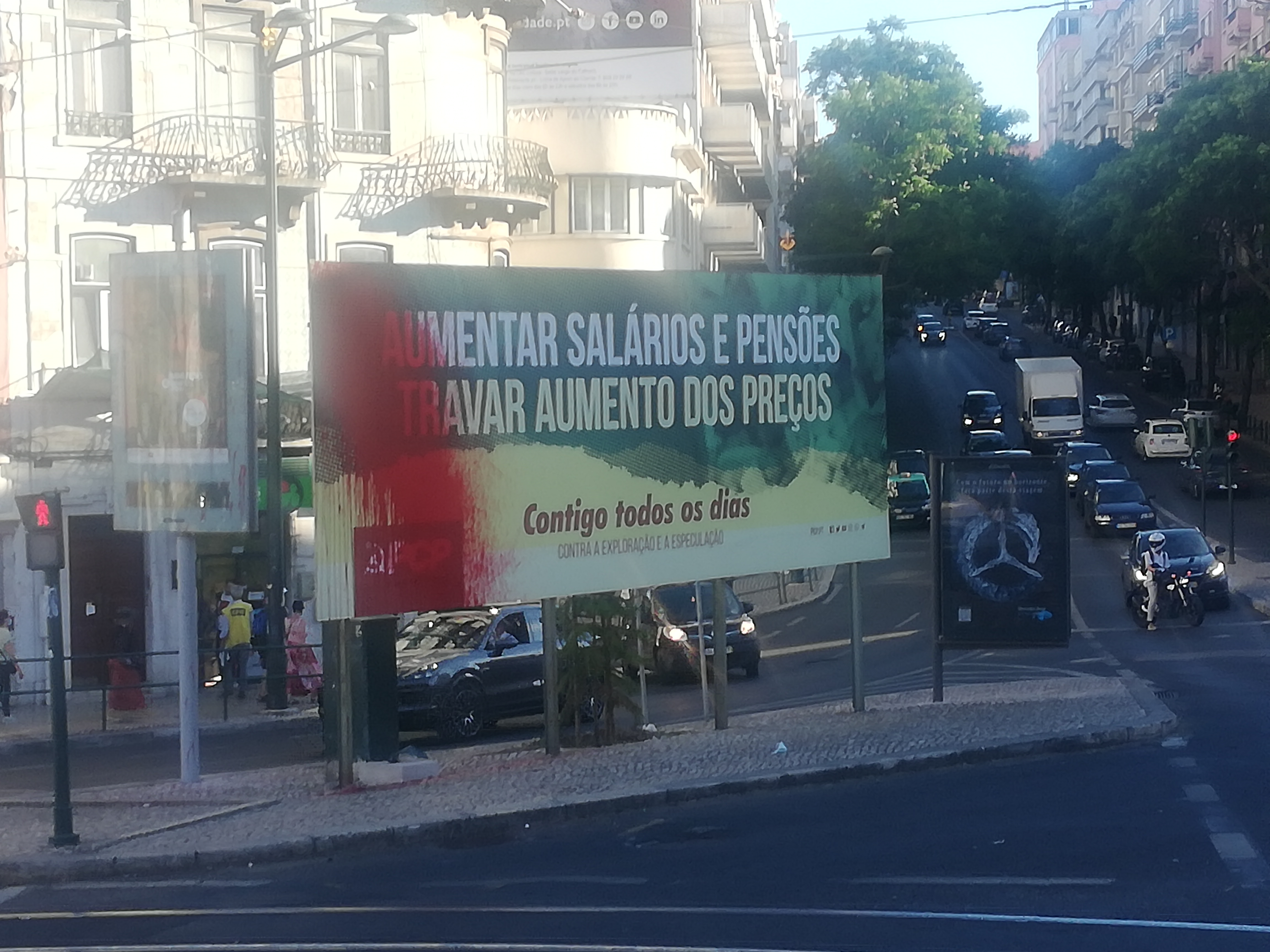
PCP billboard in Lisbon, reading "Increase salaries and pensions, stop price rises. With you everyday, against exploitation and speculation."

=== Structure ===
The official main principle that guides the party's internal structure is democratic centralism.

The structure and internal organization of the PCP are defined by its statutes. The most recent statutes were approved in the seventeenth congress, held in 2004. The upper organs of the PCP at the national level are the congress, the central committee, and the central commission of control.

The supreme organ of the party is its congress, which is summoned by the outgoing central committee and held every four years. The congress is composed of delegates elected by the respective lower organs proportional to each organ's membership size. The congress approves its theses after a wide discussion period inside the organizations and may also change the party's program and statutes. All the decisions of the congress are made by the delegates voting. With the exception of the voting for the central committee, which a recent Portuguese law requires to be secret, all voting, including the approval of the theses, are conducted by a show of hands. The theses, after approval, guide all the party's political actions and stances until the next congress.

The main organ between the congresses is the central committee, which is elected in the congresses under a proposal of the retiring central committee. This proposal may only be made after a long period of hearing the lower structures in order to include in it the names they propose. The CC may not change the orientation present in the congress' theses. The main task of the central committee is to define the guidelines of the party's political work and decide the immediate tasks of the party, assuring that the lower structures comply with those decisions. The CC elects, from its members, its Politburo, its Secretariat, and also the Central Commission of Control. This last must assure the compliance between the Party's activities and the statutes, and control the Party's finances. The CC may, or may not, elect the party's secretary-general from its members.

The intermediate organs of the Party are, by rule, the organs that coordinate an organization of district, municipality, and parish levels, but organizations at a neighbourhood or professional class level also exist. The main organ of an intermediate part of the party's structure is the Assembly. The Assembly works as a small Congress for the organization members. The Assembly elects the regional or municipal committees, which are responsible for applying the theses of the Assembly to the organization's work.

The base level organ of the Party is the cell. The cell is defined as being the link between the party and the working class and the masses. A cell is composed of a minimum of three Party members and exists at a work place or neighborhood level. The cell may elect its own secretariat, which has the responsibility of discussing and putting into practice the Party's guidelines. The cell must ensure the recruitment of new members, promote the reading of Avante! and the other publications, ensure that the members pay their membership fees and keep the upper structures aware of the cell's political work.

=== Youth organization ===
The youth organization of PCP is the Portuguese Communist Youth (Portuguese: Juventude Comunista Portuguesa), and was founded on 10 November 1979, after the unification of the Communist Students League and the Young Communist League. The Portuguese Communist Youth is a member of the World Federation of Democratic Youth.

=== Associated media ===
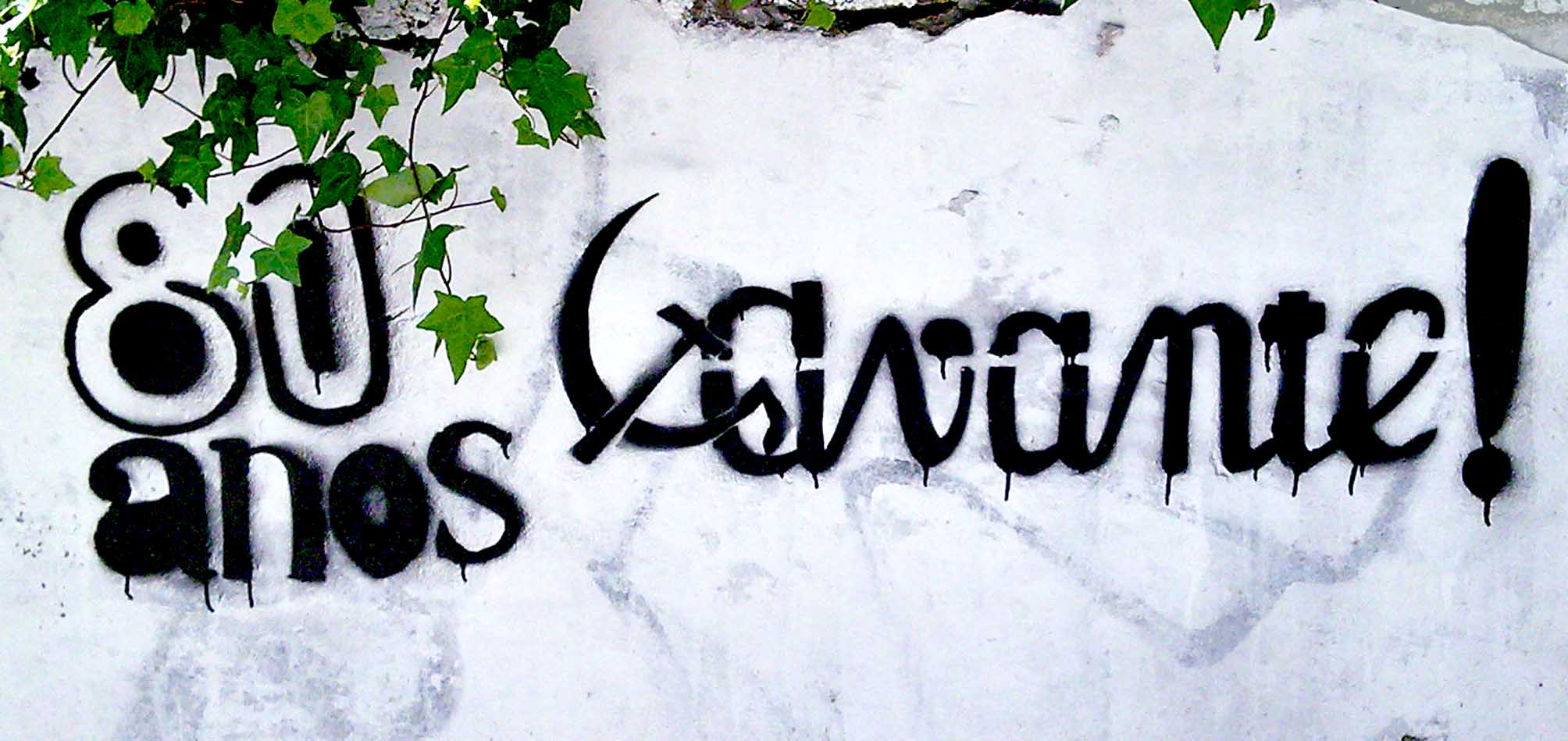
80 Anos Avante!, wall painting.

The Portuguese Communist Party publishes the weekly Avante! (Onward!), widely distributed throughout the country, and also the magazine of theoretical discussion O Militante (The Militant), published bi-monthly. The party's press also includes the bulletin Emigração (Emigration), targeted at the large Portuguese diaspora, and the magazine Portugal e a UE (Portugal and the EU), directed by the party's members elected in the European Parliament, which presents information related to the European politics and to the European United Left–Nordic Green Left group. Both Avante! and O Militante are sold in the party's offices to the members. Buying Avante! is considered one of the members' duties. Avante! is also sold among other newspapers in many news stands around the country.

Avante! was illegally printed and distributed from February 1931 until May 1974. Many times, the newspaper distribution suffered breakdowns due to the suppression by the political police of party members who helped to distribute the newspaper, or due to the destruction of the clandestine printing offices. Successfully evading official censorship, Avante! was one of the very few Portuguese newspapers that freely reported on events like World War II, the Colonial War in Africa or massive workers' strikes and waves of student protest against the dictatorship. Avante! continues to be printed after more than three decades of democracy, and has now a full online edition. The Avante! Festival was named after the newspaper.

During the campaign for the Portuguese legislative election of 2005, the party created a radio broadcast on its website and also a digital forum, being the first Portuguese party to use the internet actively in an electoral campaign. After the last Congress, the statutes were changed and the party now considers its website as another official media and it is regularly updated. The campaign radio broadcast evolved into an online radio station named Comunic. It broadcasts thematic interviews with party's members, music and propaganda.

Usually, the party's largest political campaigns and struggles are supported by the distribution of a massive number of leaflets and advertising posters in hot spots like train stations, factories, universities, main streets, and avenues or markets. The free television spots that the Portuguese law grants to the parties, either in the campaign time or out of it, are used by PCP to promote initiatives and political campaigns.

The party also owns a publishing company, Edições Avante! (Avante! Editions), that publishes and sells several books related to the party's history or to Marxism. Classics of Marxism–Leninism, such as The Communist Manifesto, Capital, On the Jewish Question, or What is to be Done?, several books of Portuguese authors on the history of the party and the resistance, official documents like the program or the statutes, books from foreign authors, like Ten Days that Shook the World and several other works are present in the Avante! Edition's catalog.

=== Avante! Festival ===
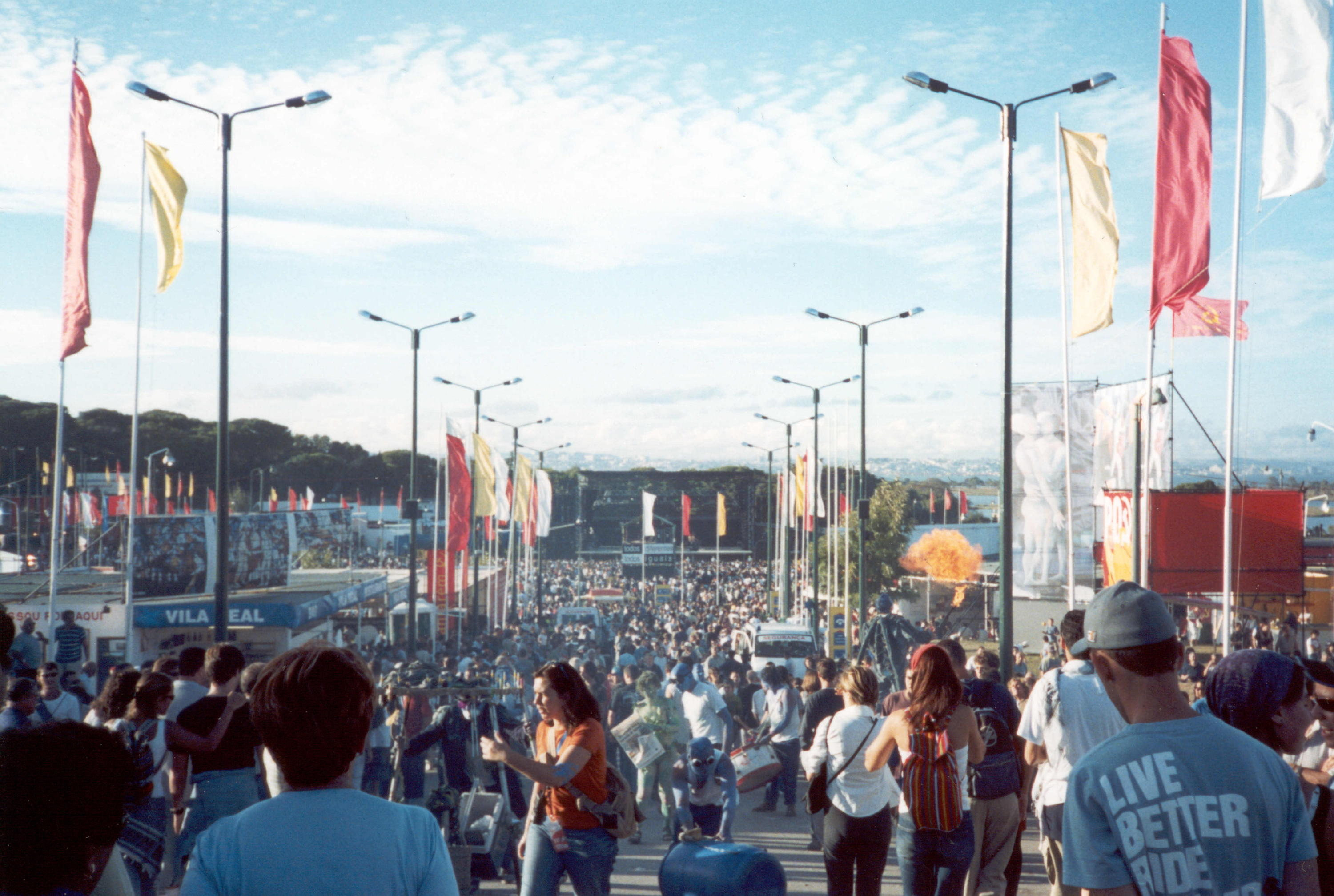
Picture of the main stage of Avante Festival in 2001

Every year, in the first weekend of September, the party holds a festival called the Avante! Festival (Portuguese: Festa do Avante!). After taking place in different locations around Lisbon, like the Lisbon International Fair, Ajuda, or Loures, it is now held in Amora, a city near Seixal, on land bought by the Party after a massive fundraising campaign in the early 1990s. The Party considered this campaign to be the only way to avoid the boycott organized by the owners of the previous festival grounds, a boycott that ultimately resulted in the Festival not being held in 1987.

The festival attracts hundreds of thousands of visitors. The events themselves consist of a three-day festival of music, with hundreds of Portuguese and international bands and artists across five different stages, ethnography, gastronomy, debates, a books and music fair, theatre (Avanteatro), cinema (Cineavante) and sporting events. Several foreign communist parties also participate.

Famous artists, communist and non-communist, Portuguese and non-Portuguese, have performed at the Festival, including Chico Buarque, Baden Powell, Ivan Lins, Zeca Afonso, Buffy Sainte-Marie, Holly Near, Johnny Clegg, Charlie Haden, Judy Collins, Richie Havens, Tom Paxton, Ska-P, The Soviet Circus Company, the Kuban Cossack Choir, Dexys Midnight Runners, The Band, Hevia, Brigada Victor Jara, Adriano Correia de Oliveira, Carlos Paredes, Jorge Palma, Manoel de Oliveira, Babylon Circus, and many others.

The preparation of the party begins right after the end of the previous festival. Hundreds of the Party's members and friends, mostly young people, volunteer.

=== Leadership ===
==== Secretaries-general ====
Name	Portrait	Constituency	Tenure			Prime Minister
Name	Portrait	Constituency	Start	End	Duration	Prime Minister
1	José de Sousa (1898–1967)		4 March 1923	May; 1923	~60 days	António Maria da Silva (1922–1923)
–	Vacant office		May; 1923	12 November 1923	~185 days	António Maria da Silva (1922–1923)
2	José Carlos Rates (1880–1961)		12 November 1923	30 May 1926	2 years, 199 days	António Maria da Silva (1922–1923)
2	José Carlos Rates (1880–1961)		12 November 1923	30 May 1926	2 years, 199 days	António Ginestal Machado (1923)
2	José Carlos Rates (1880–1961)		12 November 1923	30 May 1926	2 years, 199 days	Álvaro de Castro (1923–1924)
2	José Carlos Rates (1880–1961)		12 November 1923	30 May 1926	2 years, 199 days	Alfredo Rodrigues Gaspar (1924)
2	José Carlos Rates (1880–1961)		12 November 1923	30 May 1926	2 years, 199 days	José Domingues dos Santos (1924–1925)
2	José Carlos Rates (1880–1961)		12 November 1923	30 May 1926	2 years, 199 days	Vitorino Guimarães (1925)
2	José Carlos Rates (1880–1961)		12 November 1923	30 May 1926	2 years, 199 days	António Maria da Silva (1925)
2	José Carlos Rates (1880–1961)		12 November 1923	30 May 1926	2 years, 199 days	Domingos Pereira (1925)
2	José Carlos Rates (1880–1961)		12 November 1923	30 May 1926	2 years, 199 days	António Maria da Silva (1925–1926)
–	Vacant office		30 May 1926	21 April 1929	2 years, 326 days	José Mendes Cabeçadas (1926)
–	Vacant office		30 May 1926	21 April 1929	2 years, 326 days	Manuel Gomes da Costa (1926)
–	Vacant office		30 May 1926	21 April 1929	2 years, 326 days	Óscar Carmona (1926–1928)
–	Vacant office		30 May 1926	21 April 1929	2 years, 326 days	José Vicente de Freitas (1928–1929)
3	Bento Gonçalves (1902–1942)		21 April 1929	11 September 1942	13 years, 143 days	José Vicente de Freitas (1928–1929)
3	Bento Gonçalves (1902–1942)		21 April 1929	11 September 1942	13 years, 143 days	Artur Ivens Ferraz (1929–1930)
3	Bento Gonçalves (1902–1942)		21 April 1929	11 September 1942	13 years, 143 days	Domingos Oliveira (1930–1932)
3	Bento Gonçalves (1902–1942)		21 April 1929	11 September 1942	13 years, 143 days	António de Oliveira Salazar (1932–1968)
–	Vacant office		11 September 1942	31 March 1961	18 years, 201 days	António de Oliveira Salazar (1932–1968)
4	Álvaro Cunhal (1913–2005)	Lisbon	31 March 1961	5 December 1992	31 years, 249 days	António de Oliveira Salazar (1932–1968)
4	Álvaro Cunhal (1913–2005)	Lisbon	31 March 1961	5 December 1992	31 years, 249 days	Marcelo Caetano (1968–1974)
4	Álvaro Cunhal (1913–2005)	Lisbon	31 March 1961	5 December 1992	31 years, 249 days	Adelino da Palma Carlos (1974)
4	Álvaro Cunhal (1913–2005)	Lisbon	31 March 1961	5 December 1992	31 years, 249 days	Vasco Gonçalves (1974–1975)
4	Álvaro Cunhal (1913–2005)	Lisbon	31 March 1961	5 December 1992	31 years, 249 days	José Pinheiro de Azevedo (1975–1976)
4	Álvaro Cunhal (1913–2005)	Lisbon	31 March 1961	5 December 1992	31 years, 249 days	Mário Soares (1976–1978)
4	Álvaro Cunhal (1913–2005)	Lisbon	31 March 1961	5 December 1992	31 years, 249 days	Alfredo Nobre da Costa (1978)
4	Álvaro Cunhal (1913–2005)	Lisbon	31 March 1961	5 December 1992	31 years, 249 days	Carlos Mota Pinto (1978–1979)
4	Álvaro Cunhal (1913–2005)	Lisbon	31 March 1961	5 December 1992	31 years, 249 days	Maria de Lourdes Pintasilgo (1979–1980)
4	Álvaro Cunhal (1913–2005)	Lisbon	31 March 1961	5 December 1992	31 years, 249 days	Francisco Sá Carneiro (1980)
4	Álvaro Cunhal (1913–2005)	Lisbon	31 March 1961	5 December 1992	31 years, 249 days	Diogo Freitas do Amaral (1980–1981)
4	Álvaro Cunhal (1913–2005)	Lisbon	31 March 1961	5 December 1992	31 years, 249 days	Francisco Pinto Balsemão (1981–1983)
4	Álvaro Cunhal (1913–2005)	Lisbon	31 March 1961	5 December 1992	31 years, 249 days	Mário Soares (1983–1985)
4	Álvaro Cunhal (1913–2005)	Lisbon	31 March 1961	5 December 1992	31 years, 249 days	Aníbal Cavaco Silva (1985–1995)
5	Carlos Carvalhas (b. 1941)	Lisbon	5 December 1992	27 November 2004	11 years, 358 days	Aníbal Cavaco Silva (1985–1995)
5	Carlos Carvalhas (b. 1941)	Lisbon	5 December 1992	27 November 2004	11 years, 358 days	António Guterres (1995–2002)
5	Carlos Carvalhas (b. 1941)	Lisbon	5 December 1992	27 November 2004	11 years, 358 days	José Durão Barroso (2002–2004)
5	Carlos Carvalhas (b. 1941)	Lisbon	5 December 1992	27 November 2004	11 years, 358 days	Pedro Santana Lopes (2004–2005)
6	Jerónimo de Sousa (b. 1947)	Lisbon (1975–2002; 2005–2022); Setúbal (2002–2005)	27 November 2004	12 November 2022	17 years, 350 days	Pedro Santana Lopes (2004–2005)
6	Jerónimo de Sousa (b. 1947)	Lisbon (1975–2002; 2005–2022); Setúbal (2002–2005)	27 November 2004	12 November 2022	17 years, 350 days	José Sócrates (2005–2011)
6	Jerónimo de Sousa (b. 1947)	Lisbon (1975–2002; 2005–2022); Setúbal (2002–2005)	27 November 2004	12 November 2022	17 years, 350 days	Pedro Passos Coelho (2011–2015)
6	Jerónimo de Sousa (b. 1947)	Lisbon (1975–2002; 2005–2022); Setúbal (2002–2005)	27 November 2004	12 November 2022	17 years, 350 days	António Costa (2015–2024)
7	Paulo Raimundo (b. 1976)	Lisbon	12 November 2022	Incumbent	4 years, 8 days	António Costa (2015–2024)
7	Paulo Raimundo (b. 1976)	Lisbon	12 November 2022	Incumbent	4 years, 8 days	Luís Montenegro (since 2024)

==== Parliamentary leaders ====
- Octávio Pato (Lisbon): 2 June 1975 – 3 June 1976
- Carlos Brito (Faro): 3 June 1976 – 4 November 1991
- Carlos Carvalhas (Lisbon): 4 November 1991 – 5 December 1992
- Octávio Teixeira (Setúbal): 5 December 1992 – 13 June 2001
- Bernardino Soares (Lisbon): 13 June 2001 – 3 October 2013
- João Oliveira (Évora): 3 October 2013 – 29 March 2022
- Paula Santos (Setúbal): 29 March 2022 – present

== Electoral results ==
=== Assembly of the Republic ===
Vote share in the Portuguese legislative elections

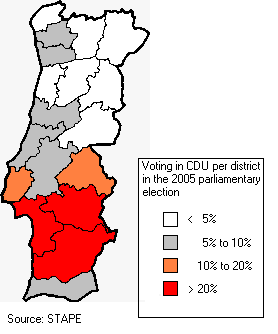
CDU results in the parliamentary election of 2005. (Azores and Madeira are not shown)

Election	Leader	Coalition	Votes	%	Seats	+/-	Government
1975	Álvaro Cunhal	None	711,935	12.5 (#3)	30 / 250		Constituent assembly
1976	Álvaro Cunhal	None	788,830	14.4 (#4)	40 / 263	▲10	Opposition
1979	Álvaro Cunhal	APU	1,129,322	18.8 (#3)	44 / 250	▲4	Opposition
1980	Álvaro Cunhal	APU	1,009,505	16.8 (#3)	39 / 250	▼5	Opposition
1983	Álvaro Cunhal	APU	1,031,609	18.1 (#3)	41 / 250	▲2	Opposition
1985	Álvaro Cunhal	APU	898,281	15.5 (#4)	35 / 250	▼6	Opposition
1987	Álvaro Cunhal	CDU	689,137	12.1 (#3)	29 / 250	▼6	Opposition
1991	Álvaro Cunhal	CDU	504,583	8.8 (#3)	15 / 230	▼14	Opposition
1995	Carlos Carvalhas	CDU	506,157	8.6 (#4)	13 / 230	▼2	Opposition
1999	Carlos Carvalhas	CDU	487,058	9.0 (#3)	15 / 230	▲2	Opposition
2002	Carlos Carvalhas	CDU	379,870	6.9 (#4)	10 / 230	▼5	Opposition
2005	Jerónimo de Sousa	CDU	433,369	7.5 (#3)	12 / 230	▲2	Opposition
2009	Jerónimo de Sousa	CDU	446,279	7.9 (#5)	13 / 230	▲1	Opposition
2011	Jerónimo de Sousa	CDU	441,147	7.9 (#4)	14 / 230	▲1	Opposition
2015	Jerónimo de Sousa	CDU	445,901	8.3 (#4)	15 / 230	▲1	Opposition (2015)
2015	Jerónimo de Sousa	CDU	445,901	8.3 (#4)	15 / 230	▲1	Confidence and supply (2015–2019)
2019	Jerónimo de Sousa	CDU	332,018	6.3 (#4)	10 / 230	▼5	Opposition
2022	Jerónimo de Sousa	CDU	238,920	4.3 (#6)	6 / 230	▼4	Opposition
2024	Paulo Raimundo	CDU	205,551	3.2 (#6)	4 / 230	▼2	Opposition
2025	Paulo Raimundo	CDU	183,686	2.9 (#6)	3 / 230	▼1	Opposition

=== Presidential elections ===
Election	Candidate	First round		Second round		Result
Election	Candidate	Votes	%	Votes	%	Result
1951	Ruy Luís Gomes	Removed from the ballot				
1958	Arlindo Vicente	Withdrew				
1965	No candidate					
1972	No candidate					
1976	Octávio Pato	365,344	7.6 (#4)			Lost ✗
1980	Carlos Brito	Withdrew				
1986	Ângelo Veloso	Withdrew				
1991	Carlos Carvalhas	635,867	12.9 (#3)			Lost ✗
1996	Jerónimo de Sousa	Withdrew				
2001	António Abreu	221,886	5.1 (#3)			Lost ✗
2006	Jerónimo de Sousa	466,428	8.6 (#4)			Lost ✗
2011	Francisco Lopes	300,921	7.1 (#4)			Lost ✗
2016	Edgar Silva	183,051	3.9 (#5)			Lost ✗
2021	João Ferreira	180,518	4.3 (#4)			Lost ✗
2026	António Filipe	92,644	1.6 (#7)			Lost ✗

Notes:

- In 1958, Arlindo Vicente withrew in favour of Humberto Delgado, lost.
- In 1980, Carlos Brito withdrew in favour of Ramalho Eanes, won.
- In 1986, Ângelo Veloso withdrew in favour of Salgado Zenha, lost.
- In 1986, in the second round, the Party supported Mário Soares, won.
- In 1996, Jerónimo de Sousa withdrew in favour of Jorge Sampaio, won.
- In 2026, in the second round, the Party supported António José Seguro, won.

=== Local elections ===
Election	Leader	Coalition	Votes	%	Mayors	+/-	Councillors	+/-	Assemblies	+/-	Parishes	+/-	Parish Assemblies	+/-
1976	Álvaro Cunhal	FEPU	737,586	17.7 (#3)	37 / 304		267 / 1,906		674 / 5,130		197 / 4,035		2,328 / 26,286	
1979	Álvaro Cunhal	APU	1,021,486	20.5 (#3)	50 / 305	▲13	322 / 1,937	▲55	1,785 / 9,926	▲1,111	299 / 4,042	▲102	5,072 / 41,199	▲2,744
1982	Álvaro Cunhal	APU	1,061,492	20.7 (#3)	55 / 305	▲5	325 / 1,953	▲3	1,781 / 10,001	▼4	334 / 4,050	▲35	5,099 / 42,199	▲27
1985	Álvaro Cunhal	APU	942,197	19.4 (#3)	47 / 305	▼8	305 / 1,981	▼20	1,062 / 6,730	▼719	355 / 4,138	▲21	3,675 / 32,016	▼1,424
1989	Álvaro Cunhal	CDU	633,682	12.8 (#3)	50 / 305	▲3	252 / 1,997	▼53	848 / 6,763	▼214	339 / 4,207	▼16	2,929 / 33,130	▼746
1993	Carlos Carvalhas	CDU	689,928	12.8 (#3)	49 / 305	▼1	246 / 2,011	▼6	803 / 6,792	▼45	316 / 4,220	▼23	2,747 / 33,554	▼182
1997	Carlos Carvalhas	CDU	643,956	12.0 (#3)	41 / 305	▼8	236 / 2,021	▼10	798 / 6,807	▼5	280 / 4,240	▼36	2,731 / 34,008	▼16
2001	Carlos Carvalhas	CDU	557,481	10.6 (#3)	28 / 308	▼13	199 / 2,044	▼37	709 / 6,876	▼89	232 / 4,129	▼48	2,466 / 34,569	▼265
2005	Jerónimo de Sousa	CDU	589,384	10.9 (#3)	32 / 308	▲4	203 / 2,046	▲4	722 / 6,885	▲13	244 / 4,125	▲12	2,576 / 34,498	▲110
2009	Jerónimo de Sousa	CDU	540,053	9.7 (#3)	28 / 308	▼4	174 / 2,078	▼29	651 / 6,946	▼71	213 / 4,107	▼31	2,266 / 34,672	▼310
2013	Jerónimo de Sousa	CDU	552,690	11.1 (#3)	34 / 308	▲6	213 / 2,086	▲39	747 / 6,487	▲96	170 / 3,085	▼43	1,973 / 27,167	▼293
2017	Jerónimo de Sousa	CDU	489,185	9.5 (#3)	24 / 308	▼10	171 / 2,074	▼42	619 / 6,461	▼128	139 / 3,083	▼31	1,665 / 27,005	▼308
2021	Jerónimo de Sousa	CDU	410,666	8.2 (#3)	19 / 308	▼5	148 / 2,064	▼23	505 / 6,448	▼114	112 / 3,066	▼27	1,446 / 26,790	▼219
2025	Paulo Raimundo	CDU	316,273	5.7 (#4)	12 / 308	▼7	93 / 2,058	▼55	342 / 6,463	▼163	97 / 3,221	▼15	1,060 / 27,977	▼386

=== European Parliament ===
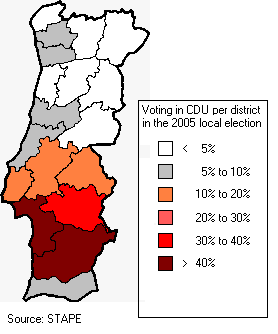
CDU results in the local election of 2005. (Azores and Madeira are not shown)

Election	Leader	Coalition	Votes	%	Seats	+/–	EP Group
1987	Ângelo Veloso	CDU	648,700	11.5 (#4)	3 / 24		COM
1989	Carlos Carvalhas	CDU	597,759	14.4 (#3)	3 / 24	Steady	COM
1994	Luís Sá	CDU	340,725	11.2 (#4)	3 / 25	Steady	GUE/NGL
1999	Ilda Figueiredo	CDU	357,671	10.3 (#3)	2 / 25	▼1	GUE/NGL
2004	Ilda Figueiredo	CDU	309,401	9.1 (#3)	2 / 24	Steady	GUE/NGL
2009	Ilda Figueiredo	CDU	379,787	10.6 (#4)	2 / 22	Steady	GUE/NGL
2014	João Ferreira	CDU	416,925	12.7 (#3)	3 / 21	▲1	GUE/NGL
2019	João Ferreira	CDU	228,045	6.9 (#4)	2 / 21	▼1	The Left
2024	João Oliveira	CDU	162,630	4.1 (#6)	1 / 21	▼1	The Left

=== Regional elections ===
Region	Election	Leader	Votes	%	Seats	+/-	Government
Azores	2024	Paula Decq Mota	1,821	1.6 (#7)	0 / 57	Steady	No Seats
Madeira	2025	Edgar Silva	2,543	1.8 (#7)	0 / 47	Steady	No Seats

== See also ==
- Politics of Portugal
- List of political parties in Portugal
- Carnation Revolution
- Unitary Democratic Coalition
- Avante!
- Armed Revolutionary Action

== Bibliography ==
=== Academic sources ===
- Madeira, João (2011). "O Partido Comunista Português e a Guerra Fria: "sectarismo", "desvio de direita", "Rumo à vitória" (1949-1965)" (PDF). NOVA University Lisbon. Archived (PDF) from the original on 28 August 2020.
