= Manuel Ribeiro =

Portuguese politician

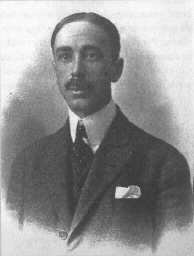
- Born: 13 December 1878; Albernoa, Beja, Portugal
- Died: 27 November 1941 (aged 62); Lisbon, Portugal
- Notable work: A Catedral (1920); O Deserto (1922); A Ressureição (1923)
- Political party: Portuguese Communist Party
- Movement: Literary realism

Manuel António Ribeiro (13 December 1878 – 27 November 1941) was a Portuguese writer, poet, and relevant political figure during the First Portuguese Republic. He is known for his role as an active proponent of syndicalism in the early 20th century, as the founder of the first Bolshevist organisation in Portugal (the Portuguese Maximalist Federation), as well as one of the first organisers of the Portuguese Communist Party.

In 1926, having already shown a certain religious disquiet as well as a profound interest in sacred art and liturgy, he formally converted to Catholicism, which implied his abandonment of the socialist movement and of his partisan activity, but not of his social concerns: he became aligned with Christian democratic sectors that espoused the modern Catholic social teaching of Pope Leo XIII's Rerum Novarum, he never denounced the labour movement, and denounced fascism. In 1932, he started publishing Era Nova, a religious and political weekly openly opposed to Salazar's ideology, that is soon after labelled as radical propaganda and shut down.

His literary works, particularly his "social trilogy" consisting of A Catedral ("The Cathedral", 1920), O Deserto ("The Desert", 1922), and A Ressureição ("The Resurrection", 1923), made Manuel Ribeiro one of the most widely-read novelists in Portugal in the 1920s, but were deliberately obscured in the following decades by the authoritarian conservative Estado Novo regime.
