= Portuguese Communist Youth =

Youth organization of the Portuguese Communist Party

Portuguese Communist Youth Juventude Comunista Portuguesa
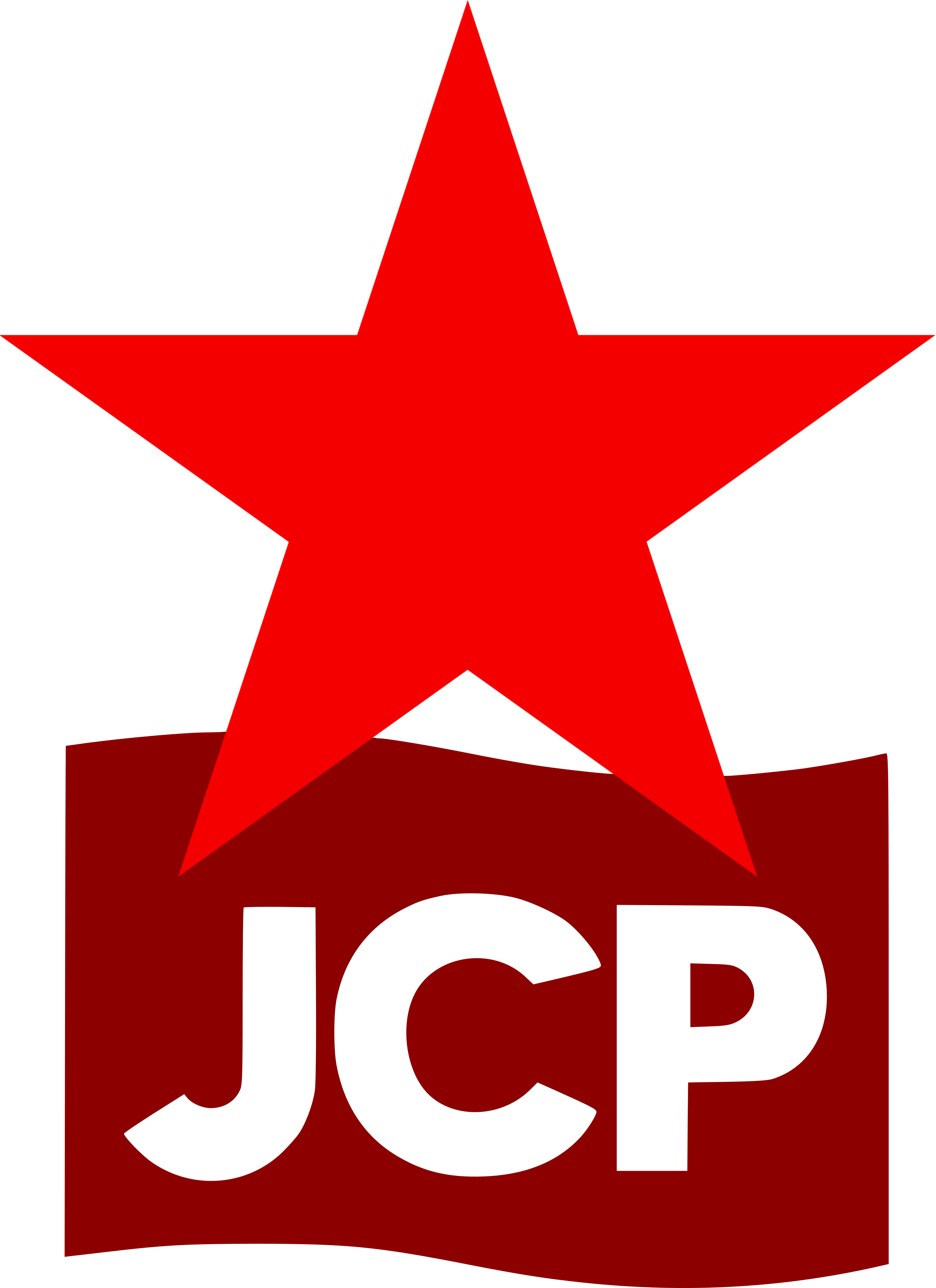
- Founded: 1979; 47 years ago
- Headquarters: Lisbon, Portugal
- Ideology: Marxism–Leninism; Communism
- Mother party: Portuguese Communist Party
- International affiliation: World Federation of Democratic Youth

The Portuguese Communist Youth (Portuguese: Juventude Comunista Portuguesa or JCP) is the youth organization of the Portuguese Communist Party, and was founded on 10 November 1979, after the unification of the Young Communist League and the Communist Students League.

The JCP has a political relationship with the Portuguese Communist Party; however, it is an independent organization. The headquarters of the JCP are located in Lisbon.

The JCP is a member of the World Federation of Democratic Youth (WFDY), a non-governmental youth organization that congregates several left-wing youth organizations from all continents. The WFDY holds an international event, named the World Festival of Youth and Students, in which the Portuguese Communist Youth participates. JCP has held the presidency of the World Federation of Democratic Youth in the past and maintains an active role in the Federation.

Composed of students and working-class youth, the JCP's main political concerns and interventions are on the subject of the promotion of a free and public education in all degrees, employment, access to sports and culture, peace, and housing.

JCP also promotes international brigades for countries like Cuba, Palestine, and Venezuela, both alone and with other European communist youth organizations like EDON and SDAJ.

== Goals ==
At the JCP, "the youth strengthens the friendship ties, communal action and solidarity which joins the youth and people of the entire world in the struggle against exploitation and oppression, against imperialism, racism and xenophobia, for the preservation of the environment, for peace, democracy, national independence, progress and social justice. They work and fight for a new society to be built with the portuguese people, where there is no place for exploitation, where is achievable the full realization of the rights and aspirations of the youth and where life has the widest horizons of individual and collective fulfillment, through socialism and on a path towards communism."

The base principles of the JCP are:

- The cooperation between communist youth organizations and other revolutionary/progressive youth groups;
- Solidarity towards the laborers and youth from other countries, as well as the peoples fighting against exploitation and oppression;
- The struggle for employment with rights;
- The struggle for free public healthcare and education, of good quality, for all;
- The struggle for peace and solidarity between peoples;
- The struggle for the right to housing;
- The struggle for the recognition of sexual and reproductive rights;
- The struggle for a planned economy;
- The struggle for a sovereign country and an advanced democracy.

== Structure ==
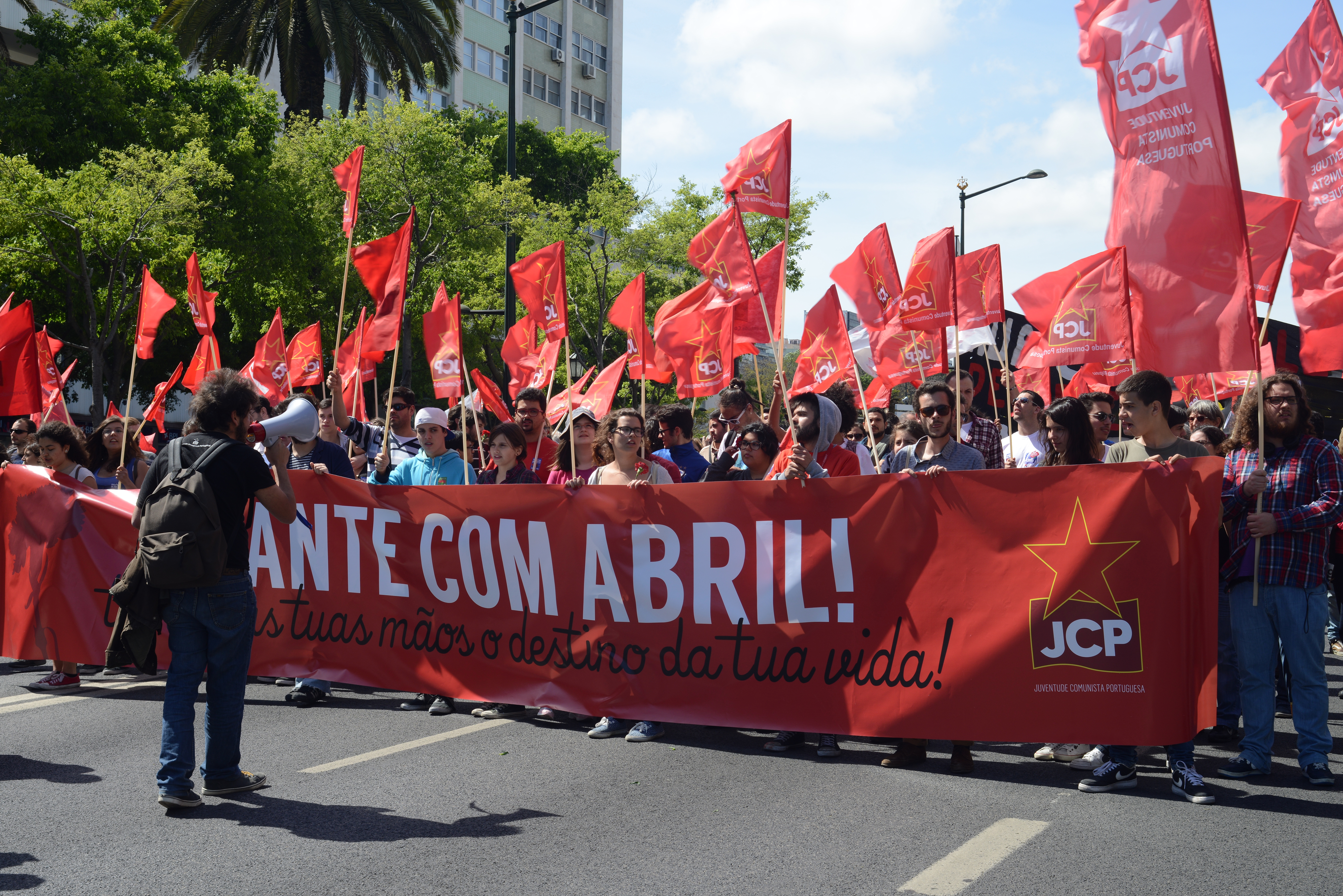
JCP demonstration in Lisbon

The main organ of the JCP is the congress, a political convention that is held each three years. In the congress, the organization defines its political strategies and elects a new National Committee.

Between the congresses, the main organ is the National Committee, which assures that the political guidelines are being implemented, schedules and carries out the national activities of the JCP, manages the property and funds, and also assures the JCP's international relations.

Each member of the JCP belongs to a local group in their school, town, or work place. These groups belong to a regional organization, usually at the district level. The regional organization holds regional activities, and is managed by a regional committee.

In a different level, the JCP divides its work and structure in three main sector level organizations: the organization of the intermediate and high school students, the organization of the university and college students, and a last one to the young working people. Each of these co-ordinates the work and the activities related to each corresponding sector.

== See also ==
- Portugal
- Politics of Portugal
- Portuguese Communist Party
- Communism
- Marxism–Leninism
