= Young Communist League (Portugal) =

Youth wing of the Portuguese Communist Party

Young Communist League Portuguese: União dos Jovens Comunistas
- Founded: 1975
- Dissolved: 10 November 1979
- Merged into: Portuguese Communist Youth
- Mother party: Portuguese Communist Party

Young Communist League (Portuguese: União dos Jovens Comunistas) was the youth wing of the Portuguese Communist Party. UJC was founded in 1975.

In January 1978 the UJC engaged in discussion with the Communist Students League (UEC) with regard to a merger, and on 10 November 1979 the UJC and UEC merged to form the Portuguese Communist Youth (JCP). The first JCP conference was held on the 24 and 25 May 1980.

UJC sticker
