= Agriculture in Portugal =

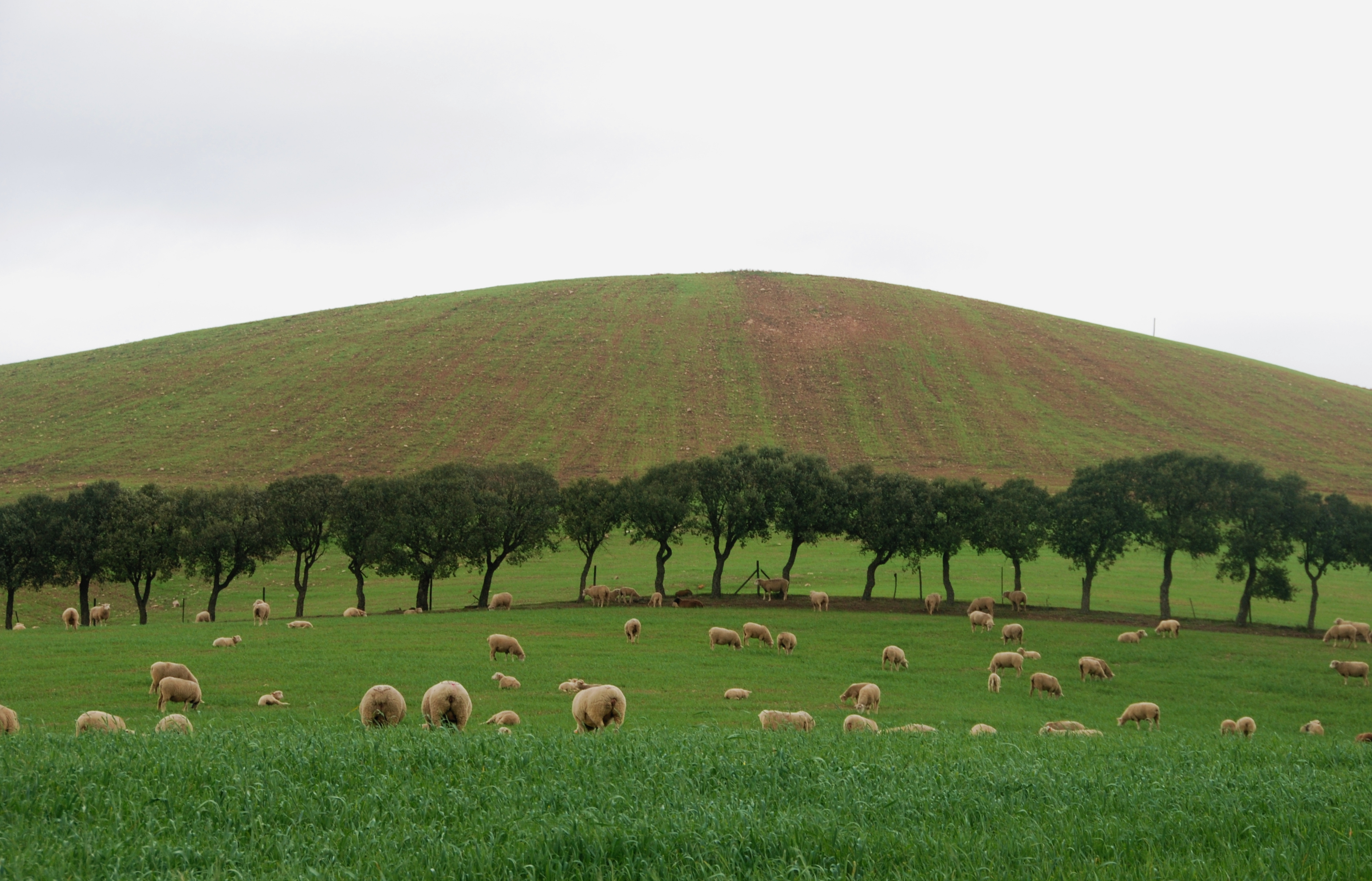
Portugal has about 530 thousand hectares of permanent pasture, including this pasture in the Alentejo Litoral subregion.

Agriculture in Portugal is based on small to medium-sized family-owned dispersed units; however, the sector also includes larger-scale intensive farming export-oriented agrobusinesses backed by companies (like Grupo RAR's Vitacress, Sovena, Lactogal, Vale da Rosa, Companhia das Lezírias and Valouro). The extent of cooperative organisation has been reaching a greater importance with globalization. Portugal produces a wide variety of products, including green vegetables, rice, corn, wheat, barley, olives, oilseeds, nuts, cherries, bilberry, table grapes and edible mushrooms. Forestry has also played an important economic role among the rural communities and industry (namely the paper industry that includes Portucel Soporcel Group, the engineered wood industry that includes Sonae Indústria, and the furniture industry that includes several manufacturing plants in and around Paços de Ferreira, the core of Portugal's major industrial operations of IKEA). In 2013, the gross agricultural product accounted for 2.4% of the GDP. Portugal is the largest world producer of both cork and carob, as well as the third largest exporter of chestnut and the third largest European producer of pulp. Portugal is among the top ten largest olive oil producers in the world and is the fourth biggest exporter. The country is also one of the world's largest exporters of wine, being reputed for its fine wines. The land area of slightly more than 9.2 million hectares was classified as follows (in thousands of hectares): 2,755 arable land and permanent crops (including 710 in permanent crops), 530 permanent pasture, 3,640 forest and woodland, and 2,270 other land.

== History ==
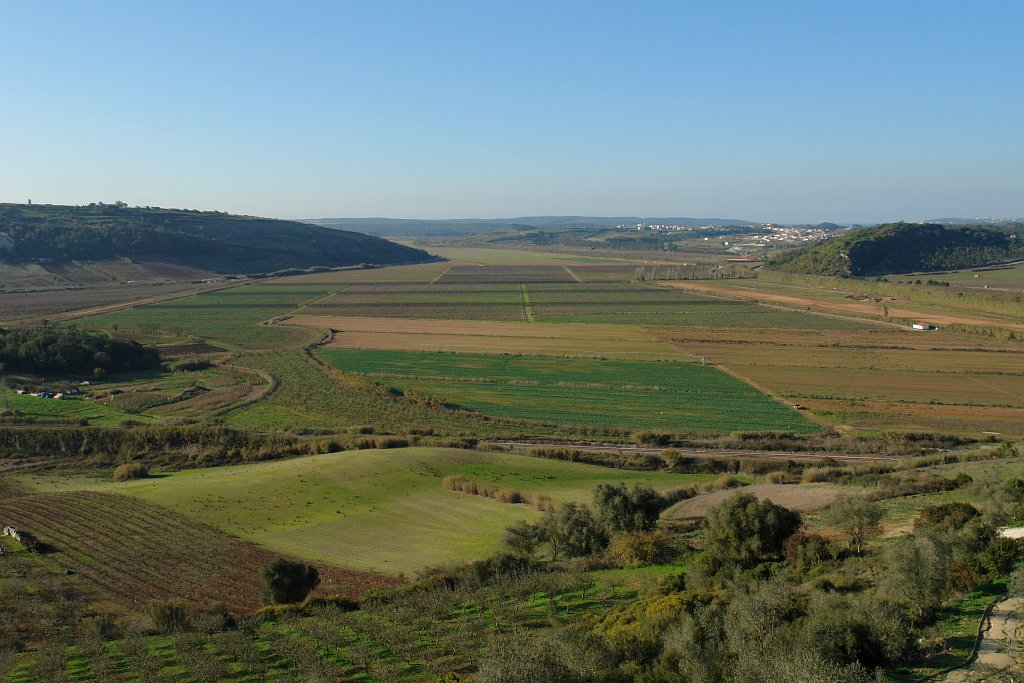
Most of Portugal's farms have a small area devoted to a diversified intensive farming, like these in the Oeste Subregion.

Agriculture, forestry, and fishing employed 17.8 percent of Portugal's labour force but accounted for only 6.2 percent of GDP in 1990. With the principal exception of the alluvial soils of the Tagus River valley and the irrigated sections of the Alentejo, crop yields and animal productivity remained well below those of the other European Community (EC) members. Portugal's agro-food deficit (attributable mainly to grain, oilseed, and meat imports) represented about 2.5 percent of GDP, but its surplus on forestry products (wood, cork, and paper pulp) offset its food deficit.

Portugal's overall agricultural performance was unfavourable when viewed in the context of the country's natural resources and climatic conditions. Agricultural productivity (gross farm output per person employed) was well below that of the other West European countries in 1985, at half of the levels in Greece and Spain and a quarter of the EC average.

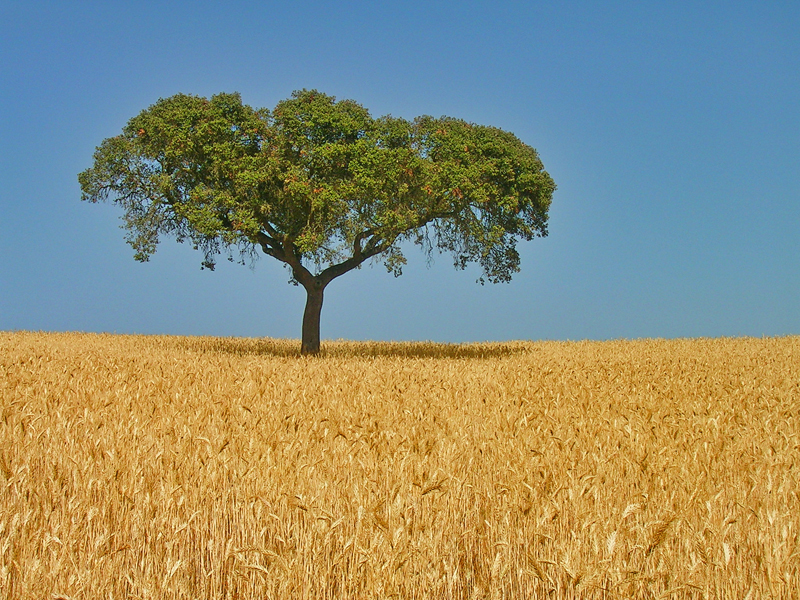
The region of Alentejo is known as the "breadbasket of Portugal" due to its extensive farming and cereal production.

A number of factors contributed to Portugal's poor agricultural performance. First, the level of investment in agriculture was traditionally very low. The number of tractors and the quantity of fertilizer used per unit area was one-third the European Community average in the mid-1980s. Second, farms in the north were small and fragmented; half of them were less than one hectare in size, and 86 percent less than five hectares. Third, the collective farms set up in the south after the 1974–75 expropriations following the military coup of 25 April 1974, proved incapable of modernizing, and their efficiency declined. Fourth, poor productivity was associated with the low level of education of farmers. Finally, distribution channels and economic infrastructure were inadequate in parts of the country. According to government estimates, about 9,000 km^{2} (2,200,000 acres) of agricultural land were occupied between April 1974 and December 1975 in the name of land reform; about 32% of the occupations were ruled illegal. In January 1976, the government pledged to restore the illegally occupied land to its owners, and in 1977, it promulgated the Land Reform Review Law. Restoration of illegally occupied land began in 1978.

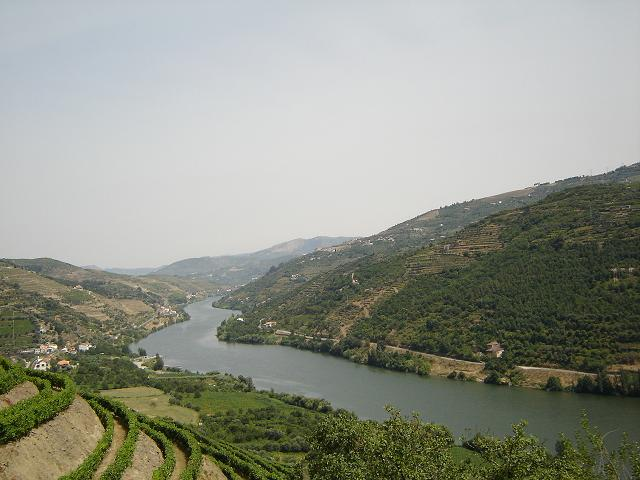
Portuguese wines include the famous Port wine which is produced from vineyards of the Douro Valley in northern Portugal.

Following its adhesion in 1986 to the European Economic Community (EEC), now the European Union (EU), Portugal's agriculture, like in other EU member states, has been heavily shaped by the Common Agricultural Policy (CAP). With the reform of CAP, a significant reduction in the number of producers through consolidation (especially in the Norte and Centro regions) resulted in the end of traditional, subsistence-like based agriculture.

In 1998, 28% of the land was considered arable. Of the 26,000 km^{2} (7 million acres), 74% was cultivated with seasonal crops and 26% was under permanent crops. In 2001, the gross agricultural product accounted for 4% of GDP. In 1999, Portugal produced 949,117 tons of potatoes (389,800 tons in 2012); 1,151,526 tons of tomatoes (1,392,700 tons in 2012); 15,766 tons of sweet potatoes (20,000 tons in 2012); 373,131 tons of wheat (59,000 tons in 2012); 333,000 tons of olives (627,000 tons in 2013); 151,650 tons of rice (184,100 tons in 2012); 215,337 tons of oranges (183,400 tons in 2012). Wine, particularly Port and Madeira from the Douro region and the Madeira islands, is an important agricultural export; production totalled 679,000 tons in 1999, down from 1,137,000 tons in 1990. Portugal, as of 2013, is the world's tenth-largest producer of wine, although Portugal's wines are mostly unknown internationally apart from Port and Rosé. Under the influence of EU policies, vineyard areas have been reduced in recent years. In 2012, the food deficit (food imports minus food exports) was of €3.33 billion.

== Major agricultural products ==
Portugal's climatic and topographic conditions allow for a large number of crops, including olives, figs, citrus, mushrooms, sunflower, tomatoes, cereals, bananas (in Madeira Island) and pineapple (in São Miguel Island). Wine, table grapes, leaf vegetables, dairy, tomatoes for processing, rice, sugar beets, mushrooms, cork and olives are competitive. Improved marketing practices since the 1990s increased the demand for fresh horticultural and fruit products of Portuguese origin in both the domestic and export markets.

In 2018, Portugal was the 9th largest world producer of olives (740 thousand tons), the 16th largest world producer of pear (162 thousand tons), the 17th largest world producer of tomatoes (1.33 million tons) and the 20th largest world producer of grape (778 thousand tons). The country also produced, in the same year, 713 thousand tons of maize, 431 thousand tons of potato, 344 thousand tons of orange, 267 thousand tons of apple, 160 thousand tons of rice, in addition to smaller yields of other agricultural products such as cabbage (137 thousand tons), onion (130 thousand tons), carrot (108 thousand tons), wheat (67 thousand tons), melon (57 thousand tons), oats (55 thousand tons), etc.

Portugal's cereals production only meets 20% of consumption. Oats production meets 67.6% of consumption; rye production meets 44.7% of consumption; corn production meets 26.8% of consumption and wheat production meets 4% of consumption.

=== Beef ===
The European Union recognises the following Portuguese Protected Designation of Origin beef brands:

- Carne Alentejana, Carne Arouquesa, Carne Barrosã, Carne Cachena da Peneda, Carne da Charneca, Carne de Bovino Cruzado dos Lameiros do Barroso, Carne dos Açores, Carne Marinhoa, Carne Maronesa, Carne Mertolenga, Carne Mirandesa.

=== Cheeses ===
Portugal produces a wide variety of cheeses. There are certified cheese-producing regions, including D.O.C./Protected designation of origin (Denominação de Origem Controlada). These include the Azeitão, Cabra Transmontano, Castelo Branco, Nisa, Pico, São Jorge, Saloio, Santarém, Serpa and Serra da Estrela cheeses.

=== Fruit ===
Rocha Pear
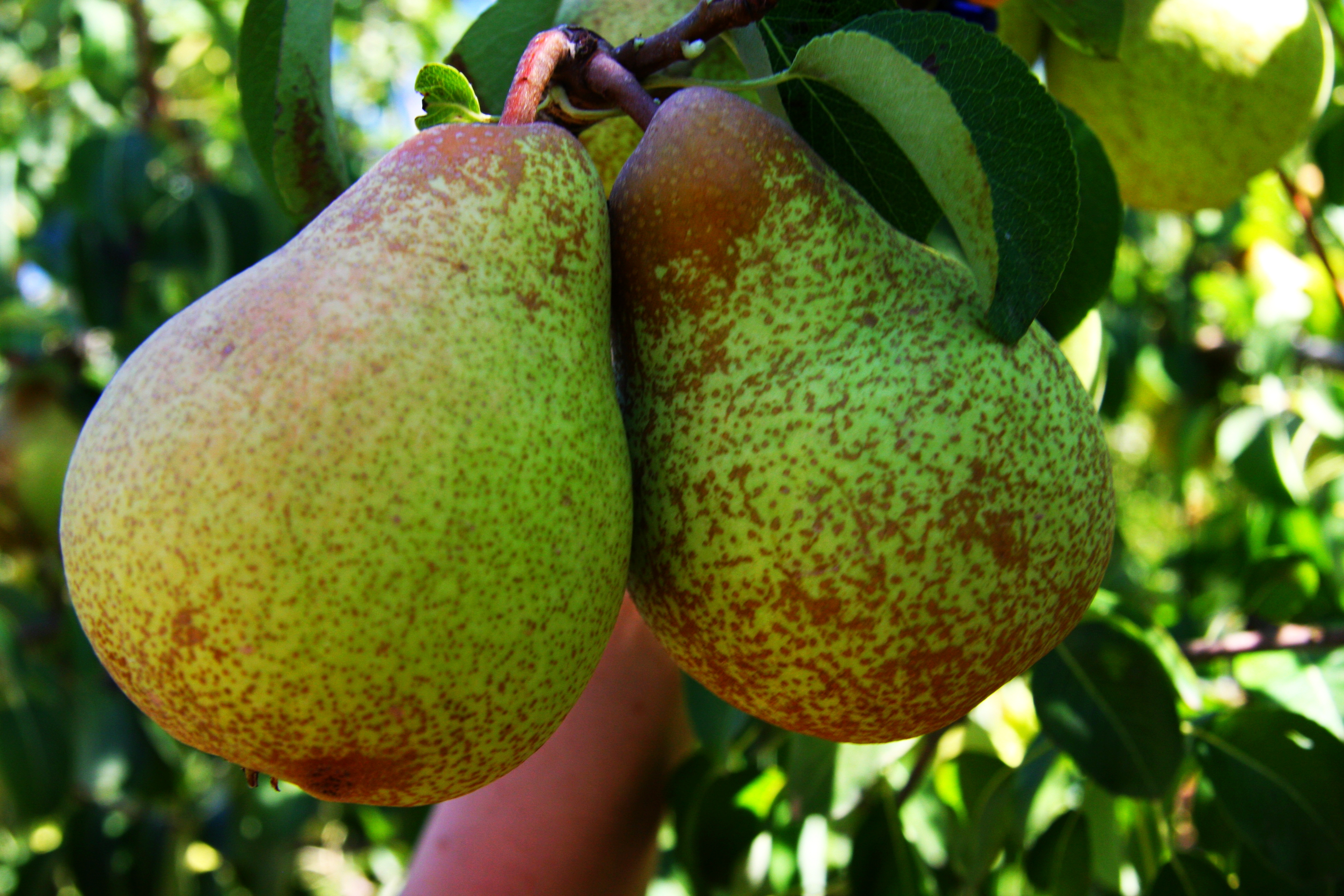
- 'Rocha' Pear is a native Portuguese variety of pear which gained success in the Portuguese export-oriented fruit market.
- Genus: Pyrus
- Species: Pyrus communis
- Cultivar: 'Rocha'
- Origin: Sintra, Portugal

Pêra Rocha (pears), Maçã de Alcobaça (apples), Cova da Beira's cherries, a number of chestnut producing regions, and the Laranja do Algarve (oranges), are examples of well-known Portuguese certified products. Portugal is the largest producer of carob in the world and the 5th largest producer of tomato in Europe, mostly at Alentejo.

In 2017, Portugal produced 876,215 tons of olives; 868,635 tons of grapes; 329,371 tons of apples; 319,743 tons of oranges; 202,277 tons of pears, 41,646 tons of peaches and nectarines; 39,588 tons of melons; 39,052 tons of tangerines, mandarins, clementines and satsumas; 35,411 tons of kiwifruit; 30,957 tons of watermelons; 29,875 tons of chestnuts 29,784 tons of plums and sloes and 27,844 tons of bananas.

=== Pork ===
Distribution of the genus Quercus in Portugal. Quercus robur Quercus pyrenaica Quercus faginea Quercus ilex Quercus suber

Pork is also a very popular meat in Portugal. Pork meat is often served with acorns and white truffles that are commonly found in the large oak grove (genus Quercus) of the country. The Carne de Porco Alentejano has the status of Protected Designation of Origin (POD). There are many dishes with pork like the carne de porco à alentejana and the typical leitão (roasted piglet). Pork made presunto, a dry-cured ham, is also typical and popular, as well as fiambre, a wet-cured ham.

=== Wines ===
The quality and great variety of wines in Portugal are due to noble castas, microclimates, soils and proper technology.

Official designations:

- Quality Wine Produced in a Specific Region (QWPSR) or VQPRD – Vinho de Qualidade Produzido em Região Demarcada
  - These are the most protected wine and indicates a specific vineyard, such as Port Wine, Vinhos Verdes, and Alentejo Wines. These wines are labeled D.O.C. (Denominação de Origem Controlada) which secures a superior quality.
- Wines that have more regulations placed upon them but are not in a DOC region fall under the category of Indicação de Proveniência Regulamentada (IPR, Indication of Regulated Provenance).
- Regional Wine – Vinho Regional Carries with it a specific region within Portugal.
- Table Wines – Vinho de Mesa carries with it only the producer and the designation that it is from Portugal.

== Agribusiness ==
Among the largest companies in the agricultural and agribusiness sector of Portugal are such examples as Grupo RAR (owner of Vitacress), Companhia das Lezírias, Vale da Rosa, Sovena Group, Sumol + Compal, Sogrape, Derovo, Frulact, Amorim, Delta, Valouro and Lactogal. The leading Portuguese brewer Unicer, developed and supported agriculture projects for barley producers in Portugal. Its aim was the increase of Portuguese high-quality malt for use in the producing process of its beers.

== Retail market and distribution ==
Competitors are always well represented at Portuguese agricultural fairs and food-related shows. Other nations advertise in Portugal's food magazines and on television, and join with hotels in weekly menu promotions, complete with food products, cooks, exhibits and decorations.

Competition also heats up among Portuguese and foreign firms over extremely expensive hypermarket shelf space. Suppliers fight to maintain and expand exposure of their products as the number of hypermarkets boomed since the 1990s. The struggle is getting even more intense as larger stores continue to carry more private label products, constricting shelf space even more for branded products. Modelo Continente, Jerónimo Martins, Lidl and Auchan are the biggest retailers.

Local manufacturers felt the squeeze on profit margins as big retailers preferred to cut costs by buying from neighboring countries. France and Spain dominate consumer-ready frozen and non-frozen food products. Spanish fruits and horticultural products are easily found all over Portugal's hypermarket and supermarket chains. The European Union, South America, the Middle East and China also compete with dried fruits, tree nuts, pulses and prepared product markets.

With a land area about the size of the US state of Indiana, Portugal maintains quite a varied distribution network. The food distribution structure includes wholesalers, retailers (hypermarkets, supermarkets, cooperatives, small businesses, convenience stores), institutions and associations. Portuguese retailers generally make their purchases through a broker from the manufacturer or directly from a distributor, cash-and-carry store, traditional wholesaler or from retailer associations and cooperatives. The associations and cooperatives, made up mostly of small store owners, help members increase purchasing power, compete with larger stores and access training and trade seminars. But the role of import agents and traditional brokers declined, and retailers are becoming more adept at direct importing.

Hypermarkets and supermarkets, including joint ventures between the Portuguese and French, control over 50 percent of retail food sales. The Portuguese government put the brakes on the tremendous growth of hypermarkets in an effort to protect smaller retailers. With their high buying power, the hypermarkets can be more competitive in pricing and could easily squeeze smaller businesses out of the marketplace.

== Organic farming ==
Organic farming in Portugal has steadily increased in the past years. From only 73 producers in 1993, it rapidly grew to more than 1,500 in 2005. Today, more than 2,000 km^{2} are managed organically, which testifies to the prevailing dynamics. The farmers’ sudden interest in organic agriculture clearly has to do with the financial support offered by the European Union and higher market prices. In some cases, such as the olive groves of the northern and central regions, traditional farming approximates organic farming methods, which eases conversion. With horticulture or orchards, the change is not so easy, and therefore there are not as many farmers converting. The supply is still less than the demand, reflecting the fact that organic farming is still at an initial stage. The Portuguese are growing more conscious of health and the environment, which explains the rising interest in natural foods and fibres. Their increasing purchasing power encourages this development. However, these positive factors for the expansion of organic production may not be enough to guarantee a continuous increase in the future, since several obstacles hinder the farmers’ performance.

In 2011, more than 220,000 hectares were managed organically while there were 5938 producers.

== Education, training and research in Agriculture ==
There are several vocational and higher education institutions devoted to the teaching of agricultural sciences in Portugal. Almost all state-run polytechnic institutes (there are 15 across the country), have a school of agriculture awarding bachelor's and master's degrees in the subject. The Escola Superior Agrária de Coimbra, belonging to the Polytechnical Institute of Coimbra, is the oldest polytechnic institution of agriculture. There is also a number of universities awarding bachelor's, masters' and doctorate degrees in varied agricultural science subfields. The Instituto Superior de Agronomia (ISA), the university school of agronomy of the Technical University of Lisbon, is among the oldest, largest and most prestigious in the country regarding both the teaching of agricultural sciences and research. Other public universities like the University of the Algarve and the University of Évora, have departments for both agronomy and agriculture, or related engineerings. The Instituto Nacional dos Recursos Biológicos (INRB) is the national research institute for agriculture and fisheries.

== See also ==
- Denominação de Origem Controlada
- Economy of Portugal
- Fishing in Portugal
- Portugal
