= Economy of Portugal =

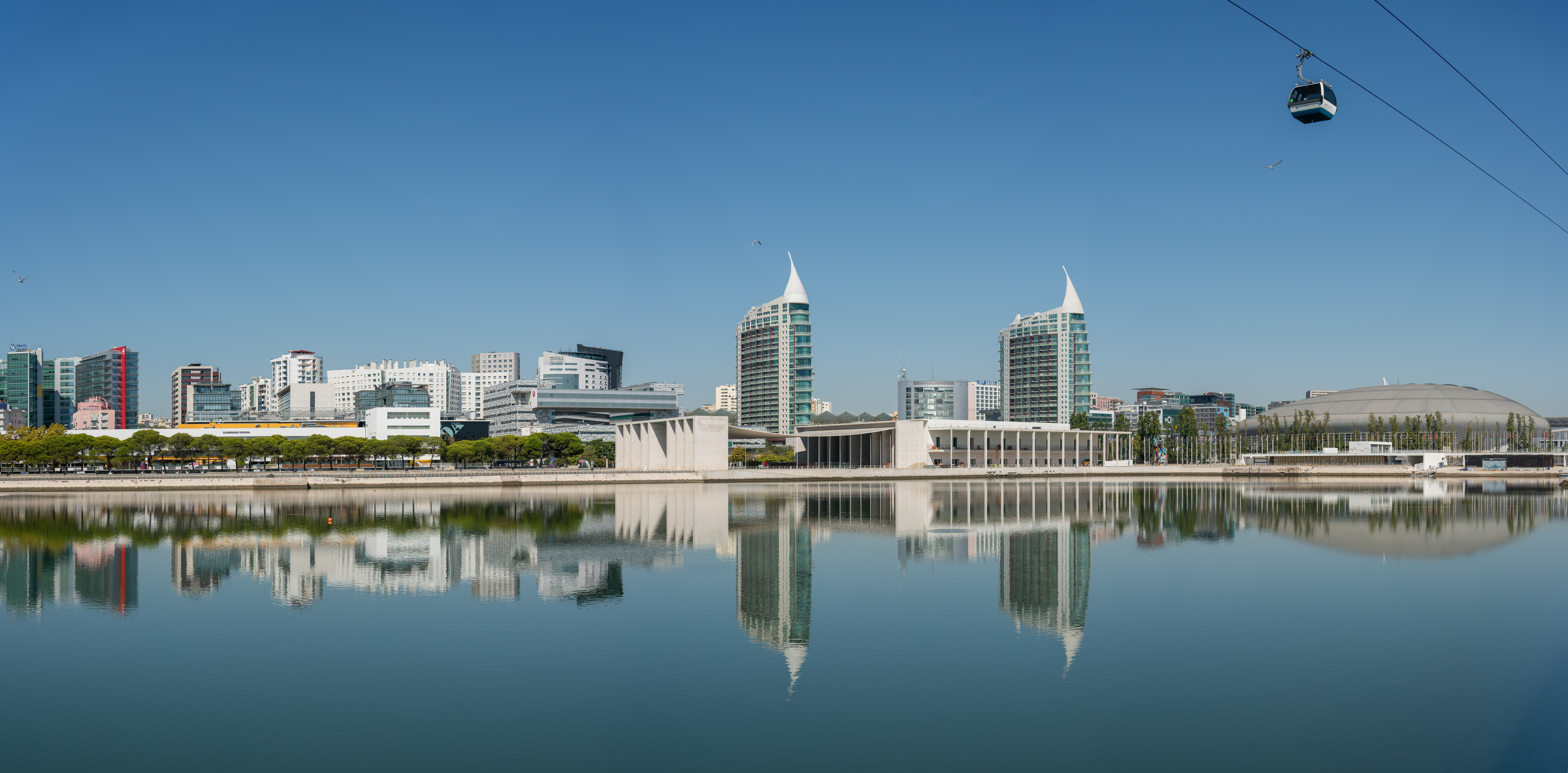
- Parque das Nações, Lisbon, 21st century Lisbon skyline
- Currency: Euro (EUR, €)
- Fiscal year: Calendar year
- Trade organisations: EU, WTO and OECD
- Country group: Advanced economy; High-income economy

Statistics
- Population: ▲11,424,031 (2025)
- GDP: ▲$375.197 billion (nominal; 2026); ▲$570.956 billion (PPP; 2026)
- GDP rank: 47th (nominal, 2026); 51st (PPP, 2026)
- GDP growth: 2.3% (2026f); 1.9% (2025); 2.7% (2024)
- GDP per capita: ▲$34,815 (nominal, 2026); ▲$52,980 (PPP, 2026)
- GDP per capita rank: 41st (nominal, 2026); 43rd (PPP, 2026)
- GDP per capita growth: 0.8% (2025)
- GDP by sector: agriculture: 2.2%; industry: 21.1%; services: 76.7% (2025)
- Inflation (CPI): 3.8% (Oct 2026); 2.3% (2025); 2.4% (2024)
- Population below national poverty line: ▼15.4% (2024); ▼18.6% at risk of poverty or social exclusion (2024); ▲40.7% at risk of poverty before social transfers (2024)
- Gini coefficient: ▼30.9 medium (2025)
- Human Development Index: ▲0.890 very high (2023) (40th); ▲0.795 high IHDI (40th) (2023)
- Corruption Perceptions Index: ▼56 out of 100 points (2025) (46th)
- Labour force: ▲5,707,700 (Q3 2026); ▲79.6% employment rate (2025)
- Labour force by occupation: agriculture: 2.4%; industry: 24.4%; services: 73.2% (2025)
- Unemployment: ▲5.5% (Q3 2026); ▲19.9% youth unemployment (16 to 24 year-olds; Q3 2026)
- Average gross salary: €1,882 / $2,121 monthly (2024)
- Average net salary: €1,412 / $1,591 monthly (2024)
- Main industries: textiles, clothing, footwear, wood and cork, paper, chemicals, auto-parts manufacturing, base metals, dairy products, wine and other foods, porcelain and ceramics, glassware, technology, telecommunications; ship construction and refurbishment; tourism, building materials

External
- Exports: ▲€134.634 billion (2025)
- Export goods: List: agricultural products, food products, oil products, chemical products, plastics and rubber, skins and leather, wood and cork, wood pulp and paper, textile materials, clothing, footwear, minerals and mineral products, base metals, machinery and tools, vehicles and other transport material, optical and precision instruments
- Main export partners: Spain 26.0%; Germany 13.9%; France 12.0%; US 5.8%; UK 4.5%; Italy 4.5%; Netherlands 3.3%; Belgium 2.6%
- Imports: ▲€130.885 billion (2025)
- Import goods: List: agricultural products, food products, oil products, chemical products, plastics and rubber, skins and leather, wood and cork, wood pulp and paper, textile materials, clothing, footwear, minerals and mineral products, base metals, machinery and tools, vehicles and other transport material, optical and precision instruments, computer accessories and parts, semi-conductors and related devices, household goods, passenger cars new and used, wine products
- Main import partners: Spain 32.9%; Germany 11.9%; France 7.3%; Netherlands 5.9%; China 5.3%; Italy 5.0%; Belgium 3.3%; Brazil 2.4%
- FDI stock: ▲3.5% of GDP (2025)
- Current account: ▼€1.4 billion (Sep 2026)
- Gross external debt: ▼€472.990 billion (Q3 2026)

Public finance
- Government debt: ▼89.2% of GDP (2025); ▲€275.075 billion (2025)
- Foreign reserves: ▲$68.84 billion (2025)
- Budget balance: €2.0 billion surplus (2025); +0.7% of GDP (2025)
- Revenue: 43.0% of GDP (2025)
- Spending: 42.3% of GDP (2025)
- Economic aid: €22 billion from European Structural and Investment Funds (2007–2013); €26 billion from European Structural and Investment Funds (2014–2020)
- Credit rating: Standard & Poor's: A+; Outlook: Stable; Moody's: A2; Outlook: Stable; Fitch: A+; Outlook: Stable; DBRS: A; Outlook: Positive; Scope: A+; Outlook: Stable
- All values, unless otherwise stated, are in US dollars.

The economy of Portugal is ranked 37th in the World Competitiveness Ranking 2025 by Swiss institute IMD. The large majority of the international trade is done within the European Union (EU), whose countries received 71.4% of the Portuguese exports and were the origin of 74.6% of the Portuguese imports in 2020.

The Portuguese currency is the euro (€) and the country has been a part of the Eurozone since its inception. Portugal's central bank is the Banco de Portugal, which forms part of the European System of Central Banks, and the major stock exchange is the Euronext Lisbon. Among OECD nations, Portugal has a social security system; social expenditure stood at roughly 24.6% of GDP.

The Portuguese economy had a GDP growth in 2025 of 1.9%, according to official data. The economic growth has been accompanied by a continuous fall in the unemployment rate (6% during 2025, compared with 13.9% registered in the end of 2014), with Portugal's unemployment rate remaining steady at 5.6% by September 2026, according to Statistics Portugal. Portugal registered a budget surplus of 0.7% of Gross Domestic Product (GDP) for the year 2025, reaching 2 billion euros, with public debt decreasing to 89.2% of GDP.

These rates mark an inversion from the negative trends caused by the impact of the 2008 financial crisis in the Portuguese economy that caused it to shrink for three consecutive years (2011, 2012, and 2013), accompanied by a high increase of the unemployment rate (that achieved a record of 17.7% in early 2013). The crisis had caused a wide range of domestic problems due to the levels of public deficit, as well as the excessive debt levels. The problems culminated in the confirmation from Portugal of a €78 billion financial bailout from the EU in April 2011, following similar decisions from Greece and the Republic of Ireland. The government that took office in June 2011 had to face tough choices in regard to its attempts to stimulate the economy while at the same time seeking to maintain its public deficit around the EU average.

Education in Portugal has been in gradual modernization and relative expansion since the 1960s, achieving recognition for its world-standard practices and trends in the 21st century. According to the Programme for International Student Assessment (PISA) 2015, the average Portuguese 15-year-old student, when rated in terms of reading literacy, mathematics and science knowledge, is placed significantly above the OECD's average. Portugal is home to several world class universities and business schools that have been contributing to the creation of a number of internationally recognized managers and are attracting an increasing number of foreign students. Portugal's emigration rate is high compared with the EU average. Around 1.8 million Portuguese people lived outside the country by 2024, mainly in Europe and America.

== History ==
=== Portuguese Colonial Empire ===
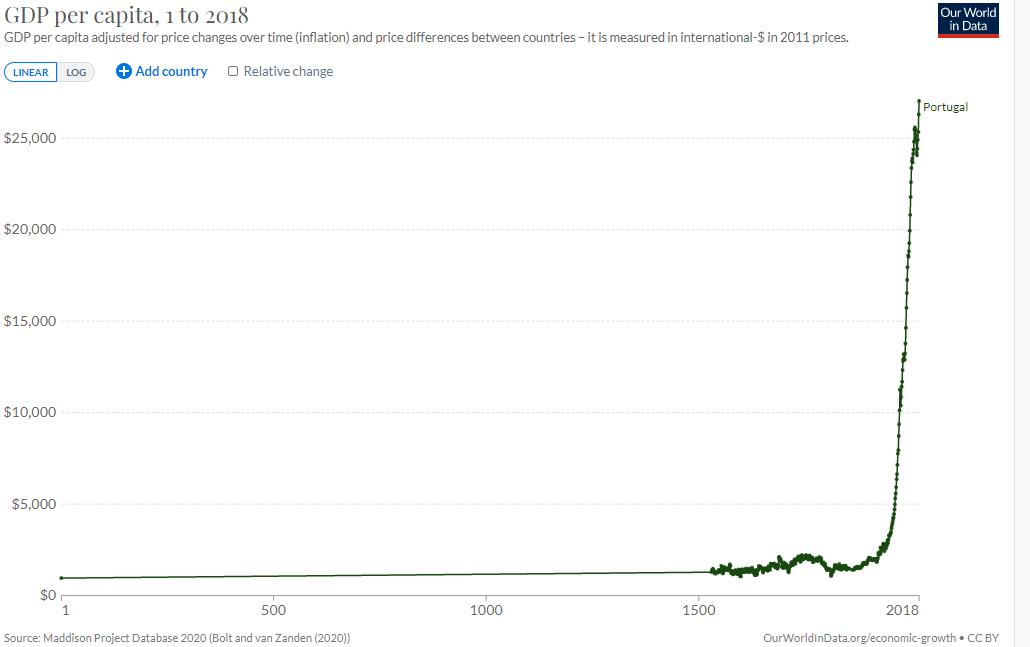
GDP per capita in Portugal throughout history

During the Portuguese Empire period, started in the 15th century, until the Carnation Revolution of 1974, the economy of Portugal was centered in trade and raw materials related activities within its vast colonial possessions, mainly in Asia (spices, silk, dyes, porcelain and gems), Africa (ivory, timber, oil, diamonds and slaves) and South America (sugar cane, dyes, woods, and gold).

Portugal’s GDP per capita was at or above the level of other Western European countries until it began to decline in the mid-18th century—a downturn that historians now attribute to a “Dutch Disease” effect from the influx of gold from Brazil, leading to diminished exports and deindustrialization. It would not recover until the 20th century.

In 1822, the Portuguese colony of Brazil became an independent country, however, until 1974, Portugal managed to preserve its colonies/overseas territories in Africa, which included Angola and Mozambique, territories that would experience reasonable rates of economic growth until the departure of the Portuguese in 1975.

The economy of Portugal and its overseas territories on the eve of the Carnation Revolution (a military coup on 25 April 1974) was growing. Average family purchasing power was rising together with new consumption patterns and trends and this was promoting both investment in new capital equipment and consumption expenditure for durable and nondurable consumer goods. The Estado Novo regime economic policy encouraged and created conditions for the formation of large business conglomerates.

The regime maintained a policy of corporatism that resulted in the placement of a large part of the Portuguese economy in the hands of a number of strong conglomerates, of which, the most important were known as the "seven magnificent". These Portuguese conglomerates had a business model with similarities to South Korean chaebols and Japanese keiretsus and zaibatsus. Among the biggest conglomerates were those founded and held by the families Champalimaud, Mello (CUF group), Amorim and Santos (Jerónimo Martins group).

The CUF (Companhia União Fabril) group was the largest and most diversified of the Portuguese conglomerates. At one point, it became the largest industrial group in the Iberian Peninsula and one of the five largest in Europe. Its core businesses included the cement, chemicals, petrochemicals, agrochemicals, textiles, beer, beverages, metallurgy, naval engineering, electrical engineering, insurance, banking, paper, tourism and mining. Its main business activities and corporate headquarters located in mainland Portugal, but it also included branches, plants and several developing business projects all around the Portuguese overseas territories, especially in Angola and Mozambique.

Other medium-sized family companies specialized in textiles (for instance those located in the city of Covilhã and the northwest), ceramics, porcelain, glass and crystal (like those of Alcobaça, Caldas da Rainha and Marinha Grande), engineered wood (like SONAE near Porto), canned fish (like those of Algarve and the northwest which included one of the oldest canned fish companies in continuous operation in the world), fishing, food and beverage producing, tourism (well established in Estoril/Cascais/Sintra (the Portuguese Riviera) and growing as an international attraction in the Algarve since the 1960s) and in agriculture and agribusiness (like the ones scattered around Ribatejo and Alentejo – known as the breadbasket of Portugal, as well as the notorious Cachão Agroindustrial Complex established in Mirandela, Northern Portugal, in 1963) completed the panorama of the national economy by the early 1970s. In addition, rural areas' populations were committed to agrarianism that was of great importance for a majority of the total population, with many families living exclusively from agriculture or complementing their salaries with farming, husbandry and forestry yields.

The overseas territories of Angola and Mozambique (the largest Portuguese Overseas Provinces at the time) were internationally notable centres of production of oil, coffee, cotton, cashew, coconut, timber, minerals (like diamonds), metals (like iron and aluminium), banana, citrus, tea, sisal, beer, cement, fish and other sea products, beef and textiles.

Labour unions were not allowed and a minimum wage policy was not enforced. However, in a context of an expanding economy, bringing better living conditions for the Portuguese population in the 1960s, the outbreak of the colonial wars in Africa set off significant social changes, among them the rapid incorporation of more and more women into the labour market. Marcelo Caetano moved on to foster economic growth and some social improvements, such as the awarding of a monthly pension to rural workers who had never had the chance to pay social security.

The objectives of Caetano's pension reform were threefold: enhancing equity, reducing fiscal and actuarial imbalance, and achieving more efficiency for the economy as a whole, for example, by establishing contributions less distortive to labour markets or by allowing the savings generated by pension funds to increase the investments in the economy.

=== 1974 ===
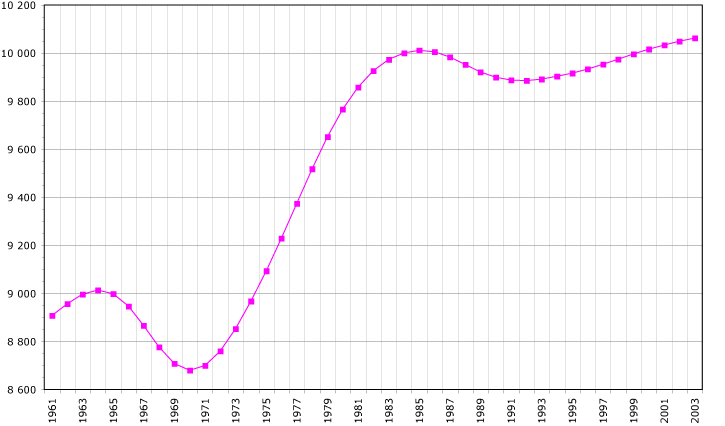
Portuguese population 1961–2003, in thousands (2005 Data from FAO), with emigration giving way to retornados ranging from 500,000 to 1 million after the revolution

The post Carnation Revolution period was characterized by chaos and negative economic growth as industries were nationalised and the negative effects of the decoupling of Portugal from its former colonies were felt. Heavy industry came to an abrupt halt. All sectors of the economy from manufacturing, mining, chemical, defence, finance, agriculture and fishing went into free fall.

Portugal experienced several years of negative growth. This was amplified by the mass emigration of skilled workers and entrepreneurs due to political intimidation, and the costs of accommodating in Portugal thousands of refugees from the former overseas provinces in Africa – the retornados.

After the Carnation Revolution's turmoil of 1974, the Portuguese economic basis changed deeply. The Portuguese economy had changed significantly by 1973 prior to the leftist military coup, compared with its position in 1961 – total output (GDP at factor cost) had grown by 120 percent in real terms. After the Carnation Revolution military coup of 1974, by abandoning its moderate-reformist, pro-democracy posture, the Movimento das Forças Armadas leadership set out on a course of sweeping nationalizations and land expropriations during a period known as PREC. Wide powers were handed over to the working class always having the concept of dictatorship of the proletariat in mind.

In 1960, Portugal's per capita GDP was only 38 percent of the EC-12 average. After Salazar's late shift in economic policy toward a more outward-looking, economically liberal direction due to the influence of a new generation of technocrats with background in economics and technical-industrial know-how, by the end of the Salazar period, in 1968, it had risen to 48 percent; and in 1973, on the eve of the revolution, Portugal's per capita GDP had reached 56.4 percent of the EC-12 average. In 1975, the year of maximum revolutionary turmoil, Portugal's per capita GDP declined to 52.3 percent of the EC-12 average. Convergence of real GDP growth toward the EC average occurred as a result of Portugal's economic resurgence since 1985. In 1991 Portugal's GDP per capita climbed to 54.9 percent of the EC average, exceeding by a fraction the level attained just during the worst revolutionary period. Portugal overtook Greece in terms of GDP per capita in 1992, but fell again below it in 1993. This situation endured until 2013 when Greece was more hardly hit by economic fallout from debt crisis.

The growth rate of Portuguese merchandise exports during the period 1959 to 1973 was notable – 11 percent per annum. In 1960 the bulk of exports was accounted for by a few products – canned fish, raw and manufactured cork, cotton textiles, and wine. By contrast, in the early 1970s (before the 1974 military coup), Portugal's export list reflected significant product diversification, including both consumer and capital goods. Several branches of Portuguese industry became export-oriented, and in 1973 over one-fifth of Portuguese manufactured output was exported.

There was a 16-percentage-point increase in the participation of the services sector from 39 percent of GDP in 1973 to 55.5 percent in 1990. Most of this growth reflected the exacerbated proliferation of civil service employment and the associated cost of public administration, together with the contribution of tourism services during the 1980s to the detriment of more sustainable and reproductive activities like manufacturing, exporting and technology/capital-intensive industries.

=== EU membership (1986) ===
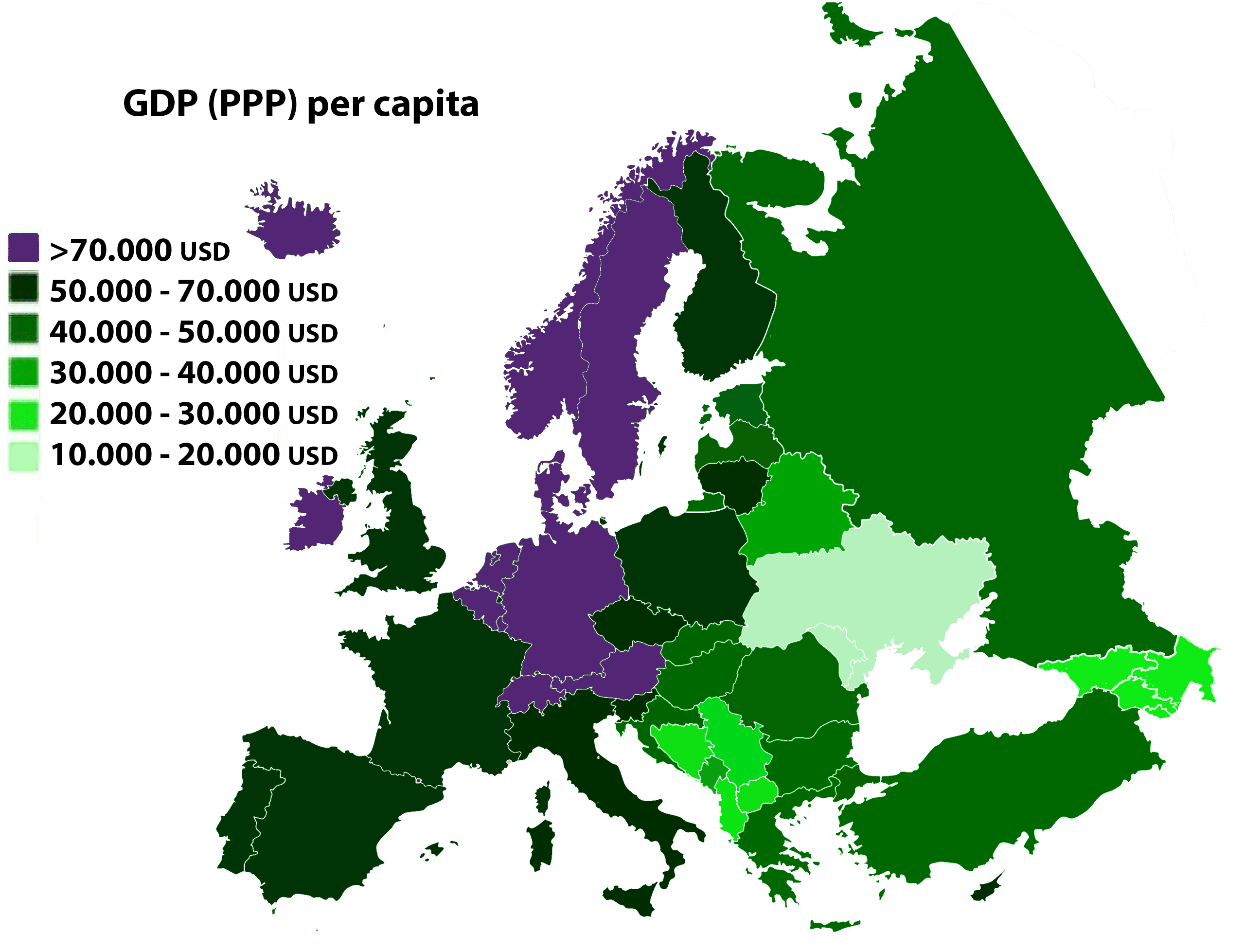
European GDP (PPP) per capita in 2024. Figures from the World Bank.

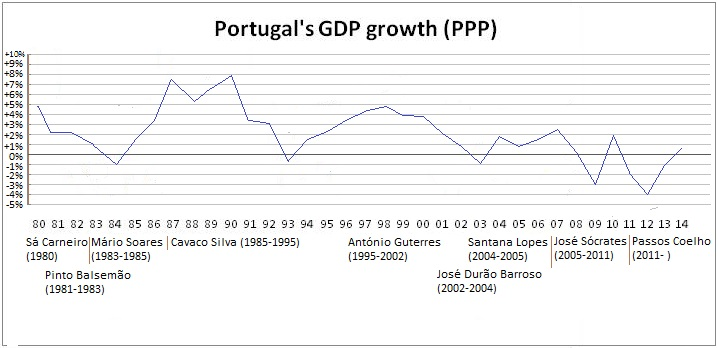
Portugal's GDP growth evolution (PPP) from 1980 to 2014

Membership in the European Communities, achieved in 1986, contributed to stable economic growth and development, largely through increased trade ties and an inflow of funds allocated by the European Union (and before that the European Communities) to improve the country's infrastructure.

Although the occurrence of economic growth and a public debt relatively well-contained as a result of the number of civil servants has been increased from 485,368 in 1988 to 509,732 in 1991, which was a much lower increase than that which will happen in the following years until 2005 marked by irrational and unsustainable State employment, from 1988 to 1993, during the government cabinets led by then Prime Minister Aníbal Cavaco Silva, the Portuguese economy was radically changed. As a result, there was a sharp and rapid decrease in the output of tradable goods and a rise of the importance of the non-tradable goods sector in the Portuguese economy. After a recession in 1993, the economy grew at an average annual rate of 3.3%.

In order to qualify for the Economic and Monetary Union (EMU), Portugal agreed to cut its fiscal deficit and undertake structural reforms. The EMU brought to Portugal exchange rate stability, falling inflation, and falling interest rates. Falling interest rates, in turn, lowered the cost of public debt and helped the country achieve its fiscal targets.

In 1999, it continued to enjoy sturdy economic growth, falling interest rates, and low unemployment. The country qualified for the Economic and Monetary Union of the European Union (EMU) in 1998 and joined with 10 other European countries in launching the euro on 1 January 1999. The three different designs chosen for the national side of the Portuguese euro coins were drawn by the artist Vitor Manuel Fernandes dos Santos. The inspiration came from the three seals of the first king, Dom Afonso Henriques. Portugal's inflation rate for 1999, 2.3%, was comfortably low.

Household debt expanded rapidly. The European Commission, OECD, and others advised the Portuguese Government to exercise more fiscal restraint. Portugal's public deficit exceeded 3% of GNP in 2001, the EU's self-imposed limit, and left the country open to either EU sanctions or tighter financial supervision. The overall rate of growth slowed in late 2001 and into 2002, making fiscal austerity that much more painful to implement.

Portugal made significant progress in raising its standard of living to that of its EU partners. GDP per capita on a purchasing power parity basis rose from 51% of the EU average in 1985 to 78% in early 2002. By 2005 this had dropped to 72% (of the average across all of now 25 EU members, including seven with GDP per capita lower than Portugal) as GDP per capita rose in other EU countries. Unemployment stood at 4.1% at the end of 2001, which was low compared to the EU average.

GDP growth in 2006, at 1.3%, was the lowest not just in the European Union but in all of Europe. In the 2000s, the Czech Republic, Malta and Slovenia overtook Portugal in terms of GDP per capita. From 2010 until 2012, GDP per capita (PPP) in Portugal fell below those of Slovakia (in Europe) and Seychelles (outside Europe). In 2013 it was estimated that the Portuguese GDP per capita will be similar (within minus or plus US$1,000 per capita) of those of Greece, Estonia and Lithuania. The GDP per capita fell from just over 80% of the EU 25 average in 1999 to just over 70% in 2007. This poor performance of the Portuguese economy was explored in April 2007 by The Economist which described Portugal as "a new sick man of Europe".

From 2002 to 2007, the unemployment rate increased 65% (270,500 unemployed citizens in 2002, 448,600 unemployed citizens in 2007). In December 2009, ratings agency Standard and Poor's lowered its long-term credit assessment of Portugal to "negative" from "stable", voicing pessimism on the country's structural weaknesses in the economy and weak competitiveness that would hamper growth and the capacity to strengthen its public finances and reduce debt.

However, the Portuguese subsidiaries of large multinational companies ranked among the most productive in the world, including Siemens Portugal, Volkswagen Autoeuropa, Qimonda Portugal (before the parent company filed for bankruptcy), IKEA, Nestlé Portugal, Microsoft Portugal, Unilever/Jerónimo Martins and Danone Portugal.

Many Portuguese companies have grown and expanded internationally since after 1986. Among the most notable Portugal-based global companies are SONAE, Amorim, Sogrape, EFACEC, Portugal Telecom, Jerónimo Martins, Cimpor, Unicer, Millennium bcp, Lactogal, Sumol + Compal, Delta Cafés, Derovo, Critical Software, Galp Energia, EDP, Grupo José de Mello, Sovena Group, Valouro, Renova, Teixeira Duarte, Soares da Costa, Portucel Soporcel, Simoldes, Iberomoldes, Logoplaste and TAP Portugal

=== Portuguese financial crisis (2010–2013) ===
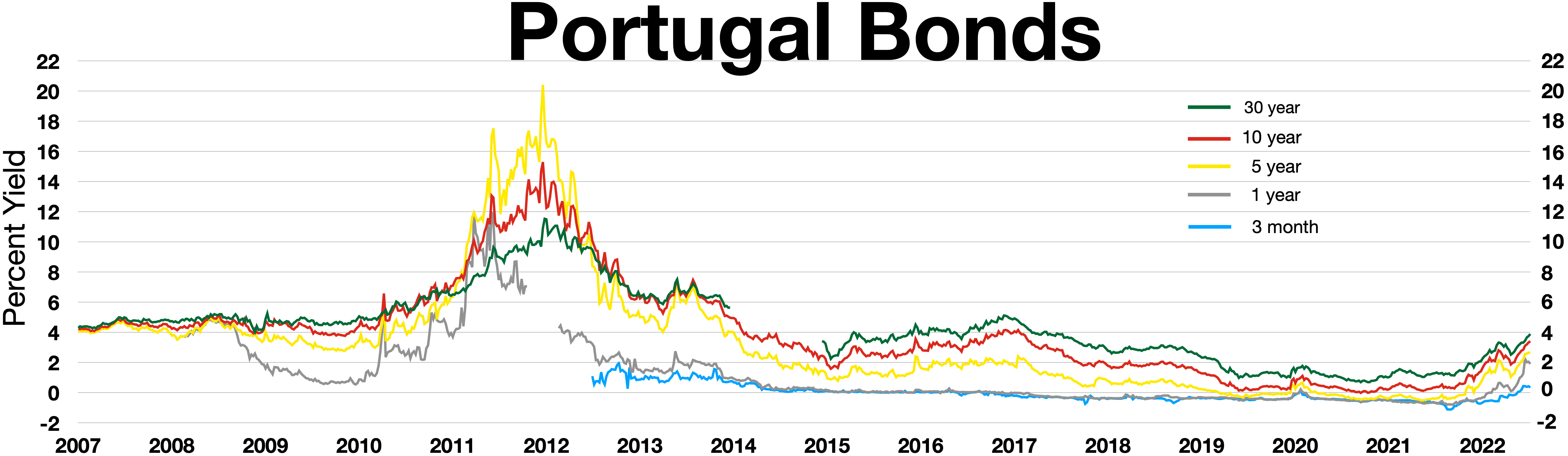
Portugal bonds during Portuguese financial crisis 30 year bond 10 year bond 5 year bond 1 year bond 3 month bond

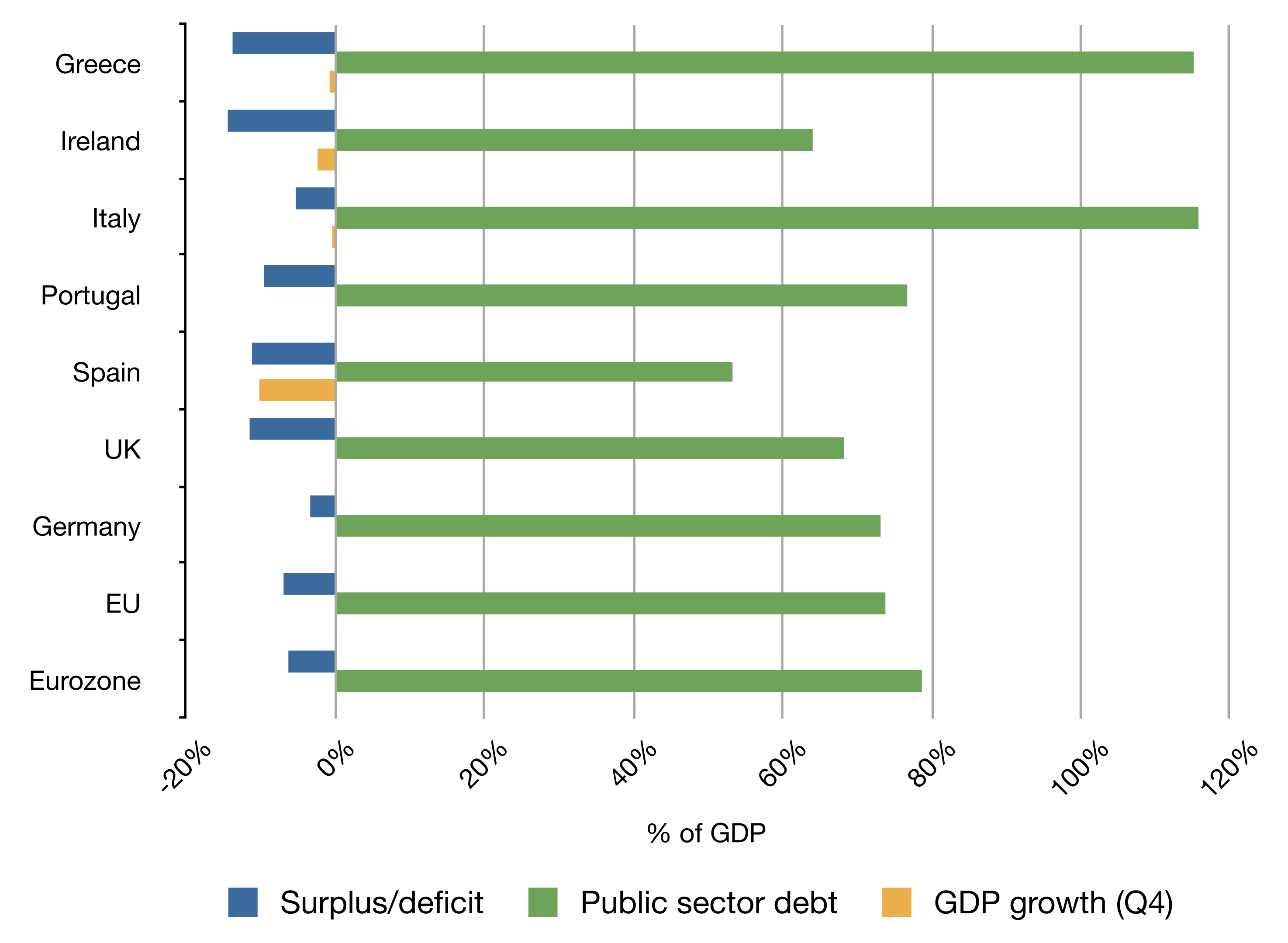
Graph showing the economic data (Surplus/deficit, Public sector debt, GDP growth) of Portugal, the EU and the eurozone for 2009, from Eurostat

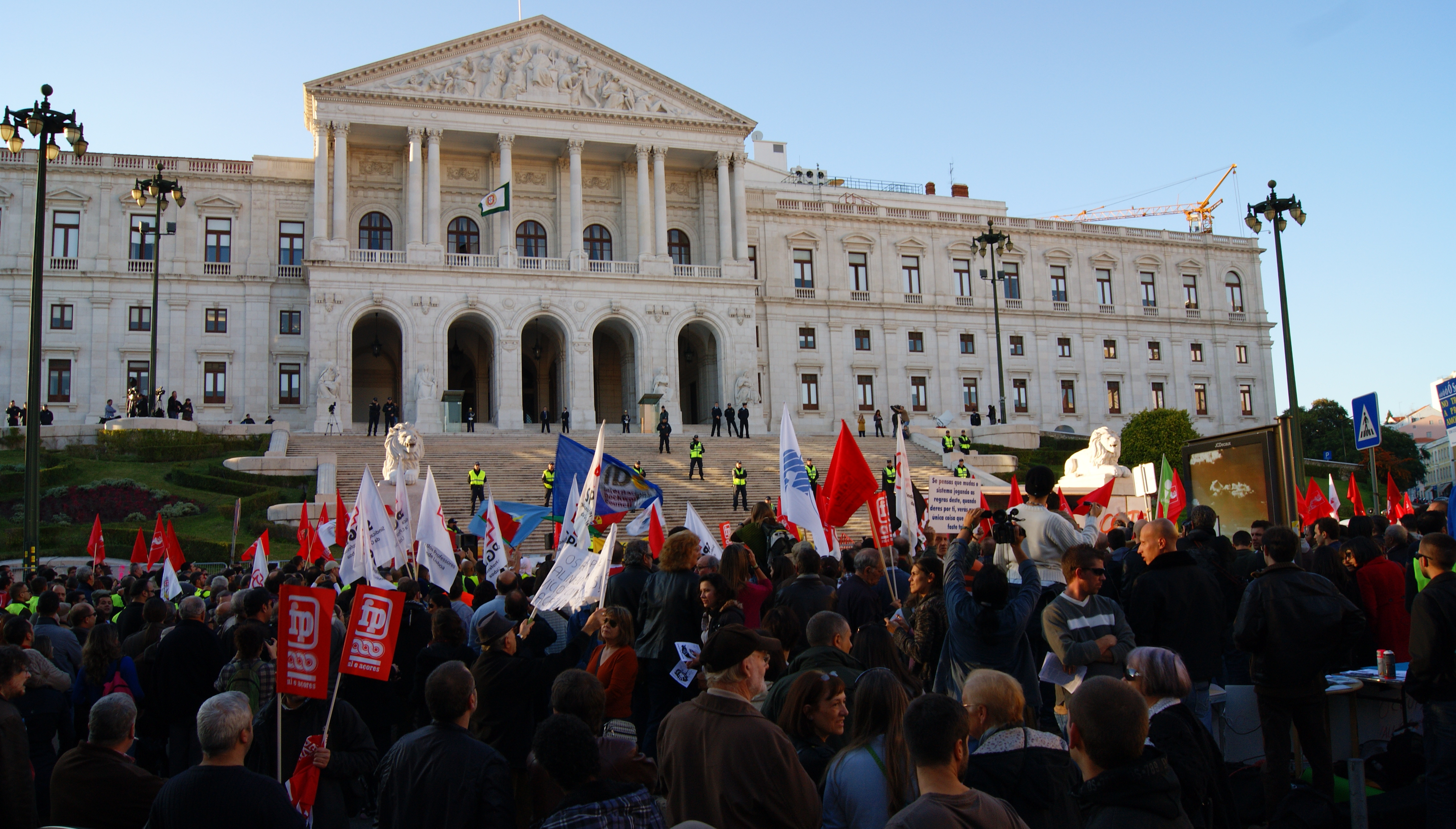
November 2011 protests against austerity measures of the Economic Adjustment Programme for Portugal outside the Assembly of the Republic

The Portuguese Financial crisis was a major political and economic crisis, related with the European sovereign debt crisis and its heavy impact in Portugal. The crisis started to be noted in the initial weeks of 2010 and only began to fade away with the start of the Portuguese economic recovery in the late 2013. It was the Portuguese economy's most severe recession since the 1970s.

A report published in January 2011 by the Diário de Notícias, a leading Portuguese newspaper, demonstrated that during the period of the Carnation Revolution, from 1974 to 2010, the Portuguese democratic governments have encouraged over-expenditure and investment bubbles through unclear public-private partnerships. Consequently, numerous ineffective external consultancy/advising committees and firms were funded, and this facilitated considerable slippage in state-managed public works, inflated top management and head officers' bonuses and wages. Additionally, a recruitment policy eventuated that has boosted the number of redundant public servants.

For almost four decades, the nation's economy has also been damaged by risky credit, public debt creation, and mismanaged European structural and cohesion funds. Apparently, Prime Minister Sócrates's cabinet was unable to forecast or prevent the crisis when symptoms first appeared in 2005, and was later incapable of doing anything to ameliorate the situation when the country was on the verge of bankruptcy in 2011. In 2010, acronyms like PIIGS were widely used by international bond analysts, academics, and the international financial press when referring to the underperforming economies of Portugal, Italy, Ireland, Greece and Spain. The number of civil servants had increased from 509,732 to 727,701 between 1991 and 2011.

Four factors that heavily contributed to the financial crisis were:

- The financial collapse of Banco Português de Negócios (BPN) due to a huge amount of toxic credits conceded by the bank in exchange of promises of illegal gains to the administrators, like corporate positions or the acquisitions of assets previously detained by them. The government nationalized the bank in November 2008 and, according to the BPN Inquiry Commission, until 2012, the nationalization of the bank cost 3405 million Euros to the State. In 2010 alone, the bank had an impact of 1803 million Euros in the public accounts, which was equivalent to 1.2% of the GDP.
- The bankruptcy of the bank Banco Privado Português (BPP), which entailed large costs for the State. This bank was dissolved by Banco de Portugal in April 2010. In 2010 alone, the BPP cost 450 million euros to the taxpayers, consisting in guarantees driven by the State in that year.
- The budgetary slippage with the Public–private partnerships (PPPs): between 2008 and 2010 the accounts slipped 560.2 million euros, mainly due to the rents paid to road concessions, to which were paid more 425.5 million euros than it was budgeted. In 2011 the slippage in the rents with the road concessions rose 28% to 197.4 million euros above what was budgeted and rose 42.3% to 266.3 million euros above what had been forecasted for 2010. The State spent a total of 896.6 million euros in rents to the road concessions. The rents paid to the PPPs in the health and rail sectors also slipped considerably.
- The Swaps contracted by State-owned businesses with potential losses higher than 3000 million euros. In 2013, the Portuguese government reserved 898 million euros in the Amending Government Budget to bear the costs of the settlement of these contracts, so those companies can pay the accumulated losses to the financial institutions with which they contracted those swaps. The recipient firms of that support are the Lisbon Metro (548 million euros), the Porto Metro (315 million euros), REFER, whose administrator in the time when those contracts were approved is the former Finance Minister of Portugal, Maria Luís Albuquerque (20 million euros) and Estradas de Portugal (15 million euros).

In April 2011, Portugal confirmed the receipt of a financial bailout from the IMF and the European Union worth €78 billion ($115 billion, £70 billion), following Greece and the Republic of Ireland. Some senior German policymakers publicly stated that emergency bailouts for Greece and future EU aid recipients should be accompanied by harsh penalties, which caused social unrest in Ireland and across Southern European countries, germanophobia, a big increase of euroscepticism and the rise of far-left and far-right parties in Greece (namely SYRIZA, Golden Dawn, among others), as well as the eurosceptic Five Star Movement and Lega Nord in Italy.

In May 2007, 65% of the Portuguese tended to trust the EU institutions while 24% tended not to trust them. On the other hand, in November 2012, only 34% tended to trust them, while 59% tended not to trust them (even so, less extreme than Greece or Spain, where 81% and 72% tended not to trust them, respectively). Partly as a result of this disappointed attitude concerning the EU, Portugal has started to close ties with Africa, Brazil as well as with other Latin American countries, China, USA, Switzerland and other parts of the world, which has been reflected both in the investments, in foreign trade, and even in emigration.

The three-year EU aid program incorporating the €78 billion support package ended in May 2014. At the time the Portuguese government reaffirmed its commitment to continue its economic reform, declaring that while the bailout had allowed the country to put its economy back on track, it still faced significant challenges.

=== Resumption of Portuguese economic growth (2014–present) ===
The year of 2014 marked the start of the recovery of the Portuguese economy. Since the third quarter of 2014, the Portuguese economy has been steadily expanding, with a GDP growth of 0.4% quarterly and 1.5% yearly registered in the second quarter of 2015. The economic recovery has been accompanied by a continuous fall in the unemployment rate (8.5% in the third quarter of 2017, from a high of 17% in 2012). The Government budget deficit has also been reduced from the 11.2% of GDP in 2010 to 4.8% in 2014.

The International Monetary Fund issued an update report in late June 2017 with some positive news including a stronger near-term outlook and an increase in investments and exports. Because of a surplus in 2016, the country was no longer bound by the Excessive Deficit Procedure. The banking system was more stable, although there were still non-performing loans and corporate debt. The IMF recommended working on solving these problems for Portugal to be able to attract more private investment. "Sustained strong growth, together with continued public debt reduction, would reduce vulnerabilities arising from high indebtedness, particularly when monetary accommodation is reduced."

By 2021, Portugal's GDP (PPP) was $36,381 per capita, according to OECD's report. It was the 4th lowest GDP per capita (PPP) of the eurozone out of 19 members, and the 8th lowest of the European Union out of 27 member-states, with several former economically disadvantaged Communist Bloc countries which in the meanwhile had become Eastern European member-states of the EU, nearly reaching or surpassing Portugal in terms of GDP (PPP) per capita around this date. Also in 2021, labour productivity (PPP) was the fifth lowest among the 27 member-states of the European Union (EU) and was 35% lower than the EU average. By 2022, the Portuguese productivity of labour had fallen to the fourth lowest position among the 27 member-states of the European Union with only Bulgaria and Greece being clearly inferior to Portugal in that parameter.

At this stage, Portugal had been a net beneficiary to the European Union budget since it joined the union, then known as EEC, in 1986.

Portugal's GDP growth rate recorded the highest increase in the EU for the fourth quarter of 2024 as a percentage change compared with the previous quarter of 2024, according to Eurostat, with +1.5%. Moreover, while GDP per capita increased in 21 out of 27 countries across Europe, Portugal ranked 5th with an increase in the quarterly real GDP per capita of 0.68% in 2024.

Portugal also ranks 2nd highest growth in household income rising by 6.7% and therefore surpassing the OECD average of 0.9%. According to the figures published in January 2024, by Banco de Portugal, Portugal’s Central Bank, Portugal's debt-to-GDP ratio is declining. Portugal’s total net debt vis-à-vis the rest of the world decreased from 85.4% of GDP in June 2023 to 82.7% of GDP in September 2023.

Portugal’s budget surplus exceeded forecasts by 1 billion euros for the year 2023. Portugal achieved a historic budget surplus of 1.2% of the Gross Domestic Product (GDP) for the year 2023, exceeding the target of 0.8% that was expected to reach 2,191 million euros. The country also ranks 6th EU country with the highest Gold Reserves by value in euros in 2025, since in Q4 2024, the country holds 382.66 tonnes of gold valued at nearly 35 billion euros.

== Data ==
GDP growth %

View source data.

GDP per capita (in US$ PPP)

View source data.

The following table shows the main economic indicators in 1980–2025 (with IMF staff estimates between 2026–2031 in italics). Inflation below 5% is in green.

Year	GDP (in bn. US$PPP)	GDP per capita (in US$ PPP)	GDP (in bn. US$nominal)	GDP per capita (in US$ nominal)	GDP growth (real)	Inflation rate (in Percent)	Unemployment (in Percent)	Government debt (in % of GDP)
1980	63.5	6,503.6	32.6	3,338.8	▲6.7%	▲5.9%	7.8%	n/a
1981	▲72.0	▲7,306.1	▼32.5	▼3,296.7	▲3.5%	▲21.2%	▲8.3%	n/a
1982	▲78.1	▲7,877.1	▼30.7	▼3,095.1	▲2.2%	▲22.7%	▼7.5%	n/a
1983	▲81.9	▲8,226.8	▼28.3	▼2,838.7	▲1.0%	▲25.1%	▲7.9%	n/a
1984	▲84.0	▲8,402.6	▼26.0	▼2,596.1	▼-1.0%	▲29.3%	▲10.5%	n/a
1985	▲88.1	▲8,786.0	▲27.2	▲2,716.6	▲1.6%	▼19.3%	▼8.7%	n/a
1986	▲92.8	▲9,252.1	▲37.9	▲3,774.6	▲3.3%	▼11.7%	▼8.6%	n/a
1987	▲102.4	▲10,207.7	▲47.4	▲4,724.5	▲7.6%	▼9.4%	▼7.1%	n/a
1988	▲111.7	▲11,143.6	▲55.4	▲5,532.6	▲5.3%	▲9.6%	▼7.1%	n/a
1989	▲123.7	▲12,368.6	▲59.8	▲5,977.6	▲6.6%	▲12.6%	▼5.1%	n/a
1990	▲138.5	▲13,870.2	▲79.4	▲7,957.3	▲7.9%	▲13.4%	▼4.2%	60.2%
1991	▲148.0	▲14,856.7	▲89.9	▲9,026.3	▲3.4%	▼11.4%	▼4.1%	▲63.9%
1992	▲156.1	▲15,683.1	▲108.1	▲10,863.5	▲3.1%	▼8.9%	▼3.9%	▼58.1%
1993	▲158.7	▲15,925.0	▼95.1	▼9,547.7	▼-0.7%	▲5.9%	▲5.1%	▼57.2%
1994	▲164.5	▲16,462.9	▲99.7	▲9,977.6	▲1.5%	▼5.0%	▲6.3%	▲60.4%
1995	▲171.8	▲17,136.4	▲118.2	▲11,787.3	▲2.3%	▼4.0%	▲7.9%	▲62.2%
1996	▲181.1	▲17,993.9	▲122.7	▲12,187.5	▲3.5%	▼2.9%	▲8.0%	▲63.3%
1997	▲192.3	▲19,024.6	▼117.2	▼11,594.8	▲4.4%	▼1.9%	▼7.5%	▼58.7%
1998	▲203.8	▲20,061.7	▲124.1	▲12,216.7	▲4.8%	▲2.2%	▼5.7%	▼55.6%
1999	▲214.8	▲21,021.2	▲127.6	▲12,487.7	▲3.9%	▲2.2%	▼5.2%	▼55.4%
2000	▲228.0	▲22,161.4	▼118.7	▼11,531.5	▲3.8%	▲2.8%	▼4.7%	▼54.2%
2001	▲237.7	▲22,938.5	▲121.6	▲11,734.9	▲1.9%	▲4.4%	▲4.8%	▲57.4%
2002	▲243.3	▲23,346.4	▲134.7	▲12,927.5	▲0.8%	▼3.7%	▲5.8%	▲60.0%
2003	▲245.8	▲23,497.4	▲165.2	▲15,793.8	▼-0.9%	▼3.2%	▲7.0%	▲63.9%
2004	▲256.9	▲24,502.1	▲189.3	▲18,056.0	▲1.8%	▼2.5%	▲7.4%	▲67.1%
2005	▲267.0	▲25,420.8	▲197.4	▲18,790.5	▲0.8%	▼2.1%	▲8.3%	▲72.2%
2006	▲279.7	▲26,582.7	▲208.8	▲19,840.5	▲1.6%	▲3.0%	▲8.4%	▲73.7%
2007	▲294.5	▲27,932.3	▲240.5	▲22,813.8	▲2.5%	▼2.4%	▲8.7%	▼72.7%
2008	▲301.1	▲28,520.1	▲263.4	▲24,946.3	▲0.3%	▲2.7%	▼8.3%	▲75.5%
2009	▼293.5	▼27,773.7	▼244.4	▼23,126.1	▼-3.1%	▼-0.9%	▲10.2%	▲87.6%
2010	▲302.2	▲28,586.6	▼238.6	▼22,570.4	▲1.7%	▲1.4%	▲11.5%	▲99.9%
2011	▲303.2	▲28,672.5	▲245.4	▲23,205.1	▼-1.7%	▲3.6%	▲13.6%	▲114.0%
2012	▼296.3	▼28,138.0	▼216.7	▼20,574.0	▼-4.1%	▼2.8%	▲16.6%	▲128.6%
2013	▲298.4	▲28,490.7	▲226.7	▲21,642.2	▼-1.0%	▼0.4%	▲17.2%	▲130.8%
2014	▲305.9	▲29,354.2	▲230.1	▲22,087.0	▲0.7%	▼-0.2%	▼14.5%	▲132.5%
2015	▲313.6	▲30,207.1	▼199.1	▼19,173.7	▲1.6%	▲0.5%	▼12.9%	▼131.0%
2016	▲322.9	▲31,181.3	▲206.2	▲19,914.9	▲2.0%	▲0.6%	▼11.3%	▲131.2%
2017	▲339.6	▲32,843.8	▲220.8	▲21,352.3	▲3.3%	▲1.6%	▼9.2%	▼126.0%
2018	▲358.9	▲34,725.2	▲242.2	▲23,436.0	▲2.9%	▼1.2%	▼7.2%	▼121.1%
2019	▲389.5	▲37,616.2	▼240.1	▼23,192.2	▲2.7%	▼0.3%	▼6.7%	▼116.1%
2020	▼370.4	▼35,662.8	▼229.4	▼22,093.3	▼-8.2%	▼-0.1%	▲7.1%	▲134.1%
2021	▲402.7	▲38,690.8	▲256.2	▲24,618.9	▲5.6%	▲0.9%	▼6.7%	▼123.9%
2022	▲461.6	▲44,090.6	▼257.1	▼24,558.6	▲7.0%	▲8.1%	▼6.2%	▼111.2%
2023	▲493.7	▲46,674.4	▲292.4	▲27,642.6	▲3.1%	▼5.3%	▲6.6%	▼96.9%
2024	▲517.6	▲48,397.0	▲313.6	▲29,319.5	▲2.2%	▼2.7%	▼6.5%	▼93.5%
2025	▲541.1	▲50,082.8	▲346.4	▲32,064.1	▲1.9%	▼2.2%	▼6.0%	▼89.7%
2026	▲571.0	▲52,980.0	▲375.2	▲34,815.2	▲2.1%	▲3.2%	▼5.9%	▼85.1%
2027	▲600.0	▲55,816.8	▲393.6	▲36,617.7	▲1.9%	▼3.0%	5.9%	▼81.0%
2028	▲623.7	▲58,167.3	▲409.3	▲38,176.3	▲1.8%	▼2.1%	▼5.8%	▼77.9%
2029	▲646.3	▲60,400.3	▲425.8	▲39,786.8	▲1.7%	▼2.1%	▼5.7%	▼75.3%
2030	▲669.2	▲62,665.5	▲442.3	▲41,420.0	▲1.7%	▼1.9%	5.7%	▼73.4%
2031	▲691.7	▲64,897.7	▲457.9	▲42,961.4	▲1.6%	▲1.9%	5.7%	▼72.0%

== Government sector ==
=== Government expenditure by function ===
According to Eurostat in 2024, the General Government expenditure by main function, as a percentage of Total Expenditure, was as follows (compared to the Eurozone and EU averages):

Function	Portugal	Eurozone	EU
Social Protection	40.4%	40.7%	40.0%
Health	16.1%	15.1%	15.0%
General Public Services	13.7%	12.5%	12.4%
Education	10.3%	9.4%	9.7%
Economic affairs	8.5%	10.6%	10.8%
Public order and safety	3.9%	3.4%	3.5%
Recreation, culture and religion	2.0%	2.3%	2.4%
Defence	2.1%	2.8%	3.0%
Environmental protection	1.6%	1.7%	1.7%
Housing and community amenities	1.4%	1.5%	1.5%

Also according to Eurostat in 2024, the General Government expenditure by three of the main functions, as a percentage of GDP, was as follows (compared to the Eurozone and EU averages):

Function	Portugal	Eurozone	EU
Social Protection	17.1%	20.1%	19.6%
Health	6.8%	7.5%	7.3%
General Public Services	5.8%	6.1%	6.1%

Detailed description of the functions described above
Government broad objective (division)	Sub-Items
Social Protection	Sickness and disability, old age, survivors, family and children, unemployment, housing, R&D, social exclusion, social protection, non-specified
General Public Services	Executive and legislative organs, financial and fiscal affairs, external affairs foreign economic aid, basic research, R&D related to general public services, public debt services, transfers of a general character between different levels of government
Economic Affairs	General economic, labour and commercial affairs, agriculture, forestry, fishing and hunting, fuel and energy, mining, manufacturing and construction, transport, communication, other industries, related R&D
Health	Medical products, appliances and equipment, outpatient, hospital and public health service, R&D related to health
Education	Pre-primary, primary, secondary and tertiary education, post-secondary non-tertiary education, education nondefinable by level, subsidiary services to education, R&D
Public Order and Safety	Police, fire-protection services, law courts, prisons, R&D related to public order and safety
Defense	Military and civil defense, foreign military aid, R&D related to defense
Recreation, Culture and Religion	Recreational and sporting, cultural services, broadcasting and publishing services, religious and other community services, R&D
Housing and Community Amenities	Housing development, community development, water supply, street lighting, R&D related
Environmental Protection	Waste and water waste management, pollution abatement, protection of biodiversity and landscape, related R&D

According to these data, in 2024, Portugal did not present any overspending neither on the coverage of social risks (social protection and health) and the slightly high spending on education can be related to a lag between the average qualifications of Portuguese and their European counterparts, resulting in an eventual attempt to overcome that lag. There has been significant progress towards that objective, since the school dropout rate fell from 43.6% in 2000 to 8.0% in 2023, with Portugal going from the top positions in 2000 to 13th in 2023 and below the EU average.

=== Evolution of the number of public employees in Portugal (1968–present) ===
Number of Public Employees

Year	Pop.	±%
1968	196,755	—
1979	383,103	+94.7%
1983	435,795	+13.8%
1986	464,321	+6.5%
1988	485,368	+4.5%
1991	509,732	+5.0%
1996	614,256	+20.5%
1999	701,911	+14.3%
2005	731,485	+4.2%
2006	726,523	−0.7%
2007	708,507	−2.5%
2008	692,279	−2.3%
2009	675,048	−2.5%
2010	663,167	−1.8%
2011	727,785	+9.7%

Year	Pop.	±%
2012	699,901	−3.8%
2013	674,927	−3.6%
2014	656,376	−2.7%
2015	659,144	+0.4%
2016	664,168	+0.8%
2017	669,321	+0.8%
2018	683,165	+2.1%
2019	699,031	+2.3%
2020	718,940	+2.8%
2021	733,896	+2.1%
2022	742,260	+1.1%
2023	745,406	+0.4%
2024	753,850	+1.1%
2025	766,278	+1.6%
2026Q3	764,805	−0.2%

^{A} All data refer to 31 December of the respective year, except 1996 (which refer to 1 October).
^{B} Data for 1986, 1988 and 1991 were obtained by estimates from internal surveys and exclude military and militarized personnel and public employees in the Azores and Madeira islands.
^{C} Data for 2010 is an estimate made in October 2010 for the State Budget 2011.

In 2023, around 15% of jobs, as a percentage of the workforce, were employed in the General Government, as opposed to an average of 18.4% in the OECD.

== Regional economy ==
2024 nominal GDP and GDP per capita in the NUTS II regions of Portugal according to data by the National Institute for Statistics (INE).

Rank	Region	GDP in euros €	% of GDP	GDP per capita	
Rank	Region	GDP in euros €	% of GDP	In euros €	As % of Portugal average
1	Greater Lisbon	90,685,940,000	31.3%	42,345	156.5%
2	North Region	85,749,418,000	29.6%	23,280	86.0%
3	Centro Region	39,654,182,000	13.7%	23,236	85.9%
4	West and Tagus Valley	18,226,562,000	6.3%	21,220	78.4%
5	Setúbal Peninsula	15,320,170,000	5.3%	18,205	67.3%
6	Algarve Region	14,312,161,000	4.9%	29,302	108.3%
7	Alentejo Region	12,035,392,000	4.2%	25,348	93.7%
8	Autonomous Region of Madeira	7,486,003,000	2.6%	29,012	107.2%
9	Autonomous Region of the Azores	5,753,263,000	2.0%	23,836	88.1%
Portugal		289,427,973,000	100.0%	27,063	100.0%

== Employment and wages ==
In the third quarter of 2026, the unemployment rate was at 5.5%.

The unemployment rate has been continuously falling since the end of 2013, marking the reversal of the increase of unemployed people trend that had been recorded since the 2000s. This negative trend had been pronounced with the impact of the 2008 financial crisis, causing the unemployment rate to climb, achieving a record of 17.7% in the early 2013, but decreasing to 5.6% by September 2026 with a total employed population of 5,341,300. For comparison, ten years earlier, in September 2016, the country had an employed population of 4,456,900 people.

The decrease of unemployment is related with the expanding of the Portuguese Economy registered since the third quarter of 2014 (after shrinking in 2011, 2012 and 2013). During the bailout years, between 150,000 to 200,000 people left the country, which reduced tensions and also impacted positively the reduction of the unemployment. However, by the end of the 2010s, a spike in immigration, with the entry of 1,2 million people since 2018, was responsible for a big increase in new jobs and a big reduction in unemployment. Youth unemployment (16 to 24 years of age) remains high, at 19.9% by the third quarter of 2026, but has seen a big reduction compared with the record high of 42.9% in early 2013.

Work conditions in Portugal have been improving, but the country is still among those in the EU where people work the most hours, wages which remain low in comparison with other EU members, albeit increasing, job insecurity nevertheless high, and very low productivity. Although being both a developed country and a high income country, Portugal has the lowest GDP per capita in Western Europe and according to the Eurostat it had the 6th lowest purchasing power among the 27 member states of the European Union by 2023.

=== Wages ===
The minimum monthly wage in Portugal is 920 euros (from January 1, 2026), having been previously set at 870 euros. The current minimum wage was established in December 2025, with the goal of reaching 1020 euros by 2028. The minimum wage has been increasing since 2015, when it stood at 505 euros. The annual median disposable income was $19,147 in year 2021 (PPP). The average gross wage is 1696 euros (US$1926, nearly the same as Croatia and Poland), and the average net wage is 1342 euros (US$1524) by the third quarter of 2026. All wages are paid 14 times a year, twelve monthly salary payments plus one month's pay in the form of a Christmas bonus and one month for a holiday bonus.

The Portuguese minimum wage, according to article 273 of the Labor Code, is set after dialogue and negotiations in the Permanent Social Conciliation Commission, whose value includes the Government and the Employers' Confederations and Trade Union Confederations. Minimum and average monthly wages by population employed by others, after income taxes:

Year	Minimum Wage	Average Wage (Note: By the fourth quarter of each year.)
2015	505 €	835 €
2016	530 €	846 €
2017	557 €	867 €
2018	580 €	898 €
2019	600 €	917 €
2020	635 €	957 €
2021	665 €	1,003 €
2022	705 €	1,036 €
2023	760 €	1,091 €
2024	820 €	1,226 €
2025	870 €	1,314 €
2026	920 €	1,373 € (Q3 2026)

=== Graduate unemployment ===
In 2008, about 8% of the people with a degree were unemployed, and a much larger proportion was underemployed. This was directly correlated with a general lack of employability and a student's under-preparation for the workplace that was seen among many courses in a number of fields that were offered by certain higher education institutions or departments. The implementation of the Bologna process and other educational reforms, such as the compulsory closing of a number of courses, departments, colleges and private universities after 2005 due to a lack of academic rigour and low teaching standards, was a completely new approach to tackle the problem. Since then, working population with a college degree has seen a constant increase, up 33.7% by 2024, still the 8th worst in the EU, while young working population (between the ages of 25 and 34 years old) with a college degree reached 43% in 2024, basically on pair with the EU's average, but with household costs and public funding systems still diverging from other members of the community.

=== Poverty prevention ===
==== History ====
Poverty and inequality are significant social problems that Portugal has attempted to address through various social policy measures. The European economic crisis has increased the number of households that remain below the poverty line in Portugal with the greatest affected being the youth due to high unemployment rates. The current economic crisis experienced across the globe is the leading cause of income inequalities which lead to poor market demand in an economy and lower economic growth in Portugal. The minimum wage policy is aimed at reducing abject poverty and income inequalities in Portugal which will increase demand and lead to economic stability in the long-term. In 2014 after a four-year freeze Portugal increased their minimum wage by 4%, a trend that continues. The minimum wage policy which came after negotiations with labor organizations and employers was only possible after substantial recovery of the economy and will increase the sustainability of the economy with aims at reducing poverty.

==== Taxes and transfer payments in Portugal ====
Portugal uses tax and transfer payments to increase equality between high-income earners and the low-income earners in the country. There are significant progressive characteristics of income taxes in Portugal. The government tax policy ensures that the high-income earners face higher taxes in comparison to low-income earners which have enabled the low-income earners to be able to stimulate demand for goods and services in the country economy. The high-income earners pay roughly three times the amount paid by the low-income earners. This approach has been significant in reducing income inequality through means of redistribution.

==== Portuguese GMI ====
The Act no. 19-A/96, 29 June created a policy measure by the name of GMI: Guaranteed minimum income. This decade old means tested approach ensures a minimum income which grants financial stability for the citizens of Portugal. The GMI is viewed as a right to the Portuguese people, and proves independent of market influences. The GMI program aims at providing the low-income earners who are above 18 years social and economic autonomy to encourage them to participate in the economic growth of the country. In 2001 reports show that 32 percent of those that were previously approved to benefit from the GMI have been discontinued after attaining an income above the minimum threshold. This report shows GMI policy measures as effective in eradicating poverty and increasing income equality in Portugal.

== Economy by sector ==
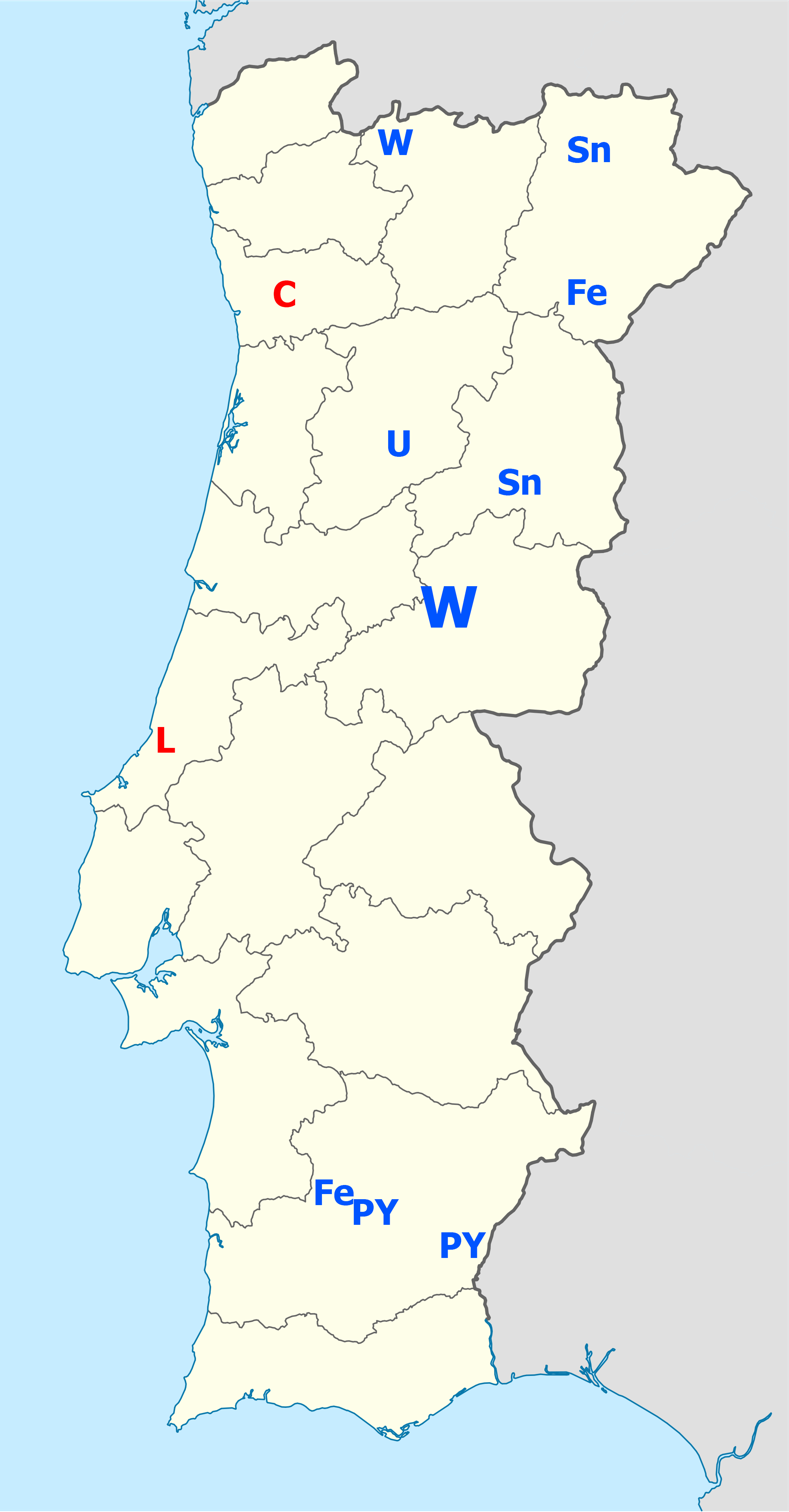
Natural resources of Portugal. Fe – iron ore, PY – pyrite, Sn – tin, W – tungsten, U – uranium, C – coal, L – lignite.

The tertiary sector is presently the most important component of the Portuguese economy, representing 75.8% of the gross value added (GVA) and employing 68.1% of the working population. It is followed by the industry sector, which represents 21.9% of the GVA, proving 24.5% of the jobs. Fisheries and agriculture – which represented 25% of the economy in 1960 – had a sharp decrease in its weight, now only representing 2.4% of the GVA, while employing 7.5% of the working population.

=== Natural resources ===
Forests are the major natural resource of Portugal, covering about 34% of the country. The most important forest resources are the pine trees (13,500 km^{2}), cork oaks (6800 km^{2}), holm oaks (5,340 km^{2}), and eucalyptus (2,430 km^{2}). Cork is a major production, with Portugal producing half of the world's cork. Significant mining resources are lithium, tungsten, tin, and uranium.

=== Agriculture ===
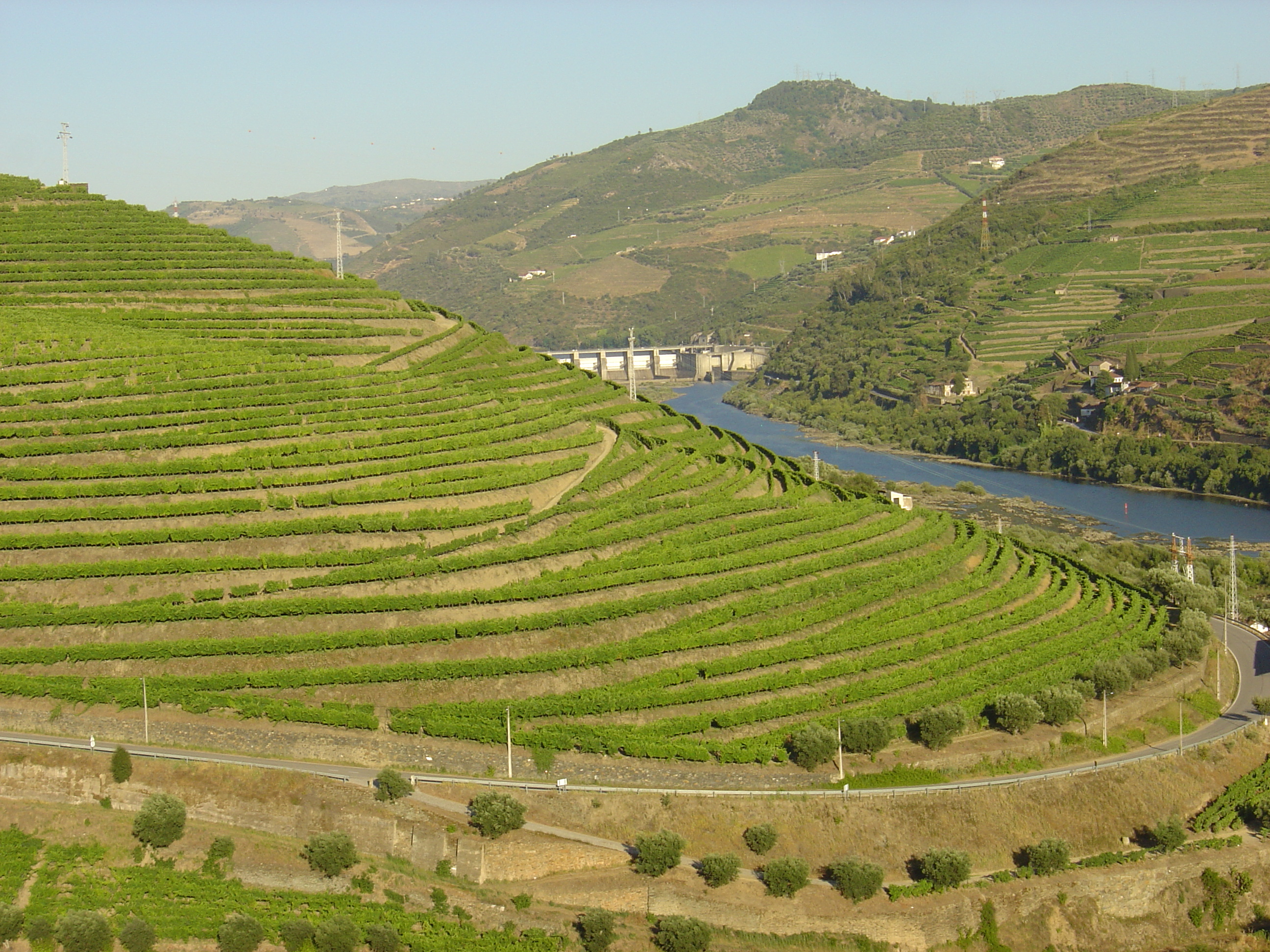
Vineyards in the Douro Valley

By 2024, the Agriculture sector in Portugal represented 2.9% of Gross Domestic Product. The country's total agricultural land corresponds to an area of approximately 3,697,000 ha (36,970 km^{2}) as of 2023.

Despite presently representing only a small percentage of the economy, a considerable part of continental Portugal is dedicated to agriculture. The South has developed an extensive monoculture of cereals and olive trees and the Douro Valley of vineyards. Olive trees (4,000 km^{2}; 1,545 sq mi), vineyards (3,750 km^{2}; 1,450 sq mi), wheat (3,000 km^{2}; 1,160 sq mi) and maize (2,680 km^{2}; 1,035 sq mi) are produced in vast areas. Portuguese wine and olive oil are especially praised by nationals for their quality, thus external competition (even at much lower prices) has had little effect on consumer demand.

Portugal is a traditional wine grower, and has exported its wines since the dawn of western civilization; Port Wine, Vinho Verde and Madeira Wine are the leading wine exports. Portugal is also a quality producer of fruits, namely the Algarve oranges, cherries (large production in Cova da Beira and Alto Alentejo), Oeste region's pêra rocha (a type of pear) and Alcobaça’s apples (maçã de Alcobaça). More recently, niche crops such as blueberry and raspberry have seen great increase in production, mainly for exporting. Other exports include horticulture and floriculture products, beet sugar, sunflower oil, cork, and tobacco.

=== Fisheries ===
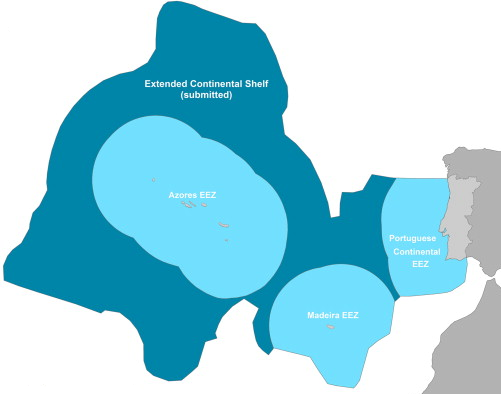
Portugal's Exclusive Economic Zone of 1,727,408 km^{2}: Exclusive Economic Zone Proposed expansion

The Portuguese fishing industry is fairly large and diversified. Fishing vessels classified according to the area in which they operate, can be divided into local fishing vessels, coastal fishing vessels and long-distance fishing vessels. The local fleet is mainly composed of small traditional vessels (less than 5 gross tonnage), comprising, in 2004, 87% of the total fishing fleet and accounting for 8% of the total tonnage. These vessels are usually equipped to use more than one fishing method, such as hooks, gill nets and traps, and constitute the so-called polyvalent segment of the fleet.

Their physical output is low but reasonable levels of income are attained by virtue of the high commercial value of the species they capture: octopus, black scabbardfish, conger, pouting, hake and anglerfish. Purse seine fishing is also part of the local fleet and has, on the mainland, only one target species: the sardine. This fishery represents 37% of total landings. Portugal's Exclusive Economic Zone has 1,727,408 km^{2}, being the 3rd largest of the EU and the 20th largest in the world.

The coastal fishing fleet accounted for only 13% of vessels but had the largest GT (93%). These vessels operate in areas farther from the coast, and even outside the Portugal's Exclusive Economic Zone. The coastal fishing fleet comprises polyvalent, purse seine and trawl fishing vessels. The trawlers operate only on the mainland shelf and target demersal species such as horse mackerel, blue whiting, octopus and crustaceans.

The crustacean trawling fishery targets Norway lobster, red shrimp and deepwater rose shrimp. The most important fish species landed in Portugal in 2004 were sardine, mackerel and horse mackerel, representing 37%, 9% and 8% of total landings by weight, and 13%, 1% and 8% of total value, respectively. Molluscs accounted for only 12% of total landings in weight, but 22% of total landings in value. Crustaceans were 0.6% of the total landings by weight and 5% by value. As of 2020, Portugal ranked sixth worldwide in seafood consumption per capita, with each Portuguese, on average, 59.36 kg/person of fish.

=== Industry ===
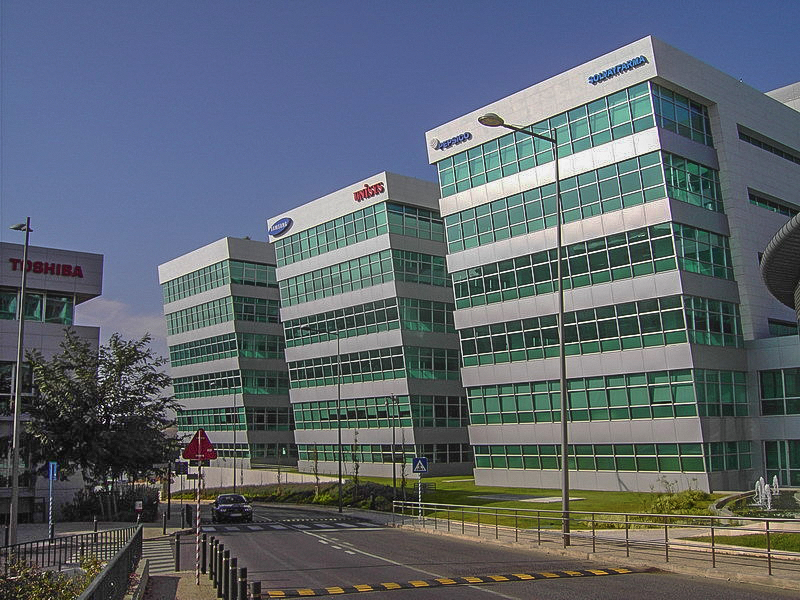
Oeiras Municipality, in Lisbon metropolitan area, has the headquarters of several Portuguese subsidiaries of major multinational companies.

The Portuguese industry had a high development, especially after the Second World War, achieving a peak in 1974, when it represented almost 35% of the GDP of Portugal and achieved a high degree of diversification. As of 2024, industry represented 21.2% of the country's GDP.

Presently, the major industries in Portugal include: machinery, electrical and electronics industries, automotive and shipbuilding industries, injection moulding, plastics and ceramics industries, textile, footwear and leather industries, oil refinery, petrochemistry and cement industries, beverages and food industries and furniture, pulp and paper, wood and cork industries.

Automotive and other mechanical industries such as bicycle industry are primarily located in and around Setúbal, Porto, Lisbon, Aveiro, Braga and Mangualde. Coimbra and Oeiras have growing technological-based industries, including pharmaceuticals and software. Sines has the largest oil refinery in the country and is a major petrochemical centre, as well as the busiest port in Portugal. Maia has one of the largest industrial parks of the country, including noted wood processing and food industries. Figueira da Foz and Setúbal are major centres of pulp and paper industry. Marinha Grande is the most reputed glass making centre of Portugal. Leiria, Oliveira de Azeméis, Vale de Cambra and Viseu, have important light industries, including injection moulding and plastics. Viana do Castelo and Setúbal are centres of ship building and repair industries.

Modern non-traditional technology-based industries like aerospace, biotechnology and information technology, have been developed in several locations across the country. Alverca, Covilhã, Évora, and Ponte de Sor are the main centres of Portuguese aerospace industry, which is led by the local branch of the Brazilian Embraer and by OGMA. Since after the turn of the 21st century, many major biotechnology and information technology industries have been founded and are concentrated in the metropolitan areas of Lisbon, Porto, Braga, Coimbra and Aveiro.

=== Energy ===
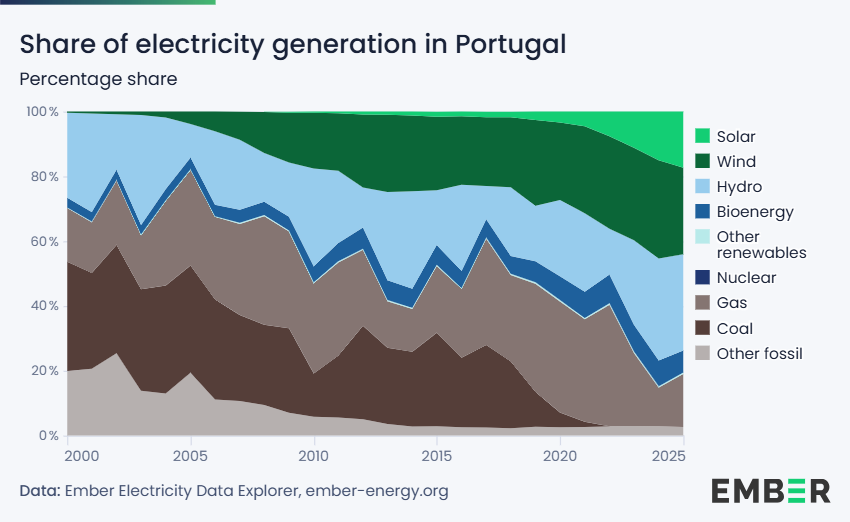
Share of electricity generation in Portugal - percentage share

Since the late 1990s, when wind power was virtually nonexistent in Portugal, the country has become the 6th producer of this kind of renewable energy. Along with the traditional Hydroelectric energy, the Portuguese companies, including the biggest one in the country – EDP – and with the support of the government have heavily invested in new kinds of renewable energy, from then on. In 2010, 52% of the energy produced in Portugal was renewable.

In 2013, 61.7% of the energy produced was renewable, including 30.4% hydroelectric, 24.1% from wind, 5.2% from biomass, 0.9% solar energy and 1.1% from other renewable energy sources, particularly geothermical energy in the Azores. Thanks to this energetic strategy, during 2013 Portugal had reduced to only 5% the energy that it imports. Fossil fuels are still the source of 38.3% or the energy produced, but the trend is to diminish. In 2013, the increase in the production of clean energy helped to save 806 million Euros in the imports of fossil fuels and CO_{2} emission licenses.

In May 2016, Portugal became the second country in the world to be able to have all its energy consumption fully covered by renewable energy alone, for four consecutive days. For the whole year of 2025, 68% of all electricity consumption was produced by renewable energy, reaching a record 37 TWh (Terawatt-hours), mostly supplied by solar energy which had a 25% increase.

In the 1970s, the country abandoned the plan to install nuclear plants and opted not to invest in nuclear power, so there are no such plants in Portugal.

=== Services ===
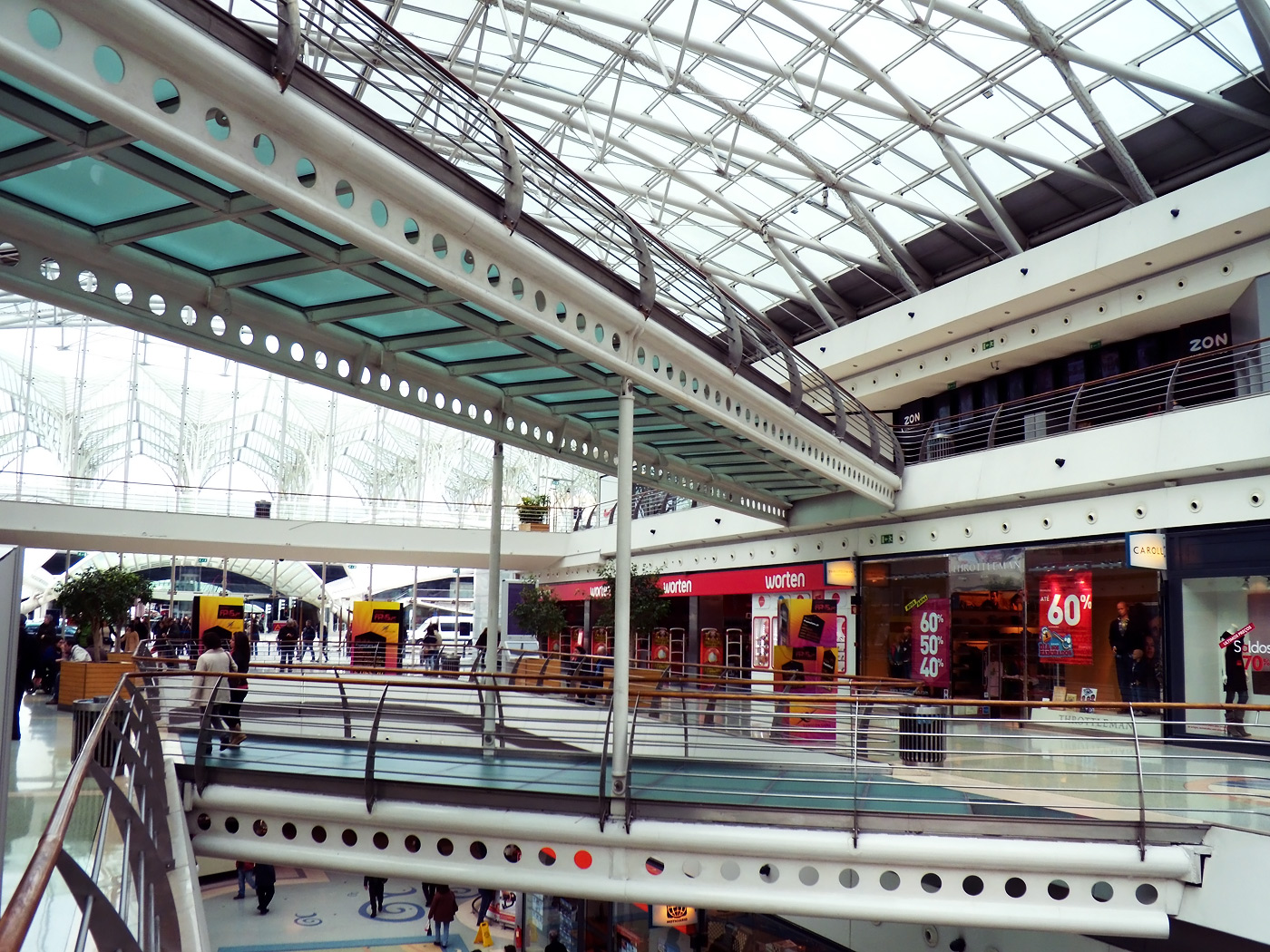
The Vasco da Gama Mall, in Lisbon

The tertiary sector has grown, producing 74.4% of the GDP and providing jobs for 65.9% of the working population. The most significant growth rates are found in the trade sector, due to the introduction of modern means of distribution, transport and telecommunications. Financial tertiary companies have benefited from privatisation, also gaining in terms of efficiency.

Tourism in Portugal has developed significantly, accounting for 11.8% of GDP by 2025. In 2025, the number of foreign tourists reached nearly 30 million.

Some large Portuguese companies in the services' sector have committed themselves to internationalize their services, like the retailer Jerónimo Martins, which holds the largest supermarket chain in Poland and is also investing in Colombia. Worth to notice is also TAP Portugal, a company often used by transit passengers traveling between Europe, Africa and Latin America (mainly Brazil), which is particularly regarded by its safety record.

=== Companies ===
As of 2024, Portugal had 1,593,415 active companies, an increase of 4.4% compared with the previous year. The sector with the highest number of companies registered in Portugal is "Administrative and support service activities" with 259,086 companies, followed by "Wholesale and retail trade; repair of motor vehicles and motorcycles" with 218,811 companies, and "Consulting, scientific, technical and similar activities" with 162,738 companies.

== Financial market ==
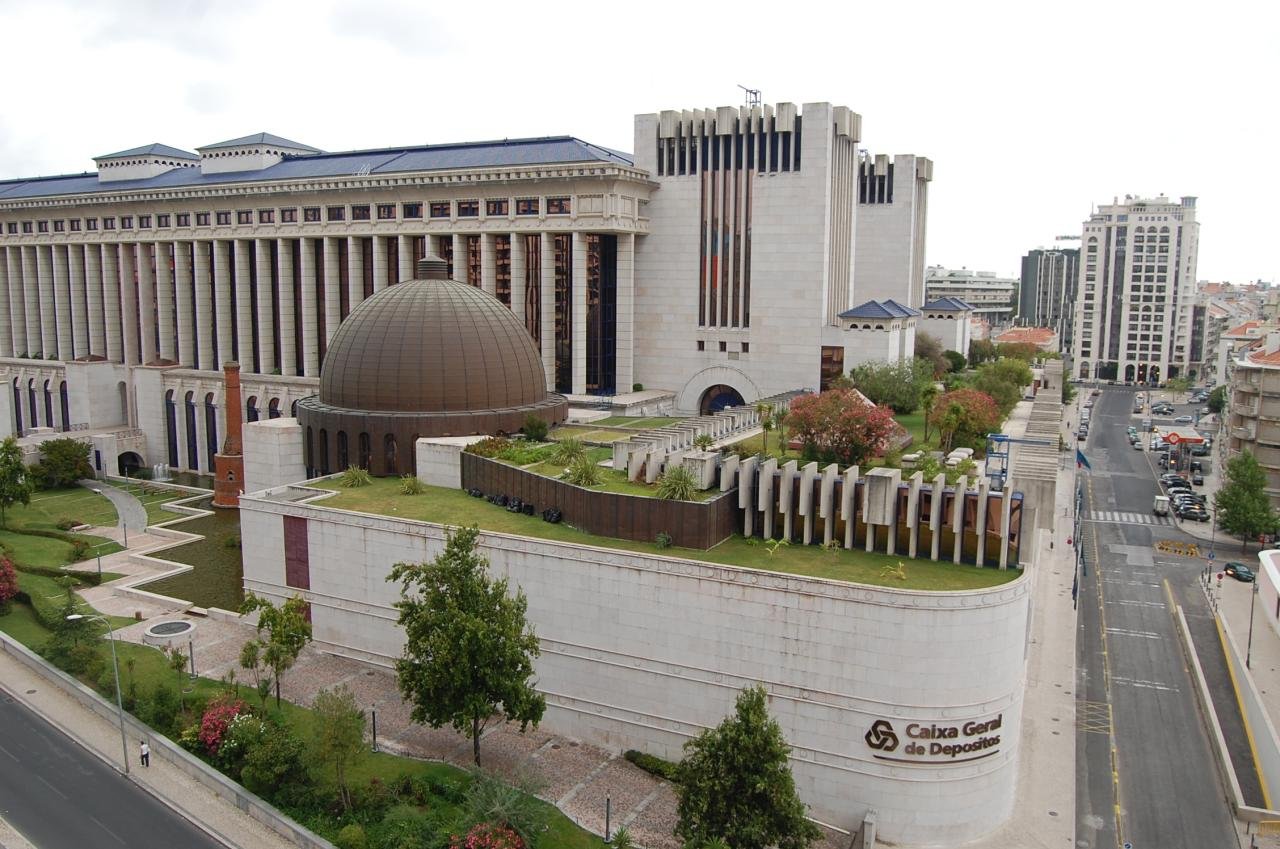
Headquarters of the Caixa Geral de Depósitos bank

In the Portuguese financial system, the major stock exchange is the Euronext Lisbon which is part of Euronext, the major pan-European group of stock exchanges. It is supervised and regulated by the Portuguese Securities Market Commission. The PSI-20 is Portugal's most selective and widely known stock index. Portugal's central bank is the Banco de Portugal, which is an integral part of the European System of Central Banks. The largest Portuguese banks are Banco Comercial Português and the state-owned Caixa Geral de Depósitos.

Portuguese banks hold strategic stakes in other sectors of the economy, including the insurance sector. Foreign bank participation is relatively high as is state ownership through the Caixa Geral de Depósitos (CGD). Overall, Portugal's financial system is sound, well managed and competitive, with shorter-term risks and vulnerabilities quite well contained, and with the system buttressed by a strong financial policy framework. Despite being relatively small and concentrated, Portugal's banking system generally compares well with other European Union (EU) countries in terms of efficiency, profitability, and asset quality, with solvency also close to European levels.

Across all the financial sub-sectors, and with particular reference to the larger institutions, supervision of Portuguese financial institutions is active, professional and well organized. The insurance sector has performed well, partly reflecting a rapid deepening of the market in Portugal. While sensitive to various types of market and underwriting risks, both the life and non-life sectors, overall, are estimated to be able to withstand a number of severe shocks, even though the impact on individual insurers varies widely.

== Competitiveness ==
The global distribution of Portuguese exports in 2006 as a percentage of the top market (Spain – $11,493,400,000)

Exports of Portugal by product category (2019) Chemical products Transportation Machines Mineral products Plastics and rubbers Metals Foodstuffs Precious metals Textiles Instruments Animal products Vegetable products Paper goods Footwear and headwear Miscellaneous Stone and glass Wood products Animal and vegetable bi-products Animal hides Arts and antiques Weapons

=== Portugal's competitiveness in the world ===
The economy of Portugal is ranked 37th in the World Competitiveness Ranking 2025 by Swiss institute IMD. In comparison, this represents a very slight drop from the 36th position where Portugal appeared in 2015.

=== Competitiveness by city ===
A study concerning competitiveness, ranking the different municipalities of the country, is published by the More Freedom Institute (Instituto Mais Liberdade). The best-ranked municipalities in the 2025 study were Lisbon, Oeiras and Porto.

Top 20 Ranking:

1. Lisbon: 70,1 points
2. Oeiras: 66,2
3. Porto: 61,6
4. Coimbra: 59,0
5. Aveiro: 53,6
6. Cascais: 52,8
7. Maia: 52,6
8. Alcochete: 52,5
9. Funchal: 51,8
10. São João da Madeira: 51,0
11. Matosinhos: 51,0
12. Braga: 50,7
13. Faro: 49,9
14. Leiria: 49,5
15. Évora: 49,3
16. Ponta Delgada: 48,9
17. Mafra: 48,7
18. Ílhavo: 48,5
19. Vila Franca de Xira: 48,2
20. Palmela: 48,1

== Domestic issues ==
- Forest fires: Like in other countries with very hot summers and seasonal drying of soils and vegetation, every year large areas of the Portuguese forest are destroyed. This has an important impact on the economy because many people and industries depend on forestry related activities. It is also a very dramatic ecological problem and a safety issue for the populations.
- Excessive bureaucracy: The excess of bureaucracy in public governance and services, adding to this lack of planning, is pointed as one the main problems of the Portuguese economy, leading to a paralyzed public administration that delays investments and reforms in the country.
- Inefficient public sector: The public sector has been generally considered an expensive and inefficient part of the economy. Bad organization, strong partisanship, different and conflicting career progressions and wages, plus an unprestigious image, has led to difficulties in reforming the sector and hiring skilled workers. In recent years, working conditions in the public sector have worsened, with high precariousness and loss in purchasing power. Several governments in the last decades have proposed public sector reforms, but most failed due to structural blockages, resistance to corporate change, and constant governmental changes.
- Weak economic structure: The Portuguese economy suffers from systemic problems, that prevent robust and structural economic growth: Persistent low wages and low productivity, which then leads to a brain drain with young, skilled workers leaving the country in search of better opportunities, coupled with a high tax burden; An over-dependency on low-value services, such as tourism; Plus a lack of entrepreneurial spirit and innovation, with a heavy reliance on public subsidies.
- Corruption: According to the 2008 Corruption Perceptions Index of countries published by Transparency International, Portugal had the 32nd lowest level of corruption out of 180 countries. 17 years later, by 2025, the country fell to 46th place. Nevertheless, corruption has become an issue of major political and economic significance for the Portuguese. The responsible authorities and many civic associations and think tanks are trying to combat corruption before it increases further. Many abusive lobbies and corruption schemes are related to concessions, unclear approvals to contractors and economic groups, or job creation for and commercial agreements with friends and family members, mainly involving the huge public sector and companies. Some cases are well known and were widely reported in the media, such as the affairs in several municipalities involving local town hall officials and businesspersons, as well as a number of politicians with wider responsibilities and power. Notable criminal cases include the Face Oculta, the Oeiras Municipality Mayor Isaltino Morais scandal, the Apito Dourado and the Saco Azul de Felgueiras and Operação Marquês involving former Prime Minister José Sócrates.

== Education, training and research in business and economic sciences ==
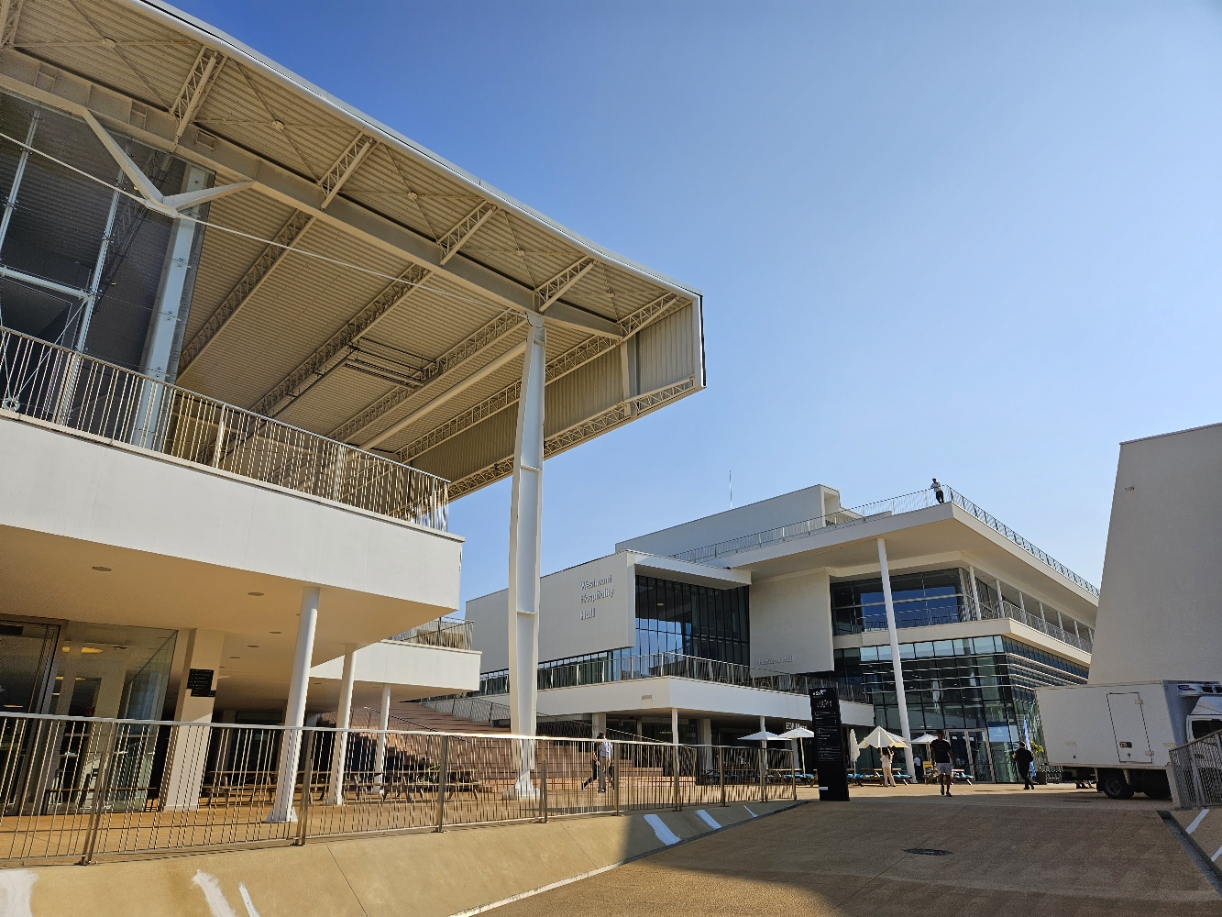
The NOVA SBE, one of the Portuguese world class business schools

There are many higher education institutions awarding academic degrees in economics and business management, spread across the whole country. Programmes in management and administration are offered by almost every Portuguese universities and polytechnics. Programmes in economics are offered by all public and by some private universities.

Among the largest and most reputed universities, which host an economics department and develop research on this area, are the University of Lisbon (through its ISEG - Lisbon School of Economics and Management), the ISCTE – Lisbon University Institute, the Portuguese Catholic University (through their Católica Lisbon School of Business and Economics and Católica Porto School of Economics and Management), the University of Porto (through its Faculdade de Economia); the Universidade Nova de Lisboa (through its NOVA SBE – Nova School of Business and Economics); the Minho University (through its Escola de Economia e Gestão ); and the University of Coimbra (through its Faculdade de Economia ). The Financial Times European Business school ranking has consistently placed the Católica Lisbon School of Business and Economics and the Nova School of Business and Economics among the top European business and economics schools.

Besides the higher education institutions, both the Bank of Portugal and the Statistics Portugal conduct extensive and systematic research and publish reports on the Portuguese economy.

== Poverty ==
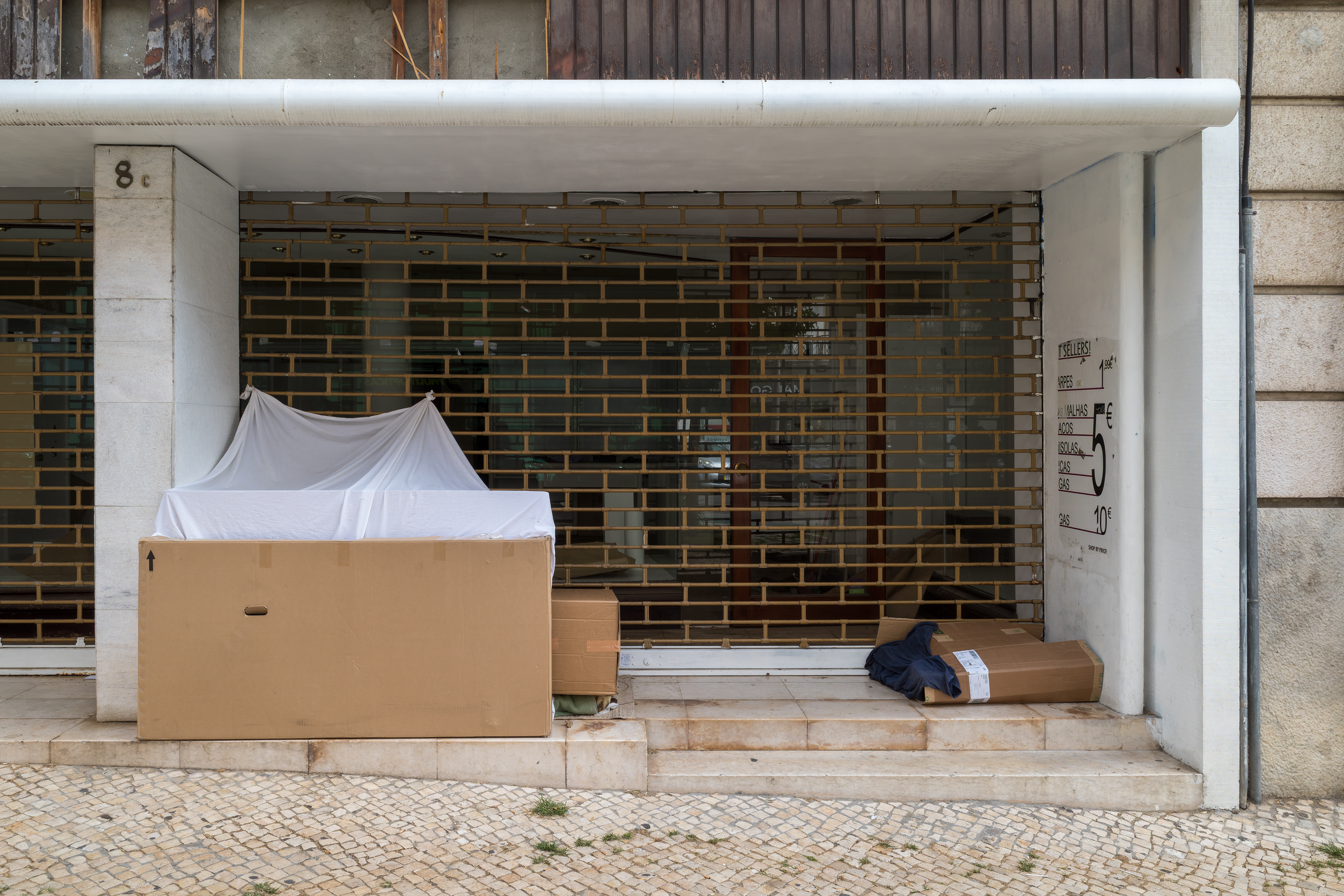
Homeless cardboard boxes in Lisbon.

In 2023, 40.3% of the population were at risk of poverty before social transfers. When pensions are included the percentage goes down to 21.4%. By the same year, 16.6% of the population were at risk of poverty after social transfers, meaning their disposable income was below their national at-risk-of-poverty threshold, which is set at 60% of the national median income per adult equivalent.

One year later (2024), the percentage of population at risk of poverty dropped to 15.4%. According to the National Statistics Institute (INE), the decrease in poverty covered all age groups, with a particular drop in the elderly population. On the other hand, homelessness has increased by 76% in four years: By 2024, 14,476 people were homeless in Portugal. In 2020 there were 8,209.

Share (%) of population below the poverty line
Year	1995	1997	1999	2001	2003	2005	2007	2009	2011	2013	2015	2017	2019	2020	2021	2022	2023	2024
Share	23.0	22.0	21.0	20.0	20.4	18.5	18.5	17.9	17.9	19.5	19.0	17.3	16.2	18.4	16.4	17.0	16.6	15.4

=== Food insecurity ===
In 2005 and 2006, the National Health Survey gathered information on food security which showed that those making a monthly household income of 251-500 euros made up 37.3% of the food insecure, which was quite contrary to their counterparts. For instance, those making more than a monthly household income of 901 euros made up only 15.9% of the food insecure. After the 2010–2014 Portuguese financial crisis, food insecurity escalated and notably affected those in poorer regions in Portugal—such as Alentejo and Algarve. In the Algarve region, total food insecurity increased from 56.9% to 77.1% from 2011 to 2012, and the severe food insecurity increased from 13.2% to 41.7%. Meanwhile, the national food insecurity only increased by 0.5% (48.6% to 49.1%) and the severe food insecurity of other regions, such as Centro and Norte, started much lower and only increase by approximately 3%. Overall, the general prevalence of food insecurity from 2011 to 2013 in Portugal was practically unchanged; however, the less fortunate and poorer regions were seen to have taken the toll, despite future progress.

The percentage of the Portuguese population suffering from moderate or severe food insecurity between 2022 and 2024 was on average 11.9%, which puts Portugal well above the average of 5.9% recorded in Southern Europe. Portugal was the 3rd country among the 13 in Southern Europe with the highest percentage in this indicator, behind Albania (33.0%) and North Macedonia (15.2%).

=== Economic emigration ===
In 2021, the United Nations revised downwards the estimate of how many Portuguese lived outside the country: the organization once pointed to 2.6 million in 2020, but corrected it to 2 million, making Portugal the 20th country in the world with the most emigrants compared to the number of residents. More Portuguese left the country in 2021 than before the COVID-19 pandemic. An increase in emigration to Northern Europe, Belgium and the Netherlands was reported. Portuguese emigrants living in France, Switzerland and the United Kingdom sent the most remittances to Portugal. In 2022, emigrants living in these countries were responsible for more than half of the remittances received by Portuguese families. The data released monthly by the Bank of Portugal on the value of remittances that emigrants send to Portugal shows an increase of 1.8% in 2021 compared to the previous year, surpassing 3 billion euros. Portugal was one of the EU member states with the highest figures for remittances received.

== See also ==
- Government of Portugal
- Portuguese national debt
- List of taxes in Portugal
