= Vale da Rosa =

- Company type: Private
- Industry: Agricultural
- Founded: 1972; 53 years ago in Ferreira do Alentejo, Portugal
- Founder: Silvestre Ferreira family
- Headquarters: Ferreira do Alentejo, Portugal
- Products: Table grape
- Owner: António Silvestre Ferreira
- Website: valedarosa.com

Vale da Rosa is a Portuguese company and table grape brand, headquartered in Ferreira do Alentejo. It produces table grapes, including seedless grapes, for the export market.

Founded in 1972, it is located on the Ferreira do Alentejo area and in the centre of a regional development triangle formed by the Beja airport, the port of Sines and the Alqueva Dam, producing table grapes, including seedless grapes, in an area of 230 hectares (570 acres) under cover. There are an average number of 300 people working in the company and this number usually goes up to 500 during the most labour demanding season which has a duration of 5 months.

The company has been featured in several major media such as RTP, Correio da Manhã and Expresso.

== See also ==
- Agriculture in Portugal
