= Instituto Superior de Agronomia =

Coordinates: 38.7076284°N 9.1823055°W

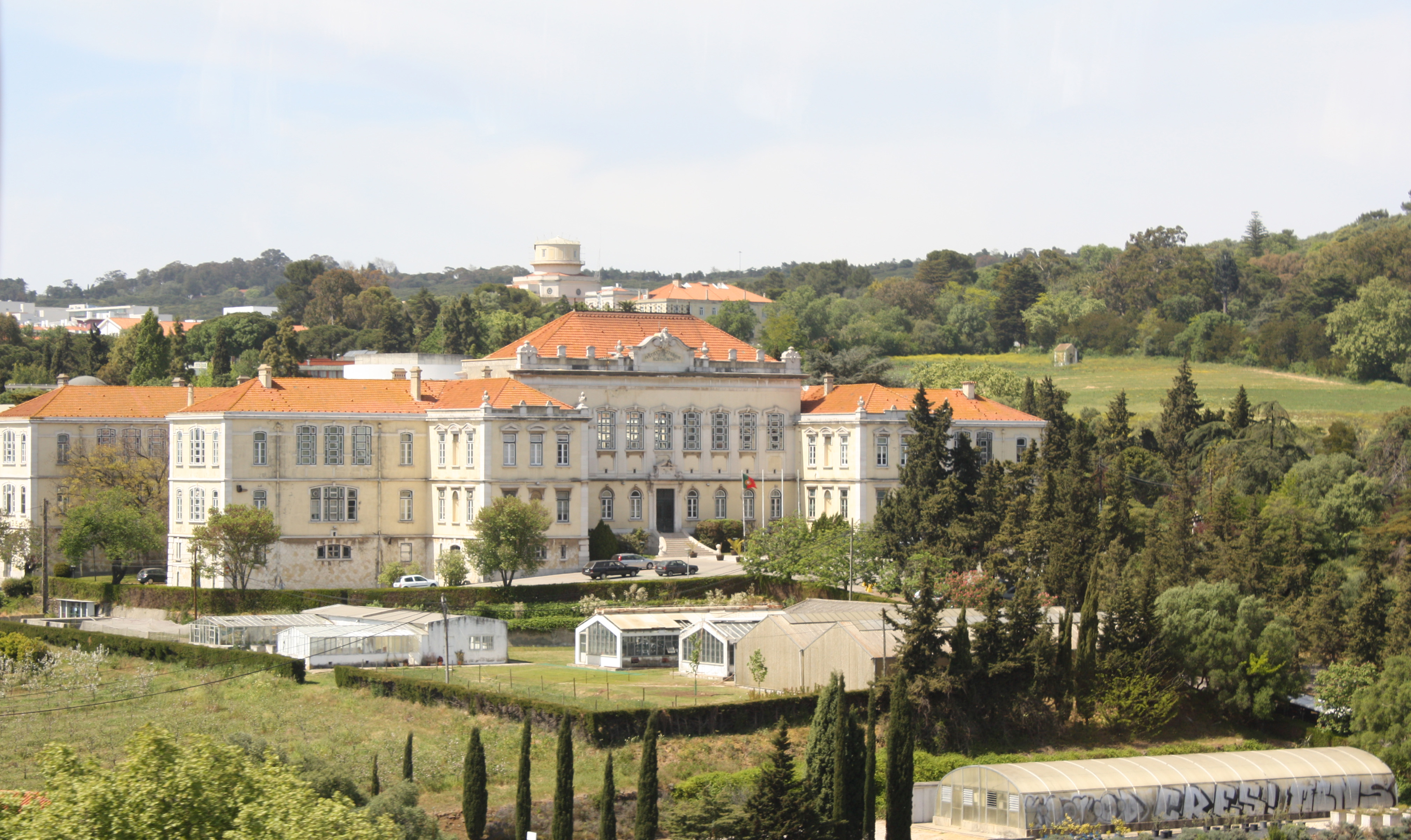
- Formation: 1930
- President: António Brito
- Parent organization: University of Lisbon
- Staff: 404 (2021)
- Website: www.isa.ulisboa.pt

Instituto Superior de Agronomía (ISA), School of Agronomy – University of Lisbon, is a faculty for graduate and post-graduate studies in Agronomy, Forestry, Food Science, Landscape Architecture, Environment, Animal Production, Plant Protection, Economy and Rural Sociology and Botany and Biological Engineering.

The student population is over 1500 in three levels of studying, including post-doctoral research studies. The teaching staff consists of 142 teachers and 88 researchers, and is organized in 10 departments.

The school’s location is in the Monsanto forest of Lisbon, in a green wooded area of 100 hectares (250 acres) with various agronomic, forestry and vineyards experimentations sites. This area is classified as of “Public Interest” and it plays an important role in the city’s environmental balance and is a fundamental recreational landscape for Lisbon’s population.

It also includes a small conference centre with a 300-delegate capacity, an Exhibition Pavilion with a Victorian (iron/Eiffel-like) architecture, several gardens, rugby and football fields and other facilities, all of which can also be used by the city community.

== Degrees ==
=== Main graduation areas (1st cycle) - 180 ECTS ===
- Biology
- Landscape Architecture

Engineering Sciences of

- Agronomy
- Animal husbandry
- Environment
- Food
- Forestry

=== Science Master degrees (2nd cycle) - 120 ECTS ===
- Agricultural Engineering
- Applied Mathematics in Biological Sciences
- Environmental Engineering
- Food Engineering
- Forestry Engineering and Natural Resources
- Functional Biology
- Natural Resources Management and Conservation
- Animal Science
- Landscape Architecture
- Green Data Science

=== PhDs (3rd cycle) ===
- Climate Change and Sustainable Development Policies
- Landscape Architecture and Urban Ecology
- Sustainability Science
- Development Studies
- Interdisciplinary Landscape Management
- Agricultural Innovation in Tropical Food Chains
- River Restoration and Management
- Sustainable Land Use

== Notable alumni ==
People who have been awarded a degree by ISA or otherwise have attended it, include:

- Amílcar Cabral, Guinea-Bissauan independentist, guerrilla, agronomist.
- Dom Duarte, 24th Duke of Braganza, claimant to the throne of Portugal, agronomist.
- Tim, musician, vocalist of Xutos & Pontapés, agronomist.
- Gonçalo Ribeiro Telles, landscape architect and politician.

== See also ==
- Agriculture in Portugal
- Technical University of Lisbon
