= Pêra Rocha =

Variety of pear

Rocha Pear
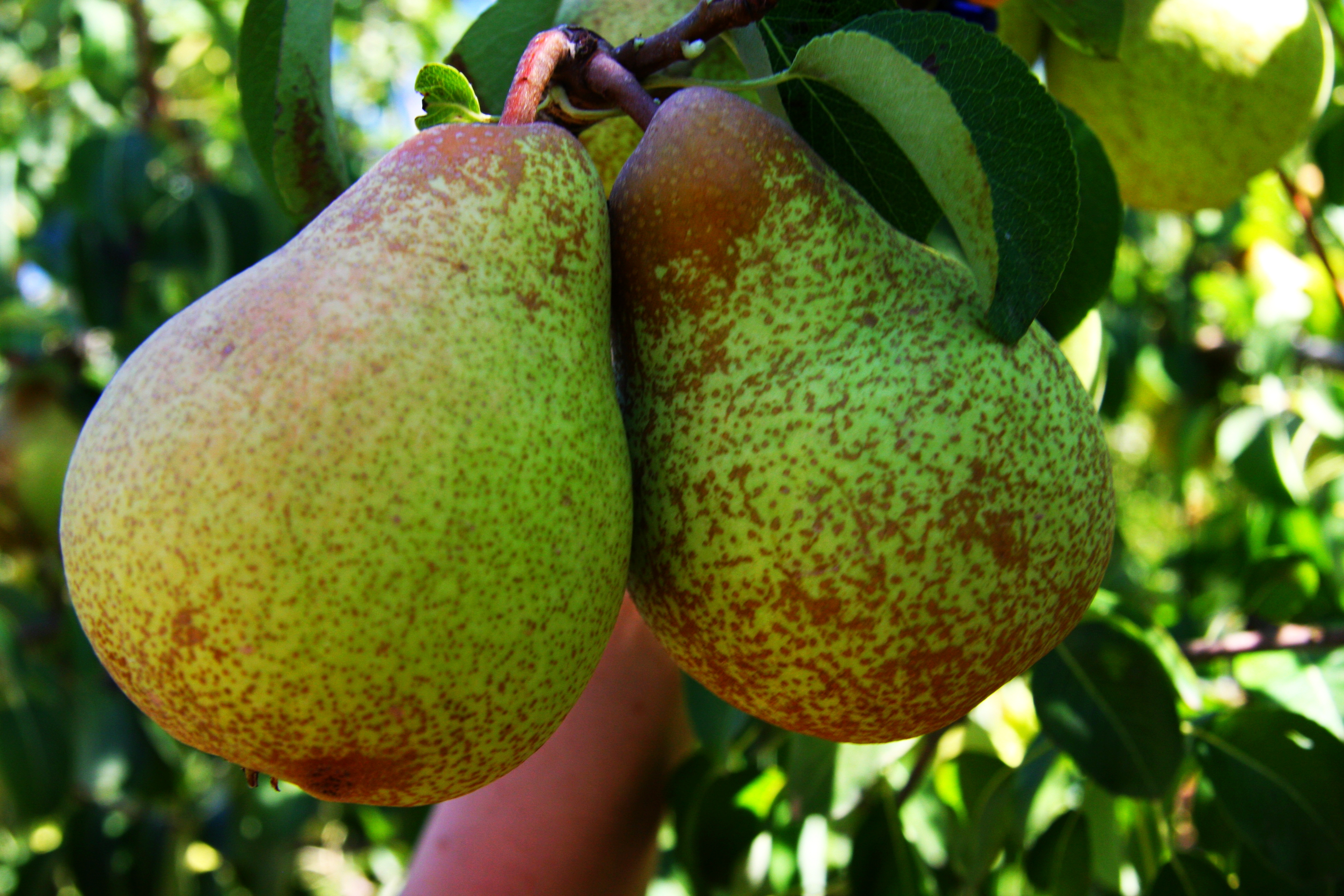
- Portuguese grown Rocha Pear
- Genus: Pyrus
- Species: Pyrus communis
- Cultivar: Rocha
- Origin: (Portugal) Sintra, 1836

Pera Rocha (European Portuguese: [ˈpeɾɐ ˈʁɔʃɐ]) is a native Portuguese variety of pear. The earliest account of the Rocha variety dates from 1836, in the Sintra municipality. This variety was casually obtained from a seed, on Pedro António Rocha's farm. The variety derives its name from his family name. The 'Rocha' pear is produced in several places in Portugal. The production area is over 100 square kilometres (39 sq mi) and there are about 9,450 producers.

== Pera Rocha do Oeste DOP ==
Rocha Pear produced in the Oeste region of Portugal has a PDO status since 2003. Its specific characteristics are the following:

- Size: medium 55 mm to 75 mm
- Format: oval, piriform
- Skin: fine and smooth
- Colour: yellow and green
- Russeting: typical around peduncle
- Pulp Colour: white
- Pulp: hard and firm, crunchy, juicy and sweet
- 'Rocha' pear is very sensitive to pear scab (Venturia pyrina) and also to Stemphylium vesicarium.

Over 13,520,000 kg of Oeste’s Rocha Pear was exported in 2004 to countries like Britain, Brazil, France, Ireland, Russia, Poland, the Netherlands, Canada, and Spain.

== See also ==
- Agriculture in Portugal
- List of Portugal Fresh fruits with protected status
