= Grupo RAR =

Portuguese business group

Grupo RAR, one of Portugal’s business groups, comprises a portfolio of diversified businesses in the areas of packaging, food, real estate and services. With a turnover in 2019, of 781 million euros and 4,228 employees, RAR Group is present in Portugal, Brazil, Germany, Mexico, Poland, Spain, the United Arab Emirates and the United Kingdom. The company is headquartered in Porto and was founded in 1962 by João Macedo Silva as RAR - Refinarias de Açúcar Reunidas, S.A.R.L., with an initial capital of 10 million escudos. In 1962, a piece of land was purchased at Rua Manuel Pinto de Azevedo in Porto for the construction of the future industrial sugar refining plant which is the origin of the company.
