= Companhia das Lezírias =

Portugal owned multi-use farm

The Companhia das Lezírias (Lezírias Company) or CL for short (the only two letters in the company logotype), is a state-run agriculture and forestry company located in the Lezíria do Tejo subregion, and headquartered in Samora Correia, Benavente municipality, Portugal. It was founded in the 19th century by the Portuguese Crown. The company is an ecological sanctuary and periurban farming area, near Grande Lisboa subregion - the most populated subregion of Portugal. The company produces rice, wine, cork, and livestock, as well as being a reputed horse breeder. In addition to its farming, forestry, and animal production activities, the Companhia das Lezírias has organised top equestrian events.

== History ==
The Lezírias Company was founded in 1836 when the Portuguese Crown sold properties located near the capital city, Lisbon. It comprised 48,000 hectares of land located between the Tagus and Sado Rivers. This property was reduced to less than half by global crises such as the Great Depression and the World Wars, as well as local climatic changes, seismic catastrophes and political turmoil which led to extensive land transaction. Nevertheless, the company was an important infrastructure for Portuguese agriculture throughout history, its modernity and technological developments in animal and vegetable farming as well as in forestry, were always noted in the country. After 138 years, the Lezírias Company was nationalized, hence returning to state ownership status. The state-owned enterprise's economic sustainability and the policy to prevent urbanization from spreading there are the main tasks of its current administrations.
