= Valouro =

Portuguese economic group

Grupo Valouro (Valouro Group) or simply Valouro, is one of the largest economic groups in Portuguese agrobusiness industry and the biggest in the poultry sector. Headquartered in Torres Vedras Municipality, it has several companies and a portfolio of leading brands in poultry and animal feeds, including Rações Valouro, Avibom, Kilom and Pinto Valouro.

== History ==
Working in the Portuguese poultry market since 1875, the Santos family began to modernize and expand the business in 1966 with the construction of a poultry slaughterhouse (the second private facility installed in the country). This unit, now known as Building Avibom, serves as the core of the Valouro, SGPS, SA. In 1978, with the aim of complementing the poultry business, was installed a feed mill in Marteleira in the municipality of Lourinhã, which was followed 10 years later by another unit in Ramalhal in the municipality of Torres Vedras, and then another plant near Badajoz, Spain. The company's expansion continued, and today has several slaughterhouses that produce poultry meat under various trade names for the Portuguese and international markets.

In 2013, Valouro signed a deal with Russian producers to export €3 million in hatching eggs to the country each year.

In 2022, the company purchased four disused poultry farms in Vila Franca de Xira for €2.5 million.

In 2025, the company celebrated its 150th anniversary.
