= Sovena Group =

Portuguese agribusiness holding companies

Sovena Group is one of the largest Portuguese agribusiness holding companies, producing cooking oils, olive oils, olives and soap. It has its own farmyards in Portugal and several other countries.

== History ==
Sovena was founded in the 1956, in Portugal, as a joint-venture of Companhia União Fabril (CUF), Macedo e Coelho and Sociedade Nacional de Sabões. After the Carnation Revolution of 1974 and the subsequent Processo Revolucionário em Curso (PREC), it was nationalized. Jorge de Mello, an heir of the disbanded CUF conglomerate, rebuilt the company through a new holding called Nutrinveste. In 2004, the Nutrinveste Group sales turnover reached US$840 million. In 2005, Nutrinveste sold its Compal (fruit juices, beverages, tomato products and canned vegetables) and Nutricafés (coffee products) businesses. The new consolidated Sovena Group was created in 2008. By this time, intensive olive groves with a high density planting, usually 500 to 750 trees per acre, modern irrigation systems, namely drop by drop, and also more rational fertilization were set up by the company in several locations across the world, mainly in Portugal, Spain, Morocco and Tunisia.

== Organization ==
Sovena is currently present worldwide. The company has four different inter-related business areas that cover the olive oil, table olive, vegetable oil and also soap value chain.

- Sovena Consumer Goods – products, which range from olive oils to vegetable oils, table olives, vinegars and soaps. Its factories are scattered around Portugal, Spain, the U.S.A. and Tunisia, but it also has commercial teams in Brazil and Angola, and it exports to more than 70 other countries on all 5 continents.
- Sovena Oliseeds – The genesis of the group is vegetable oils. In both the Portuguese and the Spanish operations, it sells seeds for planting and buys back the production of farmers, that it then used to crush and refine vegetable oils.
- Sovena Agriculture – This business area consists of exploring its own farmyards, or rented ones, in order to grow olive groves and manage olive oil mills where its own olives can be processed. It is a huge project, one of the largest in the World, and it is already working at full speed in Portugal, Spain and Morocco.
- Sovena Biodiesel – Despite not being its core business, the use of vegetable oils to produce biofuels brought the company into the energy business.

== Brands ==
- Sovena
- AAA
- Frigi
- Fula
- GEM
- Vêgê
- Oliveira da Serra
- Andorinha
- Olivari
- Clarim
- Fontoliva
- Primadonna
