= Derovo =

Portuguese company producing egg products

Derovo - Derivados de ovos, S.A. is a Portugal-based company headquartered in Pombal and founded in 1994, specialized in the production of pasteurized egg products, in the production of boiled eggs, in the production of Fullprotein (protein drink - world's first egg-white-based drink), and develops egg-based products to the needs of its customers, targeted at various markets such as food industries, pastries, bakeries and confectionery. It has the Certification and Quality Control ISO 9001:2000; and HACCP – Food Safety. Derovo is currently present in Portugal, Spain, France and Angola. Among its awards are Egg Products Company of the Year Award by the IEC - International Egg Commission (2002); Medalha de Mérito Industrial by the Câmara Municipal de Pombal (2002); Prémio Internacionalização by Gesventure (2004); Certificate of Fullprotein as Selected Trends & Innovations in the Sial – Global Food Marketplace (2006); Toféu Afonso Lopes Vieira as the best Company by the Local Newspaper Região de Leiria (2007).
