= Economic history of Portugal =

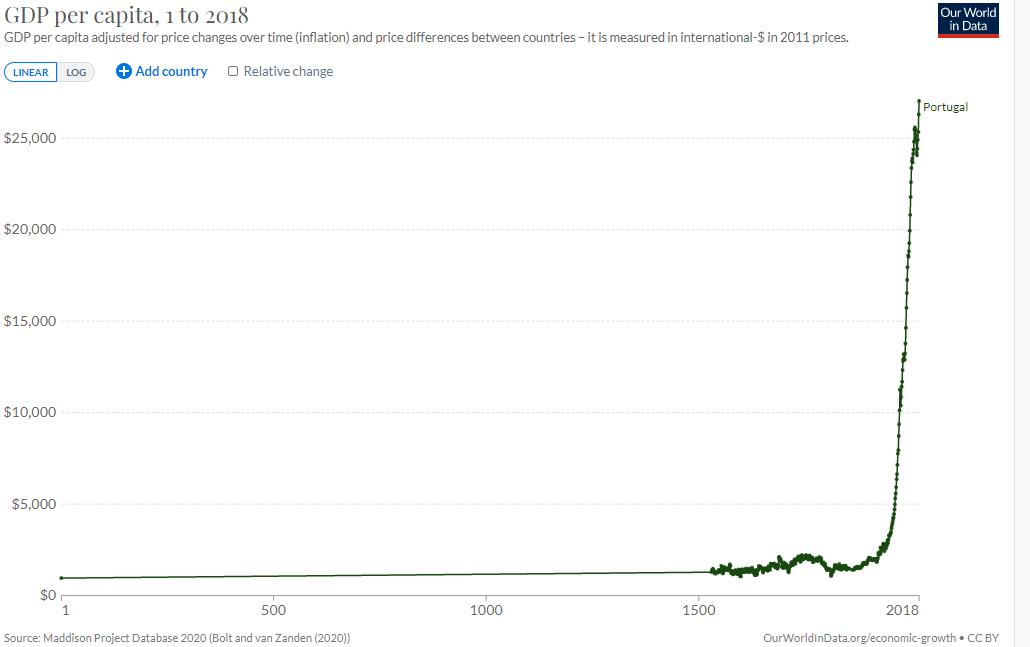
Historical development of real GDP per capita in Portugal

The economic history of Portugal covers the development of the economy throughout the course of Portuguese history. It has its roots prior to nationality, when Roman occupation developed a thriving economy in Hispania, in the provinces of Lusitania and Gallaecia, as producers and exporters to the Roman Empire. This continued under the Visigoths and then Al-Andalus Moorish rule, until the Kingdom of Portugal was established in 1139.

With the end of Portuguese reconquista and integration in the European Middle Age economy, the Portuguese were at the forefront of maritime exploration of the Age of Discovery, expanding to become the first global empire. Portugal then became the world's main economic power during the Renaissance, introducing most of Africa and the East to European society, and establishing a multi-continental trading system extending from Japan to Brazil.

In 1822, Portugal lost its main overseas territory, Brazil. The transition from absolutism to a parliamentary monarchy involved a devastating Civil War from 1828 to 1834. The governments of the constitutional monarchy were not able to truly industrialise and modernise the country; by the dawn of the twentieth century, Portugal had a GDP per capita of 40% of the Western European average and an illiteracy rate of 74%. Portuguese territorial claims in Africa were challenged during the Scramble for Africa. Political chaos and economic problems endured from the last years of the monarchy to the first Republic of 1910–1926, which led to the installing of a national dictatorship in 1926. While Finance Minister António de Oliveira Salazar managed to discipline the Portuguese public finances, it evolved into a single-party corporative regime in the early 1930s—the Estado Novo—whose first three decades were also marked by a relative stagnation and underdevelopment; as such, by 1960 the Portuguese GDP per capita was only 38% of the EC-12 average.

Starting in the early 1960s, Portugal entered in a period of robust economic growth and structural modernisation, owing to a liberalisation of the economy. As an expression of such economic opening, in 1960 the country was one of the EFTA founding member states. Yearly growth rates sometimes with two digits, allowed the Portuguese GDP per capita to reach 56% of the EC-12 average by 1973. This growth period eventually ended in the mid-1970s, for that contributing the 1973 oil crisis and the political turmoil following the 25 April 1974 coup which led to the transition to democracy. From 1974 to the late 1970s, over one million Portuguese citizens arrived from the former African overseas territories, most as destitute refugees—the retornados. After nearly a decade of economic troubles, during which Portugal received two IMF-monitored bailouts, in 1986 the country entered the European Economic Community (and left the EFTA). The European Union's structural and cohesion funds and the growth of many of Portugal's main exporting industries were leading forces in a new period of robust economic growth and socio-economic development that would flourish (though with a short crisis around 1992–94) to the early 2000s. In 1991, GDP per capita surpassed the 1973 level and by 2000 it had achieved 70% of the EU-12 average, which nonetheless constituted an approach to the Western European standards of living without precedents in the centuries before. Similarly, for several years Portuguese subsidiaries of large multinational companies ranked among the most productive in the world. However, the economy has been stagnant since the early 2000s and was heavily hit by the effects of the Great Recession, which eventually led to an IMF/EU-monitored bailout from 2011 to 2014. In 2022, Portugal was on the verge of becoming by 2030 the 3rd poorest member state of the European Union (out of 27).

The country adopted the euro in 1999. Despite being both a developed country and a high income country, Portugal's GDP per capita was of about 80% of the EU-27 average. The Global Competitiveness Report of 2008–2009 ranked Portugal 43rd out of 134 countries and territories. Research by the Economist Intelligence Unit's (EIU) Quality of Life survey in 2005 ranked Portugal 19th in the world. Portugal is home to a number of major companies with international reputation such as Grupo Portucel Soporcel, a major world player in the international paper market, Sonae Indústria, the largest producer of wood-based panels in the world, Corticeira Amorim, the world leader in cork production, and Conservas Ramirez, the oldest canned fish producer in continuous operation.

== Pre-nationality ==
Before the arrival of Romans in Iberia, the peninsula had a rural-based subsistence economy with very limited trade, with the exception of large cities on the Mediterranean coast, which had contact with Greek and Phoenician traders. Pre-Celts and Celts were some of the first groups present in the territory, with the Celtic economy centered on cattle raising, agriculture, and metal working.

=== Roman province ===
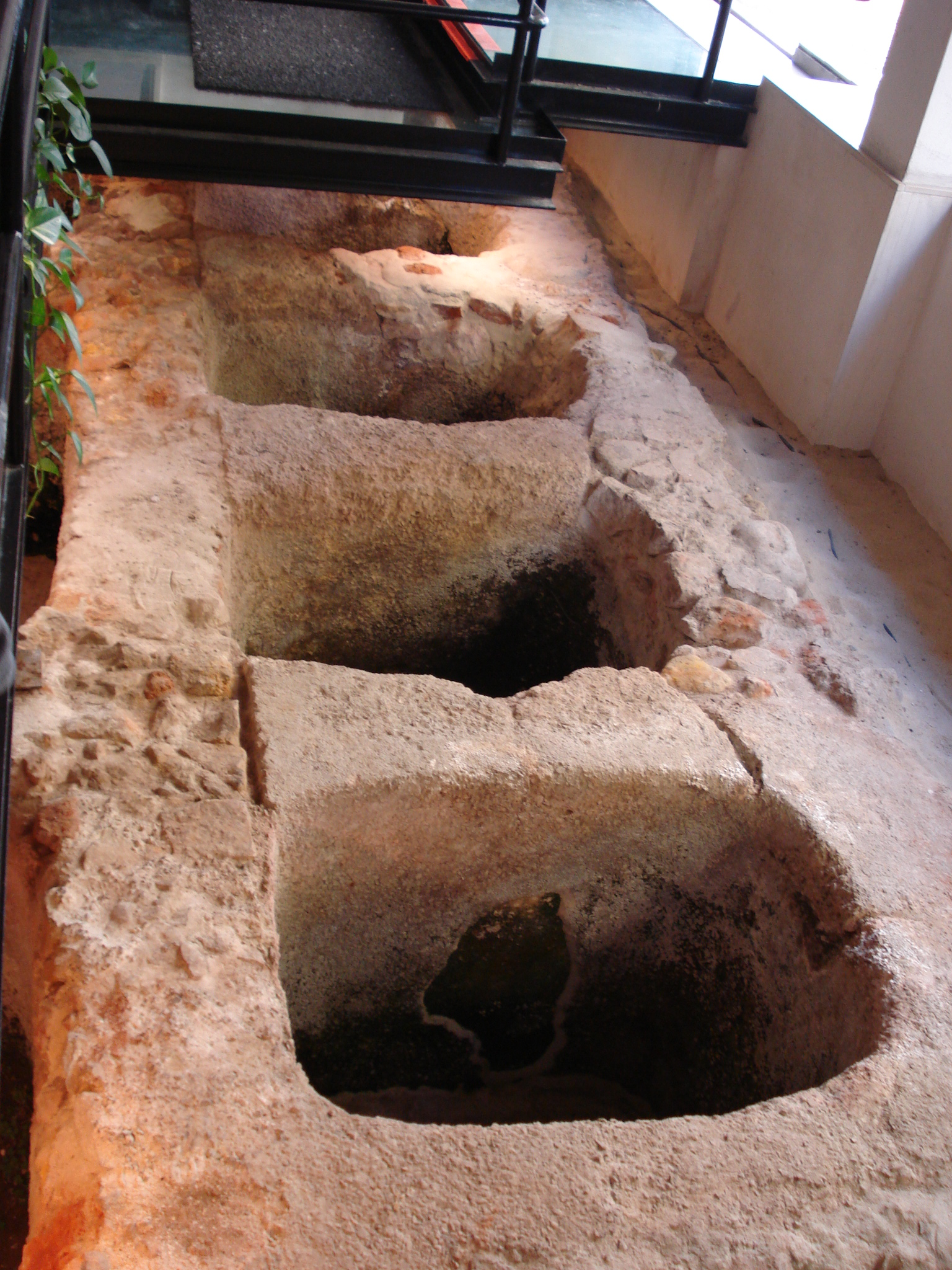
Roman fish preserving plant, Setúbal.

The territory's mineral wealth made it an important strategic region during the early metal ages, and one of the first objectives of the Romans when invading the peninsula was to access the mines and other resources. After the Second Punic War, from 29 BC to 411 AD, Rome governed the Iberian peninsula, expanding and diversifying the economy, and extending trade with the Roman Empire. Indigenous peoples paid tribute to Rome through an intricate web of alliances and allegiances. The economy experienced a major production expansion, profiting from some of the best agricultural lands under Roman hegemony and fueled by roads, trade routes, and the minting of coins, which eased commercial transactions. Lusitania developed, driven by an intensive mining industry; fields explored included the Aljustrel mines (Vipasca), São Domingos, and Riotinto in the Iberian Pyrite Belt, which extended to Seville, and contained copper, silver, and gold. All mines belonged to the Roman Senate, and were operated by slaves.

Subsistence agriculture was replaced by large farming units (Roman villas) producing olive oil, cereals, and wine, and rearing livestock. This farming activity was located mainly in the region to the south of the Tagus River, the third largest grain-producing area in the Roman Empire.

There was also development in fishing activity, producing the valued garum or liquamen, a condiment obtained from the maceration of fish, preferably tuna and mackerel, exported throughout the entire empire. The largest producer of the entire Roman Empire was in Tróia Peninsula, near modern Setúbal, south of Lisbon. Remains of garum manufacturing plants show a sharp growth of the canning industry in Portugal, mainly on the coast of Algarve, but also in Póvoa de Varzim, Angeiras (Matosinhos), and the estuary of the Sado River, which made it one of the most important centers for canners in Hispania. At the same time, specialized industries also developed. The fish salting and canning in turn required the development of salt, shipbuilding, and ceramic industries, to facilitate the manufacture of amphorae and other containers that allowed the storage and transport of commodities such as oil, wine, cereals, and preserves.

=== Germanic rule ===
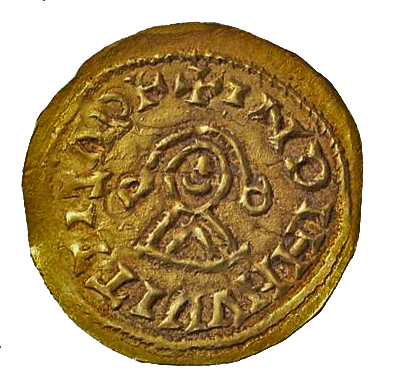
A golden triente minted at Braga during the reign of Wittiza and bearing his rough effigy.

With the decline of the Roman Empire, circa 410–418, Suebi and Visigoths took over the power vacuum left by Roman administrators and established themselves as nobility, with some degree of centralized power at their capitals in Braga and Toledo. Although it suffered some decline, Roman law remained in the Visigothic Code, and infrastructure, such as roads, bridges, aqueducts, and irrigation systems, was maintained to varying degrees. While trade dwindled in most of the former Roman lands in Europe, it survived to some degree in Visigothic Hispania.

=== Al-Andalus ===
In 711, Moors occupied large parts of the Iberian Peninsula, establishing the Al-Andalus. They maintained much of the Roman legacy; they repaired and extended Roman infrastructure, using it for irrigation, while introducing new agricultural practices and novel crops, such as sugar cane, rice, citrus fruit, apricots, and cotton. Trade flourished with effective systems of contract relied upon by merchants, who would buy and sell on commission, with money lent to them by wealthy investors, or a joint investment of several merchants, who were often Muslim, Christian, and Jewish.

Little is directly known from the economic structures of the region due to the paucity of Arab sources. It is however possible to advance a few assertions. The constant warfare between Muslims and Christians and among Muslims certainly costed the region dearly and must have participated to the rampant problems of underpopulation experienced by the Gharb Al-Andalus. As a matter of example, several attempts to repopulate the regions north of Coimbra to guarantee a line of defense against the Christian kingdom failed. The economy was heavily influenced both by structural Islamic habits (creation of cities) and the direction chosen by the dominating Muslim ruler of the Maghrib and al-Andalus. For instance, the great interest paid by the Almohad dynasty to the Atlantic helped develop the military and civilian (trade, fishery) activities of the western Iberian ports such as Sevilla, Lisbon, etc. Despite a general impression of sustained development, specially during the 10th and 11th centuries when the area witnessed a noticeable demographic expansion, the Gharb al-Andalus also underwent some dramatic episodes such as the great famine of 740 which decimated the Berber colonists of the Douro region.

Business partnerships would be made for many commercial ventures, and bonds of kinship enabled trade networks to form over huge distances. Muslims were involved in trade extending into Asia, and Muslim merchants traveled long distances for commercial activities. After 800 years of warfare, the Catholic kingdoms gradually became more powerful and eventually expelled the Moors from the peninsula. In the case of the Kingdom of Portugal it happened in the 13th century; in the Algarve. The combined forces of Portugal, Aragon and Castile defeated the last Iberian Muslim strongholds in the 15th century.

== Kingdom of Portugal ==
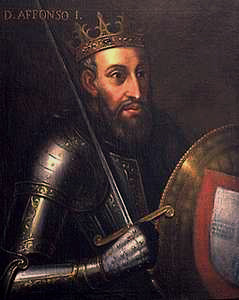
King Afonso I of Portugal.

In 1139, the Kingdom of Portugal achieved independence from the Kingdom of León, having doubled its area through the Reconquista (the reconquest of former Christian lands to the Muslim rulers established in the Iberian Peninsula) under Afonso Henriques, first King of Portugal. His successor, Sancho I, accumulated the first national treasury, and supported new industries and the middle class of merchants. Moreover, he created several new towns, such as Guarda in 1199, and took great care in populating remote areas.

=== Middle Ages ===
Starting in 1212, Afonso II of Portugal established the state's administration, designing the first set of Portuguese written laws. These were mainly concerned with private property, civil justice, and minting. He sent ambassadors to European kingdoms outside the Iberian Peninsula to begin commercial relations. The earliest references of commercial relations between Portugal and the County of Flanders document Portuguese attendance at Lille's fair in 1267. In 1297, with the Reconquista completed, King Denis pursued policies on legislation and centralization of power, adopting Portuguese as the official language. He encouraged the discovery and exploitation of sulphur, silver, tin, and iron mines, and organized for the export of surplus production to other European countries. On 10 May 1293, King Denis instituted the Bolsa de Comércio, a commercial fund for the defense of Portuguese traders in foreign ports, such as the County of Flanders, which were to pay certain sums according to tonnage, accrued to them when necessary. In 1308, he signed Portugal's first commercial agreement with England. He distributed land, promoted agriculture, organized communities of farmers and took a personal interest in the development of exports, founding and regulating regular markets in a number of towns. In 1317, he made a pact with the Genoese merchant sailor Manuel Pessanha (Pesagno), appointing him Admiral and giving him trade privileges with his homeland, in return for twenty warships and crews. The intention was the defense of the country against pirates, and it laid the basis for the Portuguese Navy and the establishment of a Genoese merchant community in Portugal.

Agriculture was Portugal's main activity, with produce mostly consumed internally. Wine and dried fruits from the Algarve (figs, grapes, and almonds) were sold in Flanders and England, salt from Setúbal and Aveiro was a profitable export to northern Europe, and leather and kermes, a scarlet dye, were also exported. Industry was minimal, and Portugal imported armor and munitions, fine clothes, and several manufactured products from Flanders and Italy. Since the 13th century, a monetary economy had been stimulated, but barter still dominated trade, and coinage was limited; foreign currency was also used until the beginning of the 15th century.

In the second half of the 14th century, outbreaks of bubonic plague led to severe depopulation: the economy was extremely localized in a few towns, and migration from the country led to land being abandoned to agriculture and resulted in rises in rural unemployment. Only the sea offered alternatives, with most populations settling in fishing and trading coastal areas.

Between 1325 and 1357, Afonso IV granted public funding to raise a proper commercial fleet and ordered the first maritime explorations, with the help of Genoese sailors under the command of admiral Manuel Pessanha. Forced to reduce their activities in the Black Sea, the Republic of Genoa had turned to the north African trade of wheat and olive oil (valued also as an energy source), and a search for gold, although they also visited the ports of Bruges (Flanders) and England. In 1341, the Canary Islands were officially discovered under the patronage of the Portuguese king, but in 1344 Castile disputed them, further propelling the development of the Portuguese navy.

To promote settlement, the Sesmarias law was issued in 1375, expropriating vacant lands and leasing it to unemployed cultivators, without great effect: by the end of the century, Portugal faced food shortages, having to import wheat from north Africa. After the 1383–1385 Crisis—combining a succession crisis, war with Castile, and Lisbon plagued by famine and anarchy—a newly elected Aviz dynasty, with strong links to England, marked an eclipse of the conservative land-oriented aristocracy.

=== Expansion of the Portuguese empire (15th and 16th centuries) ===
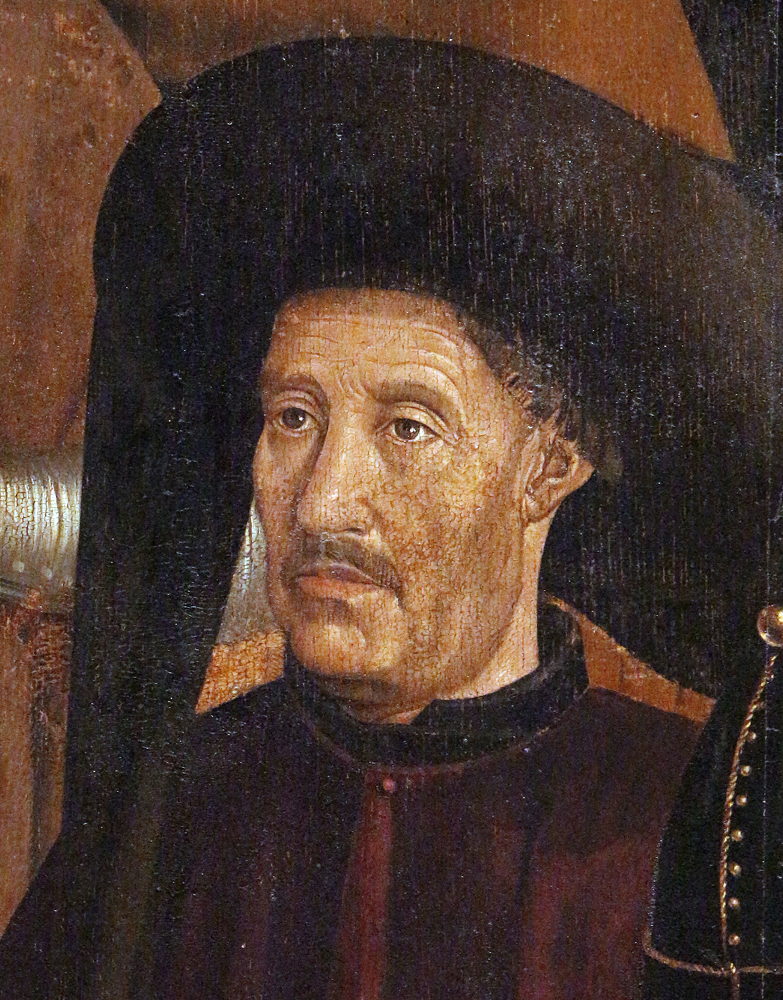
Henry the Navigator was an important figure in the early days of the Portuguese Empire, being responsible for the beginning of the European worldwide explorations and maritime trade.

In 1415, Ceuta was conquered by the Portuguese with the aim of controlling navigation of the African coast, expanding Christianity with the avail of the papacy, and providing the nobility with war. The king's son, Henry the Navigator, then became aware of the profitability of the Saharan trade routes. Governor of the rich 'Order of Christ' and holding valuable monopolies on resources in the Algarve, he sponsored voyages down the coast of Mauritania, gathering a group of merchants, shipowners, and stakeholders interested in the sea lanes. Later, his brother Prince Pedro granted him a "Royal Flush" of all profits from trading within the discovered areas. Soon the Atlantic islands of Madeira (1420) and Azores (1427) were reached and began to be settled, producing wheat for export to Portugal. By the beginning of the reign of King Duarte I in 1433, the Real became the currency unit in Portugal, and remained so up to the 20th century.

In January 1430, Princess Isabella of Portugal married Philip III, Duke of Burgundy, Artur Côrte-Real, Count of Flanders. Around 2,000 Portuguese accompanied her, developing great activity in trade and finance in what was then the richest European court. With Portuguese support, Bruges shipyard was started, and in 1438 the Duke granted the Portuguese traders the opportunity to elect consuls with legal powers, thus giving full civil jurisdiction to the Portuguese community. In 1445, the Portuguese Feitoria of Bruges was built.

In 1443, Prince Pedro, Henry's brother, granted him the monopoly of navigation, war, and trade in the lands south of Cape Bojador. Later, this monopoly would be enforced by the Papal bulls Dum Diversas (1452) and Romanus Pontifex (1455), granting Portugal the trade monopoly for the newly discovered lands.

When the Portuguese first sailed down the Atlantic, extending their influence on coastal Africa, they were interested in gold. Trade in sub-Saharan Africa was controlled by Muslims, who controlled trans-Saharan trade routes for salt, kola, textiles, fish, and grain, and engaged in the Arab slave trade.

To attract Muslim traders along the routes traveled in North Africa, the first factory trading post was built in 1445 on the island of Arguin, off the coast of Mauritania. Portuguese merchants accessed the interior via the Senegal River and Gambia River, which bisected long-standing trans-Saharan routes. They brought in copperware, cloth, tools, wine, and horses, and later included arms and ammunition. In exchange, they received gold from the mines of Akan, Guinea pepper (a trade which lasted until Vasco da Gama reached India in 1498), and ivory. The expanding market opportunities in Europe and the Mediterranean resulted in increased trade across the Sahara. There was a very small market for African slaves as domestic workers in Europe, and as workers on the sugar plantations of the Mediterranean and later Madeira. The Portuguese found they could make considerable amounts of gold by transporting slaves from one trading post to another, along the Atlantic coast of Africa: Muslim merchants had a high demand for slaves, which were used as porters on the trans-Saharan routes, and for sale in the Islamic Empire.

=== Atlantic Islands' sugar trade ===
Expansion of sugar cane agriculture in Madeira's captaincies started in 1455, using advisers from Sicily and (largely) the Genoese capital to produce the "sweet salt" rare in Europe. Already cultivated in Algarve, the accessibility of Madeira attracted Genoese and Flemish traders keen to bypass Venetian monopolies. Sugarcane production became a leading factor in the island's economy, and the establishment of plantations on Madeira, the Canary Islands, and the Cape Verde Islands increased the demand for labor. Rather than trading slaves back to Muslim merchants, there was an emerging market for agricultural workers on the plantations. By 1500, the Portuguese had transported approximately 81,000 slaves to these various markets, and the proportion of imported slaves in Madeira reached 10% of the total population by the 16th century. By 1480, Antwerp had some 70 ships engaged in the Madeira sugar trade, with refining and distribution concentrated in the city. By the 1490s, Madeira had overtaken Cyprus in the production of sugar, and the success of sugar merchants such as Bartolomeo Marchionni would propel the investment in exploratory travel.

=== Guinean gold ===
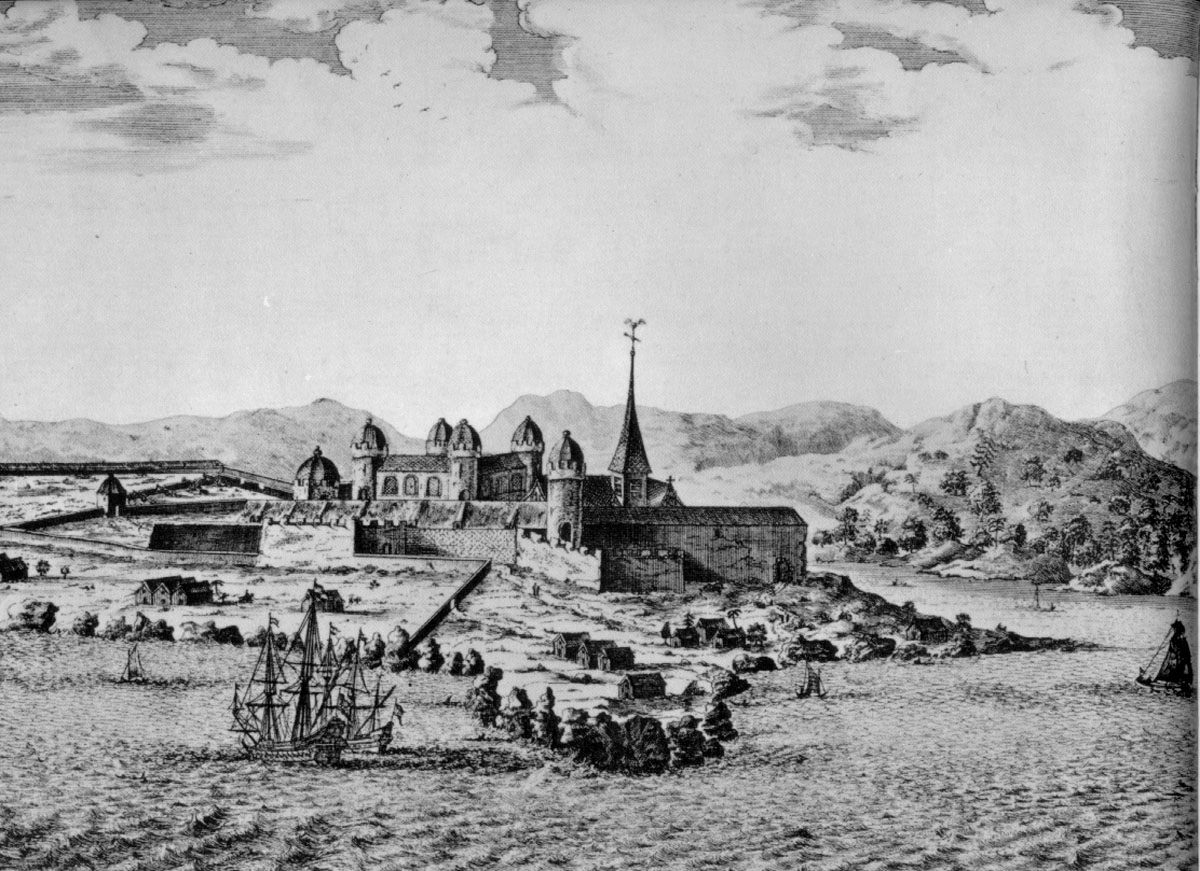
Elmina Castle viewed from the sea in 1668.

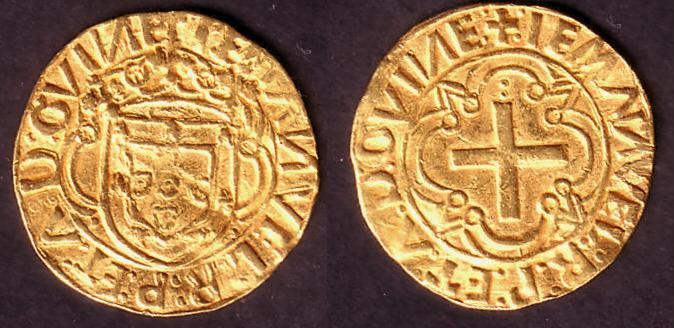
Gold Cruzado minted during King Manuel I of Portugal's reign (1495–1521)

In 1469, responding to meager returns from African explorations, King Afonso V granted monopoly of trade in part of the Gulf of Guinea to the merchant Fernão Gomes. For an annual rent of 200,000 reais, Gomes was to explore 100 leagues of the coast of Africa annually, for five years (later the agreement would be extended for another year). He gained monopoly trading rights for a popular substitute of black pepper, then called "malagueta", the guinea pepper (Aframomum melegueta), for another yearly payment of 100,000 reais. The Portuguese found Muslim merchants entrenched along the African coast as far as the Bight of Benin. The slave coast, as the Bight of Benin was known, was reached by the Portuguese at the start of the 1470s. It was not until they reached the Kingdom of Kongo's coast in the 1480s that they exceeded Muslim trading territory.

Under Gomes' sponsorship, the equator was crossed and the islands of the Gulf of Guinea were reached, including São Tomé and Príncipe.

On the coast, Gomes found a thriving alluvial gold trade among the natives and visiting Arab and Berber traders at the port then named A Mina (meaning "the mine"), where he established a trading post. Trade between Elmina and Portugal grew over the next decade. The port became a major trading center for gold and slaves purchased from local African peoples along the slave rivers of Benin. Using his profits from African trade, Fernão Gomes assisted the Portuguese king in the conquests of Asilah, Alcácer Ceguer, and Tangier in Morocco.

Given the large profits, in 1482 the newly crowned king John II ordered a factory to be built in Elmina, to manage the local gold industry: Elmina Castle. São Jorge da Mina Factory centralized trade, which was held again as a royal monopoly. The Company of Guinea was founded in Lisbon as a government institution that was to deal with trade and fix the prices of the goods.

15th-century Portuguese exploration of the African coast is commonly regarded as the harbinger of European colonialism, and marked the beginning of the Atlantic slave trade, Christian missionary evangelization, and the first globalization processes, which were to become a major element of European colonialism until the end of the 18th century. By the beginning of the colonial era there were forty forts operating along the coast. They acted mainly as trading posts and rarely saw military action, but the fortifications were important, as arms and ammunition were being stored prior to trade.

=== Spice trade ===
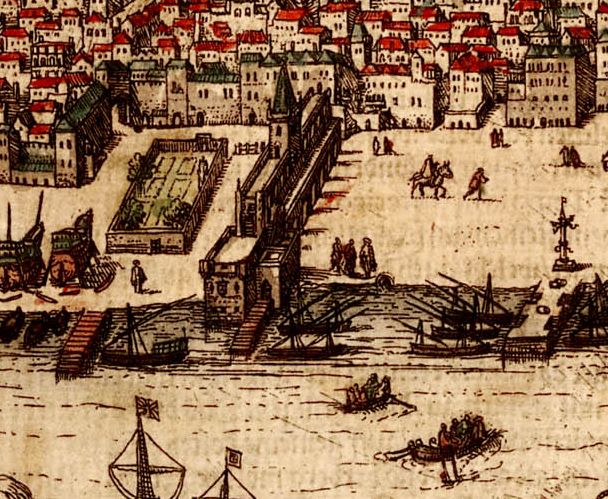
16th century drawing of Lisbon's downtown showing Ribeira Palace where Casa da Índia (House of India) was located.

The profitable eastern spice trade was cornered by the Portuguese in the 16th century. In 1498, Vasco da Gama's pioneering voyage reached India by sea, opening the first European direct trade in the Indian Ocean. Up to this point, spice imports to Europe had been brought overland through India and Arabia, based on mixed land and sea routes through the Persian Gulf, Red Sea, and caravans, and then across the Mediterranean by the Venetians for distribution in Western Europe, which had a virtual monopoly on these valuable commodities. By establishing these trade routes, Portugal undercut the Venetian trade with its abundance of middlemen.

The Republic of Venice had gained control over much of the trade routes between Europe and Asia. After traditional land routes to India had been closed by the Ottoman Turks, Portugal hoped to use the sea route pioneered by Gama to break the Venetian trading monopoly. Portugal aimed to control trade within the Indian Ocean and secure the sea routes linking Europe to Asia. This new sea route around the Cape of Good Hope was firmly secured for Portugal by the activities of Afonso de Albuquerque, who was appointed the Portuguese viceroy of India in 1508. Early Portuguese explorers established bases in Portuguese Mozambique and Zanzibar and oversaw the construction of forts and factories (trading posts) along the African coast, in the Indian subcontinent, and other places in Asia, which solidified the Portuguese hegemony.

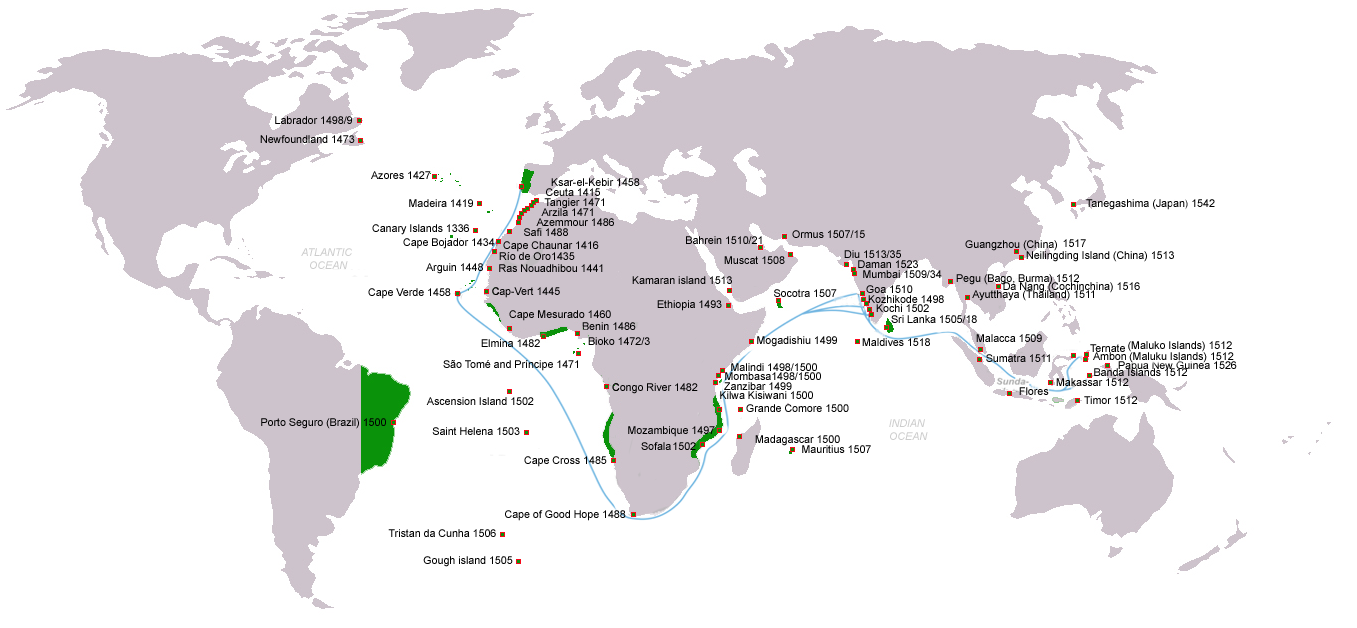
Portuguese discoveries, explorations, conquests and overseas settlements by the 16th century.

At Lisbon the Casa da Índia (House of India) was the central organization that managed all Portuguese trade overseas under royal monopoly during the 15th and 16th centuries. Established around 1500, it was the successor of the House of Guinea, the House of Guinea and Mina, and the House of Mina (respectively, the Casa da Guiné, Casa de Guiné e Mina, and Casa da Mina in Portuguese). Casa da Índia maintained a royal monopoly on the trade in pepper, cloves, and cinnamon, and levied a 30 percent tax on the profits of other articles.

The export and distribution to Europe was made by the Portuguese factory in Antwerp. For about thirty years, from 1503 to 1535, the Portuguese cut into the Venetian spice trade in the eastern Mediterranean. By 1510, King Manuel I of Portugal was pocketing a million cruzados yearly from the spice trade alone, and this led François I of France to dub Manuel I "le roi épicier", meaning "the grocer king".

In 1506, about 65% of the state income was produced by taxes on overseas activity. Income started to decline mid-century because of the costs of maintaining a presence in Morocco and domestic waste. Also, Portugal did not develop a substantial domestic infrastructure to support this activity, but relied on foreigners for many services supporting their trading enterprises, and therefore a lot of money was consumed in this way. In 1549, the Portuguese trade center in Antwerp went bankrupt and was closed. As the throne became more overextended in the 1550s, it increasingly relied on foreign financing. By about 1560, the income of the Casa da Índia was not able to cover its expenses.

=== Triangular trade between China, Japan, and Europe ===
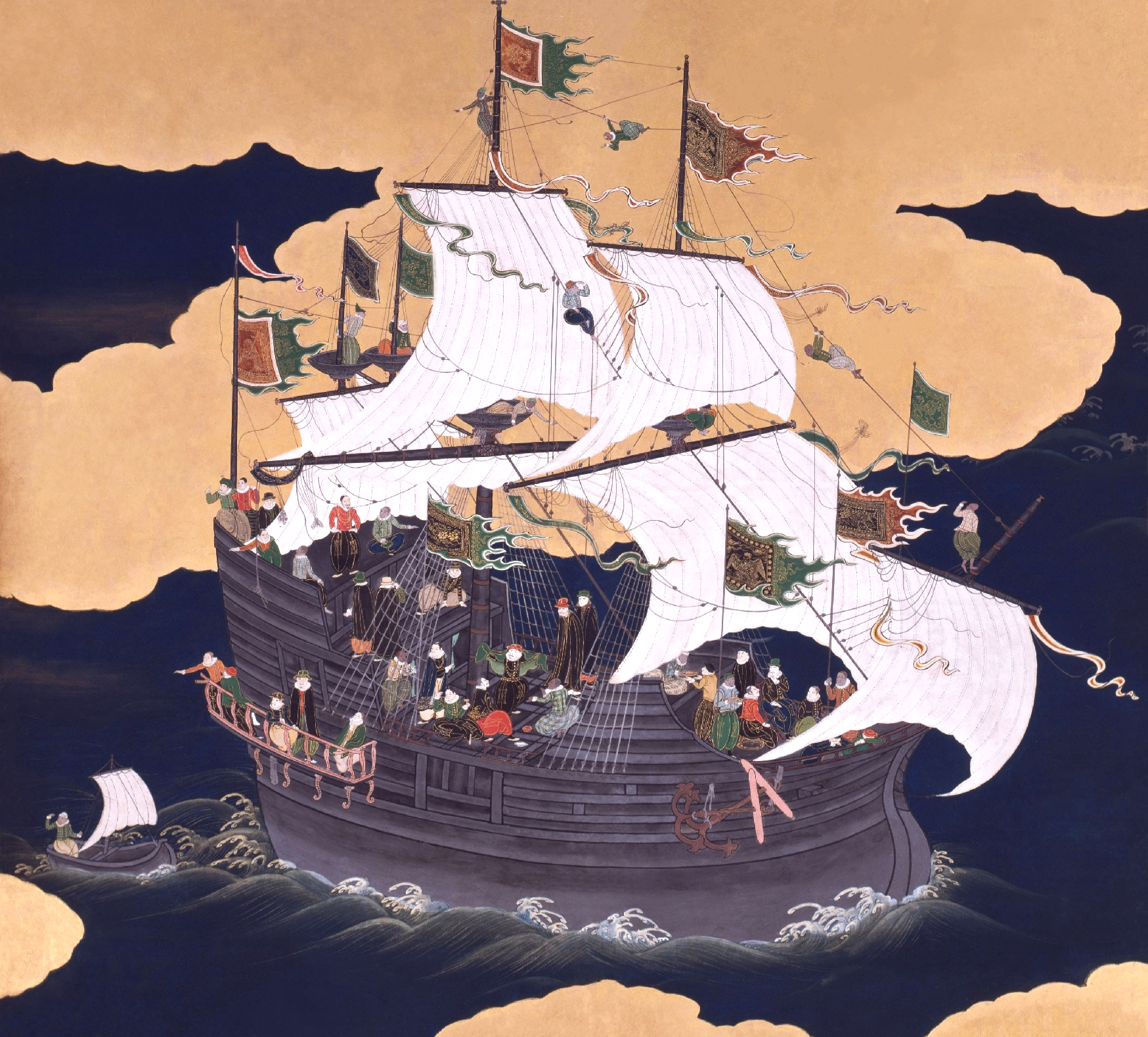
A Portuguese carrack in Nagasaki, 17th century.

Goa had functioned from the start as the capital of Portuguese India, the central shipping base of a commercial net linking Lisbon, Malacca, and as far as China and the Maluku Islands (Ternate) since 1513.

The first official visit of Fernão Pires de Andrade to Guangzhou (1517–1518) was fairly successful, and the local Chinese authorities allowed the embassy led by Tomé Pires, brought by de Andrade's flotilla, to proceed to Beijing.

In 1542, Portuguese traders arrived in Japan. According to Fernão Mendes Pinto, who claimed to have been present in this first contact, they arrived at Tanegashima, where locals were impressed by firearms that would be immediately made by the Japanese on a large scale. The arrival of the Portuguese in Japan in 1543 initiated the Nanban trade period, with the hosts adopting several technologies and cultural practices, such as the arquebus, European-style cuirasses, European ships, Christianity, decorative art, and language. In 1570, after an agreement between Jesuits and a local daimyō, the Portuguese were granted a Japanese port where they founded the city of Nagasaki, thus creating a trading center which for many years was Japan's main gateway to the world.

Soon after, in 1557, Portuguese merchants established a colony on the island of Macau. Chinese authorities allowed the Portuguese to settle through an annual payment, creating a warehouse. After the Chinese banned direct trade by Chinese merchants with Japan, the Portuguese filled this commercial vacuum as intermediaries. Engaging in the triangular trade between China, Japan, and Europe, the Portuguese bought Chinese silk and sold it to the Japanese in return for Japanese-mined silver; since silver was more highly valued in China, the Portuguese could then use their newly acquired metal to buy even larger stocks of Chinese silk. However, by 1573, after the Spanish established a trading base in Manila, the Portuguese intermediary trade was trumped by the prime source of incoming silver to China from the Spanish Americas.

Guarding its trade from European and Asian competitors, Portugal dominated not only the trade between Asia and Europe, but also much of the trade between different regions of Asia, such as India, Indonesia, China, and Japan. Jesuit missionaries, such as the Basque Francis Xavier, followed the Portuguese to spread Roman Catholicism to Asia, with mixed results.

=== Expansion in South America ===
Portuguese map by Lopo Homem (c. 1519) showing the coast of Brazil and natives extracting brazilwood, as well as Portuguese ships.

During the 16th century, Portugal also started to colonize its newly discovered territory of Brazil. However, temporary trading posts were established earlier to collect Brazilwood, used as a dye, and with permanent settlements came the establishment of the sugar cane industry and its intensive labor. Several early settlements were founded, among them the colonial capital, Salvador, established in 1549 at the Bay of All Saints in the north, and the city of Rio de Janeiro in the south, in March 1567. The Portuguese colonists adopted an economy based on the production of agricultural goods that were exported to Europe. Sugar became by far the most important Brazilian colonial product until the early 18th century, when gold and other minerals assumed a higher importance.

The first attempt to establish a Portuguese presence in Brazil was made by John III in 1533. His solution was simplistic; he divided the coastline into fifteen sections, each about 150 miles long, and granted these strips of land, on a hereditary basis, to fifteen courtiers, who become known as donatários. Each courtier was told that he and his heirs could found cities, grant land, and levy taxes over as much territory as they could colonize inland from their stretch of coastline. Only two of the donatários were to have any success in this venture. In the 1540s, John III was forced to change his policy. He placed Brazil under direct royal control (as in Spanish America) and appointed a governor general. The first governor general of Brazil arrived in 1549 and headquartered himself at Bahia (today known as Salvador). It remained the capital of Portuguese Brazil for more than two centuries, until replaced by Rio de Janeiro in 1763.

The economic strength of Portuguese Brazil derived at first from sugar plantations in the north, established as early as the 1530s by one of the two successful donatários. But from the late 17th century onward, Brazil benefited at last from the mineral wealth which underpinned Spanish America. Gold was found in 1693 in the southern inland region of Minas Gerais. The discovery set off the first great gold rush of the Americas, opening up the interior as prospectors swarmed westwards, and underpinning Brazil's economy for much of the 18th century. Diamonds were also discovered in large quantities in the same region in the 18th century.

Colonists gradually moved west into the interior. Accompanying the first governor general in 1549 were members of the newly founded order of Jesuits. In their mission to convert the Indians, they were often the first European presence in new regions far from the coast. They frequently clashed with adventurers also pressing inland (in great expeditions known as bandeiras) to find silver and gold or to capture Indians as slaves. These two groups, with their very different motives, brought a Portuguese presence far beyond the Tordesillas Line. By the late 17th century, the territory of Brazil encompassed the entire basin of the Amazon as far west as the Andes. At the same time, Portuguese colonists had moved south along the coast beyond Rio de Janeiro. The Portuguese Colony of Sacramento was established on the River Plate in 1680, provoking a century of Spanish-Portuguese border conflicts in what is now Uruguay. Meanwhile, the use of the Portuguese language gradually gave the central region of South America an identity and a culture distinct from that of its Spanish neighbours.

=== Expansion in sub-Saharan Africa ===
Flag of the Company of Guinea established in the 15th century.

After initiating the European slave trade in Sub-Saharan Africa through its involvement in the African slave trade, Portugal played a decreasing role in it over the next few centuries. Although they were the first Europeans to establish trading settlements in Sub-Saharan Africa, they failed to press home their advantage. Nevertheless, they retained a clear presence in the three regions which received their particular attention during the original age of exploration. The closest of these, on the sea journey from Portugal, was Portuguese Guinea, known also, from its main economic activity, as the Slave Coast. The local African rulers in Guinea, who prospered greatly from the slave trade, had no interest in allowing the Europeans to move any further inland than the fortified coastal settlements where the trading took place. In the 15th century, Portugal's Company of Guinea was one of the first chartered commercial companies established by Europeans in other continents during the Age of Discovery. The Company's task was to deal with the spices and to fix the prices of the goods. The Portuguese presence in Guinea was largely limited to the port of Bissau. For a brief period in the 1790s, the British attempted to establish a rival foothold on an offshore island, at Bolama. By the 19th century, however, the Portuguese were sufficiently secure in Bissau to regard the neighbouring coastline as their own special territory.

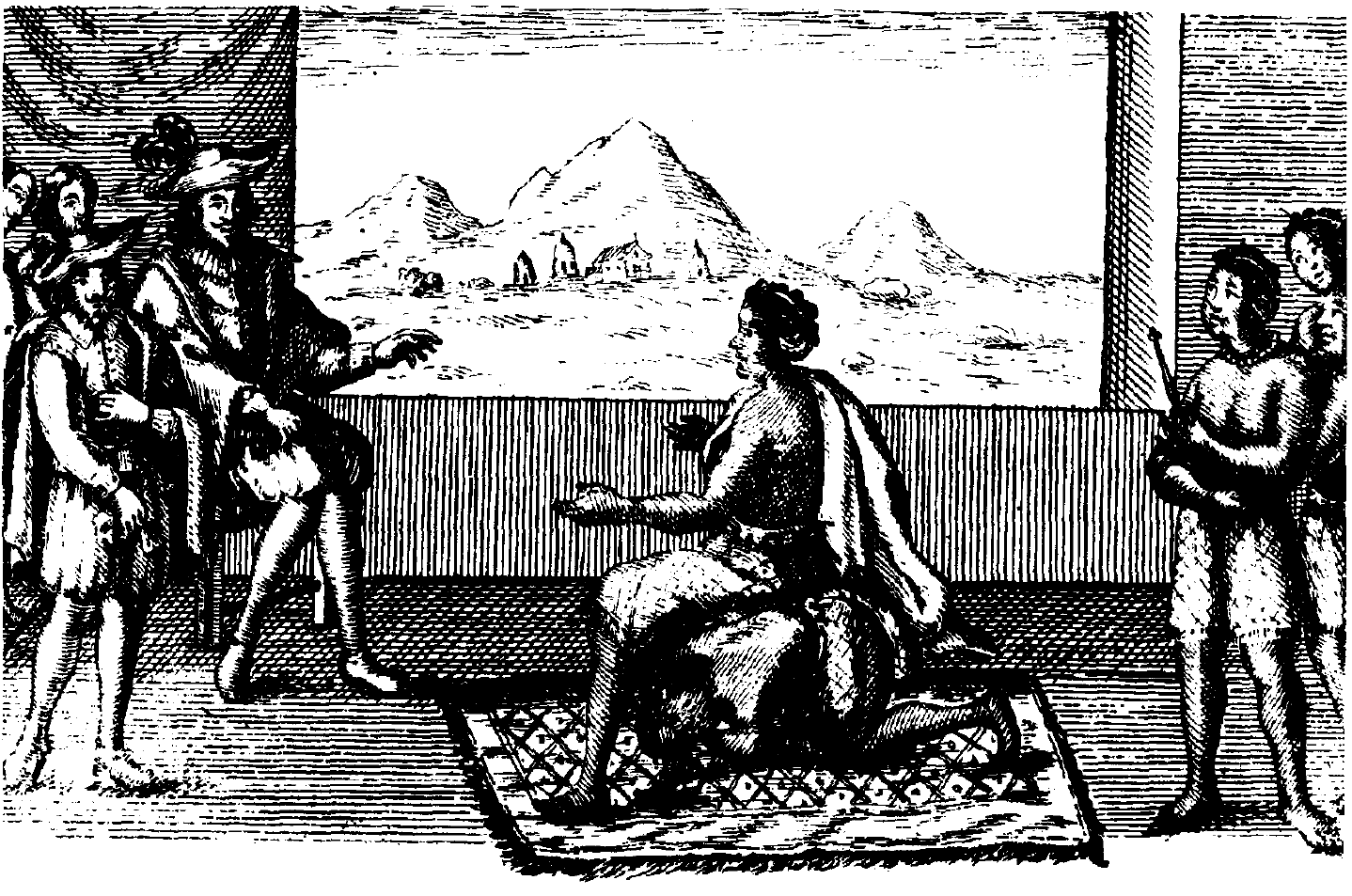
Queen Nzinga in peace negotiations with the Portuguese governor in Luanda, 1657.

Thousands of miles down the coast, in Angola, the Portuguese found it harder to consolidate their early advantage against encroachments by Dutch, British, and French rivals. Nevertheless, the fortified Portuguese towns of Luanda (established in 1587 with 400 Portuguese settlers) and Benguela (a fort from 1587, a town from 1617) remained almost continuously in their hands. As in Guinea, the slave trade became the basis of the local economy, with raids carried ever further inland by local natives to gain captives. More than a million men, women, and children were shipped from this region across the Atlantic. In this region, unlike Guinea, the trade remained largely in Portuguese hands. Nearly all the slaves who came from this area were destined for Brazil.

The deepest Portuguese penetration into the continent was from the east coast, up the Zambezi, with an early settlement as far inland as Tete. This was a region of powerful and rich African kingdoms. The eastern coastal area was also much visited by Arabs pressing south from Oman and Zanzibar. From the 16th to 19th centuries the Portuguese and their merchants were just one among many rival groups competing for the local trade in gold, ivory, and slaves.

Even if the Portuguese hold on these three African regions was tenuous, they clearly remained the main European presence in Sub-Saharan Africa. It was natural to assert their claim, therefore, in all three regions when the scramble for Africa began later. Prolonged military campaigns were required to retain and impose Portuguese control over the Africans in these territories in the late 19th century. The boundaries of Portuguese Guinea were agreed upon in two stages in 1886 with France, the colonial power in neighbouring Senegal and Guinea. No other nation presented a challenge for the vast and relatively unprofitable area of Angola. The most likely scene of conflict was Portuguese East Africa, where Portugal's hope of linking up with Angola clashed with Britain's plans for the Rhodesias. There was a diplomatic crisis in 1890, but the borders between British and Portuguese colonies were agreed upon by treaty in 1891.

=== Decline: 17th to 19th century ===
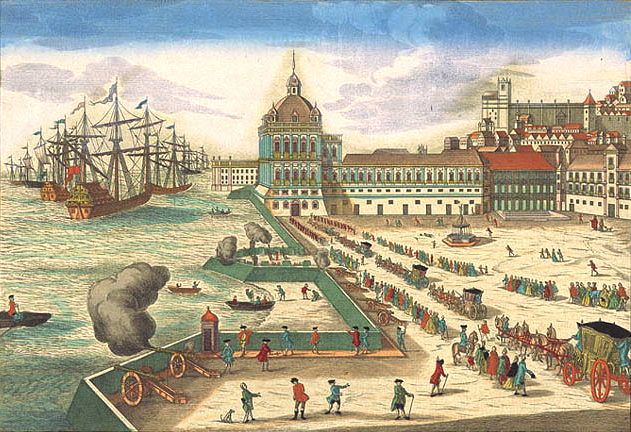
Ribeira Palace where Casa da Índia (House of India) was located, first half of the 18th century, Lisbon.

During the 15th and 16th centuries, with its global empire that included possessions in Africa, Asia, South America, and Oceania, Portugal remained one of the world's major economic, political, and cultural powers. English, Dutch, and French interests in and around Portugal's well-established overseas possessions and trading outposts tested Portuguese commercial and colonizing hegemony in Asia, Africa, and the New World. In the 17th century, the lengthy Portuguese Restoration War (1640–1668) between Portugal and Spain ended the sixty-year period of the Iberian Union (1580–1640). According to a 2016 study, Portugal's colonial trade "had a substantial and increasingly positive impact on [Portugal's] economic growth". Despite its vast colonial possessions, Portugal's economy declined relative to other advanced European economies from the 17th century and onward, which the study attributes to the domestic conditions of the Portuguese economy.

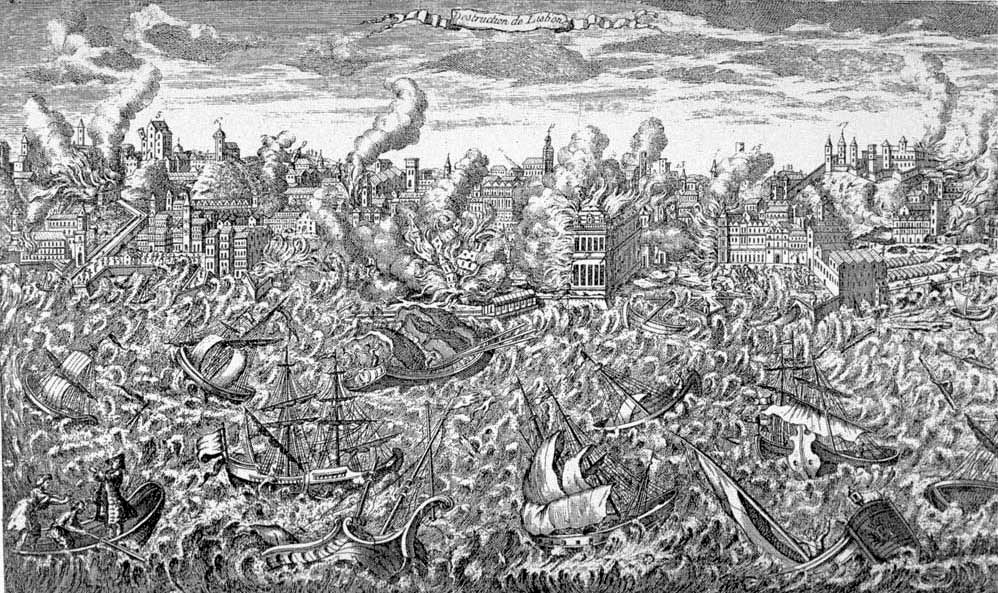
This 1755 copper engraving shows the ruins of Lisbon in flames and a tsunami overwhelming the ships in the harbor.

The 1755 Lisbon earthquake and, in the 19th century, armed conflicts with French and Spanish invading forces first in the War of the Oranges in 1801, and from 1807 in the Peninsular War, as well as the loss of its largest territorial possession abroad, Brazil, disrupted political stability and potential economic growth. The Scramble for Africa during the 19th century pressed the country to divert larger investments into the continent to secure its interests there.

By the late 19th century, the country's resources were exhausted by its overstretched empire, which was now facing unprecedented competition. Portugal had one of the highest illiteracy rates in Western Europe, a lack of industrialization, and underdeveloped transportation systems. The Industrial Revolution, which had spread out across several other European countries, creating more advanced and wealthier societies, was almost forgotten in Portugal. Under the rule of Carlos I, the penultimate King of Portugal, the country was twice declared bankrupt—on 14 June 1892, and 10 May 1902—causing socio-economic disturbances, socialist and republican antagonism, and press criticism of the monarchy. However, it was during this period that the predecessor of the Lisbon Stock Exchange was created in 1769 as the Assembleia dos Homens de Negócio in Praça do Comércio Square, in Lisbon's city center. In 1891, the Bolsa de Valores do Porto (Porto Stock Exchange) in Porto was founded. The Portuguese colonies in Africa started a period of great economic development fuelled by ambitious Chartered Companies and a new wave of colonization.

Today, the decline of the Portuguese economy is still traceable via anthropometric indicators, i.e. height. To this day, the Portuguese are the shortest Europeans. This divergence began during the 1840s and increased significantly during the 1870s. Two significant causes for this development can be identified. Firstly, Portugal's real wage evolution was slow as a result of comparatively late industrialization and slow economic growth performance. Secondly, scant investments into education led to delayed human capital formation (in comparison with other European countries). The thus arising welfare deficit can be associated with the stagnating heights of the Portuguese.

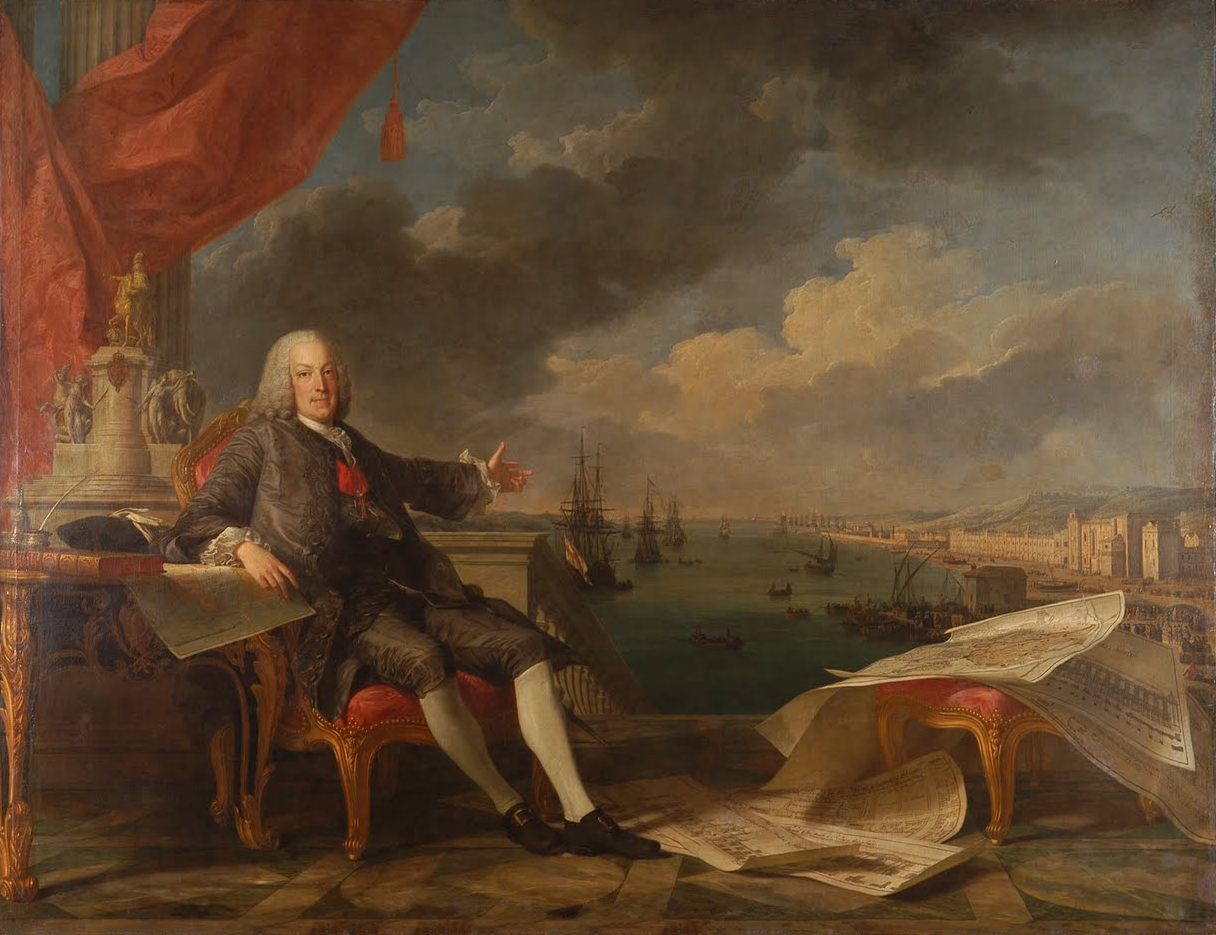
Sebastião José de Carvalho e Melo, Marquis of Pombal, "The Expulsion of the Jesuits" by Louis-Michel van Loo and Claude-Joseph Vernet, 1766.

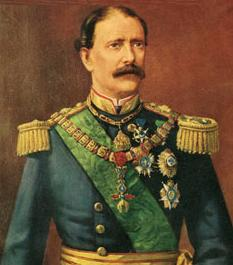
Minister Fontes Pereira de Melo.

== The Portuguese Republic ==
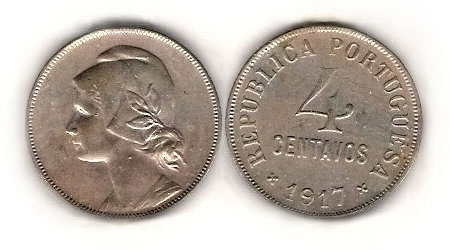
4 centavos 1917 – after the Republican revolution a new currency was adopted: Portuguese escudo replaced the real at the rate of 1,000 réis to 1 escudo

On 1 February 1908, King Carlos I was assassinated while travelling to Lisbon. Manuel II became the new king, but was eventually overthrown during the revolution on 5 October 1910, which abolished the monarchy and instated republicanism.

Along with new national symbols, a new currency was adopted. The "escudo" was introduced on 22 May 1911 to replace the real (Portuguese for "royal"), at the rate of 1,000 réis to 1 escudo. The escudo's value was initially set at 4$50 escudos = 1 pound sterling, but after 1914 its value fell, being fixed in 1928 at 108$25 to the pound. This was altered to 110$00 escudos to the pound in 1931.

Portugal's First Republic (1910–26) became, in the words of historian Douglas L. Wheeler, "midwife to Europe's longest surviving authoritarian system". Under the sixteen-year parliamentary regime of the republic, with its forty-five governments, growing fiscal deficits, financed by money creation and foreign borrowing, climaxed in hyper-inflation, all made possible by the introduction of paper money after leaving the gold standard as did many other countries during the First World War, and a moratorium on Portugal's external debt service. The cost of living around 1926 was thirty times higher than what it had been in 1914. Fiscal imprudence and accelerating inflation gave way to massive capital flight, crippling domestic investment. Burgeoning public sector employment during the First Republic was accompanied by a perverse shrinkage in the share of the industrial labor force in total employment. Although some headway was made toward increasing the level of literacy, 68.1 percent of Portugal's population was still classified as illiterate by the 1930 census.

=== The economy under the Estado Novo regime ===
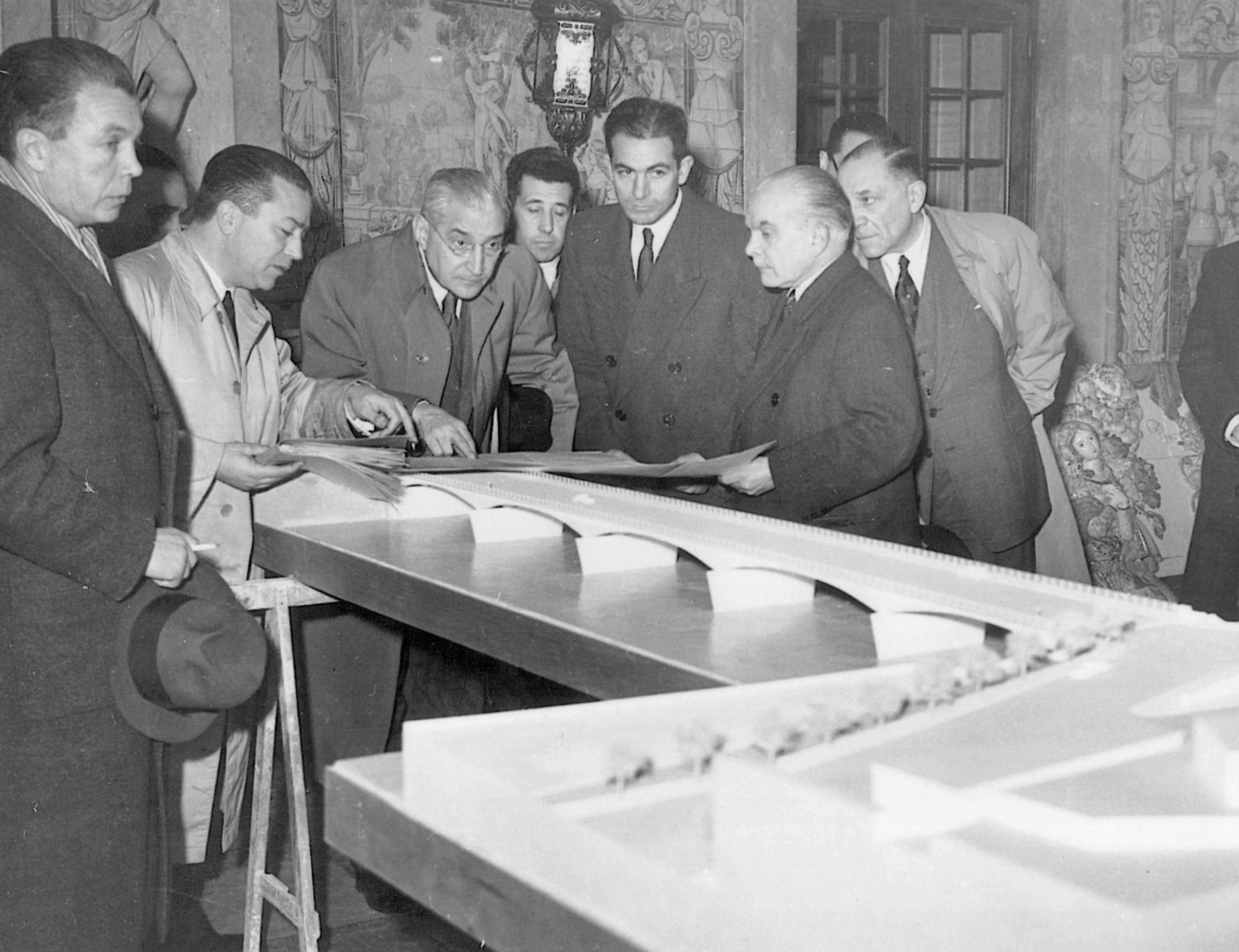
Salazar observing Edgar Cardoso's Santa Clara Bridge maquette in Coimbra.

The First Republic was ended by a military coup in May 1926, but the newly installed government failed to fix the nation's precarious financial situation. Instead, President Óscar Fragoso Carmona invited António de Oliveira Salazar to head the Ministry of Finance, and the latter agreed to accept the position provided he would have veto power over all fiscal expenditures. At the time of his appointment in 1928, Salazar held the Chair of Economics at the Law School of the University of Coimbra and was considered by his peers to be Portugal's most distinguished authority on inflation. For forty years, first as minister of finance (1928–32) and then as prime minister (1932–68), Salazar's political and economic doctrines shaped the progress of the country.

From the perspective of the financial chaos of the republican period, it was not surprising that Salazar considered the principles of a balanced budget and monetary stability as categorical imperatives. By restoring equilibrium, both in the fiscal budget and in the balance of international payments, Salazar succeeded in restoring Portugal's credit worthiness at home and abroad. Because Portugal's fiscal accounts from the 1930s until the early 1960s almost always had a surplus in the current account, the state had the wherewithal to finance public infrastructure projects without resorting either to inflationary financing or borrowing abroad.

At the nadir of the Great Depression, Premier Salazar laid the foundations for his Estado Novo, the "New State". Neither capitalist nor communist, Portugal's economy was quasi-traditional. The corporative framework within which the Portuguese economy evolved combined two salient characteristics: extensive state regulation and predominantly private ownership of the means of production. Leading financiers and industrialists accepted extensive bureaucratic controls in return for assurances of minimal public ownership of economic enterprises and certain monopolistic (or restricted-competition) privileges.

Within this framework, the state exercised extensive de facto authority regarding private investment decisions and the level of wages. A system of industrial licensing ('condicionamento' industrial), introduced by law in 1931, required prior authorization from the state for setting up or relocating an industrial plant. Investment in machinery and equipment, designed to increase the capacity of an existing firm, also required government approval. The political system was ostensibly corporatist, as political scientist Howard J. Wiarda makes clear: "In reality both labor and capital—and indeed the entire corporate institutional network—were subordinate to the central state apparatus."

Under the old regime, Portugal's private sector was dominated by some forty prominent families. These industrial dynasties were allied by marriage with the large, traditional landowning families of the nobility, who held most of the arable land in the southern part of the country in large estates. Many of these dynasties had business interests in Portuguese Africa. Within this elite group, the top ten families owned all the important commercial banks, which in turn controlled a disproportionate share of the economy. Because bank officials were often members of the boards of directors of borrowing firms in whose stock the banks participated, the influence of the large banks extended to a host of commercial, industrial, and service enterprises. Portugal's shift toward a moderately outward-looking trade and financial strategy, initiated in the late 1950s, gained momentum during the early 1960s. Until that time the country remained very poor and largely underdeveloped; although the country had a disadvantaged starting position, three decades of the Estado Novo regime had done no better than slightly increasing the country's GDP per capita from 36 percent of EC-12 average in 1930 to 39 percent in 1960. By the late 1950s, a growing number of industrialists, as well as government technocrats, favored greater Portuguese integration with the industrial countries to the north, as a badly needed stimulus to Portugal's economy. The influence of the Europe-oriented technocrats was rising within Salazar's cabinet. This was confirmed by the substantial increase in the foreign investment component in projected capital formation between the first (1953–58) and second (1959–64) economic development plans; the first plan called for a foreign investment component of less than 6 percent, but the latter envisioned a 25 percent contribution.

EFTA member states since 1995. Former member states, now EU member states. Portugal joined the then EEC in 1986 (now the EU), leaving the EFTA where it was a founding member in 1960.

==== A small economic miracle (1961–1974) ====
During the 1940s and 1950s, Portugal had experienced some economic growth due to increased raw material exports to the war-ravaged and recovering nations of Europe. Until the 1960s, however, the country remained very poor and largely underdeveloped due to its disadvantaged starting position and lack of effective policies to counter that situation. Salazar managed to discipline the Portuguese public finances, after the chaotic First Portuguese Republic of 1910–1926, but consistent economic growth and development remained scarce until well into the 1960s, when due to the influence of a new generation of technocrats with background in economics and technical-industrial know-how, the Portuguese economy started to take off with visible accomplishments in the people's quality of life and standard of living, as well as in terms of secondary and post-secondary education attainment. The newly influential Europe-oriented industrial and technical groups persuaded Salazar that Portugal should become a charter member of the European Free Trade Association (EFTA) when it was organized in 1959.

The resulting European economic integration, consisting, among other factors, in relatively free markets that facilitated the bridging of labour shortages through migration from Portugal, as well as other southern European countries (such as Italy, Spain or Greece,) towards Central Europe (e.g. Germany) – so-called 'Gastarbeiter' – initiated and strengthened the impressive European economic growth that also affected Portugal. Moreover, capital shortages did not affect economies as negatively as earlier since capital could be moved across borders more easily. In the following year, Portugal also became a member of the General Agreement on Tariffs and Trade (GATT), the International Monetary Fund, and the World Bank.

In 1958, when the Portuguese government announced the 1959–64 Six-Year Plan for National Development, a decision had been reached to accelerate the country's rate of economic growth, a decision whose urgency grew with the outbreak of guerrilla warfare in Angola in 1961 and in Portugal's other African territories thereafter. Salazar and his policy advisers recognized that additional military expenditure needs, as well as increased transfers of official investment to the "overseas provinces", could only be met by a sharp rise in the country's productive capacity. Salazar's commitment to preserving Portugal's "multiracial, pluricontinental" state led him reluctantly to seek external credits beginning in 1962, an action from which the Portuguese treasury had abstained for several decades.

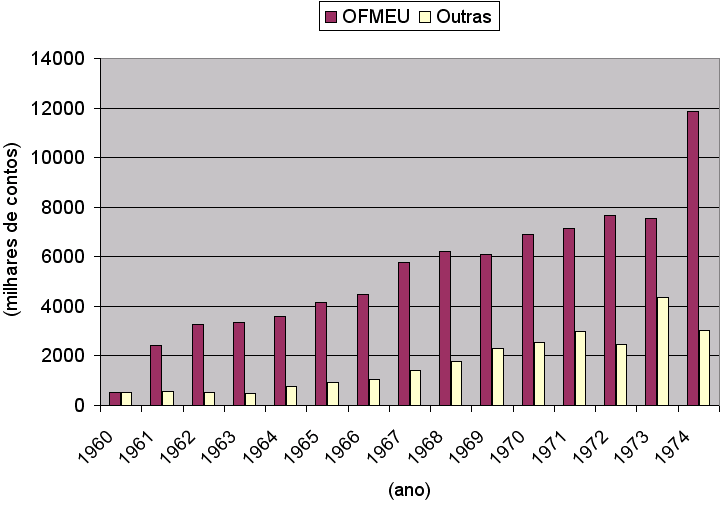
Portuguese Military Expenses during the Portuguese Colonial War: OFMEU – National Budget for Overseas Military Expenses; * conto – popular expression for "1000 $ (PTE)".

Beyond military measures, the official Portuguese response to the "winds of change" in the African colonies was to integrate them administratively and economically more closely with the mainland. This was accomplished through population and capital transfers, trade liberalization, and the creation of a common currency, the so-called Escudo Area. The integration program established in 1961 provided for the removal of Portugal's duties on imports from its overseas territories by January 1964. The latter, on the other hand, were permitted to continue to levy duties on goods imported from Portugal but at a preferential rate, in most cases 50 percent of the normal duties levied by the territories on goods originating outside the Escudo Area. The effect of this two-tier tariff system was to give Portugal's exports preferential access to its colonial markets. The economies of the overseas provinces, especially those of both the Overseas Province of Angola and Mozambique, boomed.

Portuguese overseas territories in Africa during the Estado Novo regime: Angola and Mozambique were by far the two largest of those territories.

Despite the opposition to protectionist interests, the Portuguese government succeeded in bringing about some liberalization of the industrial licensing system, as well as in reducing trade barriers to conform with EFTA and GATT agreements. The last years of the Salazar era witnessed the creation of important privately organized ventures, including an integrated iron and steel mill, a modern ship repair and shipbuilding complex, vehicle assembly plants, oil refineries, petrochemical plants, pulp and paper mills, and electronic plants. As economist Valentim Xavier Pintado observed, "Behind the facade of an aged Salazar, Portugal knew deep and lasting changes during the 1960s."

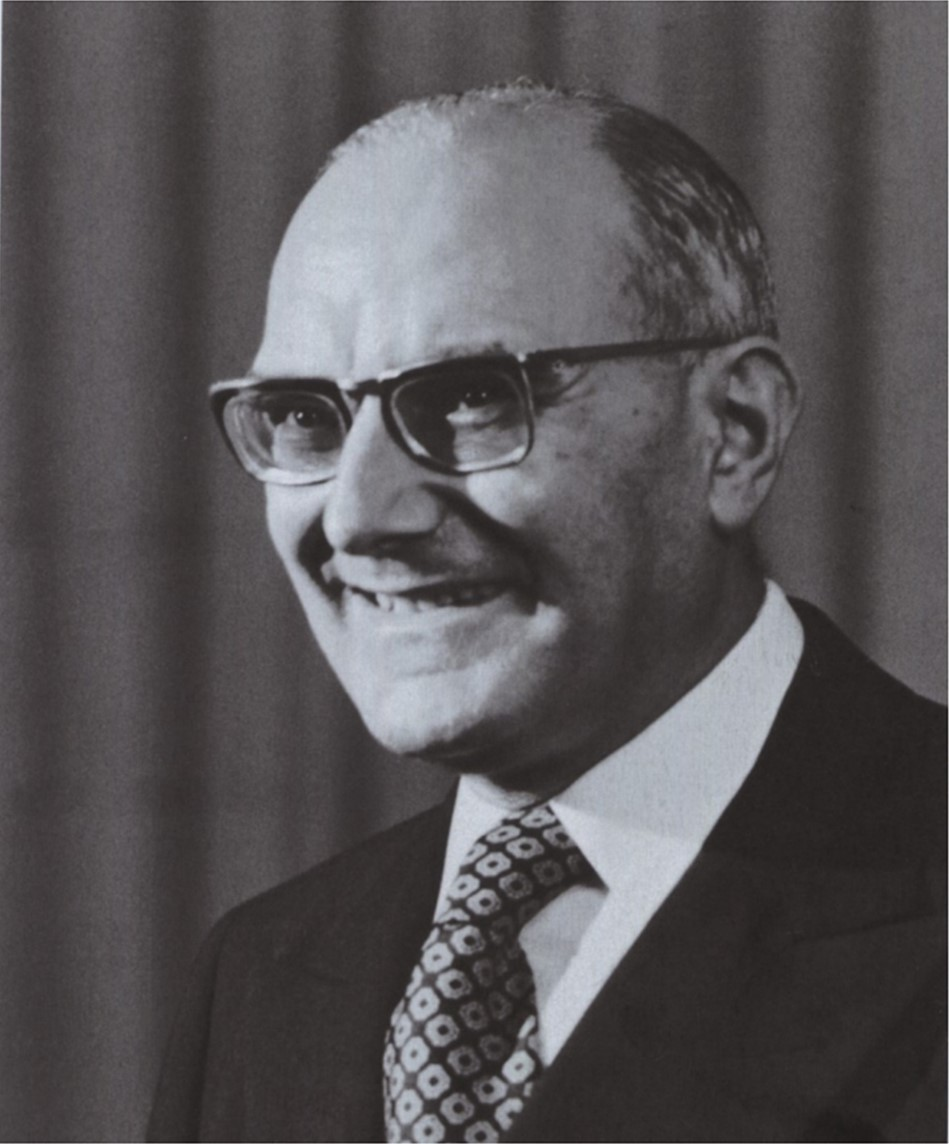
Prime Minister Marcelo Caetano.

The liberalization of the Portuguese economy continued under Salazar's successor, Prime Minister Marcello José das Neves Caetano (1968–74), whose administration abolished industrial licensing requirements for firms in most sectors and in 1972 signed a free trade agreement with the newly enlarged EC. Under the agreement, which took effect at the beginning of 1973, Portugal was given until 1980 to abolish its restrictions on most community goods and until 1985 on certain sensitive products amounting to some 10 percent of the EC's total exports to Portugal. EFTA membership and a growing foreign investor presence contributed to Portugal's industrial modernization and export diversification between 1960 and 1973.

Notwithstanding the concentration of the means of production in the hands of a small number of family-based financial-industrial groups, Portuguese business culture permitted a surprising upward mobility of university-educated individuals with middle-class backgrounds into professional management careers. Before the revolution, the largest, most technologically advanced (and most recently organized) firms offered the greatest opportunity for management careers based on merit rather than birth.

By the early 1970s, Portugal's fast economic growth with increasing consumption and purchase of new automobiles set the priority for improvements in transportation. Brisa – Autoestradas de Portugal was founded in 1972, and the State granted the company a 30-year concession to design, build, manage, and maintain express motorways.

===== The counterinsurgency war effort =====
From 1961 to 1974, Portugal faced independence insurgencies in its African overseas territories – the Portuguese Colonial War. The Portuguese national interests in Africa were put under threat by several separatist guerrilla organizations supported by most of the international community and the United Nations. By the early 1970s, while the counterinsurgency war was won in Angola, it was less than satisfactorily contained in Mozambique and dangerously stalemated in Portuguese Guinea from the Portuguese point of view, so the Portuguese Government decided to create sustainability policies in order to allow continuous sources of financing for the war effort in the long run. On 13 November 1972, a sovereign wealth fund (Fundo do Ultramar – The Overseas Fund) was enacted through the Decree Law Decreto-Lei n.º 448/ /72 and the Ministry of Defense ordinance Portaria 696/72, in order to finance the counterinsurgency effort in the Portuguese overseas territories. In addition, new Decree Laws (Decree Law: Decretos-Leis n.os 353, de 13 de Julho de 1973, e 409, de 20 de Agosto) were enforced in order to cut down military expenses and increase the number of officers by incorporating irregular militia as if they were regular military academy officers.

==== Retrospective analysis ====
In 1960, at the initiation of Salazar's more outward-looking economic policy due to the influence of a new generation of technocrats with background in economics and technical-industrial know-how, Portugal's per capita GDP was only 38 percent of the European Community (EC-12) average; by the end of the Salazar period, in 1968, it had risen to 48 percent, and by 1973, under the leadership of Marcelo Caetano, Portugal's per capita GDP had reached 56.4 percent of the EC-12 average. On a long term analysis, after an extended period of economic divergence before 1914, and a period of chaos during the First Republic (1910–1926), the Portuguese economy recovered slightly and unsatisfactorily until 1960 due to economically illiberal corporativist and protectionist policies promoted by Salazar's regime, entering thereafter on a path of strong economic convergence until the Carnation Revolution in April 1974. Portuguese economic growth in the period 1960–1973 under the Estado Novo regime (and even with the effects of an expensive war effort in African territories against independence guerrilla groups from 1961 onwards) created an opportunity for real integration with the developed economies of Western Europe. Through emigration, trade, tourism, and foreign investment, individuals and firms changed their patterns of production and consumption, bringing about a structural transformation. Simultaneously, the increasing complexity of a growing economy brought new technical and organizational challenges, stimulating the formation of modern professional and management teams. The economy of Portugal and its overseas territories on the eve of the Carnation Revolution (a military coup on 25 April 1974) was growing well above the European average. Average family purchasing power was rising together with new consumption patterns and trends and this was promoting both investment in new capital equipment and consumption expenditure for durable and nondurable consumer goods. The Estado Novo regime economic policy encouraged and created conditions for the formation of large and successful business conglomerates. Economically, the Estado Novo regime maintained a policy of corporatism that resulted in the placement of a big part of the Portuguese economy in the hands of a number of strong conglomerates, including those founded by the families of António Champalimaud (Banco Totta & Açores, Banco Pinto & Sotto Mayor, Secil, Cimpor), José Manuel de Mello (CUF – Companhia União Fabril), Américo Amorim (Corticeira Amorim) and the dos Santos family (Jerónimo Martins). Those Portuguese conglomerates had a business model with similarities to South Korean chaebols and Japanese keiretsus and zaibatsus. The Companhia União Fabril (CUF) was one of the largest and most diversified Portuguese conglomerates with its core businesses (cement, chemicals, petrochemicals, agrochemicals, textiles, beer, beverages, metallurgy, naval engineering, electrical engineering, insurance, banking, paper, tourism, mining, etc.) and corporate headquarters located in mainland Portugal, but also with branches, plants and several developing business projects all around the Portuguese Empire, specially in the Portuguese territories of Angola and Mozambique. Other medium-sized family companies specialized in textiles (for instance those located in the city of Covilhã and the northwest), ceramics, porcelain, glass and crystal (like those of Alcobaça, Caldas da Rainha and Marinha Grande), engineered wood (like SONAE near Porto), motorcycle manufacturing (like Casal and FAMEL in the District of Aveiro), canned fish (like those of Algarve and the northwest which included one of the oldest canned fish companies in continuous operation in the world), fishing, food and beverages (alcoholic beverages, from liqueurs like Licor Beirão and Ginjinha, to beer like Sagres, were produced across the entire country, but Port Wine was one of its most reputed and exported alcoholic beverages), tourism (well established in Estoril/Cascais/Sintra (the Portuguese Riviera) and growing as an international attraction in the Algarve since the 1960s) and in agriculture and agribusiness (like the ones scattered around Ribatejo and Alentejo – known as the breadbasket of Portugal, as well as the notorious Cachão Agroindustrial Complex established in Mirandela, Northern Portugal, in 1963) completed the panorama of the national economy by the early 1970s and included export-oriented foreign direct investment-funded businesses such as an automotive assembly plant founded in 1962 by Citroën which began operations in 1964 in Mangualde and a Leica factory established in 1973 in Vila Nova de Famalicão. In addition, rural areas' populations were committed to agrarianism that was of great importance for a majority of the total population, with many families living exclusively from agriculture or complementing their salaries with farming, husbandry and forestry yields.

Besides that, the overseas territories were also displaying impressive economic growth and development rates from the 1920s onwards. Even during the Portuguese Colonial War (1961–1974), a counterinsurgency war against independentist guerrilla and terrorism, the overseas territories of Angola and Mozambique (Portuguese Overseas Provinces at the time) had continuous economic growth rates and several sectors of its local economies were booming. They were internationally notable centres of production of oil, coffee, cotton, cashew, coconut, timber, minerals (like diamonds), metals (like iron and aluminium), banana, citrus, tea, sisal, beer (Cuca and Laurentina were successful beer brands produced locally), cement, fish and other sea products, beef and textiles. Tourism was also a fast-developing activity in Portuguese Africa both by the growing development of and demand for beach resorts and wildlife reserves.

Labour unions were not allowed and a minimum wage policy was not enforced. However, in a context of an expanding economy, bringing better living conditions for the Portuguese population in the 1960s, the outbreak of the colonial wars in Portuguese Africa set off significant social changes, among them the rapid incorporation of more and more women into the labour market. Marcelo Caetano moved on to foster economic growth and some social improvements, such as the awarding of a monthly pension to rural workers who had never had the chance to pay social security. The objectives of Caetano's pension reform were threefold: enhancing equity, reducing fiscal and actuarial imbalance, and achieving more efficiency for the economy as a whole, for example, by establishing contributions less distortive to labour markets or by allowing the savings generated by pension funds to increase the investments in the economy. In 1969, after the replacement of António de Oliveira Salazar by Marcelo Caetano, the Estado Novo-controlled nation got indeed a very slight taste of democracy and Caetano allowed the formation of the first democratic labour union movement since the 1920s.

Caetano's Portuguese Government began also a military reform that gave the opportunity to militia officers who completed a brief training program and had served in the overseas territories' defensive campaigns, of being commissioned at the same rank as military academy graduates in order to increase the number of officials employed against the African insurgencies, and at the same time cut down military costs to alleviate an already overburdened government budget. Thus, a group of disgusted captains started to instigate their peers to conspire against the new laws proposed by the regime. The protest of Portuguese Armed Forces captains against a decree law: the Dec. Lei nº 353/73 of 1973. would therefore lie behind a military coup on 25 April 1974 – the Carnation Revolution.

=== Revolutionary change, 1974 ===
The anti-Estado Novo MFA-led Carnation Revolution, a military coup in Lisbon on 25 April 1974, initially had a negative impact on the Portuguese economy and social structure. Although the military-led coup returned democracy to Portugal, ending the unpopular Colonial War where thousands of Portuguese soldiers had been conscripted into military service, and replacing the authoritarian Estado Novo (New State) regime and its secret police which repressed elemental civil liberties and political freedoms, it also paved the way for the end of Portugal as an intercontinental empire and an intermediate emerging power. The coup was originally a mostly pro-democracy movement, intended to replace the previous regime with a Western-style liberal democracy and to develop and modernize the economy in order to achieve Western European standards of living, along with finding a solution for the African colonies to end the 13-year-long Colonial War. However, by late 1974 to early 1975, moderate factions (led by personalities such as António de Spínola and Mário Soares) lost power to Marxist-oriented and far-left ones (led by personalities such as Otelo Saraiva de Carvalho and Álvaro Cunhal). Communists gained increasing influence in the provisional cabinets led by Vasco Gonçalves and after a failed coup carried by Spínola on 11 March 1975, the government launched the Processo Revolucionário em Curso (Ongoing Revolutionary Process) marked by nationalizations of hundreds of private companies (including virtually all mass media), politically-based firings (saneamentos políticos) and land expropriations. Power in the African colonies was handover to selected former independentist guerrilla movements, which acted as the spark for the appearance of civil wars or the introduction of single party regimes in the newly independent states. This decolonization also prompted a mass exodus of Portuguese citizens from Portugal's African territories (mostly from the then overseas territories of Angola and Mozambique), creating over a million Portuguese destitute refugees – the retornados. Along with the arrival of the retornados, PREC was also marked by political violence and social chaos, exodus of industrialists, a brain drain of technical and managerial experts and sanctioned occupations of agricultural estates, factories and houses. Moderates eventually reconquered influence in the government after mid-1975: Prime Minister Vasco Gonçalves was sacked in September (replaced by moderate Pinheiro de Azevedo) and the radical factions eventually lost most of their influence after carrying a failed coup on 25 November 1975. The 1976 parliamentary and presidential elections allowed Mário Soares to become Prime Minister and General Ramalho Eanes (who played an essential role in defeating the 25 November 1975 coup attempt) to become President of Portugal.

The Portuguese economy had changed significantly prior to the 1974 revolution, in comparison with its position in 1961—total output (GDP at factor cost) had grown by 120 percent in real terms. The pre-revolutionary period was characterized by robust annual growth rates for GDP (6.9 percent), industrial production (9 percent), private consumption (6.5 percent), and gross fixed capital formation (7.8 percent).

The post revolution period was, however, characterized by chaos and negative economic growth, as industries became nationalized and the effects of the decoupling of Portugal from its former overseas territories, especially Angola and Mozambique, were felt.

Additionally, the general European economic growth, including the Portuguese one, came to an end after the oil price shock of 1973. That shock consisted in a significant increase of energy prices as a result of occurring conflicts in the Middle East. The result was stagflation, a combination of economic growth stagnation and inflation. Heavy industry came to an abrupt halt. All sectors of the economy, including manufacturing, mining, chemical, defence, finance, agriculture, and fishing, collapsed. Portugal quickly went from the country with the highest growth rate in Western Europe to the lowest, and experienced several years of negative growth. This was amplified by the mass emigration of skilled workers and entrepreneurs (among them were António Champalimaud and José Manuel de Mello) due to communism-inspired political intimidation in the context of the political turmoil that marked the country from mid-1974 to late 1975, along with economic stagnation.

Only in 1991, 16 years later, did the GDP as a percentage of EC-12 average climb to 54.9 percent (nearly comparable with that which had existed by the time of the Carnation Revolution in 1974), mainly as a result of participation in the European Economic Community since 1985. Post revolution Portugal was not able to achieve the same economic growth rates as it achieved during the last decade before 1975.

==== Nationalization ====
The reorganization of the MFA coordinating committee in March 1975 brought into prominence a group of Marxist-oriented officers. In league with the General Confederation of Portuguese Workers-National Intersindical (Confederação Geral dos Trabalhadores Portugueses–Intersindical Nacional (CGTP–IN), the communist-dominated trade union confederation known as Intersindical prior to 1977, they sought a radical transformation of the nation's social system and political economy. This change of direction from a purely pro-democracy coup to a communist-oriented one became known as the Processo Revolucionário Em Curso (PREC). Abandoning its moderate-reformist posture, the MFA leadership set out on a course of sweeping nationalizations and land expropriations. Wide powers were handed over to the working class always having the concept of dictatorship of the proletariat in mind. The lasting effects of this hampered Portugal's economic growth and development for years to come. During the balance of that year, the government nationalized all Portuguese-owned capital in the banking, insurance, petrochemical, fertilizer, tobacco, cement, and wood pulp sectors of the economy, as well as the Portuguese iron and steel company, major breweries, large shipping lines, most public transport, two of the three principal shipyards, core companies of the Companhia União Fabril (CUF) conglomerate, radio and TV networks (except that of the Roman Catholic Church), and important companies in the glass, mining, fishing, and agricultural sectors. Because of the key role of the domestic banks as holders of stock, the government indirectly acquired equity positions in hundreds of other firms. An Institute for State Participation was created to deal with the many disparate and often tiny enterprises in which the state had thus obtained a majority shareholding. Another 300 small to medium enterprises came under public management as the government "intervened" to rescue them from bankruptcy following their takeover by workers or abandonment by management.

Although foreign direct investment was statutorily exempted from nationalization, many foreign-controlled enterprises curtailed or ceased operation because of costly forced labor settlements or worker takeovers. The combination of revolutionary policies and a negative business climate brought about a sharp reversal in the trend of direct investment inflows from abroad.

After the coup, both the Lisbon and Porto stock exchanges were closed by the revolutionary National Salvation Junta; they would be reopened a couple of years later.

A study by the economists Maria Belmira Martins and José Chaves Rosa showed that a total of 244 private enterprises were directly nationalized during the 16 months from 14 March 1975, to 29 July 1976. Nationalization was followed by the consolidation of the several private firms in each industry into state monopolies. As an example, Quimigal, the chemical and fertilizer entity, represented a merger of five firms. Four large companies were integrated to form the national oil company, Petróleos de Portugal (Petrogal). Portucel brought together five pulp and paper companies. The fourteen private electric power enterprises were joined into a single power generation and transmission monopoly, Electricidade de Portugal (EDP). With the nationalization and amalgamation of the three tobacco firms under Tabaqueira, the state gained complete control of this industry. The several breweries and beer distribution companies were integrated into two state firms, Central de Cervejas (Centralcer) and Unicer; and a single state enterprise, Rodoviária, was created by merging the 93 nationalized trucking and bus lines. The 47 cement plants, formerly controlled by the Champalimaud interests, were integrated into Cimentos de Portugal (Cimpor). The government also acquired a dominant position in the export-oriented shipbuilding and ship repair industry. Former private monopolies retained their company designations following nationalization. Included among these were the iron and steel company Siderurgia Nacional, the railway Caminhos de Ferro Portugueses (CP), and the national airline, Transportes Aéreos Portugueses (TAP).

Unlike other sectors, where existing private firms were typically consolidated into state monopolies, the commercial banking system and insurance industry were left with a degree of competition. By 1979, the number of domestic commercial banks was reduced from 15 to 9. Notwithstanding their public status, the remaining banks competed with each other and retained their individual identities and policies.

Before the revolution, private enterprise ownership dominated the Portuguese economy to a degree unmatched in other western European countries. Only a handful of wholly owned or majority owned state entities existed; these included the post office (CTT), two of three telecommunications companies (CTT and TLP), the armaments industry, and the ports, as well as the National Development Bank and Caixa Geral de Depósitos, the largest savings bank. The Portuguese government held minority interests in TAP, the national airline, in Siderurgia Nacional, the third telecommunications company Radio Marconi, and in oil refining and oil marketing firms. The railroads, two colonial banks (Banco de Angola and BNU), and the Bank of Portugal were majority privately owned but publicly administered. Finally, although privately owned, the tobacco companies were operated under government concessions.

Two years after the military coup, the enlarged public sector accounted for 47 percent of the country's gross fixed capital formation (GFCF), 30 percent of total value added (VA), and 24 percent of employment. These compared with 10 percent of GFCF, 9 percent of VA, and 13 percent of employment for the traditional public sector of 1973. Expansion of the public sector since the revolution was particularly apparent in heavy manufacturing, in public services including electricity, gas, transport, and communications, and in banking and insurance. Further, according to the Institute for State Participation, these figures did not include private enterprises under temporary state intervention, with minority state participation (less than 50 percent of the common stock), or worker-managed firms and agricultural collectives.

==== Land reform ====
In the agricultural sector, the collective farms set up in Alentejo after the 1974–75 expropriations due to the coup proved incapable of modernizing, and their efficiency declined. According to government estimates, about 900,000 hectares (2,200,000 acres) of agricultural land were occupied between April 1974 and December 1975 in the name of land reform (reforma agrária); around 32% of these were ruled illegal. In January 1976, the government pledged to restore the illegally occupied lands to their owners, and in 1977, it promulgated the Land Reform Review Law. Restoration began in 1978.

==== The brain drain ====
Compounding the problem of massive nationalizations was the brain drain of managerial and technical expertise away from public enterprises. The income-leveling measures of the MFA revolutionary regime, together with the "anti-fascist" purges in factories, offices, and large agricultural estates, induced an exodus of human capital, mainly to Brazil. This loss of managers, technicians, and businesspeople inspired a popular Lisbon saying: "Portugal used to send its legs to Brazil, but now we are sending our heads."

A detailed analysis of Portugal's loss of managerial resources is contained in Harry M. Makler's follow-up surveys of 306 enterprises, conducted in July 1976, and again in June 1977. His study makes clear that nationalization was greater in the modern, large, and technically advanced industries than in the traditional ones such as textiles, apparel, and construction. In small enterprises (50–99 employees), only 15 percent of the industrialists left as compared with 43 percent in the larger organizations. In the largest firms (1,000 or more employees), more than half left. Makler's calculations show that the higher the socioeconomic class of the person, the greater the likelihood that they had left the firm. He also notes that "the more upwardly mobile also were more likely to have quit than those who were downwardly socially mobile." Significantly, a much larger percentage of professional managers (52 percent) compared with owners of production such as founders (18%), heirs (21%), and owner-managers (32%) had left their enterprises.

The constitution of 1976 confirmed the large and interventionist role of the state in the economy. Its Marxist character, which lasted until the 1982 and 1989 revisions, was revealed in a number of its articles, which pointed to a "classless society" and the "socialization of the means of production" and proclaimed all nationalizations made after 25 April 1974, as "irreversible conquests of the working classes". The constitution also defined new power relationships between labor and management, with a strong bias in favor of labor. All regulations with reference to layoffs, including collective redundancy, were circumscribed by Article 53.

==== Role of the new public sector ====
After the revolution, the Portuguese economy experienced a rapid, and sometimes uncontrollable, expansion of public expenditures—both in the general government and in public enterprises. The lag in public sector receipts resulted in large public enterprise and government deficits. In 1982, the borrowing requirement of the consolidated public sector reached 24 percent of GDP, its peak level; it was reduced to 9 percent of GDP by 1990.

To rein in domestic demand growth, the Portuguese government was obliged to pursue International Monetary Fund (IMF)-monitored stabilization programs in 1977–78 and 1983–85. The large negative savings of the public sector (including the state-owned enterprises) became a structural feature of Portugal's political economy after the revolution. Other official impediments to rapid economic growth after 1974 included all-pervasive price regulation, as well as heavy-handed intervention in factor markets and the distribution of income.

In 1989, Prime Minister Aníbal Cavaco Silva succeeded in mobilizing the required two-thirds vote in the National Assembly to amend the constitution, thereby permitting the denationalization of the state-owned banks and other public enterprises. Privatization, economic deregulation, and tax reform became the salient concerns of public policy as Portugal prepared itself for the challenges and opportunities of membership in the EC's single market in the 1990s.

==== The non-financial public enterprises ====
Following the sweeping nationalizations of the mid-1970s, public enterprises became a major component of Portugal's consolidated public sector. Portugal's nationalized sector in 1980 included a core of fifty non-financial enterprises, which were entirely government owned. This so-called public non-financial enterprise group included the Institute of State Participation, a holding company with investments in some seventy subsidiary enterprises; a number of state-owned entities manufacturing or selling goods and services grouped with nationalized enterprises for national accounts purposes (arms, agriculture, and public infrastructure such as ports); and a large number of over 50 percent EPNF-owned subsidiaries operating under private law. Altogether, these public enterprises accounted for 25 percent of VA in GDP, 52 percent of GFCF, and 12 percent of Portugal's total employment. In terms of VA and GFCF, the relative scale of Portugal's public entities exceeded that of the other western European economies, including the EC member countries.

Although the nationalizations broke up the concentration of economic power that had been held by financial-industrial groups, the subsequent merger of several private firms into single publicly owned enterprises left domestic markets even more monopolized. Apart from special cases, as in iron and steel, where the economies of scale are optimal for very large firms, there was some question as to the desirability of establishing national monopolies. The elimination of competition following the official takeover of industries such as cement, chemicals, and trucking probably reduced managerial incentives for cost reduction and technical advance.

It was not surprising that numerous nationalized enterprises experienced severe operating and financial difficulties. State operations faced considerable uncertainty as to the goals of public enterprises, with negative implications for decision making, often at odds with market criteria. In many instances, managers of public firms were less able than their private-sector counterparts to resist strong wage demands from militant unions. Further, public firm managers were required for political expediency to maintain a redundant labor force and freeze prices or utility rates for long periods in the face of rising costs. Overstaffing was particularly flagrant at Petrogal, the national petroleum monopoly, and Estaleiros Navais de Setúbal (Setenave), the wholly state-owned shipbuilding and repairing enterprise. The failure of the public transportation firms to raise fares during a time of accelerating inflation resulted in substantial operating losses and obsolescence of the sector's capital stock.

As a group, the public enterprises performed poorly financially and relied excessively on debt financing from both domestic and foreign commercial banks. The operating and financial problems of the public enterprise sector were revealed in a study by the Bank of Portugal covering the years 1978–80. Based upon a survey of fifty-one enterprises, which represented 92 percent of the sector's VA, the analysis confirmed the debilitated financial condition of the public enterprises, as evidenced by their inadequate equity and liquidity ratios. The consolidated losses of the firms included in the survey increased from 18.3 million contos (equivalent to €1.291152×10^{9} in 2007) to 40.3 million contos (equivalent to €1.964501×10^{9} in 2007) from 1978 to 1980, or 4.6 percent to 6.1 percent of net worth, respectively. Losses were concentrated in transportation and to a lesser extent transport equipment and materials (principally shipbuilding and ship repair). The budgetary burden of the public enterprises was substantial: enterprise transfers to the Portuguese government (mainly taxes) fell short of government receipts in the forms of subsidies and capital transfers. The largest nonfinancial state enterprises recorded (inflation-discounted) losses in the seven-year period from 1977 to 1983 equivalent to 11 percent on capital employed. Notwithstanding their substantial operating losses and weak capital structure, these large enterprises financed 86 percent of their capital investments from 1977 to 1983 through increased debt, of which two-thirds was foreign. The rapid buildup of Portugal's external debt from 1978 to 1985 was largely associated with the public enterprises.

==== General government ====
The share of general government expenditure (including capital outlays) in GDP rose from 23 percent in 1973 to 46 percent in 1990. On the revenue side, the upward trend was less pronounced: the share increased from nearly 23 percent in 1973 to 39.2 percent in 1990. From a modest surplus before the revolution in 1973, the government balance swung to a wide deficit of 12 percent of GDP in 1984, declining thereafter to around 5.4 percent of GDP in 1990. Significantly, both current expenditures and capital expenditures roughly doubled their shares of GDP between 1973 and 1990: government current outlays rose from 19.5 percent to 40.2 percent, capital outlays from 3.2 percent to 5.7 percent.

Apart from the growing investment effort, which included capital transfers to the public enterprises, government expenditure patterns since the revolution reflected rapid expansion in the number of civil servants and pressure to redistribute income, mainly through current transfers and subsidies, as well as burgeoning interest obligations. The category "current transfers" nearly tripled its share of GDP between 1973 and 1990, from under 5 percent to 13.4 percent, reflecting the explosive growth of the social security system, both with respect to the number of persons covered and the upgrading of benefits. Escalating interest payments on the public debt, from less than half a percent of GDP in 1973 to 8.2 percent of GDP in 1990, were the result of both a rise in the debt itself and higher real effective interest rates.

The narrowing of the government deficit since the mid-1980s and the associated easing of the borrowing requirement was caused both by a small increase in the share of receipts (by two percentage points) and the relatively sharper contraction of current subsidies, from 7.6 percent of GDP in 1984 to 1.5 percent of GDP in 1990. This reduction was a direct consequence of the gradual abandonment by the government of its policy of curbs on rises in public utility rates and food prices, against which it paid subsidies to public enterprises.

Tax reform—comprising both direct and indirect taxation—was a major element in a more comprehensive effort to modernize the economy in the late 1980s. The key objective of these reforms was to promote more efficient and market-oriented economic performance.

Prior to the reform, about 90 percent of the personal tax base consisted of labor income. Statutory marginal tax rates on labor income were very high, even at relatively low income levels, especially after the revolution. The large number of tax exemptions and fiscal benefits, together with high marginal tax rates, entailed the progressive erosion of the tax base through tax avoidance. Furthermore, Portuguese membership in the EC created the imperative for a number of changes in the tax system, especially the introduction of the value-added tax.

Reform proceeded in two major installments: the VAT was introduced in 1986; the income tax reform, for both personal and corporate income, became effective in 1989. The VAT, whose normal rate was 17%, replaced all indirect taxes, such as the transactions tax, railroad tax, and tourism tax. Marginal tax rates on both personal and corporate income were substantially cut, and in the case of individual taxes, the number of brackets was reduced to five. The basic rate of corporate tax was 36.5%, and the top marginal tax rate on personal income was cut from 80% to 40%. A 25% capital gains tax was levied on direct and portfolio investment. Business proceeds invested in development projects were exempt from capital gains tax if the assets were retained for at least two years.

Preliminary estimates indicated that part of the observed increase in direct tax revenue in 1989–90 was of a permanent nature, the consequence of a redefinition of taxable income, a reduction in allowed deductions, and the termination of most fiscal benefits for corporations. The resulting broadening of the income tax base permitted a lowering of marginal tax rates, greatly reducing the disincentive effects to labor and saving.

==== Macroeconomic disequilibria and public debt ====
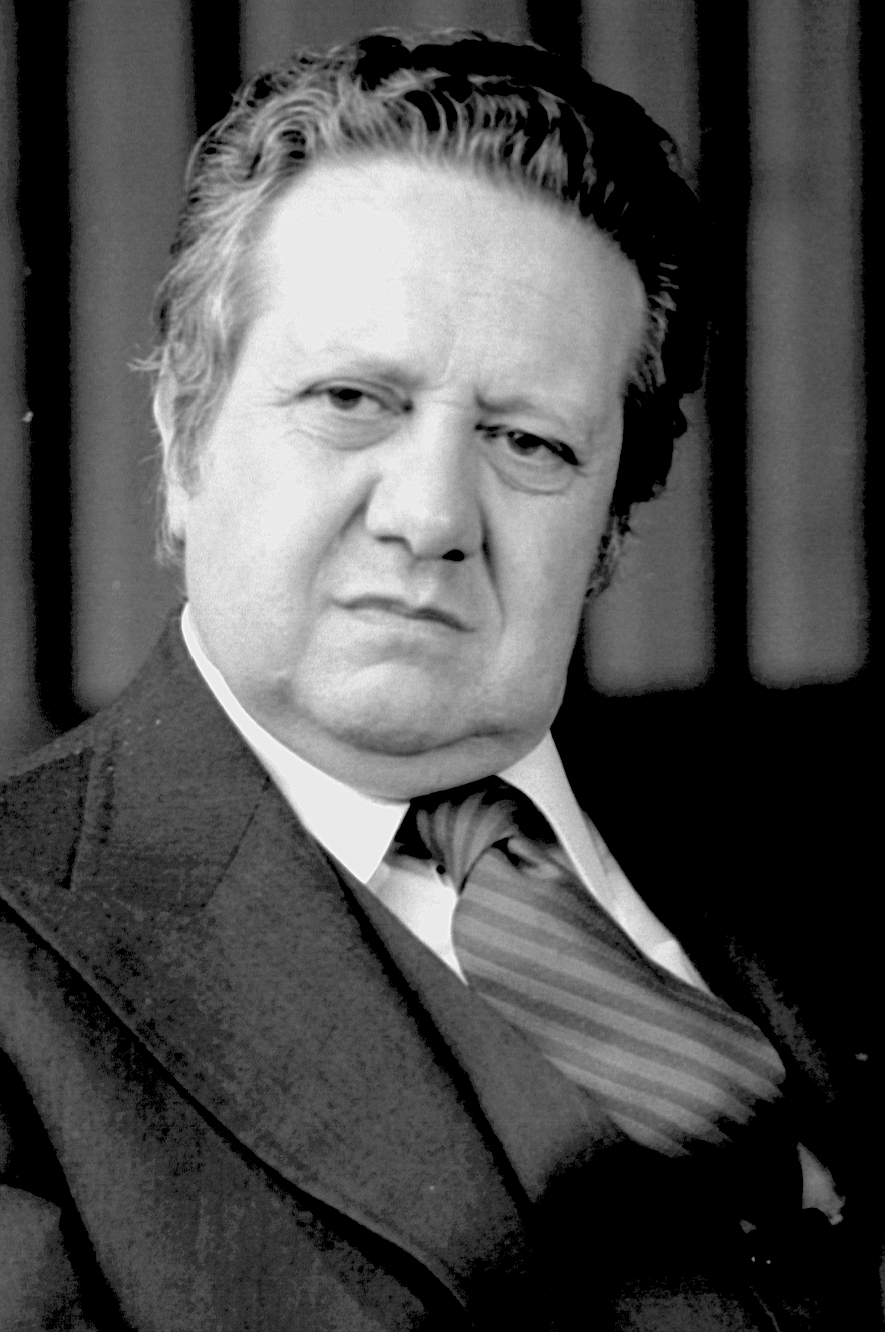
Mário Soares of the Socialist Party (PS), served as Prime Minister of Portugal from 1976 to 1978 and from 1983 to 1985. Portugal's economic situation obliged the government to pursue International Monetary Fund (IMF)-monitored stabilization programs in 1977–78 and 1983–85.

Between 1973 and 1988, the general government debt/GDP ratio quadrupled, reaching a peak of 74 percent in 1988. This growth in the absolute and relative debt was only partially attributable to the accumulation of government deficits. It also reflected the reorganization of various public funds and enterprises, the separation of their accounts from those of the government, and their fiscal consolidation. The rising trend of the general government debt/GDP ratio was reversed in 1989, as a surge in tax revenues linked to the tax reform and the shrinking public enterprise deficits reduced the public sector borrowing requirement (PSBR) relative to GDP. After falling to 67% in 1990, the general government debt/GDP ratio was expected to continue to decline, reflecting fiscal restraint and increased proceeds from privatization.

The financing structure of the public deficits had changed since the mid-1980s due to two factors. First, the easing of the PSBR and the government's determination to reduce the foreign debt/GDP ratio led to a sharp reduction in borrowing abroad. Second, since 1985 the share of nonmonetary financing had increased steeply, not only in the form of public issues of Treasury bills but also, since 1987–88, in the form of medium-term Treasury bonds.

The magnitude of the public sector deficit (including that of the public enterprises) had a crowding-out effect on private investment. The nationalized banks were obliged by law to increase their holding of government paper bearing negative real interest rates. This massive absorption of funds by the public sector was largely at the expense of private enterprises whose financing was often constrained by quantitative credit controls.

Portugal's membership in the EC resulted in substantial net transfers averaging 1.5 percent of annual GDP during 1987–90. The bulk of these transfers were "structural" funds that were used for infrastructure developments and professional training. Additional EC funds, also allocated through the public sector, were designed for the development of Portugal's agricultural and industrial sectors.

After 1985, the PSBR began to show a substantial decline, largely as a result of the improved financial position of public enterprises. Favorable exogenous factors (lower oil prices, lower interest rates, and depreciation of the dollar) helped to moderate operating costs. More important, however, was the shift in government policy. Public enterprise managers were given greater autonomy in investment, labor, and product pricing. Significantly, the combined deficit of the nonfinancial public enterprises fell to below 2 percent of GDP on average in 1987–88 from 8 percent of GDP in 1985–86. In 1989 the borrowing requirements of those enterprises fell further to 1 percent of GDP.

In April 1990, legislation concerning privatization was enacted following an amendment to the constitution in June 1989 that provided the basis for complete (100 percent) divestiture of nationalized enterprises. Among the stated objectives of privatization were to modernize economic units, increase their competitiveness, and contribute to sectoral restructuring; to reduce the role of the state in the economy; to contribute to the development of capital markets; and to widen the participation of Portuguese citizens in the ownership of enterprises, giving particular attention to the workers of the enterprises and to small shareholders.

The government was concerned about the strength of foreign investment in privatizations and wanted to reserve the right to veto some transactions. But, as a member of the EC, Portugal would eventually have to accept investment from other member countries on parity with investment of its nationals. Significantly, government proceeds from privatization of nationalized enterprises would primarily be used to reduce public debt, and to the extent that profits would rise after privatization, tax revenues would expand. In 1991, proceeds from privatization were expected to amount to 2.5 percent of GDP.

==== Changing structure of the economy ====
The Portuguese economy had changed significantly by 1973, compared with its position in 1961. Total output (GDP at factor cost) grew by 120 percent in real terms. The industrial sector was three times greater, and the services sector doubled; however, agriculture, forestry, and fishing advanced by only 16 percent. Manufacturing, the major component of the secondary sector, tripled during this time. Industrial expansion was concentrated in large-scale enterprises using modern technology.

The composition of GDP also changed markedly from 1961 to 1973. The share of the primary sector (agriculture, forestry, and fishing) in GDP shrank from 23 to 16.8 percent, and the contribution of the secondary (or industrial) sector (manufacturing, construction, mining, electricity, gas, and water) increased from 37 to 44 percent. The services sector's share in GDP remained constant at 39.4 percent. Within the industrial sector, the contribution of manufacturing advanced from 30 to 35 percent and that of construction from 4.6 to 6.4 percent.

The progressive "opening" of Portugal to the world economy was reflected in the growing shares of exports and imports (both visible and invisible) in national output and income. Further, the composition of Portugal's balance of international payments altered substantially. From 1960 to 1973, the merchandise trade deficit widened, but owing to a growing surplus on invisibles—including tourist receipts and emigrant worker remittances—the deficit in the current account gave way to a surplus from 1965 onwards. Beginning with that year, the long-term capital account typically registered a deficit, the counterpart of the current account surplus. Even though the nation attracted a rising level of capital from abroad (both direct investments and loans), official and private Portuguese investments in the "overseas territories" were greater still, causing the net outflow on the long-term capital account.

The growth rate of Portuguese merchandise exports during the period 1959 to 1973 was 11 percent per annum. In 1960 the bulk of exports was accounted for by a few products such as canned fish, raw and manufactured cork, cotton textiles, and wine. By contrast, in the early 1970s, Portugal's export list underwent diversification, including both consumer and capital goods. Several branches of Portuguese industry became export-oriented, and in 1973 over one-fifth of Portuguese manufactured output was exported.

The radical nationalization-expropriation measures in the mid-1970s were initially accompanied by a policy-induced redistribution of national income from property owners, entrepreneurs, and private managers and professionals to industrial and agricultural workers. This wage explosion favoring workers with a high propensity to consume had a dramatic impact on the nation's economic growth and pattern of expenditures. Private and public consumption combined rose from 81 percent of domestic expenditure in 1973 to nearly 102 percent in 1975. The counterpart of overconsumption in the face of declining national output was a contraction in both savings and fixed capital formation, depletion of stocks, and a huge balance-of-payments deficit. The rapid increase in production costs associated with the surge in unit labor costs between 1973 and 1975 contributed significantly to the decline in Portugal's ability to compete in foreign markets. Real exports fell between 1973 and 1976, and their share in total expenditures declined from nearly 26 percent to 16.5 percent.

The economic dislocations of metropolitan Portugal associated with the income leveling and nationalization-expropriation measures were exacerbated by the sudden loss of the nation's African colonies in 1974 and 1975 and the reabsorption of overseas settlers, the global recession, and the international energy crisis.

Over the longer period, 1973–90, the composition of Portugal's GDP at factor cost changed significantly. The contribution of agriculture, forestry, and fishing as a share of total production continued its inexorable decline, to 6.1 percent from 12.2 percent in 1973. In contrast to the pre-revolutionary period, 1961–73, when the industrial sector grew by 9 percent annually and its contribution to GDP expanded, industry's share narrowed from 44 to 38.4 percent of GDP. Manufacturing, the major component of the industrial sector, contributed relatively less to GDP in 1990, falling from 35 to 28 percent. Most striking was the 16 percentage point increase in the participation of the services sector from 39 percent to 55.5 percent. Most of this growth reflected the proliferation of civil service employment and the associated cost of public administration, together with the dynamic contribution of tourism services during the 1980s.

==== Economic growth, 1960–1973 and 1985–1992 ====
There was a striking contrast between the economic growth and levels of capital formation in the 1960–1973 period and in the 1980s. The pre-revolutionary period was characterized by robust annual growth rates for GDP (6.9 percent), industrial production (9 percent), private consumption (6.5 percent), and gross fixed capital formation (7.8 percent), although income distribution was extremely unequal and the Portuguese state spent a lot of its resources on the colonial war effort. By way of contrast, the 1980s exhibited slower annual growth rates for GDP (2.7 percent), industrial production (4.8 percent), private consumption (2.7 percent), and fixed capital formation (3.1 percent). As a result of worker emigration and the military draft, employment declined during the earlier period, but increased by 1.4 percent annually during the 1980s. Significantly, labor productivity (GDP growth/employment growth) grew by a sluggish rate of 1.3 percent annually in the more recent period compared with the extremely rapid annual growth rate of 7.4 percent earlier. Inflation, as measured by the GDP deflator, averaged a modest 4 percent a year before the revolution compared with nearly 18 percent annually during the 1980s. In 1960, Portugal joined the European Free Trade Association (EFTA) as a founding member.

Although the investment coefficients were roughly similar (24 percent of GDP allocated to fixed capital formation in the earlier period compared to 26.7 percent during the 1980s), the overall investment productivity or efficiency (GDP growth rate/investment coefficient) was nearly three times greater before the revolution (28.6 percent) than in the 1980s (10.1 percent).

In 1960, after nearly three decades of forced political and economic rule under Salazar's dictatorship, Portugal's per capita GDP was only 38 percent of the EC-12 average. This stagnation and the emerging war in the colonies were reasons for a change in policy to an outward-looking economic policy. By the end of the Salazar period, in 1968, GDP had risen to 48 percent, and in 1973, on the eve of the revolution, Portugal's per capita GDP had reached 56.4 percent of the EC-12 average. In 1975, when revolutionary turmoil peaked, Portugal's per capita GDP declined to 52.3 percent of the EC-12 average. Convergence of real GDP growth toward the EC average occurred as a result of Portugal's economic resurgence since 1985. In 1991 Portugal's GDP per capita climbed to 54.9 percent of the EC average, exceeding by a fraction the level attained during the height of the revolutionary period. In addition, the events of 1974 prompted a mass exodus of citizens from Portugal's African territories (mostly from Portuguese Angola and Mozambique), creating over a million Portuguese destitute refugees known as the retornados. Portugal entered the European Economic Community (EEC) in 1986 and left the European Free Trade Association (EFTA), which it had helped found in 1960. An important external influx of structural and cohesion funds was managed by the country as the EEC evolved to the European Union (EU) and beyond.

=== European Union integration: the 1990s and 2000s ===
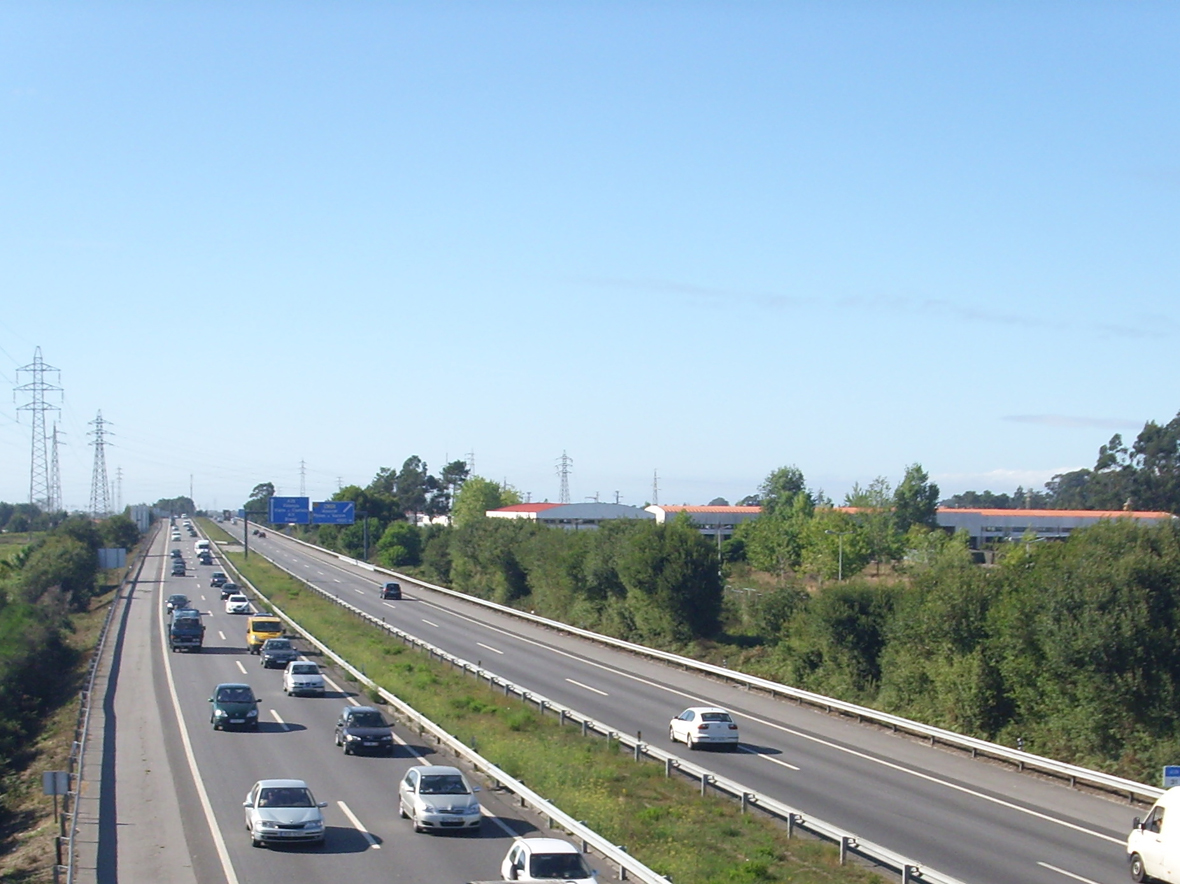
In the 1990s many motorways were opened. Shown is the A28 motorway in the Grande Porto subregion.

Portugal experienced a strong recovery in a few decades after the leftist turmoil of 1974, the ultimate loss of its overseas empire in 1975, and the adhesion to the European Economic Community in 1986.

Although the occurrence of economic growth and a public debt relatively well-contained as a result of the number of civil servants has been increased from 485,368 in 1988 to 509,732 in 1991, which was a much lower increase than that which will happen in the following years until 2011 marked by irrational and unsustainable State employment, from 1988 to 1993, during the government cabinets led by then Prime Minister Aníbal Cavaco Silva, the Portuguese economy was radically changed. As a result, there was a sharp and rapid decrease in the output of tradable goods and a rise of the importance of the non-tradable goods sector in the Portuguese economy.

The European Union's structural and cohesion funds, and the growth of many of Portugal's main exporting companies, which became leading world players in a number of economic sectors, such as engineered wood, injection molding, plastics, specialized software, ceramics, textiles, footwear, paper, cork, and fine wine, among others, was a major factor in the development of the Portuguese economy and improvements in the standard of living and quality of life. Similarly, for several years, the Portuguese subsidiaries of large multinational companies, such as Siemens Portugal, Volkswagen Autoeuropa, Qimonda Portugal, IKEA, Nestlé Portugal, Microsoft Portugal, Unilever/Jerónimo Martins, and Danone Portugal, ranked among the best in the world for productivity.

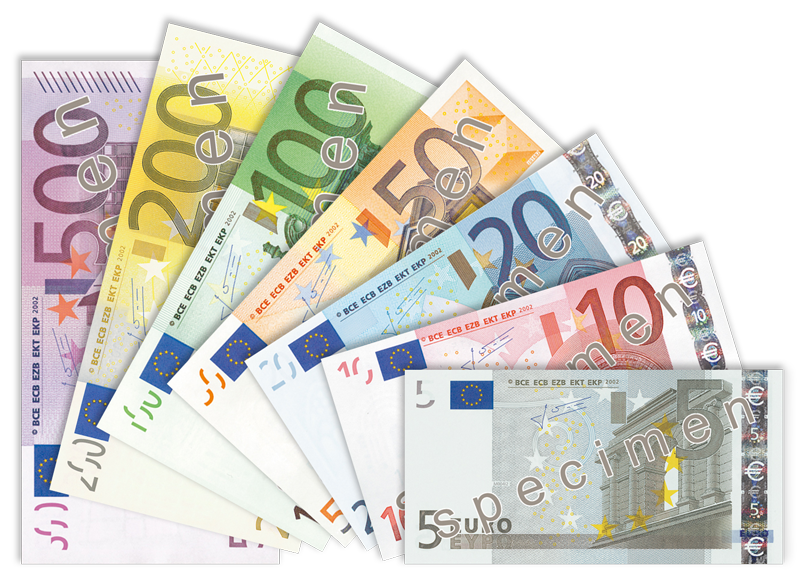
In 2002, Portugal introduced the single European currency, the euro. Together with other EU member states Portugal founded the Eurozone.

Among the most notable Portugal-based global companies that expanded internationally in the 1990s and 2000s were Sonae, Sonae Indústria, Amorim, Sogrape, EFACEC, Portugal Telecom, Jerónimo Martins, Cimpor, Unicer, Millennium bcp, Salvador Caetano, Lactogal, Sumol + Compal, Cerealis, Frulact, Ambar, Bial, Critical Software, Active Space Technologies, YDreams, Galp Energia, Energias de Portugal, Visabeira, Renova, Delta Cafés, Derovo, Teixeira Duarte, Soares da Costa, Portucel Soporcel, Salsa jeans, Grupo José de Mello, Grupo RAR, Valouro, Sovena Group, Simoldes, Iberomoldes, and Logoplaste.

Although being both a developed and a high income country, Portugal had the lowest GDP per capita in western Europe, and the average income was one of the lowest in the European Union. According to the Eurostat it had the sixth-lowest purchasing power of the 27 member states of the European Union for the period 2005–2007. However, research about quality of life by the Economist Intelligence Unit's (EIU) Quality-of-life Survey placed Portugal 19th in the world for 2005, ahead of other economically and technologically advanced countries such as France, Germany, the United Kingdom, and South Korea, but nine places behind its only neighbour, Spain.

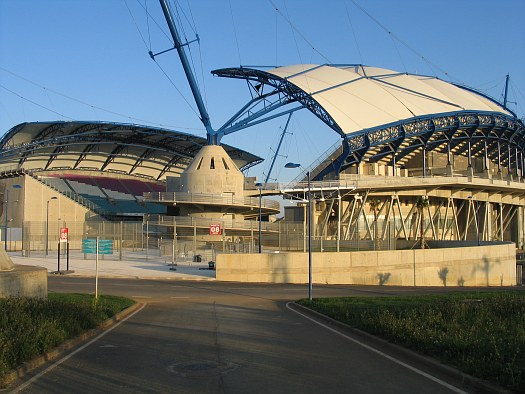
Several new stadiums were built for the UEFA Euro 2004, but a number of these have remained underutilized since then. Shown is the Algarve Stadium.

The Global Competitiveness Report for 2005, published by the World Economic Forum, placed Portugal 22nd, ahead of countries and territories such as Spain, Ireland, France, Belgium, and Hong Kong. On the Technology index, Portugal ranked 20th, on the Public Institutions Index, Portugal ranked 15th best, and on the Macroeconomic Index, Portugal was placed 37th. The Global Competitiveness Index 2007–2008 placed Portugal 40th out of 131 countries and territories. However, the Global Competitiveness Report 2008–2009 edition placed Portugal 43rd out of 134.

Related to the notable economic development that was seen in Portugal from the 1960s to the early 21st century (with an abrupt but short-lived halt after 1974), the development of tourism, which allowed increased exposure for national cultural heritage, particularly in regards to architecture and local cuisine, improved further. The adoption of the euro and the organization of Expo 98 World Fair in Lisbon, the 2001 European Culture Capital in Porto, and the Euro 2004 football championship, were also important landmarks in the economic history of the country.

GDP growth in 2006, at 1.3%, was the lowest in all of Europe. In the first decade of the 21st century, the Czech Republic, Greece, Malta, Slovakia, and Slovenia all overtook Portugal in terms of GDP (PPP) per head. Greece had been a regular comparison point for Portugal since EU adhesion as both countries were formerly ruled by authoritarian governments and share similar EU-membership history, number of inhabitants, market size and tastes, national economies, Mediterranean culture, sunny weather, and tourist appeal; however, the Greek economic and financial wealth of the first five years of the 21st century was artificially boosted and was hampered by lack of sustainability, leading to the euro area crisis. Portuguese GDP per head has fallen from just over 80% of the EU 25 average in 1999 to just over 70% in 2007. This poor performance of the Portuguese economy was explored in April 2007 by The Economist, which described Portugal as "a new sick man of Europe". From 2002 to 2007, the unemployment rate increased by 65%; the number of unemployed citizens grew from 270,500 in 2002 to 448,600 in 2007. By December 2009, the unemployment rate had passed the 10% mark.

Overall, the late 1990s and the first decade of the 21st century were marked by a lagging economy where Portugal not only failed to catch up to the EU average, but actually fell behind for a period. The Common Agriculture Policy, a system of European Union agricultural subsidies and programmes, ultimately enforced a ban on agriculture in areas where agriculture had traditionally been done, ensuring that Portugal could not be self-sufficient in a number of competitive products. Public expenditure rose to unsustainable levels and the number of public servants, which had been on the rise since the 1974 Carnation Revolution, reached unprecedented proportions. State-funded and supported construction projects such as those related to the Expo 98 World Fair in Lisbon, the 2004 European Football Championship, and a number of new motorways, proved to have little positive effect in fostering sustainable growth. The short-term impact of these major investments was exhausted by the end of the first decade of the 21st century, and the aim of achieving faster economic growth and the improvement of the population's purchasing power in relation to the EU average did not materialize. To make matters worse, the late 2000s recession, when much of the industrialized world entered a deep recession, led to increased unemployment and a downturn.

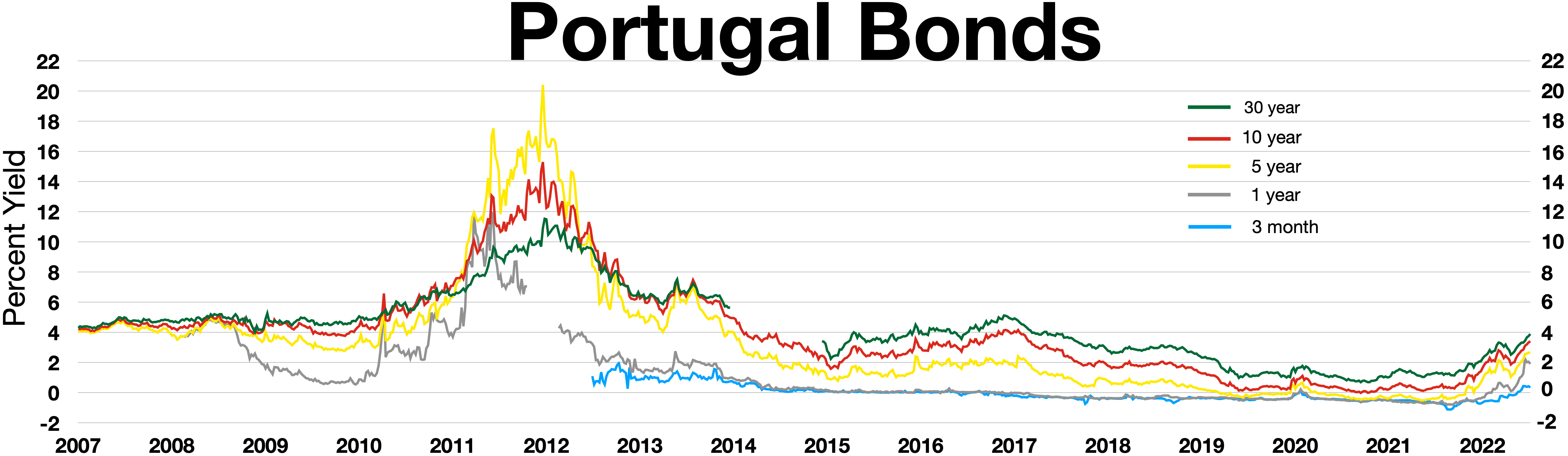
Portugal bonds during Portuguese financial crisis 30 year bond 10 year bond 5 year bond 1 year bond 3 month bond

In December 2009, ratings agency Standard and Poor's lowered its long-term credit assessment of Portugal from "stable" to "negative", voicing pessimism on the country's structural economic weaknesses and poor competitiveness, which would hamper growth and the capacity to strengthen its public finances and reduce debt. Lack of government regulation; easy lending in the housing market, including Spain's and US markets, meant anyone could qualify for a home loan with no government regulations in place, and with key players, including bankers and politicians in several countries, making the wrong financial decisions, saw the world's biggest financial collapse. Portugal had to add a chronic public servant overcapacity problem, a severe sovereign debt crisis and a small, relatively weak, economy to the equation.

Notwithstanding the bad macroeconomic environment, modern non-traditional technology-based industries like aerospace, biotechnology and information technology, were developed in several locations across the country. Alverca, Covilhã, Évora, and Ponte de Sor became the main centres of Portuguese aerospace industry, led by Brazil-based company Embraer and the Portuguese company OGMA. Since after the turn of the 21st century, many major biotechnology and information technology industries were founded and proliferated in the metropolitan areas of Lisbon, Porto, Braga, Coimbra and Aveiro.

==== Evolution of the number of public employees (government employees) in Portugal (1968–2021) ====
Year^{A}	Number of Public Employees
1968	196.755
1979	383,103
1983	435,795
1986	464,321
1988	485,368
1991	509,732
1996	614,256
1999	701,911
2005	731,485
2006	N/A
2007	N/A
2008	N/A
2009	N/A
2010	N/A
2011	727,701
2012	699,947
2013	674,896
2014	656,363
2015	659,138
2016	664,162
2017	669,365
2018	683,162
2019	698,924
2020	718,761
2021	733,896 (Provisional)

Between 1991 and 2005, the number of public employees in Portugal increased 221,753 employees while the population remained almost unchanged, along with a sharp and rapid increase in average wages and other bonuses paid to them, but productivity remained low comparing to most of the other EU member states, the US and Canada for years to come.

==== The BPN and BPP bailouts ====
During the global economic crisis, it was known around the 2008–2009 period that two Portuguese banks (Banco Português de Negócios (BPN) and Banco Privado Português (BPP)) had accumulated losses for numerous years due to bad investments, embezzlement and accounting fraud. The case of BPN, a bank that was nationalised by the government in November 2008 to avoid systemic risk, was particularly serious due to its size, market share and the political implications—Portugal's president at the time Cavaco Silva, as well as some of his political allies, maintained personal and business relationships with the bank and its CEO, José Oliveira e Costa (a former junior minister in the government led by Cavaco Silva) and the latter was eventually charged and arrested for fraud and other crimes. To avoid a potentially serious financial crisis for the Portuguese economy, the Portuguese government agreed to provide the two banks with monetary bailouts at a future loss to taxpayers.

Following the government's decision, the role of Banco de Portugal (BdP) (Portuguese Central Bank) in the regulation and supervision of the Portuguese banking system while it was under the leadership of Vítor Constâncio—from 2000 to 2010—has been a fiercely debated subject; especially in regard to whether Constâncio and the BdP had the means to take action or whether they displayed gross incompetence. In December 2010, Constâncio was appointed as the vice president of the European Central Bank for an eight-year mandate and assumed responsibility for supervision of the bank. Shortly afterwards, in April 2011, the Portuguese Government requested international financial assistance, as the State declared insolvency.

=== 2010–2014 Portuguese financial crisis ===
According to a report by the Diário de Notícias Portugal had gradually allowed considerable slippage in state-managed public works, as well as inflated top management and head officer bonuses and wages, since the Carnation Revolution in 1974 to the reckoning of an alarming equity and sustainability crisis in 2010. Also, established recruitment policies boosted the number of redundant public servants, while risky credit, public debt creation, and European structural and cohesion funds were mismanaged over nearly four decades. When the global crisis disrupted the markets and the world economy, together with the subprime mortgage crisis and the euro area crisis, Portugal, with all of its structural problems—from the colossal public debt to the civil service's overcapacity—was one of the first and most affected economies to succumb.

In the summer of 2010, Moody's Investors Service reduced Portugal's sovereign bond rating and this led to increased pressure on Portuguese government bonds.

On 6 April 2011, Portugal asks for a bailout. After a debt issue with excessively high costs, Portuguese finance minister Teixeira dos Santos forces the request for a bailout with statements to the Jornal de Negócios in which he admits that it will have to be done. Portugal's Prime Minister José Sócrates and his Socialist Party (PS) government, out of options, announced to the nation in the early evening that Portugal would formalise a request to the IMF and the European Union. Portugal requested a €78 billion IMF-EU bailout package, announced by José Sócrates on 3 May 2011, in a bid to stabilise its public finances, as decades-long governmental overspending and an over-bureaucratised civil service was no longer tenable.

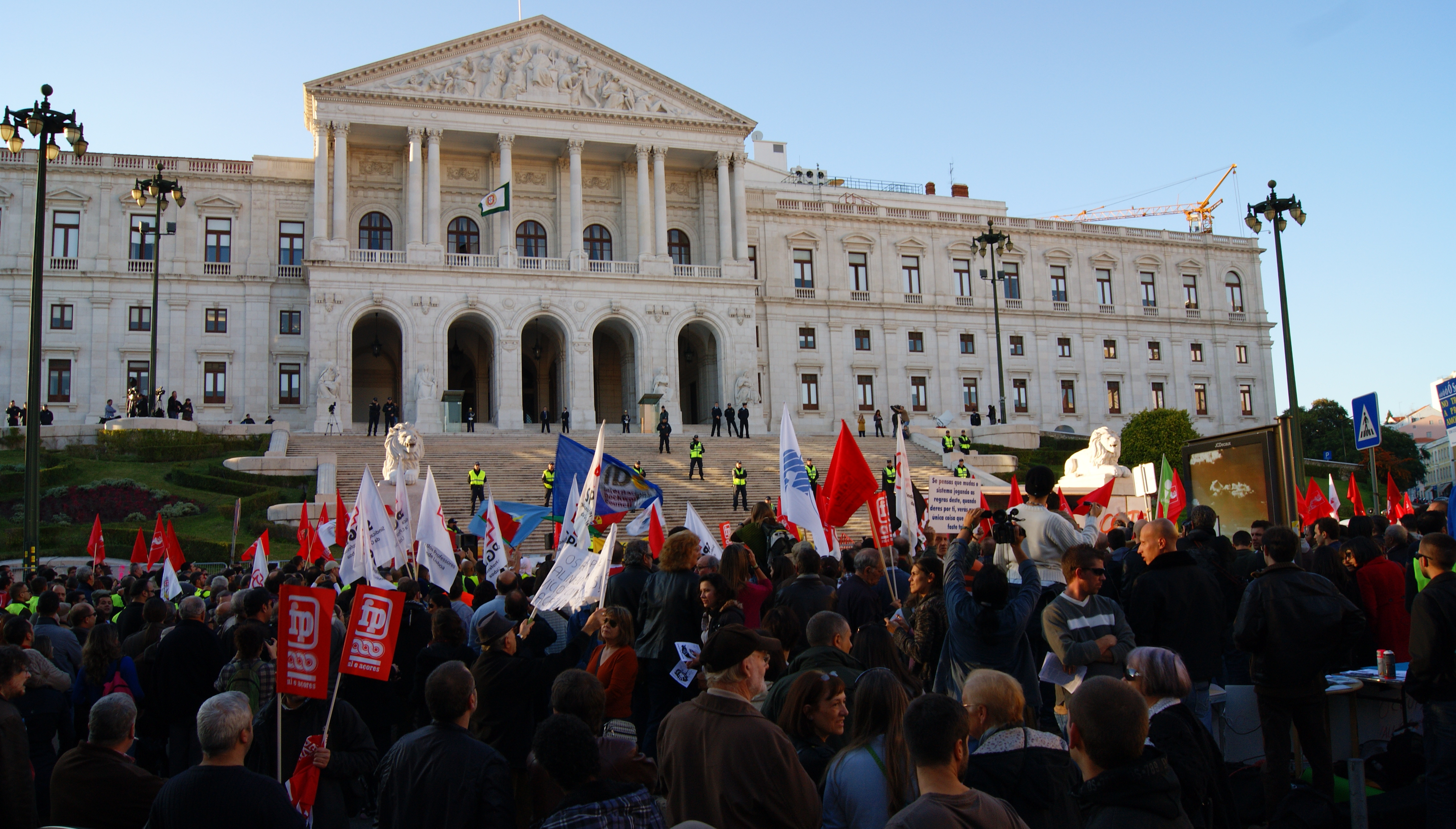
November 2011 protests against austerity measures of the Economic Adjustment Programme for Portugal outside the Assembly of the Republic

After the bailout was announced, the Portuguese government—headed by Pedro Passos Coelho—managed to implement measures to improve the State's financial situation and the country was seen to be moving in the right direction; however, this also led to heavy social costs such as a prominent rise in the unemployment rate to over 15 per cent in the second quarter of 2012. The expectations of a further increase were fulfilled, as the first quarter of 2013 signified a new unemployment rate record for Portugal of 17.7 per cent—up from 16.9 per cent in the previous quarter—and the government predicted an 18.5 per cent unemployment rate in 2014. The unpopular and controversial measures pursued by the Conservative government of Pedro Passos Coelho (some openly exceeding what was requested by the Memorandum of Understanding with the Troika, such as widespread privatisations, flexibilization of labor laws or the elimination of public holidays) made writer and political analyst Miguel Sousa Tavares to coin the term "right-wing PREC" (PREC de direita) in a comparison with the controversial measures taken in 1975 by the Communist-backed government of Vasco Gonçalves which led to a significant fall in the Portuguese economy and standards of living following the 25 de Abril revolution.

=== Economic recovery post-2014 ===
Even if limited in scope and arguably incomplete, the acceptance and implementation of a number of EU-IMF troika recommendations by the Portuguese authorities led to the stabilization of the Portuguese public finances, put a halt to the fast deterioration of productivity levels in the country and improved the competitiveness of the Portuguese economy as well as the attractiveness of Portugal as a foreign direct investment destination. The International Monetary Fund issued an update report on the economy of Portugal in late June 2017 with a strong near-term outlook and an increase in investments and exports over previous years. Because of a surplus in 2016, the country was no longer bound by the Excessive Deficit Procedure which had been implemented during an earlier financial crisis. The banking system was more stable, although there were still non-performing loans and corporate debt. The IMF recommended working on solving these problems for Portugal to be able to attract more private investment. "Sustained strong growth, together with continued public debt reduction, would reduce vulnerabilities arising from high indebtedness, particularly when monetary accommodation is reduced." However, new socialist governments which took the power after the departure of the troika, from 2016 to 2020, reverted many of those reforms in such a way that prompted criticism from the part of the European Commission, the European Central Bank and the International Monetary Fund.

By 2021, Portugal's GDP (PPP) was $36,381 per capita, according to OECD's report. It was the 4th lowest GDP per capita (PPP) of the eurozone out of 19 members, and the 8th lowest of the European Union out of 27 member-states, with several former economically disadvantaged Communist Bloc countries which in the meanwhile had become Eastern European member-states of the EU, nearly reaching or surpassing Portugal in terms of GDP (PPP) per capita around this date. Also in 2021, labour productivity had fallen to the fifth lowest among the 27 member-states of the European Union (EU) and was 35% lower than the EU average, with only Latvia, Poland, Bulgaria, and Greece being lower to Portugal in that parameter. In 2022, it had fallen to the fourth lowest position despite the fact that at this stage it had been a net beneficiary to the European Union budget since it joined the union, then known as EEC, in 1986.

In 2022, being already the 8th poorest country of the European Union, Portugal was on the verge of becoming by 2030 the 3rd or 4th poorest country in the European Union, out of 27 member states. Poverty increased in 2022 and affected 17% of the population by then. According to the National Statistics Institute (INE), the increase in poverty covered all age groups. Homelessness had increased from 6,044 homeless persons in 2018 to 10,773 in 2022, which represented an increase of 78% in four years. By 2023, Portugal was the country in Europe with the most emigrants. In 20 years, 15 per cent of the population emigrated. In terms of the proportion of the population, Portugal was the country in Europe with the most emigrants and 8th in the world.

== See also ==
- Economic history
- Economy of Portugal
- Economic history of Europe
- Economic history of the world
- Elmina Castle
- Company of Guinea
- Fort Jesus
- Portuguese Empire
- Mozambique Company
- Macau
- Nagasaki
- Niassa Company
- Portuguese East India Company
- Jerónimo Martins
- Portuguese India
- Portuguese West Africa
- Economic history of Brazil
- Economy of Angola
- Portuguese escudo
- Slavery in Portugal
- Industrial Revolution
