= Conservas Ramirez =

Portuguese producer of canned fish products

Ramirez & Cia (Filhos), SA is a Portuguese producer of canned fish products, such as tuna and sardines with tomato sauce. It also produces other foodstuffs such as canned salads. Manuel Guerreiro Ramirez, great-grandson of the founder Sebastian Ramirez, was the owner until his death in 2022.

== Profile and history ==
The company was founded in 1853. As the first canned fish undertaking in the country, the Vila Real de Santo António plant in the southern Portuguese region of Algarve was the cradle of the sector in Portugal. Applying the principle discovered by Nicholas Appert, and later drawn up into the theories of Louis Pasteur, it revolutionized the concept of food conservation in Portugal. At the start of the 20th century, exportation of products began and the first sardine steam ship was launched to the sea (in 1908), it was named Nossa Senhora da Encarnação. By the 2000s, with 250 employees, it had plants in Leça da Palmeira and Peniche, and sold 40 million cans/year exporting 45% of its production which is commercialized under its own brands.

== Internationalization ==
Created in 1853 Ramirez is present in the Portuguese market and in 50 international markets with a range of 55 canned fish varieties and sixteen brands. Ramirez's internationalization process began at the end of the 19th century, creating brands such as Cocagne in the Benelux countries (exported since 1906). Tomé in the Philippines, Canada, and the United States, Al-Fares in the Arab world, or Gabriel in South Africa are all brands of the Portuguese company. Exportation of Ramirez's canned fish products continues to grow in the markets of Austria, Spain, Belgium, the Netherlands, Luxembourg, France, Brazil, England, Switzerland, South Africa, Canada, USA, Venezuela, Angola, Mozambique, Germany, Israel, Japan, China, and Australia.

== Quality certification ==
Ramirez possesses its own laboratory and complies with the HACCP system. The Ramirez quality control system has been ratified by control departments such as the Canadian Fisheries Inspection Agency (CFIA), South African Bureau Standards (SABS), European Food Safety Inspection Service (EFSIS), Food and Drugs Administration (FDA of the USA).

Ramirez has obtained the Quality Management System certification, governed by the NP EN ISO 9001:2000 standard, attributed by SGS, a quality certification service. Ramirez has become the first Portuguese canned fish company to be accredited by SGS.

== Healthy eating ==
The Ramirez Nutrition Centre, CENUTRA, set up by Ramirez, with scientific support from the Faculty of Nutrition and Food Sciences (Faculdade de Ciências da Nutrição e Alimentação) of Porto University, sponsors scientific research in health, nutrition and food sciences, especially geared towards canned fish and its benefits.

The CENUTRA aims to seek scientific knowledge that will lead to a healthy diet and disseminate it among the community. The goal is to help to promote the Mediterranean diet. Canned sardines have a high content of proteins and also vitamins B1, B2, PP, calcium, phosphorus, iron and copper.

== Sponsorship ==
=== Education and science ===
As a sponsor of the “Hypercluster da Economia do Mar” (Hypercluster of the Sea Economy), RAMIREZ seeks through these synergies with the Porto Sea Life Center to raise awareness among the population of conservation of sea life and the strategic importance of the sea for Portugal and the planet earth.

=== Sports ===
As of 2022, Conservas Ramirez is the main jersey sponsor of the men's professional basketball team of Sport Lisboa e Benfica.
