= Logoplaste =

Portuguese packaging company

Logoplaste logo

Logoplaste is a Portuguese company, producing rigid plastic packaging.

Logoplaste was incorporated in 1976, pioneering in-house manufacturing in Europe, with the “Hole in the Wall” concept. ("Hole in the Wall" is industry jargon, describing the process of installing a plant that manufactures plastic packaging immediately next door to the plant where the product is filled, reducing shipping costs, secondary packaging and CO2e emissions.) The company is now managing over 70 plants today across North America, Europe, South America and South East Asia and is active across the Home Care, Personal Care, Food, Dairy, Pharma end markets. Logoplaste is headquartered in Cascais and serves large fast moving consumer products companies. In 2016 a majority stake was sold to Carlyle Private Equity fund to help fund the growth and in 2021 the fund sold its majority stake to Ontario Teachers Pension Plan, while the founding family remains a relevant shareholder.

== History ==
- 1976 – Start of the operations with Yoplait (yoghurts) and Nestlé (caps)
- 1980 – First large scale PVC operation in mineral water (Luso)
- 1989 – First PET operation with Coca-Cola in Portugal
- 1993 – First thin wall operation with Unilever in Portugal
- 1994 - Logoplaste goes International in Spain, with mineral waters
- 1995 – Start up of the Brazilian operation with Danone
- 1997 – Logoplaste enters the French market with an in-house plant operation for Coke and the first PET pre-form plant is started in Portugal, producing today over 900 million units per year
- 1998 – Logoplaste arrives in the UK market, with one large plant for Procter & Gamble. A similar plant for P&G is installed in Barcelona, Spain
- 2000 – A complex factory, incorporating injection and blowing of PET pre-forms is installed near London, producing Fairy Liquid bottles for the whole of Europe
- 2002 - LOGOPLASTE creates ILAB (LOGOPLASTE Innovation Lab). This structure concentrates activities of development for the group. Headquarters in Cascais/Portugal
- 2002 – Start up of the manufacturing of aseptic packages for UHT Milk in France and large size packages for Automotive Lubricants in Brazil
- 2003 – Start up of operations in Italy, with a large implant for Unilever household care products
- 2004 - Start up of operations with Arla Foods, in Leeds, manufacturing bottles for one of the most modern fresh milk factory in Europe.
- 2006 - Start of operations in North America with the purchase from Tetrapak of the Ottawa, Ontario, Canada blowing facility making flavoured milk and coffee additives bottles for the Neilson dairy.
- 2007 - Second North American plant in operation producing edible oil bottles for Sovena USA.
- 2009 - Start of operations in Vancouver and Edmonton Canada, manufacturing various HDPE milk jugs.
- 2010 - Start of operations in Coleford, UK, producing PET products for GSK
- - Creates ILAB USA. Development Branch of ILAB that will support activities of development in North America
- 2011 - LOGOPLASTE signs contracts for Vietnam. LOGOPLASTE has now 61 plants worldwide.
- - Creates ILAB Brazil. Development Branch for Brazil and Latin America
