= Amorim Energia =

Portuguese company based in Netherlands

Amorim Energia BV is a Portuguese company based in Amsterdam, Netherlands. Amorim Energia BV operates as a subsidiary of Amorim Investimentos e Participações, holding of the Amorim Group.

The Portuguese investor Americo Amorim controls, directly or indirectly, 55% of Amorim Energia, the other 45% is owned by the offshore holding Esperanza, owned by the Angolan state oil company Sonangol and the investor Isabel dos Santos. Sindika Dokolo, husband of Miss dos Santos is member of the board.

Amorim Energia holds 33.34% of the share capital of Galp Energia, Portugal's only oil and gas operator.
