= Isabel dos Santos =

Angolan businesswoman (born 1973)

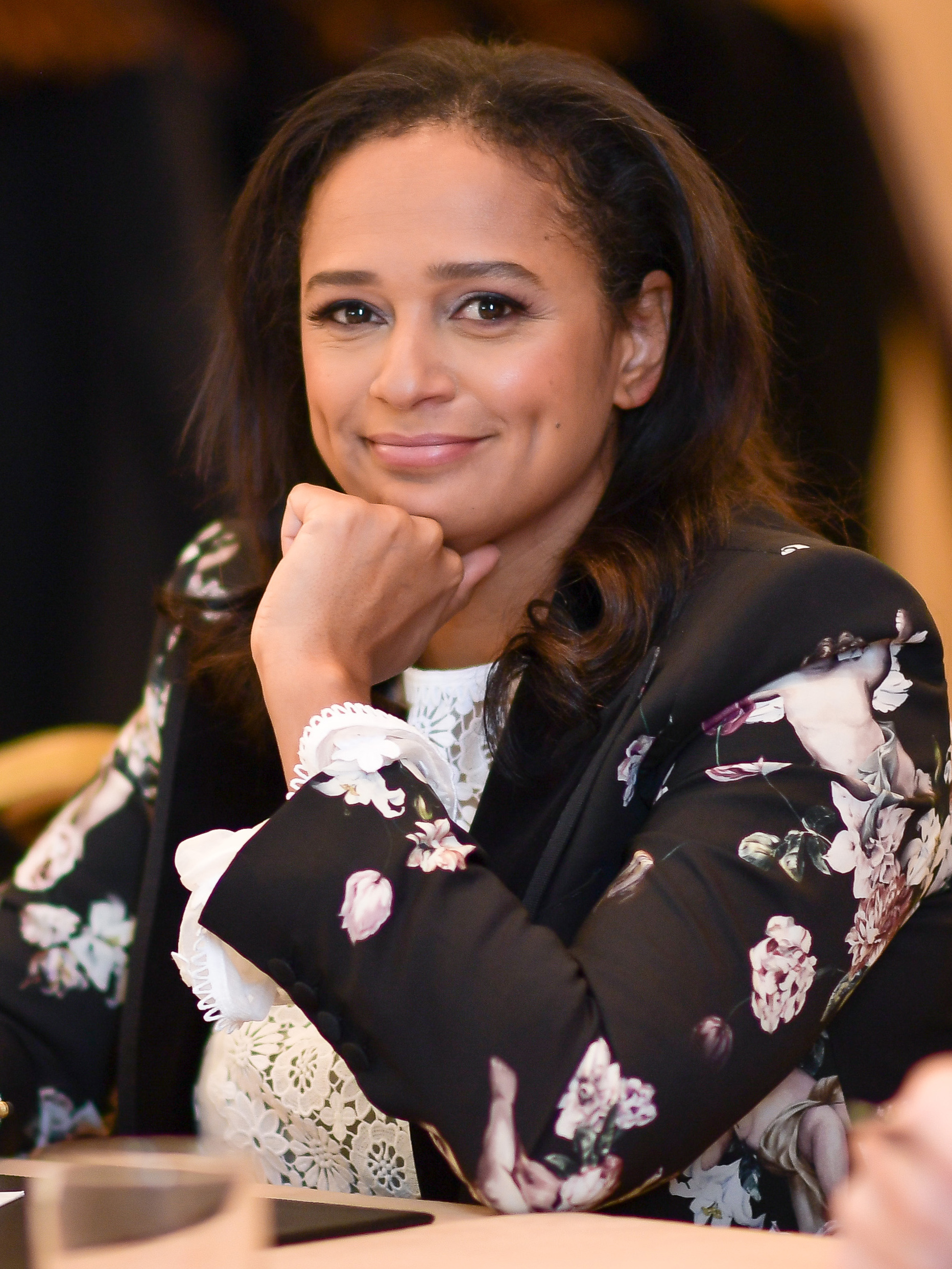
- Santos in 2019

Director of Sonangol
- In office 2 June 2016 – 17 November 2017
- President: José Eduardo dos Santos; João Lourenço

Personal details
- Born: Isabel Kukanova dos Santos; 20 April 1973 (age 53) Baku, Azerbaijan SSR, Soviet Union
- Citizenship: Russia and Angola
- Spouse: Sindika Dokolo (m. 2002; died 2020)
- Children: 3
- Parents: José Eduardo dos Santos; Tatiana Sergeievna Kukanova
- Relatives: José Filomeno dos Santos (brother); Coréon Dú (brother); Jose Manuel Gomes dos Santos (brother)
- Education: King's College London
- Occupation: Businesswoman

Isabel Kukanova dos Santos ([izɐˈβɛl duʃ ˈsɐ̃tuʃ]; born 20 April 1973) is an Angolan businesswoman, the eldest child of Angola's former President José Eduardo dos Santos, who ruled the country from 1979 to 2017.

As early as 2013 Forbes described how dos Santos acquired her wealth by taking stakes in companies doing business in Angola, suggesting that her wealth came almost entirely from her family's power and connections. Since 2018, the Angolan government has been trying to prosecute Isabel dos Santos for corruption that may have led to Angola's ongoing recession. On 30 December 2019, the Luanda Provincial Court ordered the freezing of dos Santos's Angolan bank accounts and the seizure of her stake in local companies, including Unitel (Angola) and Banco de Fomento Angola. Two weeks later, the Angolan Government announced it had prepared the legal battle to confiscate dos Santos's assets in Portugal, a process that is operative in the form of letters rogatory sent to Portugal to stop the transfer of funds from Banco Comercial Português to a Russian bank.

As of January 2020, she was under investigation in Portugal and has since taken on the United Arab Emirates as her official country of residence. In December 2021, the US State Department barred Dos Santos and her immediate family from entering the United States, citing "significant corruption by misappropriating public funds for her personal benefit". Once considered Africa's richest woman according to Forbes magazine, with a net worth exceeding US$2 billion, she was dropped from the magazine's list in January 2021 after the freezing of her assets in Angola, Portugal and the Netherlands. In 2021 a French court ruled that she was liable to pay $340 million to the Portuguese company PT Ventures. On 18 November 2022, Interpol issued a warrant for her arrest. In December 2023 her assets were frozen following a hearing at the High Court in London. In November 2024 British Foreign Secretary David Lammy sanctioned Dos Santos along with Dmytro Firtash and Aivars Lembergs, naming all three "Kleptocrats".

== Early life and education ==
Isabel Kukanova dos Santos was born in Baku, Azerbaijan Soviet Socialist Republic, the eldest daughter of Angola's longtime President José Eduardo dos Santos (1942–2022) and his first wife, the Russian-born Tatiana Sergeievna Kukanova, whom he met while studying in the then Soviet republic of Azerbaijan. Her father's parents came from São Tomé and Príncipe. She attended an all girls boarding school in Kent, Cobham Hall School, and St Paul's Girls' School in London. She studied electrical engineering at King's College in London.

== Career ==
In the early 90s, dos Santos started working as a project manager engineer for Urbana 2000, a subsidiary of Jembas Group, that had won a contract to clean and disinfect Luanda. Thereafter, she set up a trucking business. The widespread use of walkie-talkie technology paved the way for a subsequent foray into telecoms. In 1997, she started her first business, opening the Miami Beach Club, one of the first night clubs and beach restaurants on Luanda Island. In 1997, dos Santos entered the international business world, creating companies and holdings in Angola but mostly abroad, making substantial investments in high-profile enterprises, especially in Portugal. As of 2014, holdings of dos Santos included:

- Trans Africa Investment Services, a Gibraltar-based vehicle founded together with her mother for the diamond business
- Unitel International Holdings B.V.: change of name of Kento and Jadeium, based in Amsterdam, company vehicle for dos Santos' investment in telecommunications
- Santoro Finance: company vehicle for dos Santos' investment in Banco BPI based in Lisbon
- Esperaza Holding B.V.: based in Amsterdam, energy and oil
- Condis: a retail business based in Luanda

In June 2016, her father appointed her as chair of Sonangol, the Angolan state oil company. In November 2017, João Lourenço, the new Angolan President, fired her just two months after being sworn into office in the wake of similar appointments of children of the president to key posts.

On 30 December 2019, the Luanda Provincial Court ordered the preventive seizure of the personal bank accounts of dos Santos, her husband, Sindika Dokolo, and Mário Filipe Moreira Leite da Silva. According to the Attorney General's office, the three businesspeople entered into deals with the Angolan state through the companies SODIAM, a public diamond sales company, and Sonangol, the state oil company. With these deals, the Angolan state suffered a loss of $1.14 billion. The court produced a document showing that the assets and many others owned by dos Santos had been acquired using funds from two state-owned companies. In January 2020, the Portuguese Attorney-General's Office opened an investigation into a number of her operations after Ana Gomes, a Portuguese Member of the European Parliament laid charges against her. Following the seizure, she assumed the UAE as her official country of residence. In January 2021, Forbes removed her from the list of the richest people in Africa, since her assets in Angola and Portugal had been frozen.

=== Investments in Portugal ===
Since 2008 dos Santos has had interests in key Portuguese sectors, such as telecommunications, media, retail, finance and energy. In 2012 dos Santos made a series of acquisitions in ZON Multimédia, a telecommunications and media company providing mobile and fixed telephony, cable television, satellite television and internet. From an initial small stake in the company, she became the biggest shareholder, with 28.8% in 2012. The acquisitions were made via holding companies Jadeium and Kento, later Netherlands-based Unitel International Holdings BV.

In 2010, she bought a 20% stake at Banco Português de Investimento through Santoro Holding . She has other major stakes with the Angolan state oil company Sonangol through their mutual European Law holding, based in the Netherlands, named Esperanza Holding, in Portuguese Galp Energia. Dos Santos is a founding member and board member of Banco BIC Português, which recently acquired Banco Português de Negócios, a nationalized bank.

In December 2012, dos Santos announced the invitation for a merger of ZON with Sonaecom, approved in March 2013 by the General Assembly. Since her investments in Portugal were in listed companies they were subject to official supervision of the Portuguese Securities Market Commission (Comissão do Mercado de Valores Mobiliários, CMVM, in Portuguese).

On 27 August 2013, after the green light from the Competition Authority, the merger of the two companies was formalized with the transfer to ZOPT, a special purpose vehicle created to advance the operation, which became the owner of more 50% of the capital of the new group, the shares that dos Santos and Sonaecom hold on Zon and Optimus respectively. There was a capital increase of ZOPT through contribution in kind from 50 to 716 million euros, while Sonaecom subscribed 358 million shares of the company, by delivering 81.8% of its stake in Optimus. The Angolan businesswoman, on her turn, subscribed exactly the same number of shares of ZOPT, through her holdings Kento and Unitel International, delivering 28.8% of the stake in ZON. With this transfer of shareholdings in Optimus and Zon, Sonaecom and dos Santos became holders of over 50% stake in the merged company: Zon Optimus SGPS. On this occasion, a new strategy for the company was announced by dos Santos, with a multimarket vision. On 1 October 2013, dos Santos attended the first General Assembly of Zon Optimus.

In November 2014, dos Santos launched a takeover bid for Portugal Telecom, SGPS, S.A., valuing the firm's shares at €1.35 a share, in what was seen as a rival bid to a previous €7 billion offer from Altice, though the offer made by Altice was on PT Portugal, not on PT SGPS. On 1 December 2014, she formally registered her offer at the Portuguese Securities Market Commission.

In January 2017 Unitel, led by dos Santos, purchased 2% of Banco Fomento de Angola (BFA) from BPI for 28 million euros and controlled 51.9% of the bank's capital. In December 2016 the National Bank of Angola (BNA), the sector regulator, had approved this operation. In February 2017 dos Santos sold her position in Banco BPI, following the takeover bid launched by CaixaBank. From her ownership from 2009 to 2017 she won more than 80 million euros in capital gain, not only from the sale of the 18.5% holding on BPI, but also from the dividends from 2008 and 2009, worth around 12.6 million euros.

=== Investments in Angola ===
In April 2011, dos Santos with 51% control of Condis, signed a joint partnership with the Portuguese Sonae group for the development and operation of a retail trading company in Angola. The entry in Angola by the Portuguese group led by Paulo de Azevedo was to be performed by the Continente (Angola), which planned to open the first supermarket by 2013 in Angola.

She created Unitel (Angola) in partnership with Portugal Telecom, after a tender process she considered fair. As of 2013, she had acquired the mobile operator T+ in Cape Verde also through Unitel International Holding, a platform for Unitel investments where Portugal telecom has no presence, and gained the license to establish the second telecom operator in São Tomé and Príncipe. In May 2013, dos Santos announced during a visit to São Tomé and Príncipe that Unitel would invest in education in the country to train engineers, managers and other technicians and also focus on job creation.

By 2015, dos Santos owned a share of satellite-TV operator ZAP, which had in December 2013 acquired the rights to distribute Forbes in a number of Portuguese-speaking countries, namely Portugal, Angola, and Mozambique. It had been announced that most of the content would be produced by a local team, complemented by content for the North American edition, therefore potentially allowing influence on Forbes content. It was initially planned that the first edition of the Portuguese language Forbes would be published during the second quarter of 2014.

In October 2022, Angolan President President João Lourenço issued a decision to nationalise the Angolan operator Unitel, ending her links with the operator.

=== Prosecution for corruption, 2018-present ===
Since 2018, the Angolan government has been trying to prosecute Isabel dos Santos for corruption which may have led to Angola's recession. On 30 December 2019, the Luanda Provincial Court ordered to freeze dos Santos's Angolan bank accounts and to seize her stake in local companies, including Unitel (Angola) and Banco de Fomento Angola. In January 2019, the Angolan Government announced it prepared the legal battle to confiscate dos Santos's assets in Portugal, and sent letters rogatory to Portugal to stop the transfer of funds from Banco Comercial Português to a Russian bank.

As of January 2020, she was under investigation in Portugal and has since assumed the United Arab Emirates as her official country of residence. In December 2021, the US State Department barred Dos Santos and her immediate family from entering the United States, citing "significant corruption by misappropriating public funds for her personal benefit". On May 27, 2022 she was still photographed smiling at the Cannes Film Festival.

On 18 November 2022, Interpol issued a warrant for her arrest. As of 2023, she lived in Dubai, and made at least one trip to Qatar. In December 2023, she lost a legal battle in London’s High Court to prevent a freeze on up to £580 million ($733 million) of her assets. In January 2024 she was accused by the Angolan high court to have used "offshore companies, fraudulent invoices, forged documents and “exorbitant” salary raises to illegally pocket millions".

On November 21, 2024, the British government sanctioned Isabel dos Santos. The British government froze her assets in the United Kingdom and banned Isabel Dos Santos from traveling to the country.

=== Luanda Leaks, 2020 ===
On 19 January 2020 the International Consortium of Investigative Journalists (ICIJ) published a detailed report on how dos Santos amassed her wealth over the years. The report, based on information provided by corruption watchdog The Platform to Protect Whistleblowers in Africa – which it called Luanda Leaks – said she "made a fortune at the expense of the Angolan people".

The night of 22 January, three days after the leaks, her personal wealth manager and private banking director Nuno Ribeiro da Cunha was found dead in the garage of his house.

== Personal life ==
Dos Santos was married to Congolese businessman Sindika Dokolo, son of a millionaire from Kinshasa, Augustin Dokolo, and his Danish wife, Hanne Kruse. Sindika Dokolo died in a diving accident in Dubai in October 2020 at the age of 48. She lives in Dubai.

== Recognition ==
She was recognized as one of the BBC's 100 Women of 2015.
