= Soyo I Thermal Power Station =

Angolan power station

- Location of Soyo I Thermal Power Station in Angola
- Country: Angola
- Location: Soyo, Zaire Province
- Coordinates: 06°07′06″S 12°20′20″E
- Status: Under construction
- Commission date: 2022 (Expected)
- Owner: Luxerviza
- Operator: Empresa Pública de Produção de Electricidade

Thermal power station
- Primary fuel: Natural gas
- Secondary fuel: Butane
- Tertiary fuel: Diesel fuel
- Combined cycle?: Yes

Power generation
- Nameplate capacity: 750 MW (1,010,000 hp)

Soyo I Thermal Power Station is a 750 MW (1,010,000 hp) natural gas-fired thermal power plant under construction in the town of Soyo in the Zaire Province of Angola.

== Location ==
The power station is located in the city of Soyo, in Angola's Zaire Province, approximately 490 kilometres (304 mi) northwest of Luanda, the capital and largest city in the country.

== Overview ==
The power station is owned and operated by Luxerviza, a subsidiary company of the Sonangol Group, that manages natural gas plants. The power station supplies electricity to the city of Soyo and neighboring communities. The surplus power is integrated into the Angolan national electricity grid, to supply other communities, including Luanda. The plant uses natural gas, sourced from the Soyo LNG Plant and various national oil blocks.

== Operation ==
The construction of this power station started in 2015. In 2017 the plant started producing electricity, beginning with 22 megawatts supplied to the city of Soyo. By April 2018, generation capacity had expanded to 388 megawatts. The original construction was performed by China National Machinery Industry Corporation (Sinomach), using electromechanical equipment supplied by Sepco, another Chinese company. The initial construction cost was reported to be US$900 million.

== Expansion ==
In November 2018, the government of Angola contracted an American consortium comprising Aenergy and General Electric, to upgrade the power station and increase its generation capacity to 750 megawatts. The contract price is US$220 million. The power station's new output is sufficient to supply over 3 million Angolan households. The upgrade and expansion are expected to conclude in 2022.

== See also ==
- List of power stations in Angola
