= Swimming at the 1979 Pan American Games – Women's 200 metre butterfly =

Women's 200 metre butterfly at the 1979 Pan American Games
- Venue: Piscina Olimpica Del Escambron
- Dates: July 7 (preliminaries and finals)
- Competitors: from - nations

Medalists
Gold medal	Mary T. Meagher	United States
Silver medal	Karinne Miller	United States
Bronze medal	Nancy Garapick	Canada

The Women's 200m Butterfly competition of the swimming events at the 1979 Pan American Games took place on 7 July at the Piscina Olimpica Del Escambron in San Juan, Puerto Rico. The last Pan American Games champion was Camille Wright of US.

This race consisted of four lengths of the pool, all lengths being in butterfly stroke.

== Results ==
All times are in minutes and seconds.

KEY:	q	Fastest non-qualifiers	Q	Qualified	GR	Games record	NR	National record	PB	Personal best	SB	Seasonal best

=== Heats ===
The first round was held on July 7.

Rank	Name	Nationality	Time	Notes
1	Mary T. Meagher	United States	2:16.33	Q
2	Kelly Albright	Canada	2:17.45	Q
3	Karinne Miller	United States	2:18.04	Q
4	Shelley Cramer	U.S. Virgin Islands	2:18.20	Q
5	Nancy Garapick	Canada	2:18.57	Q
6	Rosanna Juncos	Argentina	2:22.51	Q
7	Maria Hung	Venezuela	2:26.68	Q
8	Paula Amorim	Brazil	2:26.85	Q
9	Maria Paris	Costa Rica	2:26.93	
10	Lisa Escalera	Puerto Rico	2:32.59	
11	Adriana Pereira	Brazil	DQ	

=== Final ===
The final was held on July 7.

Rank	Name	Nationality	Time	Notes
1st place, gold medalist(s)	Mary T. Meagher	United States	2:09.77	WR
2nd place, silver medalist(s)	Karinne Miller	United States	2:15.05	
3rd place, bronze medalist(s)	Nancy Garapick	Canada	2:16.40	
4	Kelly Albright	Canada	2:16.77	
5	Shelley Cramer	U.S. Virgin Islands	2:17.78	NR
6	Rosanna Juncos	Argentina	2:24.51	
7	Paula Amorim	Brazil	2:26.47	
8	Maria Hung	Venezuela	2:29.09	
