= Américo Amorim =

Portuguese billionaire businessman (1934 - 2017)

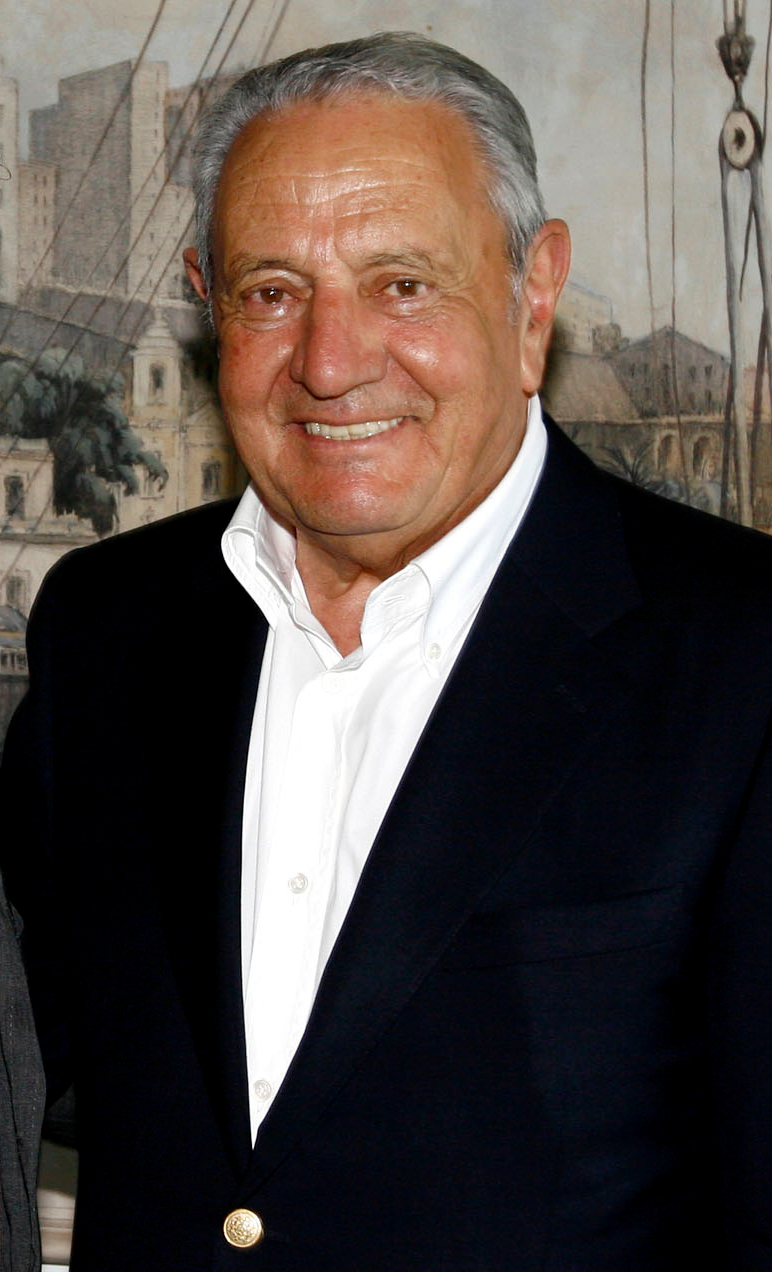
- Américo Amorim in 2009
- Born: Américo Ferreira Amorim; 21 July 1934; Mozelos, Santa Maria da Feira, Portugal
- Died: 13 July 2017 (aged 82); Grijo, Portugal
- Occupation(s): Heir, investor
- Known for: 50% interest in Corticeira Amorim
- Spouse: Married
- Children: 3, including Paula Amorim

Américo Ferreira Amorim (21 July 1934 – 13 July 2017) was a Portuguese billionaire businessman, and a 50% owner of Corticeira Amorim, founded by his grandfather. He was the richest person in Portugal at the time of his death with a fortune estimated of $4.8 billion.

== Early life ==
Amorim was born in Mozelos in 1934, the fifth of eight children of Américo Alves Amorim, into a "modest family".

== Career ==
He owned a 50% interest in Corticeira Amorim, founded by his grandfather in 1870, and the world's largest producer of cork, with $650 million in sales.

He had interests in finance and energy. In 2005, he and Isabel dos Santos established Angola's Banco Internacional de Credito (BIC). On 22 April 2008, Banco BIC Portugal began its operations in Lisbon with the same ownership structure as Banco BIC Angola. (Note: In 2017, Banco BIC Portugal changed its name to EuroBic.) In 2008, BIC Angola was the fourth largest in Angola behind only Banco Popular de Crédito, Banco Africano de Investimento, and Banco Fomento Angola. Later, in 2014, he sold his stake in BIC to Isabel dos Santos. His largest investment was an 18% stake in Galp Energia which he was chairman until October 2016 when he passed control to his eldest daughter Paula.

== Personal life ==
Américo Amorim was married to Maria Fernanda de Oliveira Ramos, the daughter of medical doctor Manuel Pinto Moreira Ramos and Maria José Nunes de Oliveira, and had three daughters, including Paula. They lived in Grijó.

He died on 13 July 2017.
