= Zippy Kidstore =

Portuguese brand specialized in babies and infants

Zippy
- Industry: Retail
- Founded: 2004
- Headquarters: Matosinhos, Porto, Portugal
- Website: www.zippykidstore.com

Zippy is a Portuguese brand specialized in babies and infants, that serves parents and children from birth to preteen. It offers a wide range of clothing and accessories, childcare products, furniture and toys, at very affordable prices.

Integrated in Sonae's universe, the brand opened in March 2004 in GaiaShopping, and has 38 stores in Portugal. Currently Zippy is present in 20 countries with over 100 stores.

In November 2014, to celebrate its ten years of existence, Zippy introduced a more modern and interactive store concept, with new technologies such as digital displays and a digital "playground" where children can play.

In addition, Zippy also launched new services for families, as custom childcare counseling sessions, breastfeeding pump rental and replacement trolleys in case of failure.

In 2014 the brand also launched its online store, available in Portugal and Spain.

== Innovation ==
Zippy was the first children's clothing brand in the world to incorporate a colorblind code in its products – ColorADD – allowing an easy and correct identification of colors, in the Spring-Summer 2013 collection.

In June 2015, Zippy launched the first line of children T-shirts with mosquitoes repellent, having already launched a T-shirts line with Ultraviolet Protection Factor. Also in 2015, the brand announced the antibacterial baby line, which inhibits the spread of bacteria.

== Awards ==
Zippy was elected "Trusted Brand" for the 3rd consecutive year in the children's clothing stores and childcare category.

Zippy was also voted “Best Brand” in 2015 in the Fashion category by Marketeer, a Portuguese magazine.

== Internationalization ==
The brand's internationalization started in 2009, in Spain, where Sonae SR began operating outside Portugal. Today Sonae continues to make a strong commitment in expanding Zippy.

In September 2010, Zippy began its expansion in the Middle East with the opening of stores in Saudi Arabia. In June 2011 was the opening of the first Zippy store in Turkey. In July, the brand arrived in Egypt. In August, Zippy opened the first store in Kazakhstan.

In August 2012, Sonae announced the opening of Zippy stores in Lebanon. In October, was the announcement of Zippy's entry in Azerbaijan and Dominican Republic. In November, Sonae opened the first two Zippy stores in Venezuela.

In March 2013, Sonae exported Zippy for the Moroccan market, extending its presence to North Africa. In September 2013, the first Zippy store opened in Jordan and, in October, in Qatar. In 2013 Zippy also started the wholesale channel which currently has over 175 retail outlets worldwide.

In the first quarter of 2014 the brand arrived in Armenia and Kuwait. In the third quarter of 2014, Zippy expanded its activity in Latin America with the opening of the first store in Chile and opened its first store in Georgia, strengthening its presence in the Caucasus.

In March 2015, Sonae opened the first Zippy store in Ecuador under the expansion plan in Latin America. In May, Zippy opened its first store in Iraq (Kurdistan), expanding the brand's presence in the Middle East. In September, the brand announced the entry into four new countries of Central America: El Salvador, Costa Rica, Nicaragua and Guatemala.
