= Coral gas field =

Natural gas field offshore Cabo Delgado Province, Mozambique

Coral
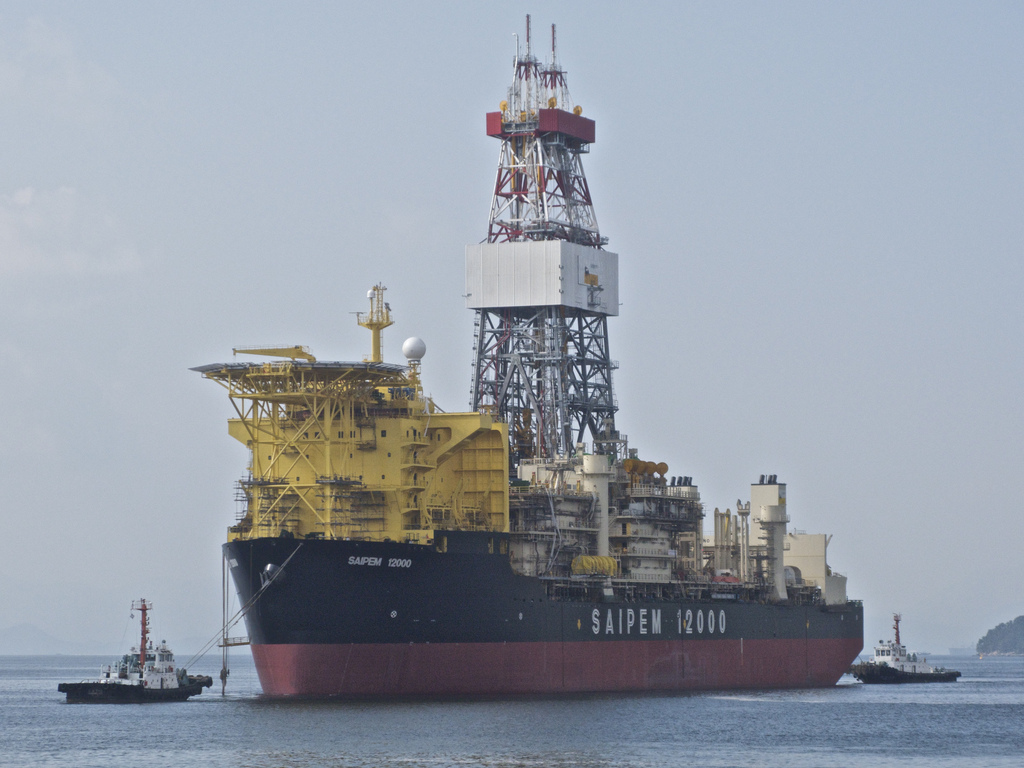
- Saipem 12000 ultra-deep water drillship
- Country: Mozambique
- Region: Cabo Delgado Province
- Location: Rovuma Basin
- Offshore/onshore: offshore
- Operator: Eni

Field history
- Discovery: 2012
- Start of development: 2017
- Start of production: 2022

Production
- Current production of gas: 2.9×10^{6} m^{3}/d 100×10^{6} cu ft/d 1×10^{9} m^{3}/a (35×10^{9} cu ft/a)
- Estimated gas in place: 286×10^{9} m^{3} 10×10^{12} cu ft

The Coral gas field is a natural gas field located offshore the Cabo Delgado Province of Mozambique. Discovered in 2012, it was developed by Eni, determining it to have initial total proven reserves of around 10 trillion ft^{3} (286 km^{3}). It began production of natural gas and condensates in 2022, with a production rate of around 100 million ft^{3}/day (2.9×10^{5} m^{3}).

== Recent investments ==
In May 2024, ADNOC (Abu Dhabi National Oil Company) acquired a 10% stake in the Area 4 concession. This included interests in Coral South FLNG, planned Coral North FLNG, and the onshore Rovuma LNG facilities, combining for over 25 million tonnes per annum (Mtpa) of capacity Reuters. Galp Energia, which previously held this stake, received around $650 million, with additional contingent payments tied to future decisions for Coral North and Rovuma LNG.
