= Sindika Dokolo =

Congolese art collector and businessman (1972–2020)

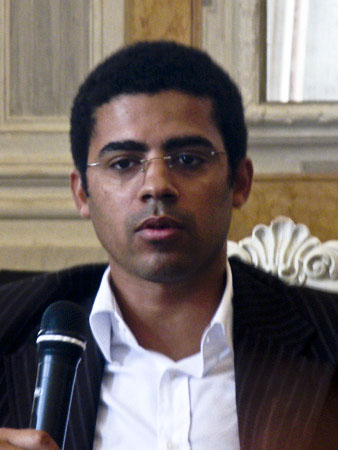
- Born: 16 March 1972; Kinshasa, Zaire (now Democratic Republic of the Congo)
- Died: 29 October 2020 (aged 48); Dubai, United Arab Emirates
- Resting place: Brompton Cemetery, London
- Education: Pierre and Marie Curie University
- Occupations: Art collector, businessman, Activist
- Spouse: Isabel dos Santos (m. 2002)
- Children: 3

Sindika Dokolo (16 March 1972 – 29 October 2020) was a Congolese businessman and art collector, married to Isabel dos Santos since 2002, the eldest daughter of José Eduardo dos Santos, then President of Angola. Dokolo owned one of the most important contemporary African art collections of more than 3,000 pieces. He died on 29 October 2020, in a free diving accident near Umm al-Hatab Island in Abu Dhabi, United Arab Emirates, at the age of 48.

== Early life ==
Sindika Dokolo was born in Kinshasa, capital of Zaire (now Democratic Republic of the Congo) in 1972 to Augustin Dokolo, a businessman, bank owner, millionaire, and collector of African arts, and his Danish wife Hanne Kruse. Dokolo was brought up in Belgium and France and graduated from the Lycée Saint-Louis-de-Gonzague in Paris. He studied economics, commerce and foreign languages at the Pierre and Marie Curie University and returned to Congo in 1995 to join his father´s businesses.

== Career ==
=== Business and corruption scandals ===
In 1995, Dokolo returned to Zaire to join the large family business of his father – in total 17 companies (banking, breeding, fishing, coffee exportation, real estate, consumer goods distributor, merchandise conveyance, printing, insurance, mining, and the selling of automobiles). In 1986, the Government of Zaire under President Mobutu Sese Seko had nationalized these family businesses.

A resident of Luanda since 1999, Dokolo was a businessman and the president of Sindika Dokolo Foundation. He was a member of the board of the Angolan cement company Nova Cimangola. As of 2013, he was a board member of Amorim Energia which owns a third of Portuguese petrol company Galp through the company Esperanza Holding BV.

Dokolo had invested in various sectors, including diamonds, oil, real estate, and telecommunications, in Angola, Portugal, Switzerland, the United Kingdom and Mozambique. In an interview with Jeune Afrique, he stated that his aim was not "to build a large integrated group", but rather to have the opportunity to see "Angola and the Democratic Republic of Congo as a complementary complement" – "a Luanda–Kinshasa axis that could create a counterweight to South African supremacy".

In January 2020, leaked documents indicated that Dokolo had made millions from a suspiciously one-sided partnership with the Angolan state diamond company, SODIAM, to buy a stake in Swiss luxury jeweller De Grisogono.

=== African art collection ===
Through his father's initiative, Dokolo started an arts collection at the age of 15. During an interview with Angolan television network TPA, he said his parents liked art to begin with: his mother took him to visit all the museums in Europe and his father was a great collector of classical African art.

Dokolo later started the Sindika Dokolo Foundation to promote numerous arts and culture festivals at home and abroad. Its mission is to create a display center for contemporary and other African art in Luanda, and also to create the conditions and activities which are necessary to integrate African artists in the international circles of the art world. Dokolo stated that his connection to the arts is not intended to be recognized as a great collector, but rather "to present African artists to the world". The Foundation follows the principle of freely lending its pieces to any international museum as long as that museum presents the same exhibition in an African country.

Dokolo started expositions like the SD Observatorio (July 2006 – August 2006) at the Valencia Institute of Modern Art, the Trienal de Luanda (December 2006 – March 2007), or the Check List Luanda Pop (June 2007 – November 2007) at the 52nd Venice Biennale. When the German collector Hans Bogatzke died, the curator Fernando Alvim suggested to Sindika Dokolo that he buy the 500 piece collection. The collection was secured for a low price because Hans Bogatzke's widow, despite loving her husband, did not want the responsibility and was pleased knowing it would be shown in Africa. On 25 January 2010, he organized a huge exposition for Luanda's 434th anniversary called Luanda Suave e Frenética, with many artists reflecting in various ways about a "vibrant and smooth" city.

In December 2013, Dokolo attended the opening of the VII Biennial of São Tomé and Príncipe, international art exhibition in the country, where the art works of Sindika Dokolo Foundation were presented. In an interview with Portuguese newspaper Jornal de Negócios, he talked about his collection, arguing that "the added value of contemporary African art scene is to give a sensible and intelligent perspective of a continent that is constantly on the move," aspects that will, in his opinion, project the African continent in the future. In October 2014, Dokolo took part in the 1:54 contemporary African art, held in London with the participation of many well-known personalities, including Lupita Nyong'o. A number of artists and celebrities, such as the model Alek Wek or singer Keziah Jones, publicly expressed their support and appreciation for his work, and the role of Sindika Dokolo Foundation in the development of contemporary African art. On the sidelines of this participation, Sindika Dokolo told New African about his projects for Angola and how "contemporary African art should be accessible to African and impact their lives."

In March 2015, the city of Porto awarded him the Medal of Merit with regard to the contemporary art exhibition You Love Me, You Love Me Not. saying it allowed the city of Porto to develop one of the most relevant projects within the contemporary art of today, helping to establish a "natural bridge" between the city and the world. It featured works from the art collector's collection and brings together fifty artists (not all Africans). As of 2015 this was the most important exhibition he had achieved, which was considered the largest existing African art collection.

In 2015, Dokolo launched a worldwide campaign to force Western museums, art dealers and auction houses to return Africa's art. "Works that used to be clearly in African museums must absolutely return to Africa" . He was dedicated to "recovering the stolen pieces during the colonial era", a mission accomplished with the help of an international team. In January 2016, the Foundation strengthened its ties with Portugal by choosing Porto to house its European headquarters. Located on Casa Manoel de Oliveira building, the new headquarters were to become a place to "promote artistic thinking networks and strengthen ties between Portugal and Angola, as well as Europe and Africa, celebrating art as an unifying element for people and nations," said Dokolo.

=== Political activism ===
On 10 August 2017 Dokolo founded the movement Les Congolais Debout, which opposed DRC President Joseph Kabila's continued stay in power beyond the two terms set down in the 2006 constitution.

== Personal life and death ==
In 2002, Dokolo married Isabel dos Santos, the eldest daughter of José Eduardo dos Santos, then President of Angola. As of 2020, he and his wife were under investigation for obtaining their wealth by corrupt means, allegations which they denied. On 29 October 2020, aged 48, with assets still frozen in Angola, Portugal and Netherlands, Dokolo died in a diving accident off the coast of Dubai. Although involved in controversy, the authorities concluded that there was no criminal suspicion behind the death after reviewing the forensic report and listening to statements of the deceased’s friends.
