= Kwanda Island =

Island off the coast of northwestern Angola

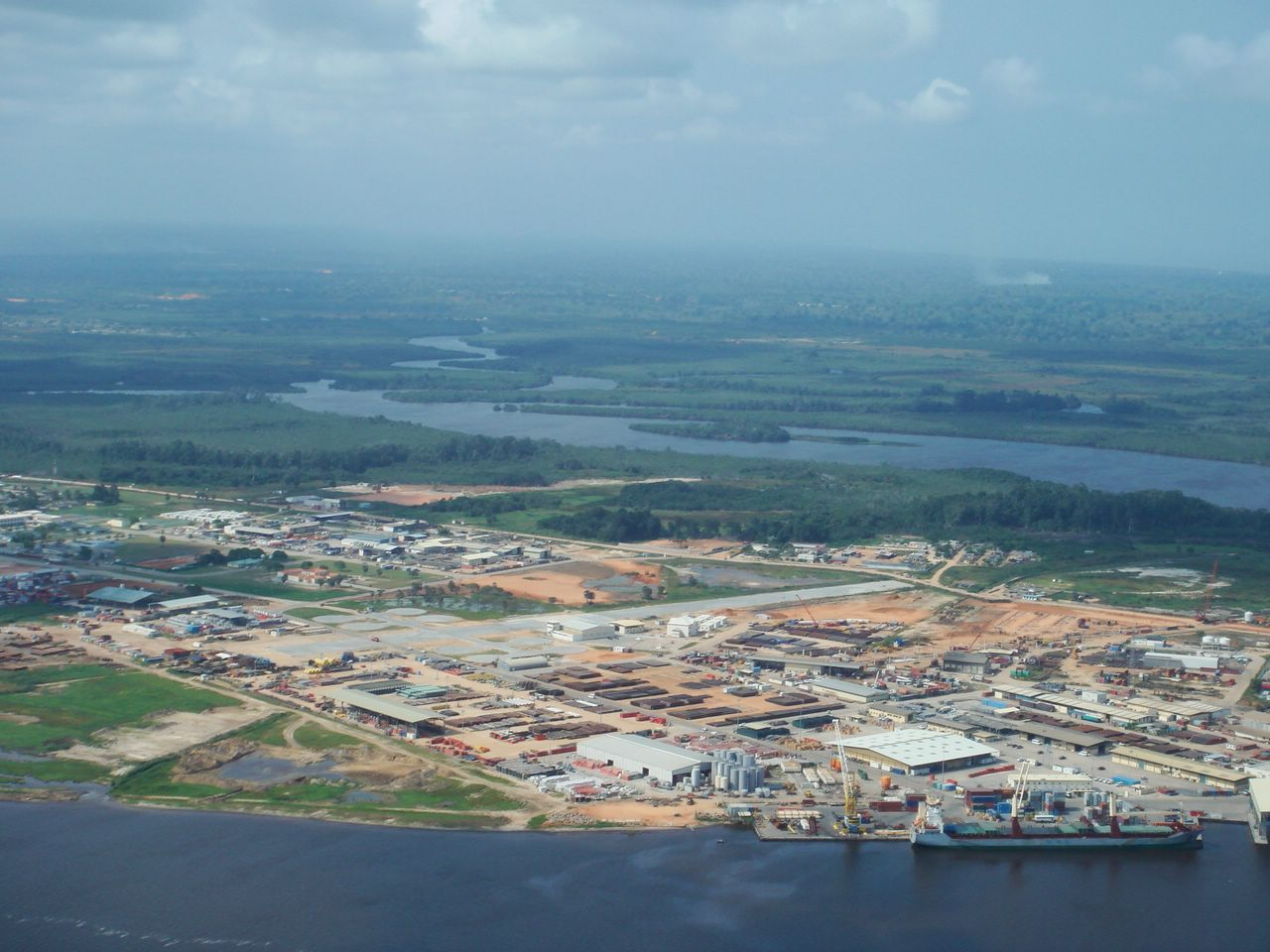
- Soyo Kwanda base

- Location within Angola

Geography
- Location: Congo River
- Coordinates: 6.119731°S 12.326145°E

Additional information
- Time zone: WAT (UTC+1:00)

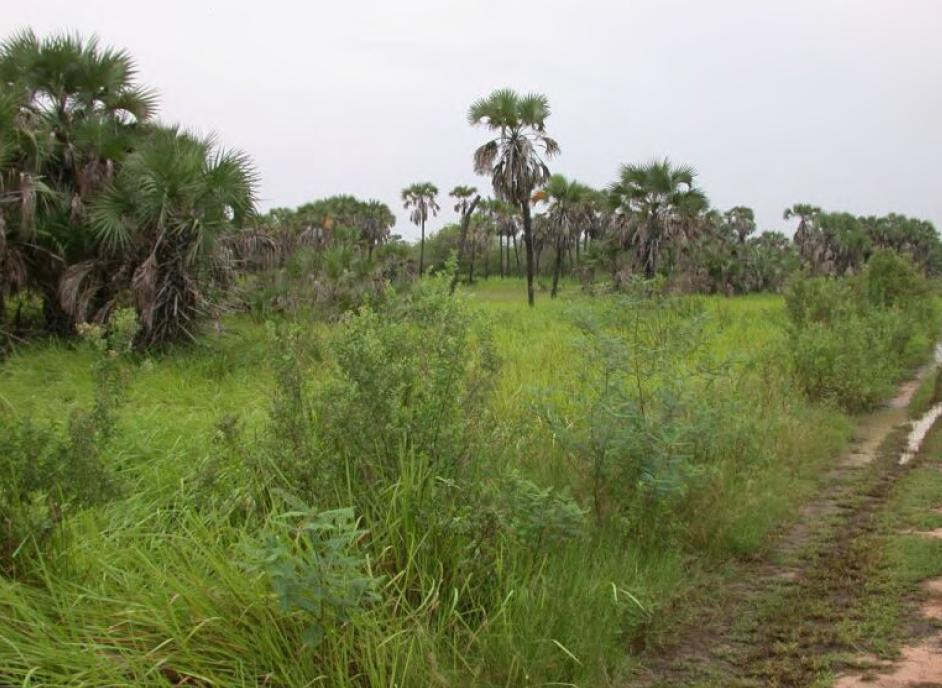
Palm savannah on Kwanda Island

Kwanda Island is an island located near Soyo, Angola, at the mouth of the Congo River.

The island's main purpose is to support oil and gas projects for the country of Angola. Several LNG projects have begun on the island.

Kwanda, Lda. is the operator of the Kwanda Base, which provides logistical support to the oil and gas companies for both offshore and onshore. Several oil and gas-related companies have facilities on the island, including Texaco, Petromar, Fina, BP, Sonangol, Halliburton, and Bechtel.
