= Belmiro de Azevedo =

Portuguese entrepreneur (1938 – 2017)

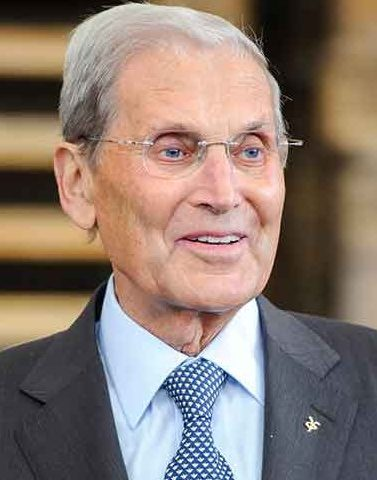
- Born: 17 February 1938; Tuias, Marco de Canaveses, Portugal
- Died: 29 November 2017 (aged 79); Porto, Portugal
- Education: University of Porto; Harvard University; Stanford University
- Spouse: Maria Margarida Carvalhais Teixeira
- Children: 3

Belmiro Mendes de Azevedo (17 February 1938 – 29 November 2017) was a Portuguese entrepreneur, ranked by Forbes as the 605th richest person in the world (2008), and 3rd richest in Portugal, with an estimated wealth of US$ 2 billion. He owned a controlling stake in Sonae SGPS, one of the largest business groups in Portugal, which also operates in Spain, Greece, Germany, Italy, Turkey and Brazil.

Sonae is a Portuguese leader in real estate and retailing and also has investments in telecommunications, tourism, venture capital, and the media. In 2006, Sonae launched an unsuccessful hostile bid to control Portugal Telecom (PT), the number one Portuguese telecommunications operator.

Azevedo, a carpenter and tailor's son from Marco de Canaveses, earned a degree in chemical engineering from the University of Porto and an MBA from Harvard University.

Azevedo's shares were acquired to the estate of late banker Afonso Pinto de Magalhães who, through his bank Banco Pinto de Magalhães, fully owned Sonae. Magalhães put Azevedo in charge of Sonae during the turbulent years following the 1974 Carnation Revolution that culminated in the seizure of the company by the Government. It was the success in keeping the company running during these years, plus the also successful reclaiming of the company ownership, that led the deceased banker's family to cede the control of Sonae to Azevedo, but not before a protracted legal battle between him and the banker's sons, whom Azevedo accused of incompetence and cockiness.

He was married to Maria Margarida Carvalhais Teixeira and had three children: Duarte Paulo Teixeira de Azevedo, born 31 December 1965 and married to Nicole Katharina Gerkrath, his father's successor in the company business, Maria Cláudia Teixeira de Azevedo and Nuno Miguel Teixeira de Azevedo, who also followed his father's footsteps in the family business.

He died in the CUF Hospital in Porto, on 29 November 2017.
