= Sonangol Group =

Angolan energy company

Sociedade Nacional de Combustíveis de Angola E.P.

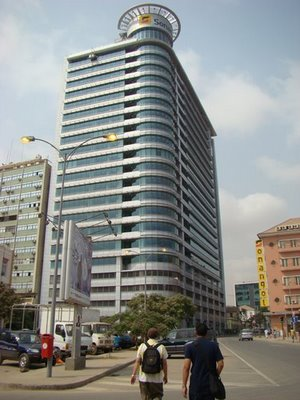
- Sonangol head office in Luanda
- Trade name: Sonangol
- Type: Statutory corporation
- Industry: Oil and gas industry
- Founded: 1976; 50 years ago
- Headquarters: Luanda, Angola
- Key people: Sebastião Gaspar Martins (chairman and CEO)
- Revenue: US$ 10.9 billion (2023)
- Owner: Government of Angola
- Number of employees: 13,000 (2022)
- Website: Sonangol.co.ao

Group Sonangol (Portuguese: Grupo Sonangol) is a parastatal that formerly oversaw petroleum and natural gas production in Angola. The group consisted of Sonangol E.P. (Portuguese: Sociedade Nacional de Combustíveis de Angola, E.P.) and its many subsidiaries. The subsidiaries generally had Sonangol E.P. as a primary client, along with other corporate, commercial, and individual clients. In 2023, Sonangol produced 202,000 barrels of oil with an income of US$ 10.9 billion.

== History ==
=== Foundation ===
On the eve of Portuguese Angola's independence from Portugal following the Carnation Revolution and the election of a democratic government in Portugal in 1976, the company ANGOL (ANGOL Sociedade de Lubrificantes e Combustíveis SARL), founded in 1953 as a subsidiary of Portuguese company SACOR) was nationalized and split in two, forming Sonangol U.E.E. and Direcção Nacional de Petróleos. Directive 52/76 instituted Sonangol as a state-owned company with a mandate to manage the country's substantial petroleum industry. Using the extant remains of Texaco, Total, Shell and Mobil's oil works, Sonangol obtained the assistance of Algerian Sonatrach and of Italian Eni.

=== Expansion ===
As the company grew it had a need to obtain services, such as telecommunications services, retail network support, trucking, shipping, data management, scientific, engineering, seismic, and others. The company created subsidiaries to meet these needs. Sonangol and its many subsidiaries have continued to expand into other lines of business.

In 1983, Sonangol opened its first international subsidiary, Sonangol Limited, in London.

In 1992, Sonangol P & P was founded as a prospection and production subsidiary.

In 1999, Sonangol U.E.E. became Sonangol E.P.

Oil giant Marathon Oil announced in September 2013 that it had agreed a deal in principle to sell a 10% stake in its offshore Angolan oilfield to Sonangol.

In December 2013, Sonangol acquired the exploration rights to five onshore oil blocks in Angola, which could be tendered for development at a later date.

=== Graft under the dos Santos family ===
==== Didier Keller bribery case ====
According to the judgement of a Swiss court in 2020, Didier Kelley paid key Sonangol officials a total of US$6.8 million in bribes between 2005 and 2008 while CEO of SBM Offshore. Kelley was fined over US$ half a million. At the time the bribery took place, the chairman of the board of directors of Sonangol was Manuel Vicente, who was also Vice President of Angola under President José Eduardo dos Santos. Though Vicente was not accused of accepting these bribes directly, in the opinion of the Swiss authorities, he would have been aware of them.

==== Dream's Leisure ====
Starting in 2006, Sonangol financed the construction of the Centro de Convenções de Talatona (CCTA), a convention center which was opened in December 2009 by President dos Santos. The CCTA included the five-star Hotel de Convenções de Talatona (HCTA), and in total cost Sonangol over US$200 million. Despite being the sole financier, Sonangol only held a 30% stake in the CCTA, which was majority held by Simaroco and also partially by Oil International Supply Services S.A. (OISS) and a Chinese investor. Simaroco was founded in 2005 by José Carlos de Castro Paiva, then chairman of Sonangol Limited and Sonangol's representative on the board of directors of the Banco Africano de Investimentos. OISS was owned in part by Alberto Cardoso Severino Pereira, Sonangol's former financial director, and lawyer Domingos de Assunção de Sousa de Lima Viegas, who was also employed by Sonangol and was Sonangol’s representative on the auditing committee of the BAI. In effect, this transferred millions of dollars' worth of assets held by a state entity into private hands.

A ten-year, a US$12 million contract for management of the HCTA was then awarded to Dream's Leisure, a company created thirteen days prior to the issuing of the contract, which was owned by Manuel Vicente, then chairman of the board of directors of Sonangol; Francisco Maria de Lemos, financial director of Sonangol; and Orlando Veloso, director of the engineering department. The terms of this contract stipulated that Sonangol would compensate Dream's Leisure for any net losses incurred through management of the hotel. Furthermore, the contract forbade Sonangol to transfer any third-party rights without approval from Dream's Leisure. In the opinion of Rui Verde, a lawyer and legal expert of anti-corruption watchdog Maka Angola, "the contract clearly encourages Dream's Leisure to inflate costs and declare losses, in order to plunder the State as much as possible."

==== Exem Energy and Sindika Dokolo ====
Ownership chart showing relationship between Sonangol, Dokolo, and Galp

In 2006, a company named Exem Energy BV acquired, in exchange for a US $11 million loan from Sonangol, a 6% stake in multibillion dollar Portuguese international energy company Galp Energia worth US$750 million through shares in holding companies Amorim Energia, which holds a 33.45% share in Galp, and Esperaza, which holds a 45% stake in Amorim. Exem Energy BV was controlled and 40% owned by Sindika Dokolo, who was the husband of President dos Santos's daughter Isabel dos Santos.

This move was later described in 2020 as "tainted by illegality" by a Dutch international arbitration tribunal in Amsterdam, "to reap an extraordinary financial gain to the detriment of Sonangol and, consequently, of the State of Angola," which froze Exem's assets, ruling in favor of a legal complaint by Sonangol that Exem owes them the shares back because of the corrupt way in which they were acquired.

==== Unaccounted-for billions ====
In December 2011, Human Rights Watch said that the government of Angola should explain the whereabouts of US$32 billion missing from government funds linked to Sonangol. A December 2011 report by the International Monetary Fund (IMF) said that the government funds were spent or transferred from 2007 through 2010 without being properly documented in the budget. The IMF was assured that most of $32 billion was being used for "legitimate government reasons" and considered to be "found".

==== Isabel dos Santos ====
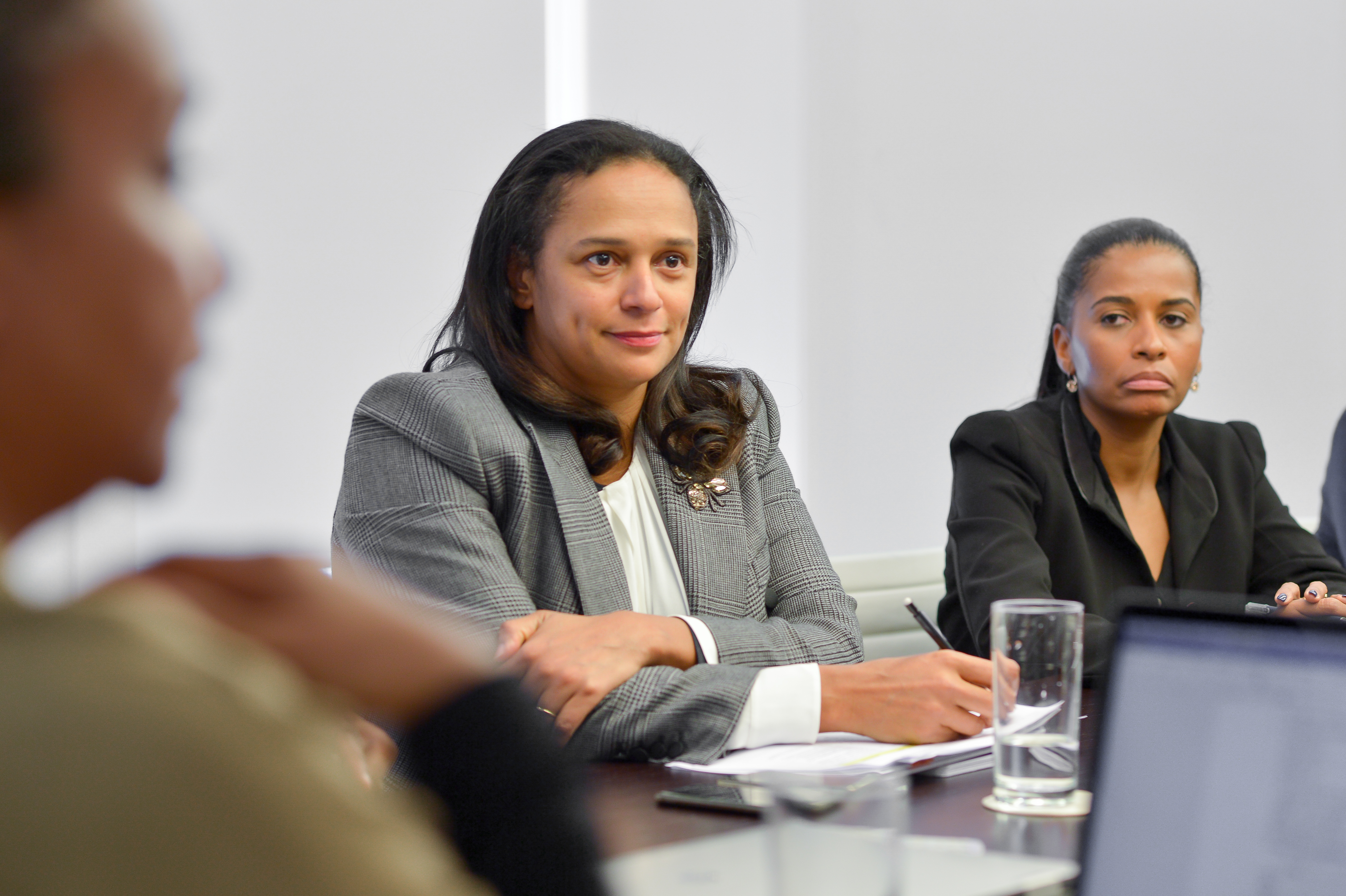
Isabel dos Santos (center) in a meeting

In June 2016, President dos Santos removed the entire board of Sonangol, and installed his daughter Isabel as chairwoman of the company, to "ensure transparency and apply global corporate-governance standards". This led to many accusations of corruption and nepotism. One year later, Maka Angola reported that Isabel dos Santos demanded, with threat, that the Ministry of Finance inject three billion US$ into the company, claiming it was necessary to rescue Sonangol from immediate bankruptcy, though this was not granted.

Isabel and her inner circle were paid salaries, described in one indictment as "exorbidant renumerations," that cost Sonangol over US$13 million in 14 months between 2016 and 2017, with her own monthly salary set at more than US$50,000.

In November 15, 2017, the new President of Angola, João Manuel Gonçalves Lourenço, dismissed both Isabel and the entire board of directors under her and named Carlos Saturnino Guerra Sousa e Oliveira as the Sonangol chairman. An internal audit later revealed that after she had been dismissed, Isabel had transferred US $38 million of the company's funds to the Dubai based company Ironsea (later renamed Matter), which was only created by herself and her friend, Mário Leite da Silva, earlier that year. In total, Ironsea/Matter charged Sonangol more than US$130 million.

Isabel fled to Dubai to avoid arrest in Angola, and in 2022 Interpol issued a red notice towards her. She is accused of crimes including abuse of power, abuse of trust, embezzlement, forgery of documents, influence peddling, money laundering, and tax fraud. She was convicted of embezzling €52.6 million from Sonangol in June 2023.

=== Privatization and streamlining ===
In February 2019, the Angolan government began its Propriv privatization program, and created the National Oil, Gas and Biofuel Agency (ANPG) to take over regulation and promotion of the Angolan petroleum industry from Sonangol. ANPG was given the power to supervise Sonangol, and became the new national concessionaire. In this regard, ANPG now controls who wins licenses to explore for petroleum, and awards contracts for production.

In May 2019, Carlos e Oliveira was sacked and replaced by Sebastião Gaspar Martins as head of the company.

In July 2019, President Lourenço canceled the Dream's Leisure contract, returning control of the Talatona hotel to the state.

In April 2020, the Ministry of Finance began conducting a pruning of Sonangol's other functions, including a selling of its peripheral businesses such as its ventures in aviation, banking, hotels, and real estate, many of which were built during the regime of the dos Santos family. Sonangol will refocus on its core business: the petroleum industry. Finally, Sonangol itself is to undergo a partial privatization, making 30% of shares of itself available for purchase by 2027. These reforms are aimed at transforming Sonangol from being both regulating body and oil producer into a corporate entity overseen by a separate state entity, though it will remain majority state owned.

== Organization ==
The Sonangol Group is vast and complex, described as "an economic octopus". It operates in offices around the world, and owns, owned, or shared dozens of subsidiaries and joint venture companies upstream, midstream, downstream, and outside of the petroleum industry, not only in Africa, but in North America, Latin America, Europe, and Asia as well. As of 2024, the company is currently in the process of divesting of many of its non-core assets.

=== Main headquarters ===
Sonangol's main corporate headquarters are in the Sonangol Building located on Rua Rainha Ginga, No 29-31 in the commercial Baixo neighborhood of the Ingombota district in Luanda. The Sonangol Building was built in 2005, designed by Chinese architect Sung-ho Hang. 2,000 people are employed in the building.

=== Trading offices ===
==== Sonangol Asia Limited ====
Sonangol Asia Limited (Sonasia) is a subsidiary trading company headquartered in Singapore which has been in operation since 2005. Its head offices are located in the Centennial Tower in Singapore's Downtown Core.

==== Sonangol Limited ====
Sonangol Limited is Sonangol's European trading subsidiary in the United Kingdom. Its 9,000 square foot head office is located on Brompton Road in the Knightsbridge district of London.

==== Sonangol USA ====
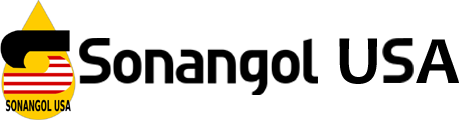
Sonangol USA logo

Sonangol USA, or Sonusa, is Sonangol's trading company in the United States. since November 12, 1997. Its 40,000 square foot headquarters are on Enclave Parkway in the Energy Corridor of Houston, Texas.

=== Holding companies ===
- China Sonangol International Holding Limited, joint holding company in Hong Kong
- Empresa de Serviços e Sondagens de Angola (ESSA)
- Sonadrill Holding, 50/50 joint venture with Seadrill, controls Sonangol-owned drillships Sonangol Quenguela and Sonangol Libongos, as well as Seadrill-owned West Gemini
- Sonangol Cabo Verde Sociedade e Investimentos
- Esperaza Holding BV holding company
  - Amorim Energia, holding company with shares in Galp

=== Upstream petroleum companies ===
==== Sonamer ====
Sonamer is an oil and natural gas well drilling company established in 1998 between Sonangol (49%) and Pride International (51%), specializing in deep and ultra-deep waters. It operates a fleet of drillships including the Pride Africa and Pride Angola. The company is registered to a post office box in Nassau, Bahamas.

==== Sonangol Hidrocarbonetos Brazil ====
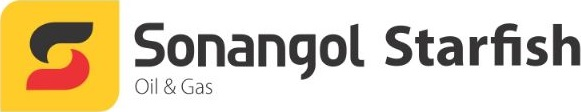
Sonangol Starfish logo

Sonangol Hidrocarbonetos Brazil Ltda, formerly Sonangol Starfish Oil & Gas SA, formed in 2010 after Sonangol purchased Starfish Oil and Gas. It produces and explores for oil in Brazil.

==== Sonangol P & P ====
Sonangol Pesquisa e Produção (Sonangol P&P) is an oil exploration and production arm of the Sonangol group. In addition to its activities in Angola, it also operates the Najmah and Qayara oil fields in Iraq through its subsidiary, Sonangol P & P Iraq.

=== Midstream petroleum companies ===
==== Kwanda Suporte Logístico ====
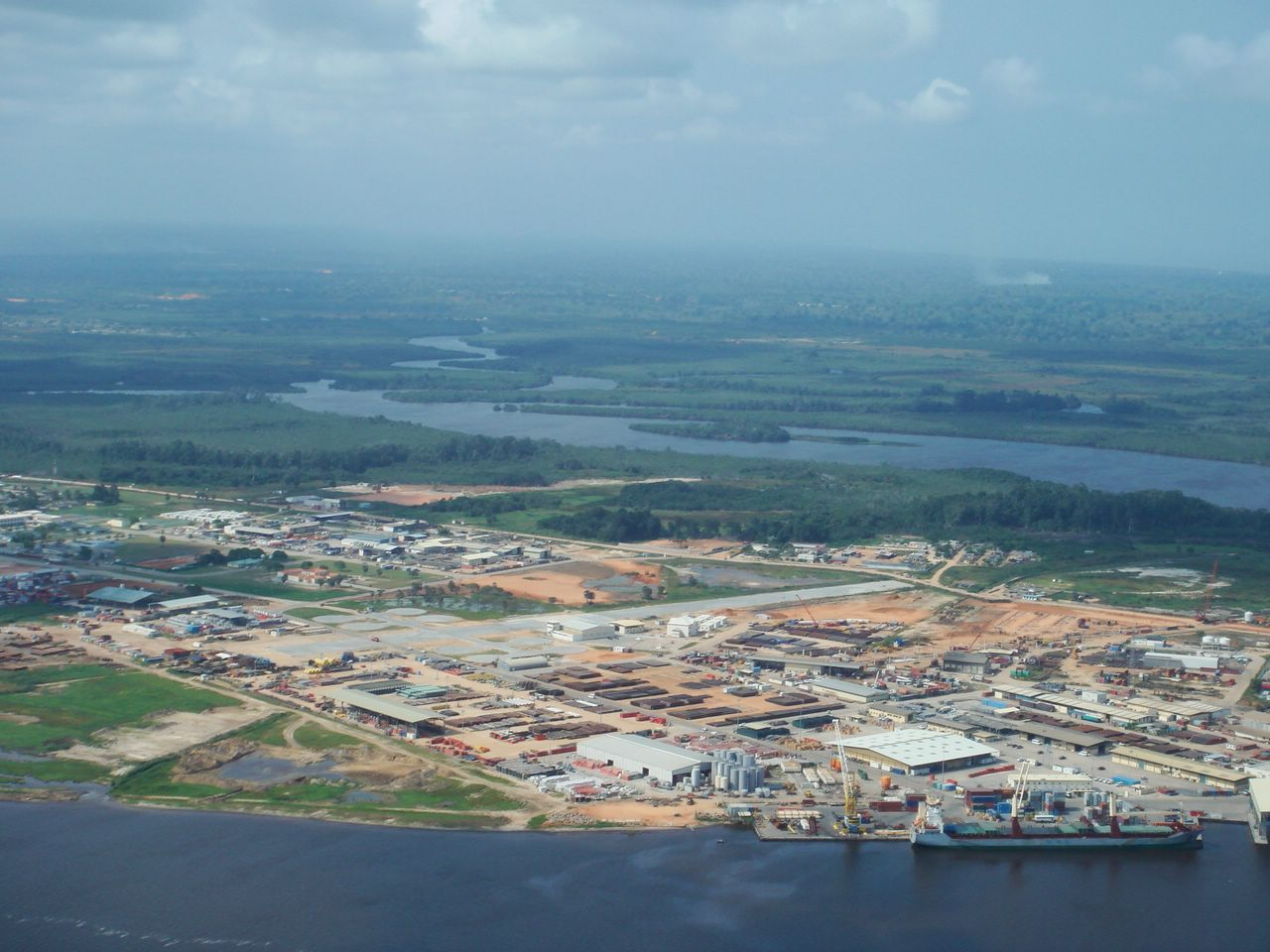
Kwanda Logistics Base on Kwanda Island in Soyo in 2007

Sonangol (through holding company subsidiary Sonangol Holdings) holds a 30% stake in the operating company of a logistics base for the petroleum industry on Kwanda Island in Soyo, alongside Italy's Saipem (49%) and fellow Angolan companies Casoy (11%) and Sangemental (10%).

The base is located strategically to provide services both to the Port of Soyo and to nearby oil blocks. The facilities at the base include three quays for oil and gas ships to dock, with storage, catering, housing, and medical services on shore. Kwanda has over 700 employees.

==== OPS ====
OPS Servicos de Producao de Petroleos Ltd is a joint venture between Sonangol and SBM Offshore that operates and manages a fleet of five FPSOs owned by Sonasing: Kuito, Mondo, Sanha, and Saxi Batuque, as well as N’Goma, which was previously named Xikomba prior to a major refit.

==== SONILS ====
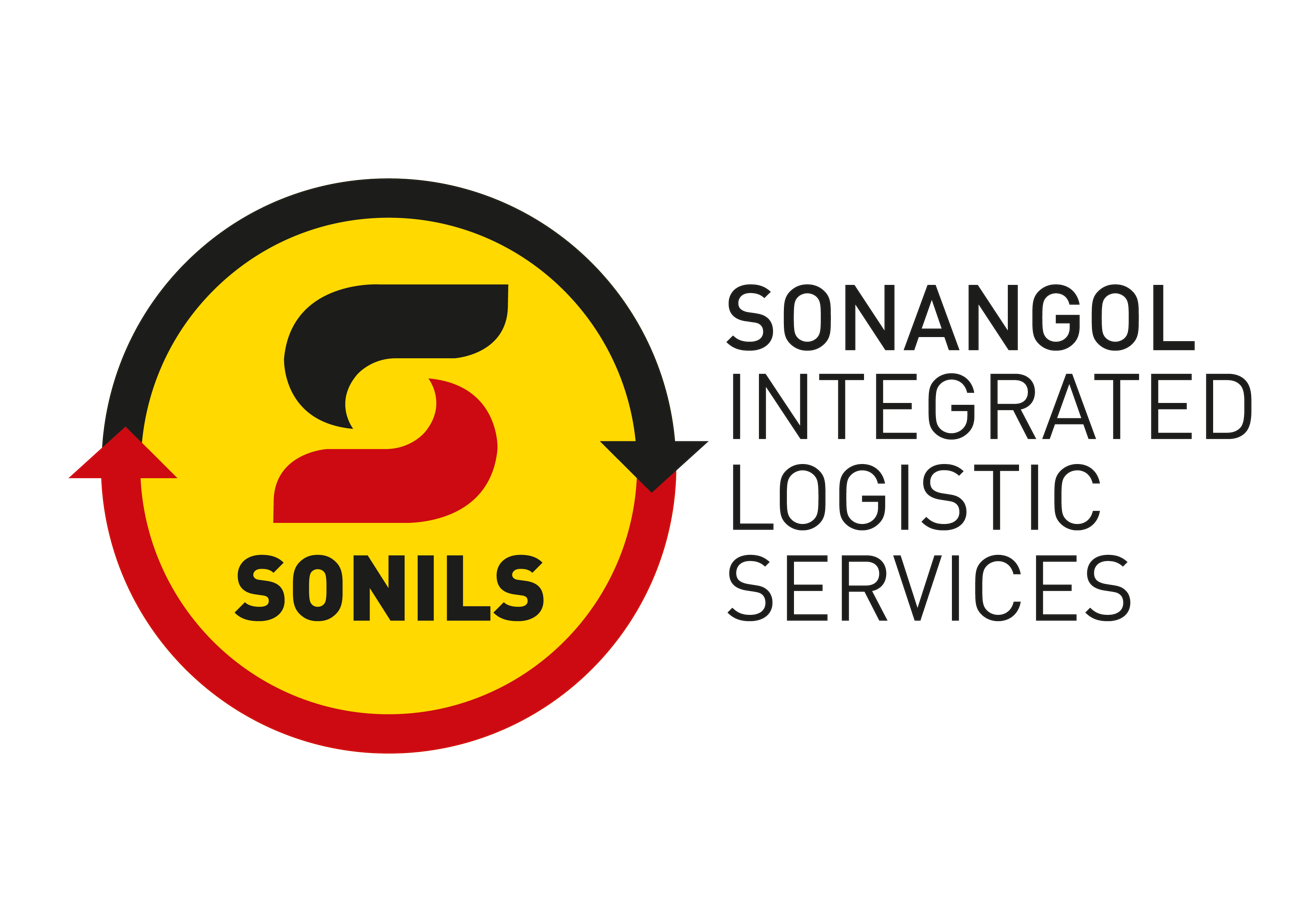
SONILS logo

Sonangol Integrated Logistics Services operates a two-million square meter petroleum industry onshore supply base in Luanda Bay with a 2 kilometer long quay, equipment rentals, cargo facilities, warehouses, medical facilities, and other support services for ships. Over 3,000 people work at the Luanda facility, over half of whom are Angolan nationals. 65% of Angola's oil goes through SONILS.

The SONILS base was designed in 1993, inaugurated in 1995, and expanded in 1998, 2004, and 2008, then given a new dock extension in 2012.

==== Sonangol Logística ====
Sonangol Logística is a liquid fuel storage subsidiary of Sonangol. In 2020, Sonangol Logística possessed 358,511 cubic meters of total fuel storage, representing over half the country's total capacity.

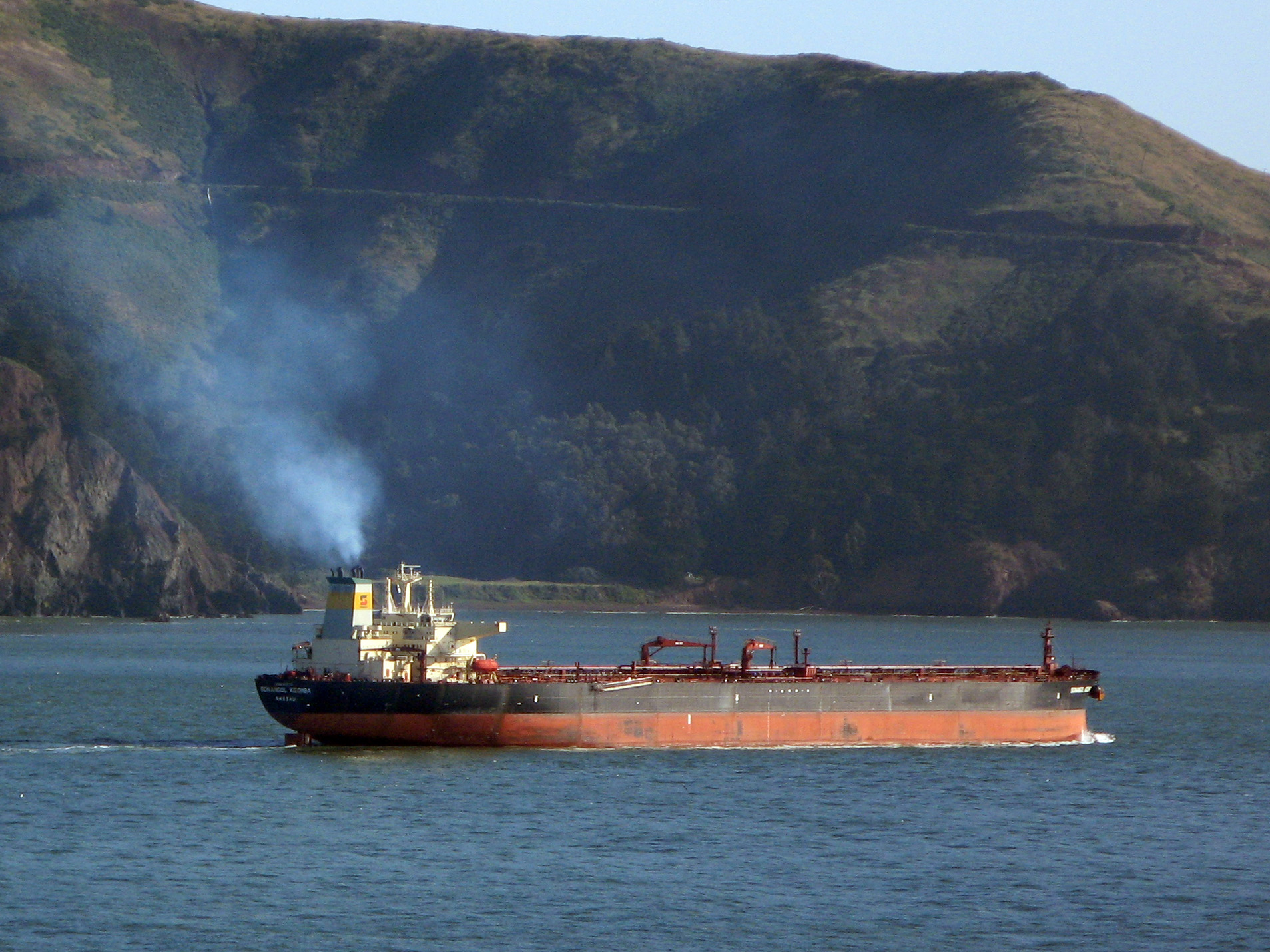
Oil tanker Sonangol Kizomba, one of the vessels owned through Sonangol Shipping

==== Sonangol Shipping ====
Sonangol Shipping Holdings Limited and its subsidiary, Sonangol Shipping Angola, own a fleet of tankers bearing the Sonangol name, which transport both crude and refined oil to destinations worldwide. The company is registered in Nissau, Bahamas, though the subsidiaries running the individual ships are all registered in Malta.

==== Sonasing ====
Sonasing was founded in 1999 as a 50-50 joint venture between Sonangol and SBM Production. Its mission is to acquire FPSOs and FSOs for use by the Angolan oil industry. Sonasing owns the ships OPS manages and operates.

=== Downstream petroleum and power companies ===
==== ENACOL ====
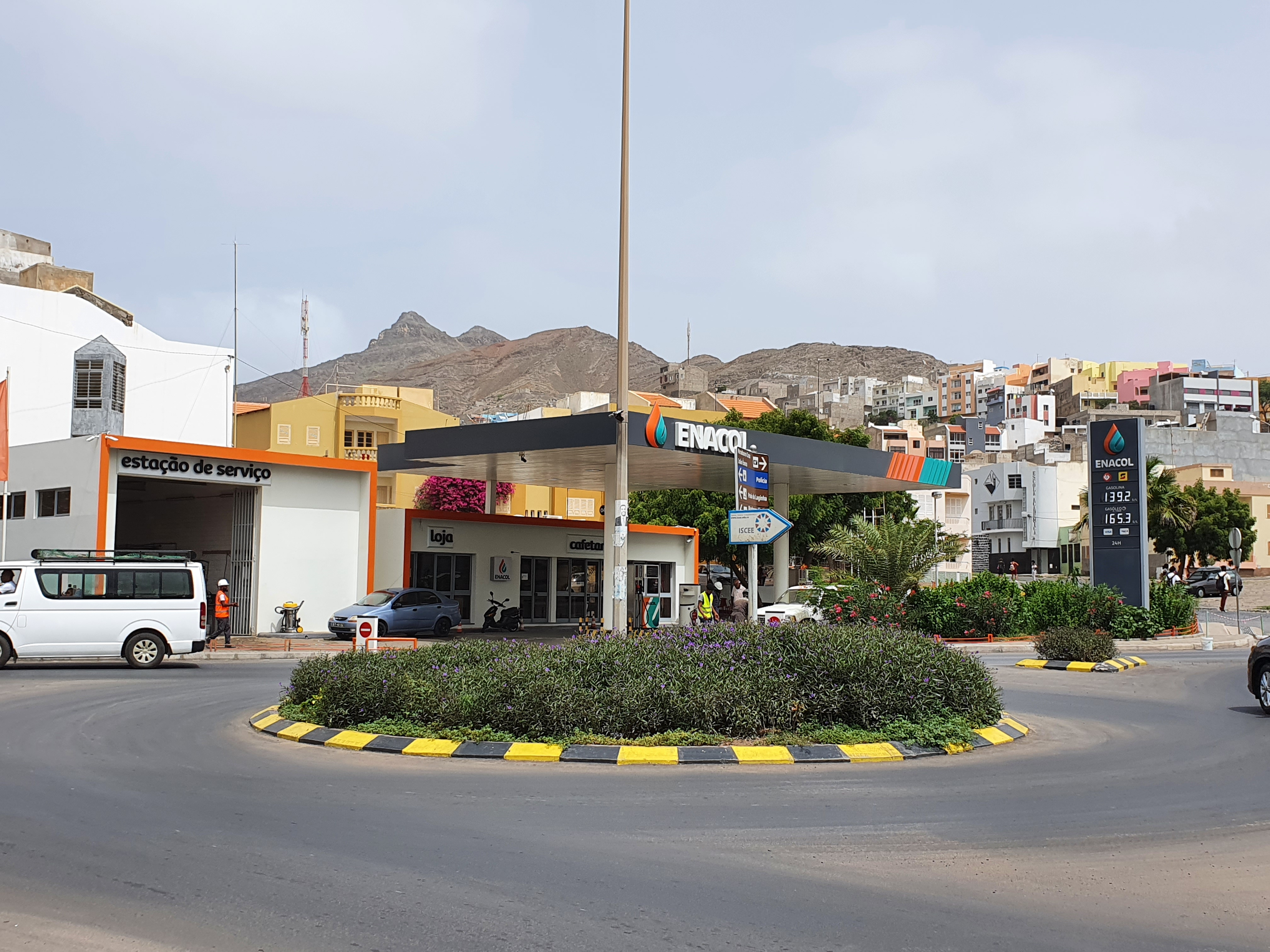
An ENACOL gas station in Mindelo, Cape Verde

Empresa Nacional de Combustíveis, SARL (ENACOL) is owned by Sonangal (32.5%), Petrogal (32.5%), the government of Cape Verde (29.3%), and other minor partners. It markets, stores, and distributes petrochemicals in Cape Verde. It is headquartered in Mindelo, São Vicente.

==== ENCO ====
Empresa Nacional de Combustíveis e Óleos, SARL (ENCO) is the national fuel and gas company of São Tomé and Príncipe. Sonangol owns a majority stake of the company and, through its subsidiary SonaGás, is its primary supplier of fuel and its sole supplier of butane and liquefied natural gas.

==== Pumangol ====
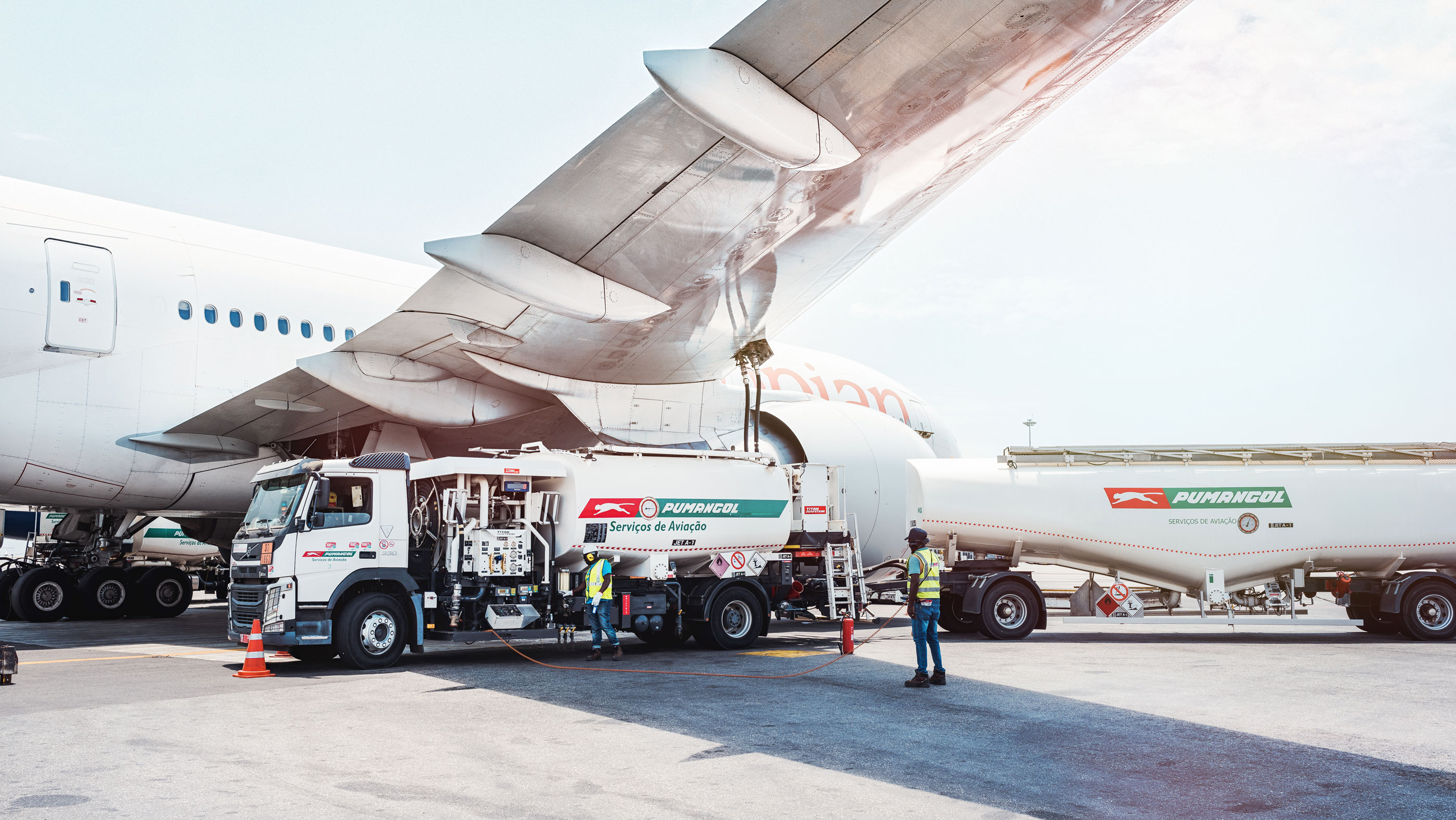
A Pumangol aircraft refueling truck

Pumangol is a network of gas stations and airport and marine fuel terminals formerly belonging to Swiss oil company Puma Energy. Sonangol acquired Pumangol and other assets in April 2021 when it sold its stake in Puma Energy to Trafigura in April 2021 for US$600 million, then purchased Puma's assets in Angola, including Pumangol, for the same amount. Pumangol owns 81 fuel stations, fuel terminals in four airports, and the Terminal de Combustíveis da Pumangol em Luanda (TCPL) in Luanda Bay, with its 81st fuel station opened on January 27, 2024 in Luanda. Ivanilson Machando is CEO.

==== Quilemba Solar Company ====
In 2021, Sonangol joined forces with French company Total Eren (a Total Energy subsidiary) and Angolan company Greentech-Angola Environment Technology to begin building a photovoltaic power plant in Lubango, with Sonangol possessing a 30% stake and Total Eren with a 51% majority.

==== Sonangalp ====
Sonangalp logo

Sonangalp Limitada is a fuel and lubricant distribution company formed in 1994 in partnership with Petrogal. It is one of the three main subsidiary companies through which Galp Energia operates in Angola. Sonangalp owns 54 filling stations in Angola.

Sonangol owns a 30% stake which is slated for divestment.

==== Sonangol Distribuidora ====
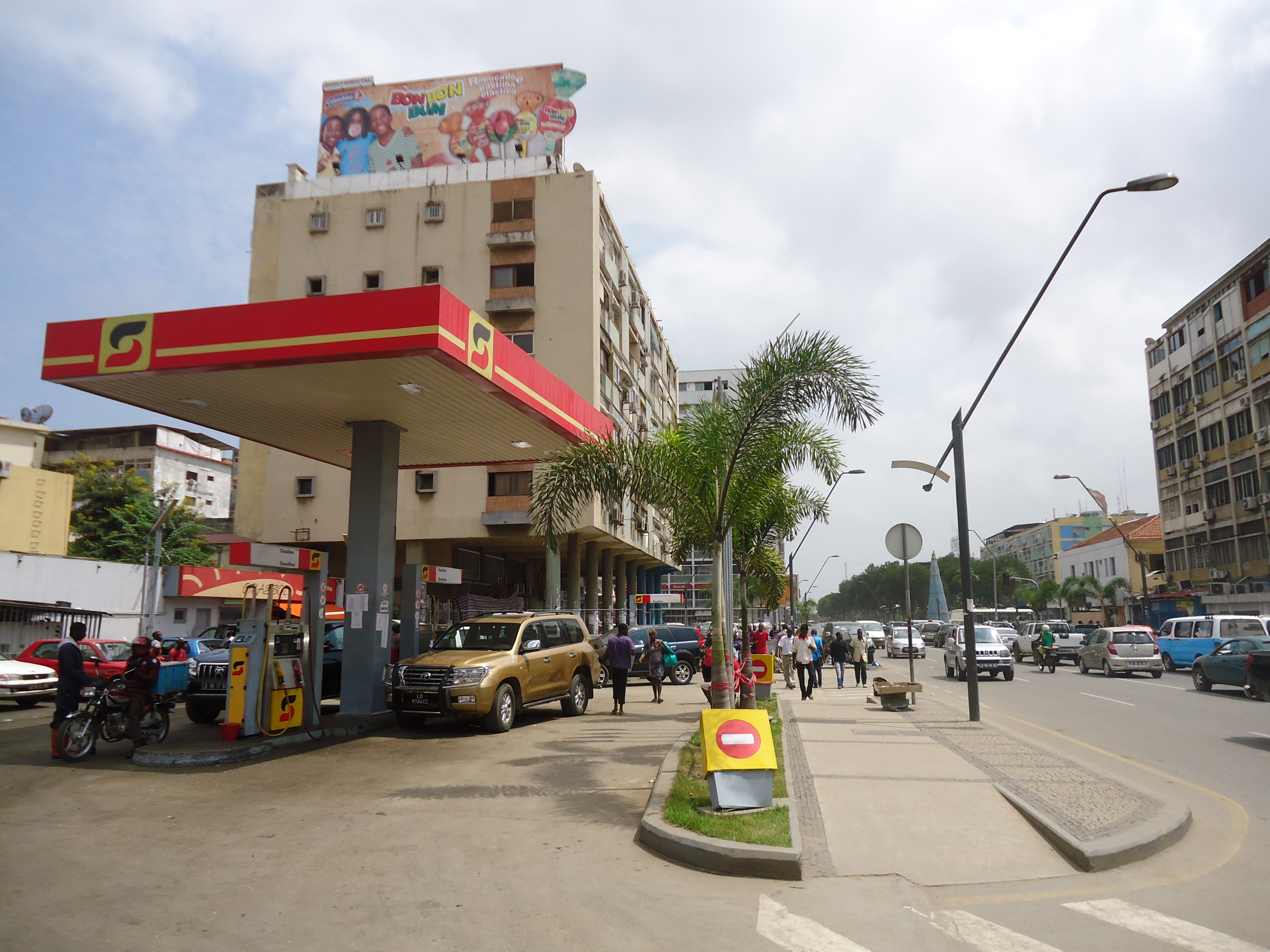
A Sonangol gasoline station on Don João II Ave in Luanda, likely operated by Sonangol Distribuidora.

Sonangol Distribuidora is a downstream petroleum product distribution subsidiary of Sonangol. It operates numerous retail gasoline stations. In 2018, Sonangol Distribuidora employed 910 workers.

In 2021, an unnamed former Sonangol Distribuidora CEO was charged with taking bribes from Trafigura and its CEO Mike Wainwright during the dos Santos presidency, gaining the latter profits of profits of US$143.7 million between 2009 and 2011.

=== Integrated petroleum companies ===
==== SonaGás ====
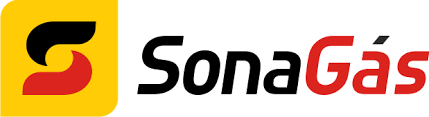
SonaGás logo

Sonangol Gás Natural (SonaGás) develops and distributes natural gas. SonaGás has a 22.8% stake in Angola LNG, a major liquefied natural gas (LNG) plant near Soyo, along with its partners Cabinda Gulf Oil Company (a subsidiary of Chevron), BP, Eni, and Total.

In 2017, SonaGás became the exclusive supplier of butane and liquid natural gas to ENCO, the national gas company of São Tomé and Príncipe.

In July 2024, Afreximbank announced plans to open a fertilizer factory called AMUFERT in Soyo, with SonaGás owning a 10% stake and responsibilities for supply of gas to the factory.

==== Sonangol-Congo ====
In 1998, Sonangol incorporated a subsidiary in Kinshasa in the Democratic Republic of the Congo as a 60-40 joint venture with Zimbabwean company COMIEX, with the Congolese Minister of State, Pierre-Victor Mpoyo, as its first CEO. Sonangol later increased its stake to 75%. Sonangol Congo focuses on the importing, marketing, storage, transportation of refined oil products in the DRC. It is Angola's largest commercial enterprise in the DRC.

=== Construction, engineering, and shipyards ===
==== Angoflex ====
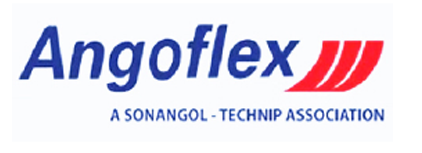
Angoflex logo

Established in 2002 as a joint venture between Sonangol (30%) and Technip Angola (70%), Angoflex is a manufacturer of submarine umbilicals and pipelines for the oil industry, with over 24 projects completed for clients such as BP, Chevron, Eni, ExxonMobil, and Total. In 2019, Angoflex celebrated its 500th kilometer of umbilicals produced.

==== PAENAL ====
Porto Amboim Estaleiros Navais (PAENAL) was founded in 2008 as a joint venture between Sonangol and partner SBM Offshore, with Daewoo Shipbuilding & Marine Engineering joining in 2010. PAENAL operates a shipyard in Porto Amboim that specializes in the construction and servicing of FPSO ships, and is the only shipyard in Angola with the capacity to do so. The yard employs 1,000 people and can fabricate up to 10,000 tons of modules per year. It is equipped with a 490 meter quay and Jamba, the largest heavy lifting crane in Africa with a 2,500 ton capacity. The first African-built FPSO, CLOV, was built in PAENAL and launched in 2014. Sonangol owns a 10% share of PAENAL which is planned for divestment in accordance with Propriv.

==== Petromar ====
Petromar logo

Petromar builds, installs, and designs offshore facilities like oil platforms, cranes, and deep water equipment. The company was created by the Angolan government on October 6, 1984, as a result of Decree 23/84. It has a fabrication yard in Soyo.

In 2020, as part of Propriv, Sonangol made its 30% stake in Petromar available for bidding.

==== Sonacergy ====
Sonacergy Serviços e Construções Petrolíferas, Lda is a company that performs drilling, inspection, maintenance, assistance, and research of oil facilities. As part of Propriv, Sonangol is as of 2020 looking to divest its 40% stake of Sonacergy.

==== Sonamet ====
Sonamet Industrial S.A. manufactures oil platforms and other large metal structures from its production facilities in Lobito Bay. It was founded as a joint venture between Sonangol and ETPM, which is now Subsea 7. As part of Propriv, Sonangol is as of 2020 looking to divest its 40% stake in Sonamet.

==== Technip Angola ====
Established in 1999 as a joint venture between Sonangol and Technip, Technip Angola provides engineering services to the oil industry, including those of its subsidiary, Angoflex.

=== Freight, logistics, and shipping ===
- Manubito Lda shipping agency
- SonAir oil and gas industry air transport service
- Sonafurt International Shipping

=== Real estate and finance ===
- AAA Financial Services Ltd
- Banco Angolano de Investimentos Cabo Verde (BAICV)
- Banco Angolano de Investimentos, S.A. relaunched as Banco Económico in 2014
- Dirani Project
- Puaça
- Sociedade de Desenvolvimento Imobiliário (SODIMO) real estate management
- Solo Properties Nightbridge, Ltd. through China Sonangol

=== Technology and telecommunications ===
- Mercury Services and Telecommunications, S.A.R.L. (MSTelcom) telecommunications
  - Angola e Comunicações e Sistemas, Limitada
- Sonawest seismic data service

=== Tourism and hospitality ===
- Centro de Convenções de Talatona (CCTA) convention center
- Hotel da Base do Kwanda
- Hotel de Convenções de Talatona (HCTA) five-star hotel
- Hotel Florença three-star hotel in Luanda
- Hotel Rio Mar hotel in Benguela
- Hotel Suíte Maianga hotel in Luanda

=== Other ===
- Atlético Petróleos de Luanda

== Former assets ==
=== Energy and petroleum ===
==== Societé Ivorienne de Raffinage (until 2024) ====
Sonangol held a 20% stake in the Société Ivoirienne de Raffinage oil refining company of Cote d'Ivoire until its sale of those shares in June 2024.

==== Sonadiets (until 2022) ====
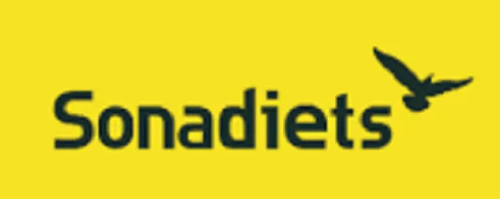
Sonadiets logo

Sonadiets Limitada and Sonadiets Services Limitada are Luanda-based joint ventures between Sonangol and international energy firm Dietsmann. They provides operational and maintenance support for the petrochemical industry, as well as workforce training. Their clients include Sonangol subsidiaries as well as Total, ExxonMobil, and Eni.

Sonangol sold its 30% stake in Sonadiets Limitada and 51% in Sonadiets Services in 2022.

==== Sonasurf (until 2022) ====
Sonasurf operates ships for the oil industry since its founding in 1999 as a joint venture between Sonangol and Surf S.A. Sonangol held a 50% stake in Sonasurf Angola and 49% in Sonasurf International until selling both in 2022 under Propriv.

==== Sonatide (until 2022) ====
Sonatide Marine Angola Lda provides ships and ship management services to the oil industry. It was established as a joint venture between Sonangol and Tidewater Marine, a Cayman Islands based company, with an investment of US$1.3 million in 2018, with Sonangol holding a 51% stake in the company and Tidewater Marine holding the rest. Sonangol divested its stake in Sonatide in 2022.

==== Sopor (until 2014) ====
Sociedade Distribuidora de Combustíveis, S.A. (Sopor) was a Portuguese fuel and refined petrochemical distributor established in 1957 and based in Lisbon, owned by Sonangol (49%) and Petrogal (51%). Sopor was dissolved on 30 December 2014.

=== Real estate and finance ===
- Dirani Project

=== Hospitality and tourism ===
- Atlântida Viagens e Turismo, tourism agency
- Miramar Empreendimentos owning company of Hotel Intercontinental Luanda Miramar
- WTA Internacional S.A. travel agency
