= Santoro Finance =

Angolan holding company

- Headquarters: Angola

Santoro Finance is an Angolan company based in Lisbon, Portugal. Santoro is a holding company and was founded by investor Isabel dos Santos, the largest shareholder and oldest daughter of the President of Angola, José Eduardo dos Santos. The actual President of Santoro Finance is Mario Moreira Leite da Silva; the main office is on Avenida da Liberdade in the Portuguese capital.

Santoro started its financial activities on December 22, 2008. The company provides consulting services for business and management. Santoro has held a 19.4% stake in BPI since 2012.
