= Paulo de Azevedo =

Portuguese businessman (born 1965)

Duarte Paulo Teixeira de Azevedo (Porto, 31 December 1965) is since 2000 chairman of Sonaecom, son and successor of the founder of the business empire Sonae, Belmiro de Azevedo, former chairman of the Board of Directors of the company. Paulo de Azevedo in 2007 assumed the leadership of the Sonae Group, succeeding his father.

== Early life and education ==
De Azevedo completed his secondary education at Malvern College in England and later a degree in chemical engineering, like his father, at the Ecole Polytechnique Federale de Lausanne, in Lausanne, Switzerland. He later received a Master's degree in management and administration at the University of Porto and postgraduate training programs for executives.

== Career ==
In 2000, de Azevedo founded Portugal's third mobile operator, Optimus, starting to manage his own projects.

He is currently Sonaecom chief executive with functions in the parent company Sonae SGPS and non-executive director in Sonae Industria. Sonae is one of the largest business groups in Portugal, which also operates in Spain, Greece, Germany, Italy, Turkey, Brazil and Angola.

== Other activities ==
- European Round Table of Industrialists (ERT), Member
- Allianz, Member of the International Advisory Board (since 2013)

== Personal life ==
De Azevedo is married to Nicole Katharina Gerkrath de Azevedo and has three children.
