= Angola LNG =

LNG plant in Angola

Angola LNG Limited
- Type: Joint venture
- Industry: Natural gas
- Founded: 2008
- Headquarters: Soyo, Angola
- Area served: Worldwide
- Products: LNG, propane, butane, condensate
- Services: LNG production and export; gas supply to domestic market
- Owners: Sonangol; Chevron; TotalEnergies; Azule Energy
- Website: www.angolalng.com

Angola LNG is a liquefied natural gas (LNG) plant and joint venture company based in Soyo, Zaire Province, Angola. It is the country's first LNG export facility and one of its largest energy investments, built as a single-train liquefaction plant with a capacity of about 5.2 million tonnes per year of LNG and an estimated capital cost of around US$12 billion.

The project is owned and operated by Angola LNG Limited, a partnership between Sonangol, Chevron, TotalEnergies and Azule Energy, and was developed to monetise offshore associated gas, reduce gas flaring and supply both export markets and domestic consumers.

== Technical features ==
The Angola LNG plant is a single train facility with production capacity of 5.2 million tonnes per year. The plant uses ConocoPhillips' proprietary natural gas liquefaction technology (Optimized CascadeSM Process). In addition to LNG, it also produces propane, butane and natural-gas condensate.

The plant is supplied from offshore gas fields on blocks 14, 15, 17 and 18, and from non-associated gas fields Quiluma, Atum, Polvo and Enguia. It was built to reduce gas flaring and associated pollution by collecting waste gas from Angola's offshore oil fields, and to allow the operators of the offshore oil fields to use what would otherwise be wasted.

The plant was constructed by Bechtel. It cost US$12 billion and was commissioned in 2013. The first LNG was shipped on 16 June 2013, delayed from the initial 2012 target.

In addition to LNG exports, the project supplies pipeline gas and butane to the Angolan market and is a major supplier to the Soyo combined-cycle power plant. By June 2023 Angola LNG had shipped its 400th LNG cargo, with cargoes delivered to more than 30 countries worldwide, including India as a key market and growing volumes to Europe.

== Company ==
The Angola LNG project was developed by Texaco and the state oil company Sonangol as a way to capture associated gas from offshore oil production and reduce routine flaring. Angola LNG Limited was formed in 2008 as a joint venture between Cabinda Gulf Oil Company (a subsidiary of Chevron), Sonangol, BP, Eni and Total, with stakes of 36.4%, 22.8% and 13.6% each respectively.

In 2022, BP and Eni combined their Angolan oil, gas and LNG interests in the 50:50 joint venture Azule Energy, which holds their combined participation in the Angola LNG joint venture. Angola LNG’s current partnership therefore consists of Sonangol, Chevron, TotalEnergies and Azule Energy.

== Challenges ==
The plant was initially expected to begin LNG exports in early 2012, but commissioning was delayed and the first cargo was shipped in June 2013, about 18 months later than planned. Capital costs rose well above early estimates of US$4–5 billion, with later assessments putting total project costs at around US$12 billion.

In April 2014 a major incident involving hydrocarbon releases led to a full shutdown of the plant and a programme of repairs and reconstruction to address design flaws and corrosion of equipment. The facility remained offline for an extended period and resumed production in 2016.

== See also ==
- African LNG terminals
- Energy in Angola
- Corruption in Angola
- Economy of Angola
