= Continente =

Portuguese hypermarket chain

- Company type: Subsidiary
- Industry: Retail
- Founded: Matosinhos, Portugal (1985)
- Founder: João Rui Rego
- Headquarters: Matosinhos, Portugal
- Number of locations: 519 stores (2018)
- Products: Grocery; General merchandise Financial services
- Revenue: ▲€3.275 million (2010)
- Operating income: ▲€147 million (2010)
- Number of employees: 28,150 (2010)
- Parent: Sonae
- Website: www.continente.pt

Continente is a retail chain that belongs to Sonae Distribuição, the largest retailer in Portugal. The hypermarket Continente chain is spread all over continental Portugal as well as on Madeira and in the Azores. The supermarket chain Continente Modelo, formerly named just Modelo, also has a nationwide presence. Sonae Distribuição, SGPS, SA, is a subsidiary company of Sonae SGPS.

== History ==
Sonae Distribuição started in 1985 by the merger of two large retailers, Modelo and Continente. Modelo was owned by the Sonae holding, while Continente was the Portuguese and Spanish operation of the French retailer Promodès, known by the ensign Continent elsewhere.

Thus, it was part-owned by its French competitor, Carrefour, who sold their stake to Sonae for €345 million on 16 November 2004.

In 2008, Carrefour sold its Portuguese retail ventures existing under the Carrefour ensign to Sonae. Continente used to have one branch in Dubai, which was later purchased by Carrefour. The Continente ensign disappeared from Spain after the 1999 Carrefour-Promodès merge.

== Store formats ==
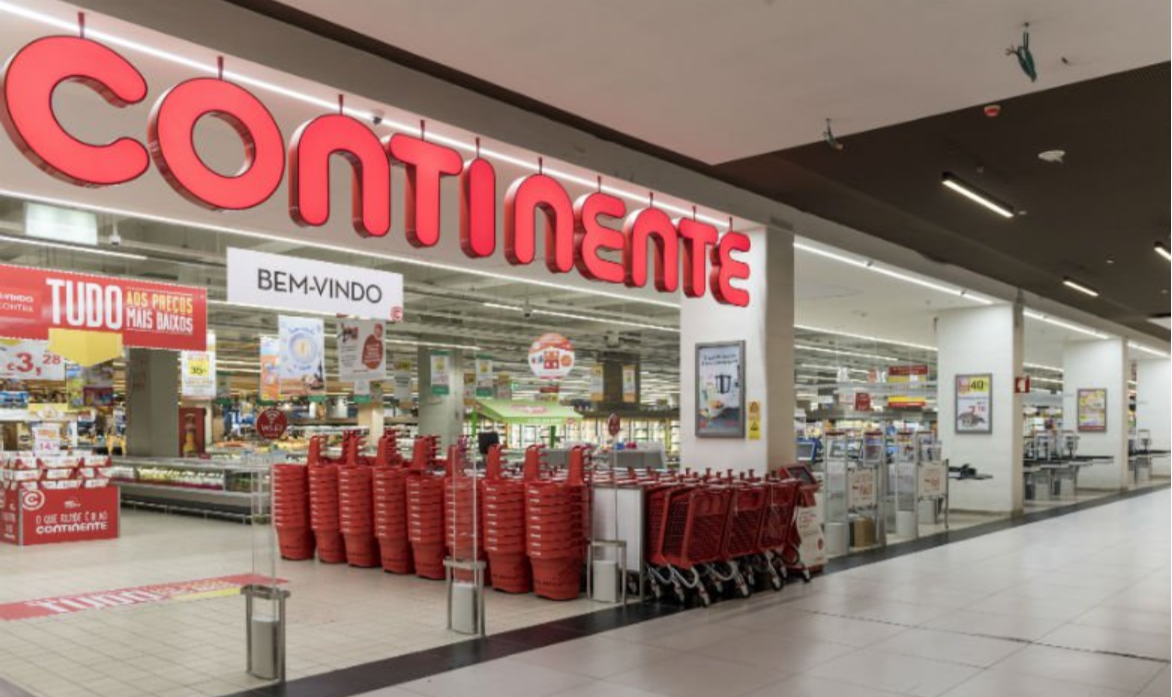
Continente supermarket at Colombo Shopping Center, Lisbon.

The supermarket chain operates three main store formats; regular Continente stores, Continente Bom Dia (convenience stores and smaller supermarkets in urban locations, designed for more frequent purchases of everyday life, 800 m^{2} (8,600 sq ft)) and Continente Modelo stores (hypermarkets of proximity, with an area of about 2,000 m^{2} (22,000 sq ft)).

At the end of its 2009/10 financial year Continente store portfolio was as follows.

Format	Number	Total Space (m^{2})
Continente	53	
Continente Modelo	137	
Continente Bom Dia	147	
Wells	133	
BAGGA	87	
Book.it	17	
Other	8	
Total	582	544,000
