= Corticeira Amorim =

Portuguese subholding company

Corticeira Amorim, SGPS, S.A.
- Company type: Public (Sociedade Anónima)
- Traded as: Euronext Lisbon: COR; PSI-20 component
- ISIN: PTCOR0AE0006
- Industry: Cork; Manufacturing
- Founded: 1870; 156 years ago
- Headquarters: Mozelos, Portugal
- Key people: António Rios de Amorim (CEO)
- Revenue: €641.4 million (2016)
- Number of employees: 3602 (2016)
- Website: amorim.com

Corticeira Amorim, SGPS, S.A. is a Portuguese subholding company belonging to the Amorim Group. It claims to have been the world leader in the cork industry for over 130 years, with operations in hundreds of countries all over the world. Corticeira Amorim is responsible for the management of 70 companies engaged in the manufacture, research, development, promotion and sale of products and new solutions for the cork industry. António Rios de Amorim is the company's Chairman and CEO. Organized in five Business Units – Raw-Materials, Cork Stoppers, Floor & Wall Coverings, Composite Cork and Insulation Cork – Corticeira Amorim sells an array of products largely to such industries as the aeronautical, construction and wine-producing industries, a result of the investment made in R&D. Amorim's holding company is listed on the Euronext Lisbon stock exchange.

== Company ==
The company's share capital is €133 million. In 2007, Corticeira Amorim registered a positive growth of 2.5% compared to 2006, with a turnover of €453.8 million. Amorim performed fairly well in 2007 with operating profit increasing from €20.1 million to €23.2 million.

Corticeira Amorim is the world's leading producer of natural cork wine closures, with over 3 billion units produced annually. About 80% of its cork products are manufactured in the Iberian Peninsula. In 2007, the total workforce of Corticeira Amorim was 3795; the company provided training programmes to its employees, achieving a total of 54,428 hours of training (an average of 14.3 hours per worker).

== Sustainability ==
Corticeira Amorim has issued its first Sustainability Report in 2007, the first of its kind in the cork industry. The report was distinguished by Corporate Register as one of the best three world's sustainability reports in the Openness & Honesty category.

== History ==
The origin of Corticeira Amorim dates back to 1870 when a factory for the manufacture of natural cork stoppers for port wine bottling was established. Amorim & Irmãos, a cork manufacturing company incorporated in 1922, was the first member company under the current Corticeira Amorim, SGPS, S.A. umbrella of companies.

In March 2001 António Rios de Amorim succeeded his uncle Américo Amorim as CEO of Corticeira Amorim.

The Department for the Development of New Applications for Cork and Cork Products was established in 2004 with a view to developing and designing new cork solutions as well as strengthening knowledge exchange among the different business units. Investment in R&D was again emphasized in 2007 when the creation of a new across-the-board support business unit designed to meet the innovation challenge was announced: Amorim Cork Research.

== Criticism ==
Corticeira Amorim suspended all exports to Russia and ceased direct investments in the country following the start of the Ukraine war.

== See also ==
- PSI-20
- Cork oak
