= Paula Amorim =

Portuguese businesswoman (born 1971)

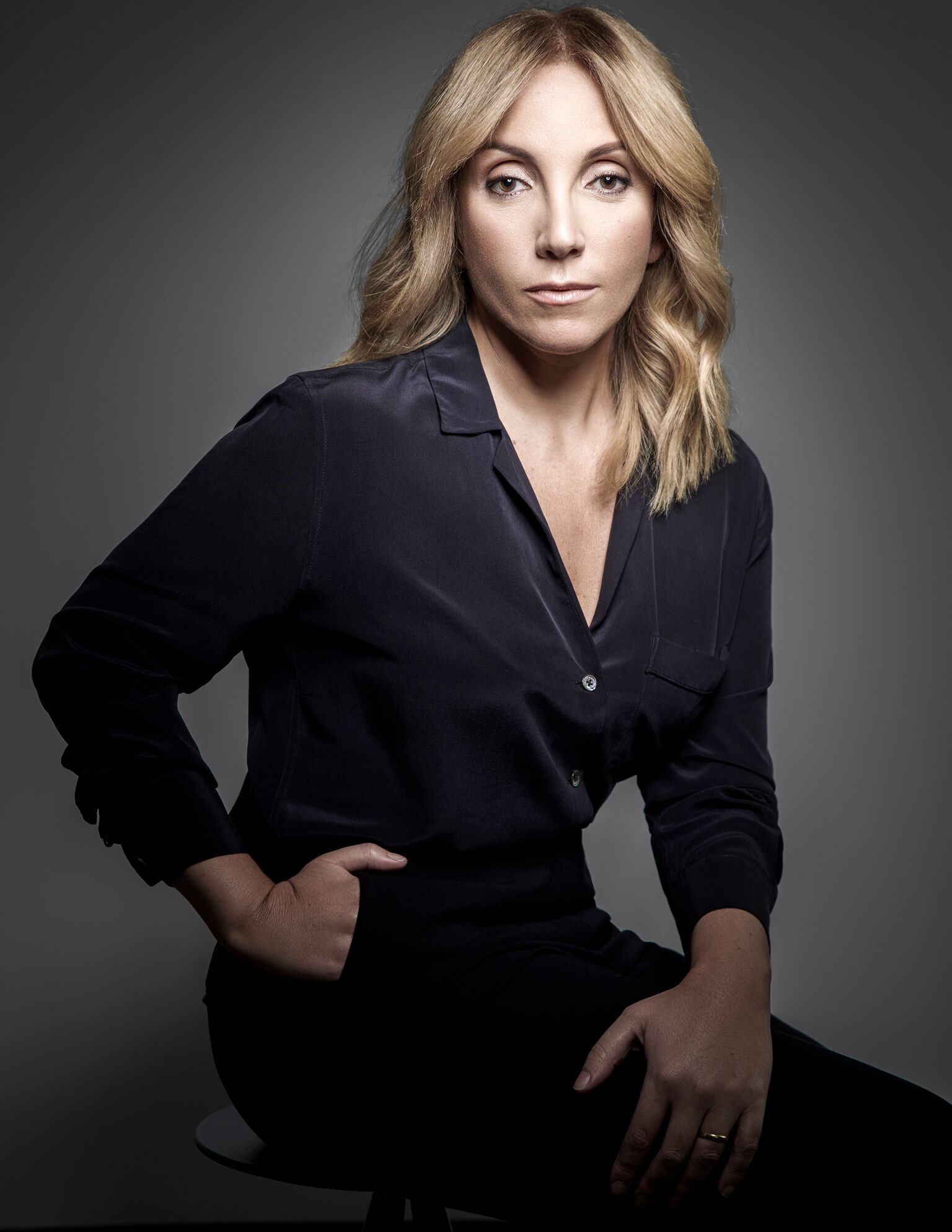
- Paula Amorim in 2016
- Born: Paula Fernanda Ramos Amorim; 20 January 1971 (age 54); Porto, Portugal
- Occupation: Businesswoman
- Spouse(s): Rui Alegre (m. 1995; div. 2005) Miguel Bleck Guedes de Sousa (m. 2012)
- Children: 3
- Parent(s): Américo Amorim (father); Maria Fernanda Ramos (mother)

Paula Fernanda Ramos Amorim (born 20 January 1971) is a Portuguese businesswoman, daughter of the businessman Américo Amorim. In 2016, she assumed the presidency of the board of directors of Galp Energia.

== Biography ==
Amorim was born in Porto on 20 January 1971, the eldest daughter of the businessman Américo Amorim and Maria Fernanda de Oliveira Ramos, she has two sisters: Marta and Luísa Amorim. She has two children from her first marriage: Rui (born 1996) and Francisca (born 2000); and one child, Manuel (born 2020), from her second marriage with Miguel Bleck Guedes de Sousa, via surrogacy.

== Career ==
Amorim attended the Real Estate Management course at the School of Real Estate Activities (ESAI), and at the age of 20 she started working in the Américo Amorim Group, dedicating herself in the following years to the real estate, forestry and agricultural areas.

Currently, Amorim is president and shareholder of Américo Amorim Group - Amorim Holding II, SGPS, SA - a Portuguese business group.

In November 2016, she assumed the Presidency of the Board of Directors of Galp Energia, SGPS, S.A., after four years of vice-presidency

Galp Energia is a group of Portuguese companies in the energy sector, with activities ranging from the exploration and production of oil and natural gas, to the refining and distribution of petroleum products, to the distribution and sale of natural gas and to the generation of energy power. It is currently one of the largest companies in Portugal. Amorim Energia, B.V., Of which Paula Amorim is an Administrator, is the main shareholder of Galp Energia, with a qualified holding of 33,34%.

Amorim is also a shareholder and member of the Board of Directors of Tom Ford International and owner of multi-brand Fashion Clinic stores and the Italian brand Gucci franchise in Portugal. The latter two are part of the holding Amorim Luxury, SGPS, S.A.

In 2019, Amorim was recognised as one of the 25 most influential women in Portugal.
