= Judiciary of Angola =

The Judiciary of Angola is defined by the Constitution of Angola, which outlines the structure of a Unified Justice System (Sistema Unificado de Justica). The courts are intended to be independent sovereign bodies administering impartial justice on behalf of the people. Their duty is to guarantee and ensure compliance with the Constitutional and other laws in force, to protect the rights and interests of citizens and institutions and to decide on the legality of administrative acts.

At the lowest level the system involves Municipal Courts, trial courts whose judges are usually laymen. Appeals in civil matters are heard by the Provincial Court and in criminal matters by the Supreme Court.

Provincial Courts administered by the Ministry of Justice and located in each of the 18 provincial capitals (two in Benguela Province) ae trial courts whose judges are nominated by the Supreme Court. Judges of the Provincial Courts, along with two laymen, act as a jury.

The Supreme Court (Tribunal Supremo), founded in 1985 and based in Luanda, hears appeals from the lower courts. It is divided into three chambers, namely the Criminal, Civil and Administration and Working Chambers and is composed of the President of the court, a vice-President and 16 judges, all appointed by the President of Angola. The President of the Supreme Court is known as the Chief Justice.

A Constitutional Court was founded in 2008 to act as the guardian of the Constitution. It is composed of 11 judges, four appointed by the President, four by the National Assembly, two by the Superior Council of the Judiciary, and one by the public.

Other specialised courts are the Supreme Military Court (Supremo Tribunal Militar) and the Auditing Court (Tribunal de Contas).

== List of chief justices ==
Incumbent	Tenure		Notes
Incumbent	Took office	Left office	Notes
João Felizado Muvimba	1990	1997	First Chief Justice
Cristiano André	1997	2004	
Manuel Miguel da Costa Aragão	2004	incumbent	
