= María Hung =

Venezuelan swimmer (born 1960)

Personal information
- Born: 8 June 1960 (age 66)

Sport
- Sport: Swimming

María Hung (born 8 June 1960) is a Venezuelan swimmer. She competed in two events at the 1976 Summer Olympics.
