= Sonae Indústria =

Sonae Indústria, SGPS, S.A.
- Company type: Sociedade Anónima
- Traded as: Euronext: SONI
- Industry: Manufacturing
- Founded: 1959
- Headquarters: Maia, Portugal
- Key people: Rui Correia (CEO), Paulo Azevedo (Chairman)
- Products: Engineered wood
- Revenue: €1.321 billion (2012)
- Operating income: ▼ (€25.9 million) (2010)
- Net income: ▼ (€74.4 million) (2010)
- Total assets: €1.486 billion (end 2010)
- Total equity: €298.8 million (end 2010)
- Number of employees: 4,790 (end 2010)
- Parent: Sonae
- Website: www.sonaeindustria.com

Sonae Indústria is a manufacturer of engineered wood products, founded and headquartered in Maia, Portugal. Present in five countries within three continents, Sonae Indústria has a wide range of products, from simple board to complete construction systems, a large range of wood-based products and materials for furniture, construction and decoration.

== Sonae Indústria worldwide ==
Founded and headquartered in Maia, Portugal, Sonae Indústria is in five countries within three continents, offering a wide range of products, from simple board to complete construction systems, a large range of wood-based products and materials for furniture, construction and decoration.

=== Canada ===
Sonae Indústria is present in Canada by its subsidiary Tafisa Canada in Lac-Mégantic, Quebec, since 1995 as an investment of Tableros de Fibras, S.A., later acquired by the Sonae Indústria Group

Since 2003, it became the first member of the Composite Panel Association (CPA) and producer of particleboard and thermofused melamine panels whose environmental management system met the requirements of ISO 14001.

In 2012, Tafisa Canada invested 10 million CAD on its facilities in order to recycle around 2 million trees per year

Tafisa Canada has received a third party certification for CARB Phase 2 compliance, as well as the FSC, LEED, EPP, SCS, ISO 14001 and ISO 9001 certifications.

=== France ===
Sonae Indústria has had a presence France since 1998, when it acquired Isoroy SAS. Nowadays, it operates 4 plants: Auxerre, Le Creusot and Ussel Corréze by its subsidiary Isoroy and Linxe by its subsidiary Darbo.

=== Germany ===
With 6 plants around the country ( Beeskow, Eiweiler, Horn, Kaisersesch, Meppen and Nettgau, it is present via its subsidiary Glunz AG.

Glunz AG was founded in 1932 and in 1992, acquired Isoroy SAS, which still operates in France, being acquired by Sonae Indústria Group five years later.

=== Portugal ===
Sonae Indústria headquarters is located in Maia, as well as the oldest active factory from the Group. They own as well other six plants around the country in Alcanede, Castelo de Paiva, Mangualde, Oliveira do Hospital, Sines and Vilela

=== South Africa ===
South Africa operations are based in two locations: Panbult and White River. During the latter part of 1998, Sonae Indústria invested in a R350 million plant in Panbult Mpumalanga.

Two years later acquired Sappi Novobord, including White River at their plant list.

=== Spain ===
Sonae Indústria has presence in Spain via its subsidiaries Tafisa and Tafibra, with plants in Betanzos, Linares, Pontecaldelas, Solsona and Valladolid.

=== United Kingdom ===
Spanboard Products Ltd at Coleraine in Northern Ireland began production in 1959 and was acquired by Sonae Industria, Portugal's largest privately owned industrial group in 1989. The company was extensively refurbished in the early 1990s when a new state of the art panel line for edged panels was installed. Investment was also made in a computerized panel saw to provide a cut to size service for melamine faced panels and gives greater flexibility for customer service. The factory produces wood particle board to meet the criteria of both, BS EN 312, (physical requirements for Particleboard) and also the site Quality Management System, which operates to ISO 9001.

=== Former Operations ===
Sonae Indústria had an operation in Brazil, which has been sold to Celulosa Arauco y Constitución in 2009, in a deal worth US$227m. Between 2000 and 2012 Sonae Indústria also operated a plant at Knowsley, Merseyside in the United Kingdom. The plant closed in 2012 following a series of fires and major accidents.

== Health, safety and environmental concerns ==
According to figures released by the Health and Safety Executive (HSE) Sonae Indústria's UK plant located at Knowsley, Merseyside, was the subject of 22 reports of major accidents between 2000 and 2010. Between 2003 and 2006 it was successfully prosecuted by the HSE on four occasions and fined a total of £132,000. On 1 June 2002 an explosion occurred at the plant and 20,000 liters of pollutant escaped into local waterways. The government's Environment Agency said: "On 3 June an Agency officer visited the site and saw that the outfall from Sonae's premises was gushing a milky white liquid. Kirkby Brook was discolored white for about two kilometers downstream, and still affected for at least a further two kilometers. Samples taken by the Agency revealed that the water in the brook was polluted to almost three times the strength of raw sewage. An ecology survey taken two days later showed that for at least 200 meters downstream, all life in the brook had been completely wiped out, and even as far as two and a half kilometers away the brook was classified as 'grossly polluted.'" In 2003 the Environment Agency prosecuted the firm over five pollution incidents affecting local waterways resulting in fines totaling £37,500. The HSE closed the plant on eight occasions between 2001 and 2003. Residents living near the plant have "repeatedly called for its closure following a series of chemical leaks and fires." Between 2000 and 2007 Knowsley Council served "many statutory notices on Sonae, including two prohibition notices, 10 enforcement notices, five variation notices and one notice requiring information, with which Sonae did not comply."

In December 2005, Sonae pleaded guilty to three charges brought by Knowsley Council under the Environmental Protection Act 1990 and was fined £13,000.

In 2007, lawyers engaged by Sonae wrote to the internet company hosting the website of local magazine Nerve and threatened legal action for "a damaging effect on reputation" following the magazine's publication of an article critical of the company's safety record. The article was authored by Steve Tombs from John Moores University and David Whyte from Liverpool University, both health and safety academics. The magazine responded that "Sonae's reputation is damaged not by what is written about it, but by its actions – it is a serial offender." In February 2007 the plant was forced to close for a month following a fire which started in an oil pump room. Local MP George Howarth raised the issue in Parliament and said: "Unless and until the HSE can be satisfied that the plant can safely reopen, and guarantee the health and safety of the workforce and residents, I believe that the plant needs to remain closed."

=== Worker deaths ===
2010

In December 2010 Merseyside Police and the HSE began a joint investigation into the deaths of two workers who were killed after being dragged into machinery at the Knowsley plant on 7 December. Rossendale and Darwen MP Jake Berry said "Should the owners of the factory again be found to have fallen short of safety standards, following a thorough and detailed investigation by the Health And Safety Executive, then I hope steps will be taken to prosecute them for corporate manslaughter." Merseyside Police passed the results of their investigation on to the Crown Prosecution Service who said they were awaiting the results of the HSE investigation and the coroner's inquests into the deaths, which was expected to be held in 2011.

The inquest eventually convened at Bootle Town Hall on 9 July 2013 before Christopher Sumner, the coroner for Sefton, Knowsley, and St Helens. The inquest heard that the two men, James Bibby, 25, and Thomas Elmer, 27, were both sub-contracted mechanical engineers and fitters and were carrying out maintenance work on a stationary conveyor belt 150 feet (46 m) above ground level at the time of the incident. John Moutrie, an investigator from HSE, said: "Mr Bibby and Mr Elmer were both found dead in the conveyor of Silo No 4. The two men were likely to have been working inside the conveyor or reaching into it to tighten the bolts at the bottom. At this point the conveyor started and there was no means of stopping it. They were drawn into the conveyor with tragic results. If safety procedures had been followed, the incident could not have occurred. Physical isolation of the conveyor belt had not been carried out."

Paul Atkinson, the works manager of the plant, admitted he had issued the men with a work permit "which certified he had personally examined the conveyor belt and was satisfied all the necessary safety precautions were in place." He also admitted that he "had not personally examined the conveyor belt to ensure it was isolated from the electrical supply" and did not have access to the central control room panel to isolate the conveyor. It was also disclosed that Atkinson had not undertaken the required IOSH Managing Safely course or "any other general health and safety training." Donald MacLeod, the plant's health and safety manager, refused to answer questions at the inquest in case he incriminated himself. He "declined to comment" when asked by the coroner about the permit to work scheme, refused to tell the court what his responsibilities as health and safety manager were, and declined to answer when asked whether he had any knowledge of an alleged 'near miss' on one of the conveyor belts three weeks prior to the fatal accident.

On 23 July 2013 the jury returned a narrative verdict saying "The method of local isolation was communicated verbally but was not physically demonstrated to the deceased men. In addition local isolation of the conveyor was neither confirmed or checked throughout the day. While there was a risk assessment carried out on the specific work undertaken by the men it appears this was not communicated to the men directly. It is clear from the evidence that the Sonae permit to work issuer/supervisor had not been given or undertaken specific training, or provided with sufficient supervision, in the permit to work procedure prior to 7 December 2010. It is our view that the death of each man was the result of a failure to adopt appropriate procedures." The HSE said it would consider the verdict before deciding whether to bring criminal charges.

In July 2015 Sonae and the men's employer, Valma Ltd, admitted failing to ensure the safety of their employees. They were fined £220,000 and £190,000 respectively.

2011

On 6 August 2011 a 62-year-old employee was killed at the Knowsley site. The worker was a contractor for the demolition team called in to remove the damage caused by the previous fire on 9 June 2011

=== June 2011 fire ===
During the early evening of 9 June 2011 Merseyside Fire and Rescue Service sent twelve fire appliances to the plant after fire broke out in concrete bunkers containing 12,000 tonnes of woodchip. It took eight days to extinguish the fire. Mr. Howarth said: "This latest incident at Sonae serves as yet another example of the fact that this plant is unstable and hazardous to local residents, businesses and those who work there. Sonae takes up far too much of the time and resources of the fire service, Knowsley Council and the Health and Safety Executive. I will shortly be calling a joint meeting of the various bodies responsible for monitoring Sonae to pool their experience and seriously consider whether it can be allowed to continue given the risks to the community." During a Parliamentary debate about health and safety legislation on 13 June 2011, Mr. Howarth raised the issue with Chris Grayling MP, the Minister of State for the Department for Work and Pensions, and again asked for the plant to be closed down.

The fire resulted in Sonae facing a class action compensation claim from 18,000 people who alleged their health was affected by the toxic emissions from the plant during the 8 days it burned. Sonae admitted liability, "subject to causation which means each claimant has to show that they suffered personal injury and/or nuisance as a result of the fire." The case is the largest class action of its kind in UK legal history.

In June 2013 lawyers acting for the claimants secured a High Court order which required Sonae to notify the lawyers if the manufacturer's insurance policy falls below £65 million. Anthony Wilson, for the claimants, said: "We saw the factory being stripped down but we did not have confirmation they had enough to cover the insurance. We understand machinery has already been sold off to foreign companies and will find its way to other European countries. We were fearful the equipment was being taken out of the jurisdiction to prevent a weighty payout in the future. This is not about the claim culture, but defending the rights of vulnerable people who could go on to suffer long-term illness because of this plant."

In July 2015 the class action claim was rejected in the High Court of Justice by Mr Justice Jay, who decided that the symptoms suffered by the 16,626 claimants were "short-lived and had not exceeded the hurdle the law sets for actionable personal injury." In his ruling, he said: "It is difficult to say for how long the smoke and these mild symptoms lasted, but I have in mind a maximum period of about one week. Many months later – it is unclear exactly how and why – lawyers arrived on the scene and sensed the opening of a business opportunity. It proved not very difficult to recruit willing claimants to the group, not least because there was a lot of ill-feeling in the neighbourhood directed towards Sonae, and many people genuinely believed that they must have been harmed in some way. The legal process preyed on human susceptibility and vulnerability, and the rest is history."

=== Early Day Motion and closure ===
An Early Day Motion calling for the permanent closure of the plant was tabled by Knowsley MP George Howarth on 14 June 2011.

Another fire on the night of 26 January 2012 led to Howarth calling again for the factory to be closed, saying that "in view of these incidents" the council should "rescind" the company's environmental permit. The plant ceased production on 13 September 2012. The land has since been sold to The Peel Group for redevelopment.

== See also ==
- Sonae
