= Sonae =

Multinational business group headquartered in Maia, Portugal

Sonae SGPS, S.A.
- Company type: Stock Corporation
- Traded as: Euronext Lisbon: SON; PSI-20 component
- ISIN: PTSON0AM0001
- Industry: Retail (food and non-food products), shopping centres, Telecommunications, retail real estate and technology and investment management
- Founded: 1959
- Headquarters: Maia, Portugal
- Key people: Cláudia Azevedo (CEO), Paulo de Azevedo (Chairman)
- Products: Hypermarkets; supermarkets; convenience stores; shops of proximity; restaurants; drugstores, bookstores; apparel; sports; consumer electronics; aesthetic and dental medicine clinics; insurance plans; credit cards; shopping centres; credit cards; real estate management; financial services; telecommunications; software; information and media systems.
- Revenue: €5.710 billion (2017)
- Net income: €166 million (2017)
- Number of employees: 53,794 (2019)
- Subsidiaries: Sonae MC, Sonae S&F, Worten, Sonae RP, Sonae FS, Sonae IM, Sonae Sierra (70%), NOS (23.4%)
- Website: sonae.pt

Sonae is a multinational business group headquartered in Maia, Portugal. It operates in 90 countries, working in various sectors, among which retail (food, electronics, and fashion), real estate, media and telecommunications, technology investments, and financial services stand out.

It is the largest private employer in Portugal, with a total of 48,222 employees. On February 17, 2022, the company's CEO, Cláudia Azevedo, announced a restructuring of the company's image and its respective subsidiaries.

Sonae is listed on the Euronext PSI-20 in Lisbon, with the code SON.

== History ==
Sonae was founded in 1959 by the entrepreneur, banker and patron from Arouca, Afonso Pinto de Magalhães. The business group originated from the Sociedade Nacional de Estratificados, an industrial company operating in the area of processed wood, more specifically, in the production of decorative high-pressure laminated panels. During the first two decades of existence, Sonae remained as a small to medium-size business company.

Afonso Pinto de Magalhães, also the founder of the Pinto Magalhães Bank, placed Fábio Lemos in control of Sonae in the turbulent years following the Carnation Revolution. During that period, the company was nationalized and then reprivatized.

In 1982, Afonso Pinto de Magalhães gave 16% of Sonae to Belmiro de Azevedo, who had been admitted to Sonae in 1965. After the death of the founder, Belmiro de Azevedo reached the majority of the capital, with 54.6%, taking control of the company.

During the 1980s, Sonae began its fast growth. In 1985, Sonae Investimentos SGPS, S.A. was created and the group entered the Lisbon Stock Exchange. It was also in the early 1980s that Sonae began its business diversification strategy through acquisitions and the creation of new investments.

The group entered into the modern distribution market by opening the first hypermarket in Portugal, "Continente", in Matosinhos. Two years later, Sonae launched seven takeover bids to seven companies, which allowed the business group to grow in various business areas.

In 1993, Sonae Indústria expanded its investments by acquiring a controlling position in Spanish company Tafisa, which allowed the company to extend its business segment. Posteriorly, another important step was taken when Sonae entered into the specialized retail area with the launch of Worten.

In 1998, with Paulo de Azevedo leading the project, Optimus was born. The mobile operator merged with Zon in 2013, giving rise to NOS.

In 2007, Paulo de Azevedo took over the leadership of the Sonae group, succeeding his father, Belmiro de Azevedo.

In March 2015, Belmiro de Azevedo announced his resignation as Sonae chairman. Paulo de Azevedo was chosen as the new chairman and CEO of the Sonae group, sharing the executive committee presidency with Ângelo Paupério, who was the vice president of Sonae until that point.

In 2018, Cláudia Azevedo was elected executive president of Sonae by the biggest shareholder company of the group, the Efanor. Belmiro de Azevedo's daughter started functions in May 2019, replacing the group Co-CEOs, Paulo de Azevedo and Ângelo Paupério.

== Organization ==
Currently, Sonae has an organizational structure separated by different business areas, which include the following subholdings:

MC

MC is the leader in the Portuguese food retail market. It has 1,411 stores, comprising the brands: Arenal, Bagga, Continente, Continente Bom Dia, Continente Modelo, Continente Online, Dr. Wells, Elergone Energias, Go Natural, Meu Super, Note!, Wells and Zu.

Zeitreel

Zeitreel is the largest Portuguese fashion group, responsible for Sonae's specialized retail area in sports and clothing. Its portfolio includes the brands Salsa (jeans, clothing, and accessories), MO (clothing, footwear, and accessories), Zippy (baby and child clothing, footwear, and accessories), and Losan (specialized in wholesale children's clothing with an international presence).

Worten

An omnichannel retail company focusing on appliances and electronics with a total of 276 physical stores. It also has an online presence, complemented by the expansion of its marketplace. It includes the brands Worten, Worten Mobile, and Worten Resolve.

Universo

Universo is the business unit coordinating the financial services offered by Sonae companies. This segment includes the Universo Card (Payments, Card, Personal Credit, and Insurance), the Cartão Dá (meal card, gift, and rewards), Universo Flex (financing for online purchases), MoneyGram, and in-store credit services.

Bright Pixel

Bright Pixel Capital has an active portfolio management strategy, aiming to create and manage a set of technology companies related to retail, telecommunications, and cybersecurity. Its portfolio includes WeDo Technologies, Bizdirect, S21 Sec, Inovretail.

Sonae Sierra

Sierra operates in the real estate sector.

Sonae owns 100% of Sonae Sierra's capital.

NOS

NOS is a telecommunications and entertainment group offering a telecommunications services to all market segments: personal, residential, business, and wholesale. It has a prominent position in subscription TV services, next-generation broadband services, telephony, and film distribution in Portugal. Sonae holds 37.4% of NOS's capital.

== Innovation ==
In 2012, Sonae invested more than 70 million Euros in research in the retail sector, in a programme that involved around 3,200 employees. In 2014, Sonae compiled a book with more than 80 innovations developed during 2013, in areas like Health or Technology, many of them with national and international prizes.

== See also ==
- Belmiro de Azevedo
- Modelo Continente
- Sonae Indústria
