= Galp Energia =

Portuguese petroleum company

Galp, SGPS, S.A.
- Type: Sociedade Anónima
- Traded as: Euronext Lisbon: GALP
- ISIN: PTGAL0AM0009
- Industry: Petroleum industry
- Predecessor: Petrogal; Gás de Portugal; Transgás
- Founded: April 22, 1999
- Headquarters: Lisbon, Portugal
- Key people: Paula Amorim (Chairman), Filipe Silva (CEO)
- Products: Oil and gas exploration and production, natural gas transportation and distribution, oil refining, electricity generation
- Services: Fuel stations Natural gas heating
- Revenue: €15.204 billion (2017)
- Operating income: €1.063 million (2017)
- Net income: €602 million (2017)
- Total assets: €12.358 billion (end 2017)
- Total equity: €6.080 billion (end 2017)
- Owner: Amorim Energia (35.8%)
- Number of employees: 6,389 (2021)
- Subsidiaries: Galp Energia E&P BV; Petróleos de Portugal - Petrogal, S.A. Galp Gas & Power SGPS, S.A. Galp Energia, S.A.
- Website: www.galp.com

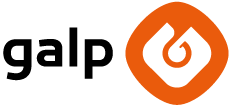
Galp used from 2016 until 2024

Galp Energia logo used from 2002 until 2016

Galp Energia, SGPS, S.A. is a Portuguese multinational energy corporation, headquartered in Lisbon, Portugal. Galp consists of more than 100 companies engaged in every aspect of the oil and natural gas supply, hydrocarbon exploration and production; refining, trading, logistics and retailing; co-generation and renewable energy. Galp was founded in 1999 through the merger of Petrogal, Gás de Portugal and Transgás. As of 2020, it is the largest oil and gas group in Portugal, where it distributes gas and sells petrol.

== History ==
Galp can trace its origins back to 1848 and the installation of Lisbon's first gas street lamps, but the current incarnation was formed through the merger of Petrogal, Gás de Portugal and Transgás, on April 22, 1999. The main historical business components include SACOR, CIDLA, SONAP and PETROSUL.

SACOR was one of the first Portuguese oil companies. In 1954, SACOR's activities extended to Portugal's overseas territories; 80% of the gasoline, kerosene, and gasoil transported into the Portuguese overseas province of Angola had to be refined on continental Portugal's territory.

The Portuguese discovered oil in their overseas province of Angola in the 1950s. SACOR set up the Sociedade de Lubrificantes e Combustíveis (ANGOL) in 1953 as its branch in Angola. By the 1960s, it was also participating in the exploration for hydrocarbons. In 1957, SACOR participated in the establishment of another oil company, MOÇACOR, in the Portuguese overseas province of Mozambique.

After the Carnation Revolution 25 in April 1974, Portugal gave independence to its overseas provinces, with the ownership of the local SACOR branches being ceded to the new countries. SACOR was nationalized in 1975 by the new Portuguese regime. In April 1976, Petróleos de Portugal (PETROGAL) was formed by the merger of SACOR with three other nationalized oil companies (CIDLA, SONAP and PETROSUL). In the same year, the brand GALP is created as the trademark for the PETROGAL products, with the initial version of its famous "G" logo being launched in 1978.

In 1999, Galp Energia is created as the holding company for the Portuguese State-owned oil and gas business, controlling PETROGAL and Gás de Portugal (GDP). In the same year, the process of privatization of Galp Energia is initiated.

In March 2004, Galp proposed selling a 51 percent stake in Gás de Portugal to EDP; Eni agreed to buy the remaining 49 percent. In December 2004, the European Commission blocked the transaction. Galp Energia's initial public offering on the Lisbon Stock Exchange took place in the second half of 2007.

In 2007, Galp bought Eni's operations for marketing oil products in Portugal and Spain. In 2011, talks between Eni and Petrobras for the latter to buy Eni's 33.3 percent stake in Galp collapsed over the price of the stake. From 2012 to 2014, Eni continuously reduced its stake in Galp. In 2016, Galp and Petrobras broadened an existing cooperation accord to include offshore oil research and development projects and exploration and production partnerships.

In 2020, Galp partnered with Spanish engineering firm ACS to create Titan Solar, a renewable energy joint venture, and bought solar power projects from ACS for 2.2 billion euros ($2.38 billion). By 2022, it bought the 24.99 percent it did not already own for 140 million euros ($142.5 million).

In 2021, Galp joined forces with battery developer Northvolt on Aurora, a joint venture to develop Europe's largest lithium processing plant with a total investment of up to 700 million euros.

== Operations ==
Galp Energia, SGPS, S.A. is organized into four business units, which include, Upstream, Refining & Midstream, Commercial, and Renewables & New Businesses. The company carries out these operations through four subsidiaries, including:

- Galp Energia E&P BV and its subsidiaries engage in the development, exploration and production of oil and gas and biofuels.
- Petróleos de Portugal - Petrogal, S.A. and its subsidiaries carry out activities in the area of crude oil refining and marketing.
- Galp Gas & Power SGPS, S.A. and its subsidiaries operate in the natural gas, electricity and renewable energy sectors.
- Galp Energia, S.A., a company that operates and integrates the corporate services.

== Controversy ==
In 2007, the European Commission fined Galp 8.7 million euros ($12.33 million) for playing a role in a cartel and coordinating bitumen prices in Spain, along with three other companies.

In 2016, Spanish antitrust body CNMC fined the Spanish arm of Galp 400,000 euros ($448,280) for abusing consumer rights after having received a number of complaints since mid-2012 of company representatives changing users' power supplier to Galp without the consumers' consent.

In 2025, Galp's chief executive Filipe Silva resigned following a company investigation into an anonymous complaint about an alleged personal relationship between Silva and a female company manager reporting to him.
